= 2026 BAL qualification =

Qualifying games for the 2026 BAL season

- Association: FIBA Africa
- League: Road to BAL
- Sport: Basketball
- Duration: 17 October – 22 November 2025
- Teams: 25

West Division
- Division champions: (Libya) Al Ahly Ly (1st division title)
- Top scorer: James Amotoe (Spintex Knights)

East Division
- Division champions: (Kenya) Nairobi City Thunder (2nd division title)
- Top scorer: Raphiael Putney; Dar City

Seasons
- ← 2025 2027 →

The qualification for the 2026 BAL season, also known as Road to BAL 2026, were the qualifying tournaments for the sixth season of the Basketball Africa League (BAL). The tournaments were organised by FIBA Africa.

The competition began on 17 October and ended in 22 November 2025.

== Teams ==
The official list of teams were announced by FIBA on 3 October 2025.

Dynamo was supposed to represent Burundi as national champions, however, it was not able to meet the deadlines, including the pending suspension after their withdrawal from the 2024 BAL season, which occurred after the Burundian government disallowed the team to wear the Rwandan sponsor, following political tensions between the two nations.

=== West Division ===
Association	Team	Qualification method	Ref.
Entered in Elite 16
Cape Verde	Kriol Star		
Entered in first round
Benin	Elan Coton	2025 Benin Basketball Super League champions	
Burkina Faso	AS Douanes	2025 Burkinabé Men's Basketball Championship champions	
Central African Republic	New Tech Bantou		
(Democratic Republic of the Congo) DR Congo	New Generation		
Ivory Coast	JCA	2025 Ligue d'Or champions	
Gabon	Moanda	2025 Gabonese Basketball Cup champions	
Ghana	Spintex Knights	2025 Accra Basketball League champions	
Guinea	Centre Fédéral de Guinée		
Mali	CRB Tombouctou	2025 Ligue 1 champions	
Liberia	LPRC Oilers	2024–25 LFA First Division	
Libya	Al Ahly Ly	2024–25 Libyan Division I Basketball League	

=== East Division ===
Association	Team	Qualification method	Ref.
Entered in Elite 16
Kenya	Nairobi City Thunder	2024–25 KBF Premier League champions	
Cameroon	BEAC	2024–25 Elite Messieurs champions	
Entered in first round
Uganda	Namuwongo Blazers	1st ranked team in 2025 NBL Uganda (Note: The FUBA initially nominated 2024 NBL champions City Oilers as representative, however, Nam Blazers successfully protested the decision, and was given the spot based on its first place in the regular season of the 2025 season.)	
Botswana	Dolphins	2025 Botswana Basketball League champions	
Burundi	~~Dynamo~~	2025 Burundian Basketball Championship	
Comoros	Djabal		
Mozambique	Ferroviário da Beira	2024 Liga Moçambicana de Basquetebol champions	
Madagascar	~~COSPN~~	2025 N1A champions	
Malawi	Bravehearts	2025 BASMAL National Championship champions	
South Africa	Johannesburg Giants	2025 South African National Basketball Championship champions	
Tanzania	Dar City	2024 National Basketball League champions	
Zambia	Matero Magic	2024–25 Zambia Basketball League champions	
Zimbabwe	Basket Hounds	2025 BUZ National Championship champions	

== First round ==
The group stage began on 17 October and ended on 29 October. The venues for each group were announced on 15 October 2025.

=== West Division ===
==== Group A ====
Venue: Bamako, Mali

Pos	Team	Pld	W	L	PF	PA	PD	Pts	Qualification
1	(Libya) Al Ahly Ly	3	3	0	251	197	+54	6	Advance to Elite 16
2	(Mali) CRB Tombouctou (H)	3	2	1	203	182	+21	5	Advance to Elite 16
3	(Guinea) Centre Fédéral de Guinée	3	1	2	177	223	−46	4	
4	(Burkina Faso) AS Douanes Ouagadougou	3	0	3	186	215	−29	3	

Source: FIBA
(H) Hosts

==== Group B ====
Venue: Abidjan, Ivory Coast

Pos	Team	Pld	W	L	PF	PA	PD	Pts	Qualification
1	(Ivory Coast) Jeunesse Club d'Abidjan (H)	3	3	0	218	152	+66	6	Advance to Elite 16
2	(Ghana) Spintex Knights	3	2	1	197	184	+13	5	Advance to Elite 16
3	(Benin) Elan Coton	3	1	2	167	201	−34	4	Advance to Elite 16
4	(Liberia) LPRC Oilers	3	0	3	174	219	−45	3	

Source: FIBA
(H) Hosts

==== Group C ====
Venue: Kinshasa, Democratic Republic of the Congo

Pos	Team	Pld	W	L	PF	PA	PD	Pts	Qualification
1	(Gabon) Moanda	2	2	0	158	143	+15	4	Advance to Elite 16
2	(Democratic Republic of the Congo) New Generation (H)	2	1	1	146	143	+3	3	Advance to Elite 16
3	(Central African Republic) New Tech Bantou	2	0	2	146	164	−18	2	Advance to Elite 16

Source: FIBA
(H) Hosts

==== Ranking of third-placed teams ====
Pos	Team	Pld	W	L	PF	PA	PD	Pts	Qualification
1	(Central African Republic) New Tech Bantou	2	0	2	146	164	−18	2	Advance to Elite 16
2	(Benin) Elan Coton	2	0	2	92	132	−40	2	Advance to Elite 16
3	(Guinea) Centre Fédéral de Guinée	2	0	2	111	162	−51	2	Eliminated

Updated to match(es) played on unknown. Source: FIBA

=== East Division ===
==== Group D ====
Venue: Dar es Salaam, Tanzania

Pos	Team	Pld	W	L	PF	PA	PD	Pts	Qualification
1	(Tanzania) Dar City (H)	2	2	0	185	120	+65	4	Advance to Elite 16
2	(Uganda) Namuwongo Blazers	2	1	1	202	141	+61	3	Advance to Elite 16
3	(Comoros) Djabal	2	0	2	108	234	−126	2	

Source: FIBA
(H) Hosts

==== Group E ====
Venue: Lusaka, Zambia

Pos	Team	Pld	W	L	PF	PA	PD	Pts	Qualification
1	(South Africa) Johannesburg Giants	5	5	0	362	280	+82	10	Advance to Elite 16
2	(Mozambique) Ferroviário da Beira	5	4	1	432	378	+54	9	Advance to Elite 16
3	(Zambia) Matero Magic (H)	5	3	2	383	280	+103	8	Advance to Elite 16
4	(Malawi) Bravehearts	5	2	3	346	354	−8	7	
5	(Botswana) Dolphins	5	1	4	309	333	−24	6	
6	(Zimbabwe) Basket Hounds	5	0	5	342	442	−100	5	

Source: FIBA, FIBA Report
(H) Hosts

== Elite 16 ==
On 31 October 2025, Nairobi, Kenya and Praia, Cape Verde were announced as host venues.

=== West Division ===
New Tech Bantou was forced to withdraw after it was unable to travel to Praia.

==== Group A ====
Pos	Team	Pld	W	L	PF	PA	PD	Pts	Qualification
1	(Ivory Coast) Jeunesse Club d'Abidjan	3	3	0	239	203	+36	6	Advance to final round
2	(Mali) CRB Tombouctou	3	2	1	239	240	−1	5	Advance to final round
3	(Democratic Republic of the Congo) New Generation	3	1	2	198	225	−27	4	
4	(Cape Verde) Kriol Star (H)	3	0	3	255	263	−8	3	

Source: FIBA
(H) Hosts

==== Group B ====
Pos	Team	Pld	W	L	PF	PA	PD	Pts	Qualification
1	(Libya) Al Ahly Ly	2	2	0	177	131	+46	4	Advance to final round
2	(Ghana) Spintex Knights	2	1	1	134	157	−23	3	Advance to final round
3	(Gabon) Moanda	2	0	2	137	160	−23	2	
4	(Central African Republic) New Tech Bantou	0	0	0	0	0	0	0	Withdrew

Source: FIBA

==== Final round ====
Semi-finals
(Ivory Coast) JCA Abidjan	93
(Ghana) Spintex Knights	82
(Libya) Al Ahly Ly	103
(Mali) CRB Tombouctou	76

Final
(Ivory Coast) JCA Abidjan	92
(Libya) Al Ahly Ly	105
Third place game
(Ghana) Spintex Knights	64
(Mali) CRB Tombouctou	90

===== Semi-finals =====
15 Nov 2025	JCA Abidjan (Ivory Coast)	93–82	(Ghana) Spintex Knights	Praia, Cape Verde
20:30 (GMT-1)	Scoring by quarter: 19–20, 22–17, 22–18, 30–27
	Pts: Nuga 27; Rebs: Yayo 8 Asts: Cisse 3	Boxscore	Pts: Amotoe 24; Rebs: Bassey, Oumar, Yakubu 7 Asts: Opoku-Tham 2	Arena: Pavilhão Desportivo Vavá Duarte; Attendance: 231

15 Nov 2025	Al Ahly Ly (Libya)	103–76	(Mali) CRB Tombouctou	Praia, Cape Verde
18:00 (GMT-1)	Scoring by quarter: 27–10, 25–24, 34–14, 17–28
	Pts: Jordan 20; Rebs: Zubčić, Sadi 10; Asts: Bile, Sadi, Jordan 3	Boxscore	Pts: B. Diallo 17; Rebs: Dó, Fall 7 Asts: Kaba, Toure, Fall 3	Arena: Pavilhão Desportivo Vavá Duarte; Attendance: 430

===== Third place game =====
16 Nov 2025	Spintex Knights (Ghana)	64–90	(Mali) CRB Tombouctou	Praia, Cape Verde
18:00 (GMT-1)	Scoring by quarter: 21–15, 15–26, 19–24, 9–25
	Pts: Amotoe 19; Rebs: Oumar 11; Asts: Amotoe 4	Boxscore	Pts: Coulibaly 19; Rebs: Coulibaly 14; Asts: Fofana 6	Arena: Pavilhão Desportivo Vavá Duarte; Attendance: 250

===== Final =====
16 Nov 2025	JCA Abidjan (Ivory Coast)	92–105	(Libya) Al Ahly Ly	Praia, Cape Verde
20:30 (GMT-1)	Scoring by quarter: 22–34, 24–26, 23–28, 23–17
	Pts: Cisse 27; Rebs: Yayo 10; Asts: Cisse 5	Boxscore	Pts: Zubčić 24; Rebs: Hamad 7 Asts: Jordan 5	Arena: Pavilhão Desportivo Vavá Duarte; Attendance: 254

=== East Division ===
==== Group A ====
Pos	Team	Pld	W	L	PF	PA	PD	Pts	Qualification
1	(Kenya) Nairobi City Thunder (H)	2	2	0	175	145	+30	4	Advance to final round
2	(South Africa) Johannesburg Giants	2	1	1	175	157	+18	3	Advance to final round
3	(Uganda) Namuwongo Blazers	2	0	2	133	181	−48	2	

Source: FIBA
(H) Hosts

==== Group B ====
Pos	Team	Pld	W	L	PF	PA	PD	Pts	Qualification
1	(Tanzania) Dar City	3	3	0	265	231	+34	6	Advance to final round
2	(Mozambique) Ferroviário da Beira	3	2	1	245	240	+5	5	Advance to final round
3	(Zambia) Matero Magic	3	1	2	243	245	−2	4	
4	(Malawi) Bravehearts	3	0	3	212	249	−37	3	

Source: FIBA

==== Final round ====
Semi-finals
(Kenya) Nairobi City Thunder	109
(Mozambique) Ferroviário da Beira	70
(Tanzania) Dar City	69
(South Africa) Johannesburg Giants	71

Final
(Kenya) Nairobi City Thunder	94
(South Africa) Johannesburg Giants	84
Third place game
(Mozambique) Ferroviário da Beira	77
(Tanzania) Dar City	92

===== Semifinals =====
22 Nov 2025	Nairobi City Thunder (Kenya)	109–70	(Mozambique) Ferroviário da Beira	Nairobi, Kenya
19:00 (GMT+3)	Scoring by quarter: 22–12, 30–20, 31–16, 26–22
	Pts: A. Adera 32; Rebs: Majok 9 Asts: E. Adera 10	Boxscore	Pts: Nurmamade, Drame 13; Rebs: Drame 7 Asts: Munguambe 4	Arena: Kasarani Indoor Arena; Attendance: 5,129

22 Nov 2025	Dar City (Tanzania)	69–71	(South Africa) Johannesburg Giants	Nairobi, Kenya
16:30 (GMT+3)	Scoring by quarter: 21–13, 18–21, 14–20, 16–17
	Pts: Zouzoua 25; Rebs: Deng 13; Asts: Diabate 8	Boxscore	Pts: Dim 21; Rebs: Prinsloo 14; Asts: Dim 4	Arena: Kasarani Indoor Arena; Attendance: 1,500

===== Third place game =====
23 Nov 2025	Ferroviário da Beira (Mozambique)	77–92	(Tanzania) Dar City	Nairobi, Kenya
15:30 (GMT+3)	Scoring by quarter: 12–27, 19–23, 25–19, 21–23
	Pts: Thomas, Ubisse 16; Rebs: Munguambe 7 Asts: Nurmamade, Bouchum, Munguambe 3	Boxscore	Pts: Putney 28; Rebs: Putney, Thabeet 8 Asts: Diabate 14	Arena: Kasarani Indoor Arena

===== Final =====
22 Nov 2025	Nairobi City Thunder (Kenya)	94–84	(South Africa) Johannesburg Giants	Nairobi, Kenya
18:00 (GMT+3)	Scoring by quarter: 28–17, 22–21, 33–23, 11–23
	Pts: Majok, Ongwae 17; Rebs: E. Adera 12; Asts: E. Adera 8	Boxscore	Pts: Deing 21; Rebs: Sibanyoni 11; Asts: 5 tied 2	Arena: Kasarani Indoor Arena; Attendance: 5,423
