= 2026 BAL season =

6th season of the Basketball Africa League

- League: Basketball Africa League
- Sport: Basketball
- Duration: 27 March – 31 May 2026
- Games: 42
- Teams: 12
- Season champions: (Rwanda) RSSB Tigers (1st title)
- Third place: (Libya) Al Ahly Ly
- Fourth place: (Egypt) Al Ahly
- Season MVP: Craig Randall
- Runners-up: (Angola) Petro de Luanda

Seasons
- ← 2025 (Season 5) 2027 →

The 2026 BAL season, also known as BAL Season 6, was the 6th season of the Basketball Africa League (BAL). The playoffs and finals were held in BK Arena in Kigali, Rwanda, for a fifth time, as a result of a long-term agreement with the country. The season began on 27 March and finished on 31 May 2026 with the final. The RSSB Tigers from Rwanda won their first title, after beating Petro de Luanda in the final.

As winners, RSSB Tigers earned the right to play in the 2026 FIBA Intercontinental Cup. Al Ahli Tripoli were the previous champions, but did not qualify for the competition, as they lost in the finals of the Libyan Division I.

== Venues ==
Under a long-term agreement between the Rwanda Development Board and the BAL, the playoffs and finals will be held in the BK Arena in Kigali, Rwanda, for a record fifth time.

== Qualification ==
=== Elite 16 ===
==== West Division ====
| Association | Team | Qualification method |
|---|---|---|
| Cape Verde | Kriol Star | Direct qualification |
| Libya | Al Ahly Ly | First round West Division Group A winner |
| Mali | CRB Tombouctou | First round West Division Group A runners-up |
| Ivory Coast | JCA Kings | First round West Division Group B winner |
| Ghana | Spintex Knights | First round West Division Group B runners-up |
| Gabon | Moanda | First round West Division Group C winner |
| (Democratic Republic of the Congo) DR Congo | New Generation | First round West Division Group C runners-up |
| Central African Republic | New Tech Bantou | First round West Division best third place |

==== East Division ====
| Association | Team | Qualification method |
|---|---|---|
| Cameroon | BEAC | Direct qualification |
| Kenya | Nairobi City Thunder | Direct qualification |
| Tanzania | Dar City | First round East Division Group D winner |
| Uganda | Namuwongo Blazers | First round East Division Group D runners-up |
| South Africa | Johannesburg Giants | First round East Division Group E winner |
| Mozambique | Ferroviário da Beira | First round East Division Group E runners-up |
| Zambia | Matero Magic | First round East Division Group E third place |
| Benin | Elan Coton | First round West Division second best third place |

== Teams ==
Location of teams of the 2026 BAL season .

Petro de Luanda qualified for its sixth BAL season, a record for most appearances by any club. For the first time in league history, US Monastir did not represent Tunisia, as they lost to Club Africain in the Championnat Pro A finals.

For this season, eight teams qualified directly to the main stage, including the champions of Morocco and South Africa. Dar City from Tanzania was given a wild card after finishing third in the East Division of the Road to BAL.

On March 12, 2026, APR withdrew from the season, despite having earlier qualified as Rwandan national champions. The team is owned by the Rwandan Defence Force, which had been under American sanctions due to allegations of supporting armed groups in the DR Congo. As such, the team was not able to participate in the competition, as NBA Africa is an American entity. On Mar 20, FERWABA announced that the RSSB Tigers would replace APR.

=== Method of qualification and statistics ===
| Team | Method of qualification | Date of qualification | App. | Previous year | Cons. | Best performance | Ref. |
|---|---|---|---|---|---|---|---|
| (Tunisia) Club Africain | 2024–25 Championnat Pro A | 24 May 2025 | 1st | – | 1 | Debut | |
| (Angola) Petro de Luanda | 2024–25 Angolan Basketball League | 30 May 2025 | 6th | 2025 | 6 | Champions (2024) | |
| (Egypt) Al Ahly | 2024–25 Egyptian Basketball Premier League | 1 June 2025 | 3rd | 2024 | 1 | Champions (2023) | |
| (Senegal) ASC Ville de Dakar | 2025 Nationale 1 Masculin | 30 June 2025 | 2nd | 2025 | 2 | Group phase (2025) | |
| (Rwanda) RSSB Tigers | FERWABA-assigned replacement | 20 March 2026 | 1st | – | 1 | Debut | |
| (Morocco) FUS Rabat | 2024–25 Division Excellence | | 3rd | 2025 | 3 | Quarterfinalist (2024, 2025) | |
| (Nigeria) Maktown Flyers (Note: The Maktown Flyers qualified while being known as the Lagos Legends, but changed their name before the start of the 2026 BAL season.) | 2025 NBBF Premier League | 23 November 2025 | 1st | – | 1 | Debut | |
| (Libya) Al Ahly Ly | Elite 16 West Division finalist | 15 November 2025 | 2nd | 2024 | 1 | Runners-up (2024) | |
| (Ivory Coast) Jeunesse Club d'Abidjan | Elite 16 West Division finalist | 15 November 2025 | 1st | – | 1 | Debut | |
| (South Africa) Johannesburg Giants | Elite 16 East Division finalist | 22 November 2025 | 1st | – | 1 | Debut | |
| (Kenya) Nairobi City Thunder | Elite 16 East Division finalist | 22 November 2025 | 2nd | 2025 | 1 | Group phase (2025) | |
| (Tanzania) Dar City | Wild card | 24 November 2025 | 1st | – | 1 | Debut | |

== Group phase ==
The official schedule was announced on 30 January 2026.

The team allocation and schedule for the group phase were announced on 26 February 2026.

=== Kalahari Conference ===
The Kalahari Conference took place from 27 March to 5 April 2026 in the SunBet Arena in Pretoria, South Africa.

| Pos | Team | Pld | W | L | PF | PA | PD | PCT | Qualification | APR | PDL | AAL | DAR | NCT | JHG |
|---|---|---|---|---|---|---|---|---|---|---|---|---|---|---|---|
| 1 | (Rwanda) RSSB Tigers | 5 | 4 | 1 | 483 | 455 | +28 | .800 | Advance to playoffs | — | 82–78 | 103–95 | 104–92 | 92–101 | 102–89 |
| 2 | (Angola) Petro de Luanda | 5 | 4 | 1 | 484 | 378 | +106 | .800 | Advance to playoffs | 78–82 | — | 104–90 | 100–75 | 97–70 | 105–61 |
| 3 | (Libya) Al Ahly Ly | 5 | 3 | 2 | 520 | 456 | +64 | .600 | Advance to playoffs | 95–103 | 90–104 | — | 118–97 | 107–80 | 110–72 |
| 4 | (Tanzania) Dar City | 5 | 2 | 3 | 454 | 477 | −23 | .400 | Advance to playoffs | 92–104 | 75–100 | 97–118 | — | 90–85 | 100–70 |
| 5 | (Kenya) Nairobi City Thunder | 5 | 2 | 3 | 407 | 451 | −44 | .400 | | 101–92 | 70–97 | 80–107 | 85–90 | — | 71–65 |
| 6 | (South Africa) Johannesburg Giants (H) | 5 | 0 | 5 | 357 | 488 | −131 | .000 | | 89–102 | 61–105 | 72–110 | 70–100 | 65–71 | — |

Source: Basketball Africa League
Legend: Blue = home team win; Red = away team win.
(H) Hosts

=== Sahara Conference ===
The Sahara Conference took place from 24 April to 3 May 2026 in the Prince Moulay Abdellah Indoor Stadium in Rabat, Morocco.

| Pos | Team | Pld | W | L | PF | PA | PD | PCT | Qualification | CAF | AAH | ASC | FUS | MAK | JCA |
|---|---|---|---|---|---|---|---|---|---|---|---|---|---|---|---|
| 1 | (Tunisia) Club Africain | 5 | 4 | 1 | 387 | 369 | +18 | .800 | Advance to playoffs | — | 69–68 | 85–79 | 68–71 | 86–77 | 79–74 |
| 2 | (Egypt) Al Ahly | 5 | 4 | 1 | 395 | 357 | +38 | .800 | Advance to playoffs | 68–69 | — | 76–72 | 77–71 | 89–80 | 85–65 |
| 3 | (Senegal) ASC Ville de Dakar | 5 | 3 | 2 | 380 | 364 | +16 | .600 | Advance to playoffs | 79–85 | 72–76 | — | 67–66 | 79–62 | 83–75 |
| 4 | (Morocco) FUS Rabat (H) | 5 | 3 | 2 | 390 | 339 | +51 | .600 | Advance to playoffs | 71–68 | 71–77 | 66–67 | — | 97–72 | 85–55 |
| 5 | (Nigeria) Maktown Flyers | 5 | 1 | 4 | 367 | 419 | −52 | .200 | | 77–86 | 80–89 | 62–79 | 72–97 | — | 76–68 |
| 6 | (Ivory Coast) JCA Kings | 5 | 0 | 5 | 337 | 408 | −71 | .000 | | 74–79 | 65–85 | 75–83 | 55–85 | 68–76 | — |

Source: Basketball Africa League
Legend: Blue = home team win; Red = away team win.
(H) Hosts

== Playoffs ==
The playoffs were played at the BK Arena in Kigali, Rwanda.

=== Bracket ===
Quarterfinals
1 | (Angola) Petro de Luanda | 82 | 83 | 165
8 | (Tanzania) Dar City | 88 | 69 | 157
4 | (Tunisia) Club Africain | 87 | 80 | 167
5 | (Libya) Al Ahly Ly | 88 | 98 | 186
2 | (Egypt) Al Ahly | 90 | 87 | 177
7 | (Senegal) ASC Ville de Dakar | 93 | 76 | 169
3 | (Rwanda) RSSB Tigers | 95 | 98 | 193
6 | (Morocco) FUS Rabat | 72 | 99 | 171

Semifinals
1 | (Angola) Petro de Luanda | 94
5 | (Libya) Al Ahly Ly | 88
2 | (Egypt) Al Ahly | 97
3 | (Rwanda) RSSB Tigers | 106

Final
1 | (Angola) Petro de Luanda | 88
3 | (Rwanda) RSSB Tigers | 90
Third place game
5 | (Libya) Al Ahly Ly | 106
2 | (Egypt) Al Ahly | 98

== Individual awards ==
The awards was announced on 31 May 2026, before or after the final.

- MVP: Craig Randall II, RSSB Tigers
- Defensive Player of the Year: Mangok Mathiang, RSSB Tigers
- Coach of the Year: Henry Mwinuka, RSSB Tigers
- Sportsmanship Award: Mohamed Sadi, Al Ahly Ly

- All-BAL First Team
  - G Childe Dundao , Petro de Luanda
  - G Craig Randall II, RSSB Tigers
  - F Donovan Williams, Al Ahly Ly
  - F Majok Deng, Al Ahly Ly
  - C Mangok Mathiang, RSSB Tigers
- All-BAL Second Team
  - Omar Abada, Club Africain
  - Zach Lofton, Al Ahly
  - Kevin Murphy, Al Ahly
  - Aboubakar Gakou, Petro de Luanda
  - Jo Lual-Acuil, Al Ahly Ly

- BAL All-Defensive First Team
  - G Childe Dundão, Petro de Luanda
  - G Mohamed Sadi, Al Ahly Ly
  - F Aminu Mohammed, Club Africain
  - F Mouhamadou Diagne, FUS Rabat
  - C Mangok Mathiang, RSSB Tigers
- BAL All-Defensive Second Team
  - G David Michineau, Dar City
  - G Axel Toupane, ASC Ville de Dakar
  - F Majok Deng, Al Ahly Ly
  - F Osayi Osifo, Al Ahly
  - C Jo Lual-Acuil, Al Ahly Ly

== Statistics ==
=== Individual statistic leaders ===
| Category | Player | Team(s) | Statistic |
|---|---|---|---|
| Points per game | Craig Randall II | RSSB Tigers | 36.1 |
| Rebounds per game | Mangok Mathiang | RSSB Tigers | 13.5 |
| Assists per game | Damion Baugh | Al Ahly Ly | 10.0 |
| Steals per game | Aminu Mohammed | Club Africain | 2.4 |
| Steals per game | David Michineau | Dar City | 2.4 |
| Blocks per game | Lance Thomas | Nairobi City Thunder | 2.8 |
| Minutes per game | Craig Randall II | RSSB Tigers | 38.0 |
| Minutes per game | Nisre Zouzoua | Dar City | 38.0 |
| Minutes per game | Daniel Utomi | Dar City | 38.0 |
| FG% | Jo Lual-Acuil | Al Ahly Ly | 58.9% |
| 3P% | Majok Deng | Al Ahly Ly | 51.1% |
| FT% | Childe Dundão | Petro de Luanda | 86.5% |

=== Individual game highs ===
| Category | Player | Team | Statistic |
|---|---|---|---|
| Points | Craig Randall II | RSSB Tigers | 54 (record) |
| Rebounds | Sisco George Ngaiza | Dar City | 24 |
| Assists | Damion Baugh | Al Ahly Ly | 18 (record) |
| Steals | Ehab Amin | Al Ahly | 7 |
| Blocks | Mouhamadou Diagne | FUS Rabat | 6 |
| Three pointers | Craig Randall II | RSSB Tigers | 11 (record) |

=== Team statistic leaders ===
| Category | Team | Statistic |
|---|---|---|
| Points per game | Al Ahly Ly | 100.0 |
| Rebounds per game | JCA Kings | 49.6 |
| Assists per game | Al Ahly Ly | 22.9 |
| Steals per game | Petro de Luanda | 12.3 |
| Blocks per game | FUS Rabat | 4.7 |
| Turnovers per game | Maktown Flyers | 19.6 |
| Fouls per game | Nairobi City Thunder | 20.8 |
| FG% | Al Ahly Ly | 49.3% |
| FT% | Nairobi City Thunder | 82.1% |
| 3P% | Al Ahly Ly | 37.0% |
| 3P% | Nairobi City Thunder | 37.0% |

== See also ==
- 2026 Women's Basketball League Africa
