= 2025 BAL qualification =

Sport season

2025 BAL qualification (Road to BAL 2025)
- Association: FIBA Africa
- League: Road to BAL
- Sport: Basketball
- Duration: 8 October – 4 December 2024
- Teams: 26

West Division
- Division champions: (Libya) Al Ahli Tripoli (1st division title)
- Top scorer: Elly Randriamampionona (GNBC)

East Division
- Division champions: (Kenya) Nairobi City Thunder (1st division title)
- Top scorer: Jean Jacques Boissy (Urunani)

Seasons
- ← 2024 2026 →

The qualification for the 2025 BAL season, also known as "Road to BAL 2025", were the qualifying tournaments for the 5th season of the Basketball Africa League (BAL). The tournaments were organised by FIBA Africa and began on 8 October and finished on 4 December 2024.

A total of 26 teams played in this season's qualifying system, The format was slightly altered, as this season only five teams qualified from the qualifying system, opposed to four in all previous years.

== Format changes ==
The format was changed from the previous four tournaments, as this season only four teams qualified through the Road to BAL, a decrease from the six teams in previous years. The national champions from Morocco and South Africa received direct qualification. In the first round, five groups in two divisions were played, with the top teams advancing to the elite 16. In the Elite 16 phase, the teams will be placed in two groups of eight teams each. After a round-robin tournament, the top two teams in each group will advance to the 2025 BAL season.

== Teams ==
The first list of teams was announced by FIBA on 9 October 2024.

† denotes that a team withdrew.

=== West Division (Sahara Conference) ===
Association	Team	Date of qualification	Qualification method	Participation	Ref.
Entered in first round
Benin	Elan Coton	27 April 2024	2023–24 Benin Basketball Super League champions	3rd	
Burkina Faso	USFA †	23 September 2024	2024 Burkinabé Men's Basketball Championship champions	1st	
Cameroon	KSA	22 May 2024	2023–24 Elite Messieurs champions	1st	
Cape Verde	Kriol Star	–	Representative of the FCBB	1st	
Central African Republic	Abeilles	29 September 2024	2024 Bangui Basketball League champions	1st	
(Democratic Republic of the Congo) DR Congo	Chaux Sport	7 September 2024	2024 Coupe du Congo winners	1st	
Ivory Coast	ABC Fighters	24 June 2024	2024 Ligue d'Or season champions	4th	
Gabon	Moanda	3 April 2024	2024 Gabonese Basketball Cupchampions	1st	
Ghana	Spintex Knights	14 December 2023	2023 Accra Basketball League champions	1st	
Mali	Stade Malien		2024 Ligue 1 champions	2nd	
Liberia	Mighty Barrolle	24 September 2024	2024 Liberia Basketball Association Division 1 champions	1st	
Libya	Al Ahli Tripoli	14 July 2024	2023–24 Libyan Division I Basketball League champions	1st	

=== East Division (Nile Conference) ===
Association	Team	Date of qualification	Qualification method	Participation	Ref.
Entered in Elite 16
Uganda	City Oilers	4 September 2024	2024 NBL Uganda season champions	4th	
South Africa	MBB	–	2024 South African National Basketball Championship winners	1st	
Entered in first round
Botswana	BDF V	[data missing]		1st	
Burundi	Urunani	29 September 2024	2024 Viva Basketball League champions	2nd	
Comoros	Ushindzi	15 September 2023	2023 Comoros Basketball Championship winners	2nd	
Ethiopia	Hawassa City †	[data missing]		2nd	
Kenya	Nairobi City Thunder	20 July 2024	2023–24 KBF Premier League champions	1st	
Mozambique	Costa do Sol	20 December 2023	2023 LMB season champions	1st	
Madagascar	GNBC	30 October 2023	2024 N1A champions	2nd	
Malawi	Bravehearts	[data missing]	2023–24 BASMAL National Championship winners	2nd	[data missing]
South Sudan	Fox	20 October 2024	SSBF BAL qualifying tournament winners	1st	
Seychelles	Beau Vallon Heat	[data missing]		3rd	
Tanzania	JKT Stars	[data missing]	2023 National Basketball Leaguechampions	2nd	
Zambia	Matero Magic	6 January 2024	2023–24 Zambia Basketball Leaguechampions	3rd	
Zimbabwe	Basket Hounds	9 June 2024	2024 BUZ National Championshipwinners	1st	

== First round ==
=== West Division ===
The West Division will begin with a group in Tripoli, Libya, from 8 to 13 October 2024.

==== Group A ====
Pos	Team	Pld	W	L	PF	PA	PD	Pts	Qualification
1	(Libya) Al Ahli Tripoli (H)	2	2	0	185	143	+42	4	Advance to Elite 16
2	(Mali) Stade Malien	2	1	1	147	161	−14	3	Advance to Elite 16
3	(Cape Verde) Kriol Star (W)	2	0	2	153	181	−28	2	Advance to Elite 16

Source: FIBA
(H) Hosts; (W) Wild card

10 October 2024	Al Ahli Tripoli (Libya)	85–66	(Mali) Stade Malien	Tripoli
19:30 (GMT+2)	Scoring by quarter: 32–11, 14–21, 15–20, 24–14
	Pts: Eric 23; Rebs: Almeida 13; Asts: Almeida, Hodge 7	Boxscore	Pts: Coulibaly 20; Rebs: Pare 8 Asts: Keïta 8	Arena: Great Hall; Referees: BANZA KALUME, Tonton (COD), GAGA, Didier (RWA),LAROUCI, Adlen (ALG)

11 October 2024	Stade Malien (Mali)	81–76	(Cape Verde) Kriol Star	Tripoli
19:30 (GMT+2)	Scoring by quarter: 20–20, 16–21, 24–17, 21–16
	Pts: Coulibaly, Kanoute 16; Rebs: Pare 11; Asts: Kante 5	Boxscore	Pts: Lahrichi, Ndizeye 14; Rebs: Brown 12; Asts: Lahrichi 7	Arena: Great Hall; Referees: KAMATE, Hassane (CIV), BANZA KALUME, Tonton (COD), TABOUBI, Amir (TUN)

12 October 2024	Kriol Star (Cape Verde)	77–100	(Libya) Al Ahli Tripoli	Tripoli
19:30 (GMT+2)	Scoring by quarter: 19–23, 19–33, 18–20, 21–24
	Pts: Stewart 16; Rebs: Ndizeye 7 Asts: Lahrichi 14	Boxscore	Pts: Sadi 21; Rebs: Abdoallah 10; Asts: Badrush 10	Arena: Great Hall; Referees: BANZA KALUME, Tonton (COD) KAMATE, Hassane (CIV) GEBETO, Walelign Fikadu (ETH)

==== Group B ====
Pos	Team	Pld	W	L	PF	PA	PD	Pts	Qualification
1	(Ivory Coast) ABC Fighters	3	3	0	281	216	+65	6	Advance to Elite 16
2	(Ghana) Spintex Knights	3	1	2	232	241	−9	4 (Note: Head-to-head point differential: 1) Spintex Knights, 1–1 (+9); 2) Mighty Barrolle, 1–1 (–1); 3) Elan Coton, 1–1 (–8).)	Advance to Elite 16
3	(Liberia) Mighty Barrolle (W)	3	1	2	211	231	−20	4	Advance to Elite 16
4	(Benin) Elan Coton	3	1	2	209	245	−36	4	

Source: FIBA
(W) Wild card
Notes:

10 October 2024	ABC Fighters (Ivory Coast)	88–69	(Liberia) Mighty Barrolle	Tripoli, Libya
17:00 (GMT+2)
		Boxscore		Arena: Great Hall

10 October 2024	Spintex Knights (Ghana)	82–69	(Benin) Elan Coton	Tripoli, Libya
17:00 (GMT+2)
		Boxscore		Arena: Great Hall

11 October 2024	Spintex Knights (Ghana)	81–99	(Ivory Coast) ABC Fighters	Tripoli, Libya
17:00 (GMT+2)
		Boxscore		Arena: Great Hall

11 October 2024	Elan Coton (Benin)	74–69	(Liberia) Mighty Barrolle	Tripoli, Libya
17:00 (GMT+2)
		Boxscore		Arena: Great Hall

12 October 2024	ABC Fighters (Ivory Coast)	94–66	(Benin) Elan Coton	Tripoli, Libya
17:00 (GMT+2)
		Boxscore		Arena: Great Hall

12 October 2024	Mighty Barrolle (Liberia)	73–69	(Ghana) Spintex Knights	Tripoli, Libya
17:00 (GMT+2)
		Boxscore		Arena: Great Hall

==== Group C ====
The Group C games were played in Douala, Cameroon, from 27 October to 1 November 2024.

Pos	Team	Pld	W	L	PF	PA	PD	Pts	Qualification
1	(Democratic Republic of the Congo) Chaux Sport	4	4	0	331	279	+52	8	Advance to Elite 16
2	(Cameroon) KSA (H)	4	3	1	302	236	+66	7	Advance to Elite 16
3	(Gabon) Moanda (W)	4	1	3	279	289	−10	5 (Note: Head-to-head record tie-breaker: 1) Moanda, 1–1 (+8); 2) Abeilles, 1–1 (0); 3) King Africa, 1–1 (–8).)	Advance to Elite 16
4	(Central African Republic) Abeilles	4	1	3	257	296	−39	5	
5	(Equatorial Guinea) King Africa	4	1	3	230	299	−69	5	

Source: FIBA
(H) Hosts; (W) Wild card
Notes:

27 October 2024	KSA (Cameroon)	69–54	(Gabon) MDA	Douala, Cameroon
17:00 (GMT+1)	Scoring by quarter: 17–9, 15–15, 17–16, 20–14
	Pts: Bileg 12; Rebs: Bileg 9 Asts: Three players 4	Boxscore	Pts: Boukosso Igouwe 22; Rebs: Siby 14; Asts: Obiang Akam 3	Arena: Complexe multisports de Japoma; Attendance: 200

27 October 2024	Abeilles (Central African Republic)	61–79	(Democratic Republic of the Congo) Chaux Sport	Douala, Cameroon
19:30 (GMT+1)	Scoring by quarter: 24–21, 6–23, 15–17, 15–17
	Pts: Kamayengue 16; Rebs: Kamayengue 7 Asts: Kokonendji 5	Boxscore	Pts: Nyembo 13; Rebs: Kambuy Manga 13; Asts: Rotardier 4	Arena: Complexe multisports de Japoma; Attendance: 800

28 October 2024	King Africa (Equatorial Guinea)	37–72	(Cameroon) KSA	Douala, Cameroon
17:00 (GMT+1)	Scoring by quarter: 23–11, 5–23, 3–14, 6–24
		Boxscore		Attendance: 450

28 October 2024	Moanda (Gabon)	71–75	(Central African Republic) Abeilles	Douala, Cameroon
19:30 (GMT+1)	Scoring by quarter: 15–10, 22–17, 15–20, 19–28
		Boxscore

29 October 2024	Chaux Sport (Democratic Republic of the Congo)	79–76	(Gabon) Moanda	Douala, Cameroon
17:00 (GMT+1)	Scoring by quarter: 11–19, 17–22, 28–23, 23–12
		Boxscore		Attendance: 200

30 October 2024	King Africa (Equatorial Guinea)	63–59	(Central African Republic) Abeilles	Douala, Cameroon
19:30 (GMT+1)	Scoring by quarter: 18–18, 14–10, 16–13, 15–18
		Boxscore		Attendance: 200

31 October 2024	KSA (Cameroon)	78–83	(Democratic Republic of the Congo) Chaux Sport	Douala, Cameroon
17:00 (GMT+1)
		Boxscore		Attendance: 800

31 October 2024	Moanda (Gabon)	78–66	(Equatorial Guinea) King Africa	Douala, Cameroon
19:30 (GMT+1)	Scoring by quarter: 18–19, 23–21, 19–13, 18–13
		Boxscore

1 November 2024	Abeilles (Central African Republic)	62–83	(Cameroon) KSA	Douala, Cameroon
17:00 (GMT+1)	Scoring by quarter: 9–22, 18–16, 25–21, 10–24
		Boxscore		Attendance: 200

1 November 2024	Chaux Sport (Democratic Republic of the Congo)	90–64	(Equatorial Guinea) King Africa	Douala, Cameroon
19:30 (GMT+1)	Scoring by quarter: 19–23, 21–14, 16–15, 34–12
		Boxscore		Attendance: 200

=== East Division ===
The East Division will be hosted in Kibaha, Tanzania from 15 to 20 October 2024. The other group will be held in Harare, Zimbabwe, from 22 to 27 October 2024.

==== Group A ====
Venue: City Sports Center, Harare, Zimbabwe

Pos	Team	Pld	W	L	PF	PA	PD	Pts	Qualification
1	(Zambia) Matero Magic	5	5	0	408	238	+170	10	Advance to Elite 16
2	(Malawi) Bravehearts	5	3	2	339	349	−10	8 (Note: Head-to-head record: 1) Bravehearts, 2–0; 2) Fox, 1–1; 3) Costa do Sol, 0–2.)	Advance to Elite 16
3	(South Sudan) Fox (W)	5	3	2	368	316	+52	8	Advance to Elite 16
4	(Mozambique) Costa do Sol	5	3	2	352	321	+31	8	
5	(Zimbabwe) Basket Hounds (H)	5	2	3	333	355	−22	7	
6	(Botswana) BDF V	5	0	5	302	477	−175	5	

Source: FIBA
(H) Hosts; (W) Wild card
Notes:

22 October 2024	Fox (South Sudan)	76–67	(Botswana) BDF V	Harare, Zimbabwe
14:00
		Boxscore		Arena: City Sports Center

22 October 2024	Costa do Sol (Mozambique)	71–78	(Zambia) Matero Magic	Harare, Zimbabwe
16:30
		Boxscore		Arena: City Sports Center

22 October 2024	Basket Hounds (Zimbabwe)	72–62	(Malawi) Bravehearts	Harare, Zimbabwe
18:00
		Boxscore		Arena: City Sports Center

23 October 2024	Fox (South Sudan)	71–66	(Mozambique) Costa do Sol	Harare, Zimbabwe
14:00
				Arena: City Sports Center

23 October 2024	Bravehearts (Malawi)	67–82	(Zambia) Matero Magic	Harare, Zimbabwe
16:30
				Arena: City Sports Center

23 October 2024	BDF V (Botswana)	69–71	(Zimbabwe) Basket Hounds	Harare, Zimbabwe
18:00
				Arena: City Sports Center

24 October 2024	BDF V (Botswana)	70–72	(Malawi) Bravehearts	Harare, Zimbabwe
14:00
				Arena: City Sports Center

24 October 2024	Matero Magic (Zambia)	67–63	(South Sudan) Fox	Harare, Zimbabwe
16:30
				Arena: City Sports Center

24 October 2024	Costa do Sol (Mozambique)	86–62	(Zimbabwe) Basket Hounds	Harare, Zimbabwe
18:00
				Arena: City Sports Center

25 October 2024	Bravehearts (Malawi)	65–60	(South Sudan) Fox	Harare, Zimbabwe
14:00
				Arena: City Sports Center

25 October 2024	BDF V (Botswana)	54–64	(Mozambique) Costa do Sol	Harare, Zimbabwe
16:30
				Arena: City Sports Center

25 October 2024	Matero Magic (Zambia)	82–68	(Zimbabwe) Basket Hounds	Harare, Zimbabwe
18:00
				Arena: City Sports Center

26 October 2024	Costa do Sol (Mozambique)	71–73	(Malawi) Bravehearts	Harare, Zimbabwe
14:00
				Arena: City Sports Center

26 October 2024	Matero Magic (Zambia)	114–42	(Botswana) BDF V	Harare, Zimbabwe
16:30
				Arena: City Sports Center

26 October 2024	Fox (South Sudan)	89–60	(Zimbabwe) Basket Hounds	Harare, Zimbabwe
21:00
				Arena: City Sports Center

==== Group B ====
Times are in GMT+3.

Venue: The Filbert Bayi Olympafrica Centre, Kibaha, Tanzania

Hawassa City from Ethiopia and Ushindzi Club from the Comoros were also initially announced to be in the group, before they withdrew.

Pos	Team	Pld	W	L	PF	PA	PD	Pts	Qualification
1	(Burundi) Urunani	4	4	0	247	149	+98	8	Advance to Elite 16
2	(Kenya) Nairobi City Thunder	4	3	1	359	270	+89	7	Advance to Elite 16
3	(Madagascar) GNBC	4	2	2	303	352	−49	6	
4	(Tanzania) JKT (H)	4	1	3	260	317	−57	5	
5	(Seychelles) Beau Vallon Heat	4	0	4	232	364	−132	4	

Source: FIBA
(H) Hosts

16 October 2024	Beau Vallon Heat (Seychelles)	53–89	(Kenya) Nairobi City Thunder	Kibaha, Tanzania
16:00	Scoring by quarter: Not reported
	Pts: Bouchereau 19; Rebs: Mutyambizi 6 Asts: Mutyambizi 8	Boxscore	Pts: Davis 28; Rebs: Davis, Okoth 11; Asts: Iroegbu 7	Arena: The Filbert Bayi Olympafrica Centre; Attendance: 200; Referees: Guy Sani (CMR), Silver Jacques Houngbedji (BEN), Didier Shema Nshuti (RWA)

16 October 2024	Urunani (Burundi)	83–60	(Tanzania) JKT	Kibaha, Tanzania
19:00	Scoring by quarter: 9–25, 15–18, 14–26, 22–14
	Pts: Boissy 37; Rebs: Olisemeka 13; Asts: Boissy 6	Boxscore	Pts: Ndula 20; Rebs: Manyonyi 7 Asts: Ndula 3	Arena: The Filbert Bayi Olympafrica Centre

17 October 2024	Beau Vallon Heat (Seychelles)	43–112	(Burundi) Urunani	Kibaha, Tanzania
16:00	Scoring by quarter: 26–12, 34–11, 23–8, 29–12
	Pts: Alao 8 Rebs: Oliseh 10; Asts: Chang-Time 3	Boxscore	Pts: Doumbya 25; Rebs: Sibanyoni 11; Asts: Boissy 12	Arena: The Filbert Bayi Olympafrica Centre; Attendance: 151; Referees: Mahamadou Diallo (MLI), Mohamed Shabani (TAN), Yao Kizungu (COD)

17 October 2024	GNBC (Madagascar)	89–72	(Tanzania) JKT	Kibaha, Tanzania
19:00	Scoring by quarter: 20–15, 18–25, 23–26, 11–23
	Pts: Ramorasata, Mory 25; Rebs: Mory 7 Asts: Mory 6	Boxscore	Pts: Mushi 20; Rebs: Felesian 11; Asts: Mkosa 4	Arena: The Filbert Bayi Olympafrica Centre; Attendance: 165; Referees: Guy Sani (CMR), Khaled Ahmed (EGY), Antonio Sitoe (MOZ)

18 October 2024	Nairobi City Thunder (Kenya)	88–89	(Burundi) Urunani	Kibaha, Tanzania
	Pts: T. Ongwae 23; Rebs: G. Diing 10; Asts: U. Iroegbu 7		Pts: J. Boissy 28; Rebs: P. Olisemeka 11; Asts: J. Boissy 9	Arena: The Filbert Bayi Olympafrica Centre

18 October 2024	GNBC (Madagascar)	98–72	(Seychelles) Beau Vallon Heat	Kibaha, Tanzania
	Pts: E. Randriamampionona 33; Rebs: C. Rasolofonirina 5 Asts: S. Ramorasata 7		Pts: D. Chang 20; Rebs: D. Chang 9 Asts: D. Mutyambizi 4	Arena: The Filbert Bayi Olympafrica Centre

19 October 2024	Beau Vallon Heat (Seychelles)	59–65	(Tanzania) JKT	Kibaha, Tanzania
				Arena: The Filbert Bayi Olympafrica Centre

19 October 2024	GNBC (Madagascar)	56–112	(Burundi) Urunani	Kibaha, Tanzania
16:00	Scoring by quarter: 14–29, 12–31, 10–30, 20–22
	Pts: Mory 18; Rebs: Mory 5 Asts: Mory 7	Boxscore	Pts: Boissy, Doumbya 25; Rebs: Sibanyoni 9 Asts: Boissy, Crawford 7	Arena: The Filbert Bayi Olympafrica Centre; Attendance: 160

20 October 2024	Nairobi City Thunder (Kenya)	86–63	(Tanzania) JKT	Kibaha, Tanzania
19:00	Scoring by quarter: 18–20, 23–9, 20–23, 25–11
	Pts: Ogechi 23; Rebs: Diing 9 Asts: Ongwae 8	Boxscore	Pts: Mushi 18; Rebs: Felesian 10; Asts: Ndula 10	Arena: The Filbert Bayi Olympafrica Centre; Attendance: 160; Referees: SANI, Guy (CMR) HOUNGBEDJI, Silver Jacques (BEN) MOCKEY, Gnoambilé Guillaume (CIV)

== Elite 16 ==
The top eight teams from each division qualify for the Elite 16, in which teams in each division are split up in two groups. Here, they are joined by teams that already played in the 2024 BAL season and were national champions, as well as by the NBA Academy Africa.

=== West Division ===
The West Division will be played from 5 to 10 November 2024 in Abidjan, Ivory Coast. Moanda and Mighty Barrolle were given wild cards.

==== Draw ====
The draw was held on 3 November 2024 at the FIBA Africa headquarters in Abidjan.

==== Group A ====
Pos	Team	Pld	W	L	PF	PA	PD	Pts	Qualification	SMAL	ABC	CHS	MDA
1	(Mali) Stade Malien	3	3	0	241	198	+43	6	Advance to final round	—	90–80	72–65	79–53
2	(Ivory Coast) ABC Fighters	3	1	2	255	229	+26	4	Advance to final round	80–90	—	85–88	90–51
3	(Democratic Republic of the Congo) Chaux Sport	3	1	2	218	229	−11	4		65–72	88–85	—	65–72
4	(Gabon) Moanda	3	1	2	176	234	−58	4		53–79	51–90	72–65	—

Source: FIBA
Legend: Blue = home team win; Red = away team win.

==== Group B ====
Pos	Team	Pld	W	L	PF	PA	PD	Pts	Qualification	AHT	KSA	MIG	SPI
1	(Libya) Al Ahli Tripoli	3	3	0	296	235	+61	6	Advance to final round	—	96–91	99–75	101–69
2	(Cameroon) KSA	3	2	1	256	242	+14	5	Advance to final round	91–96	—	81–75	84–71
3	(Liberia) Mighty Barrolle	3	1	2	229	248	−19	4		75–99	75–81	—	79–68
4	(Ghana) Spintex Knights	3	0	3	208	264	−56	3		69–101	71–84	68–79	—

Source: FIBA
Legend: Blue = home team win; Red = away team win.

==== Final round ====
===== Semi-finals =====
9 November 2024	Stade Malien (Mali)	80–59	(Cameroon) KSA	Abidjan, Ivory Coast
16:30	Scoring by quarter: 17–14, 28–14, 18–15, 17–16
	Pts: Coulibaly 19; Rebs: Djambo 11; Asts: Keïta 7	Boxscore	Pts: Kadji 12; Rebs: Bileg 10; Asts: Nzeulie 3	Arena: Palais des Sports de Treichville; Attendance: 110

9 November 2024	Al Ahli Tripoli (Libya)	80–76	(Ivory Coast) ABC Fighters	Abidjan, Ivory Coast
16:30	Scoring by quarter: 23–19, 20–24, 20–22, 17–11
	Pts: Murphy 34; Rebs: Sadi 9 Asts: Four players 3	Boxscore	Pts: Bland 18; Rebs: Badji 10; Asts: Camara 4	Arena: Palais des Sports de Treichville; Attendance: 1,156

===== Third place game =====
9 November 2024	KSA (Cameroon)	53–92	(Ivory Coast) ABC Fighters	Abidjan, Ivory Coast
16:30	Scoring by quarter: 17–24, 6–19, 18–25, 12–24
	Pts: Gueye 17; Rebs: Gueye 11; Asts: Pitard, Nzeulie 2	Boxscore	Pts: Zouzoua 19; Rebs: Narcis 10; Asts: Bland 5	Arena: Palais des Sports de Treichville; Attendance: 150; Referees: Sofiane Si Youcef (ALG), Amir Taboubi (TUN), Oumar Sy (MTN)

===== Final =====
10 November 2024	Stade Malien (Mali)	68–71	(Libya) Al Ahli Tripoli	Abidjan, Ivory Coast
19:30	Scoring by quarter: 16–30, 22–24, 16–11, 14–6
	Pts: Kanoute 19; Rebs: Dade Haman, Kanoute 7 Asts: Kante 7	Boxscore	Pts: Badrush 26; Rebs: Deng 15; Asts: Sadi 5	Arena: Palais des Sports de Treichville; Attendance: 1,050; Referees: Tonton Banza Kalume (COD), Walelign Fikadu Gebeto (ETH), Hassane Kamate (CIV)

=== East Division ===
The East Division will be held in the Kasarani Indoor Arena in Nairobi, Kenya, from 28 November to 3 December 2025. Kriol Star from Cape Verde and Fox from South Sudan received wild cards.

==== Draw ====
The draw was held on 24 November 2024 in Abidjan.

==== Group A ====
Pos	Team	Pld	W	L	PF	PA	PD	Pts	Qualification
1	(Kenya) Nairobi City Thunder (H)	3	3	0	297	198	+99	6	Advance to final round
2	(Cape Verde) Kriol Star	3	2	1	223	220	+3	5	Advance to final round
3	(South Africa) MBB	3	1	2	207	226	−19	4	
4	(Malawi) Bravehearts	3	0	3	187	270	−83	3	

Source: FIBA
(H) Hosts

28 November 2024
18:30

Boxscore

Kriol Star (Cape Verde)	89–58	(Malawi) Bravehearts
Scoring by quarter: Not published

Kasarani Indoor Arena, Nairobi
Referees: Jerome Oliver Denis (MRI), Didier Shema (RWA)

28 November 2024
20:00

Boxscore

MBB (South Africa)	59–102	(Kenya) Nairobi City Thunder
Scoring by quarter: 19–17, 18–31, 17–22, 5–32
Pts: Mothiba 14; Rebs: Mokwena 12; Asts: Pfachi 6		Pts: Harouna 18; Rebs: Koranga 8 Asts: Iroegbu 7

Kasarani Indoor Arena, Nairobi
Attendance: 2,000
Referees: Michel Djeugoue (CMR), Amr Zahed (EGY), Shabani Shabani (TAN)

29 November 2024
18:30

Bravehearts (Malawi)	61–90	(South Africa) MBB
Scoring by quarter: 22–24, 17–20, 9–28, 13–18
Pts: Banda, Lele 10; Rebs: Banda 12; Asts: Limbe 3		Pts: Pfachi 32; Rebs: Mothiba 10; Asts: Pfachi 6

Kasarani Indoor Arena, Nairobi
Attendance: 200
Referees: Didier Gaga (RWA), Michel Djeugoue (CMR), David João Domingos (ANG)

29 November 2024
20:00

Boxscore

Nairobi City Thunder (Kenya)	104–71	(Cape Verde) Kriol Star
Scoring by quarter: 24–16, 27–15, 21–17, 32–23
Pts: Odero 15; Rebs: Okoth 11; Asts: Adera 4		Pts: McGlynn 17; Rebs: Enoh 11; Asts: Almeida, Richardson 3

Kasarani Indoor Arena, Nairobi
Attendance: 1,500
Referees: Tonton Banza Kalume (COD), Mahamadou Diallo (MLI), Amr Zahed (EGY)

30 November 2024
17:00

Boxscore

MBB (South Africa)	58–63	(Cape Verde) Kriol Star
Scoring by quarter: 15–17, 11–21, 13–7, 19–18
Pts: Mothiba 20; Rebs: Mokwena 15; Asts: Pfachi 4		Pts: McGlynn 20; Rebs: Mendes 13; Asts: Three players 4

Kasarani Indoor Arena, Nairobi
Attendance: 300
Referees: Walelign Fikadu Gebeto (ETH), Mahamadou Diallo (MLI), Jerome Denis (MRI)

30 November 2024
20:00

Boxscore

Bravehearts (Malawi)	68–91	(Kenya) Nairobi City Thunder
Scoring by quarter: 13–20, 20–21, 14–27, 21–23
Pts: Williams 25; Rebs: Banda 15; Asts: Banda 2		Pts: Ogechi 18; Rebs: Diing 10; Asts: Iroegbu 4

Kasarani Indoor Arena, Nairobi
Attendance: 500
Referees: Shabani Shabani (TAN), Francisco Tando (ANG), Didier Shema (RWA)

==== Group B ====
Pos	Team	Pld	W	L	PF	PA	PD	Pts	Qualification
1	(Burundi) Urunani	3	3	0	235	170	+65	6	Advance to final round
2	(Uganda) City Oilers	3	2	1	245	198	+47	5	Advance to final round
3	(South Sudan) Fox	3	1	2	191	228	−37	4	
4	(Zambia) Matero Magic	3	0	3	188	263	−75	3	

Source: FIBA

==== Final round ====
===== Semifinals =====
2 December 2024	Urunani (Burundi)	82–90	(Cape Verde) Kriol Star	Nairobi, Kenya
18:00 (GMT+3)	Scoring by quarter: 18–12, 19–16, 20–32, 25–30
	Pts: Boissy 33; Rebs: Doumbya, Ndikumana 10; Asts: Crawford 10	Boxscore	Pts: McGlynn 35; Rebs: Mendes, Richardson 8 Asts: Lahrichi 6	Arena: Kasarani Indoor Arena; Attendance: 1,000

2 December 2024	Nairobi City Thunder (Kenya)	80–59	(Uganda) City Oilers	Nairobi, Kenya
20:30 (GMT+3)	Scoring by quarter: 18–11, 16–15, 20–19, 18–17
	Pts: Majok 17; Rebs: Majok 10; Asts: Iroegbu 7	Boxscore	Pts: Petty 23; Rebs: Otobo 11; Asts: Jones 3	Arena: Kasarani Indoor Arena; Attendance: 1,000

===== Third place game =====
3 December 2024	City Oilers (Uganda)	75–77	(Burundi) Urunani	Nairobi, Kenya
18:00 (GMT+3)	Scoring by quarter: 18–26, 25–8, 13–24, 19–19
	Pts: Petty 30; Rebs: Otobo 11; Asts: Petty 7	Boxscore	Pts: Crawford 20; Rebs: Doumbya 14; Asts: Ndikumana 5	Arena: Kasarani Indoor Arena; Attendance: 300; Referees: Walelign Fikadu Gebeto (ETH), Erick Omondi Otieno (KEN), Shabani Mohamed (TAN)

===== Final =====
3 December 2024	Nairobi City Thunder (Kenya)	99–86	(Cape Verde) Kriol Star	Nairobi, Kenya
20:30 (GMT+3)	Scoring by quarter: 27–22, 30–19, 23–16, 19–29
	Pts: Diing 20; Rebs: Diing 7 Asts: Adera 14	Boxscore	Pts: Richardson 26; Rebs: Mendes 15; Asts: Lahrichi 11	Arena: Kasarani Indoor Arena; Attendance: 1,000; Referees: Tonton Banza Kalume (COD), Mahamadou Diallo (MLI), Michel Djeugoue (CMR)
