= AfroBasket 2025 squads =

Team rosters at the FIBA AfroBasket 2025

This article displays the rosters for the participating teams at the FIBA AfroBasket 2025.

Age and club are as of 12 August 2025, the start of the tournament.

== Group A ==
=== Cape Verde ===
Cape Verde national basketball team roster
Players
Coaches

Pos.	No.	Name	Age – Date of birth	Height	Club	Ctr.
SG	0	Patrick Lima	30 – 2 May 1995	1.90 m (6 ft 3 in)	CB Andújar	(Spain)
SG	1	Anim Delgado	26 – 3 April 1999	1.90 m (6 ft 3 in)	Jaén Paraíso	(Spain)
F	2	Will Tavares	30 – 18 July 1995	1.95 m (6 ft 5 in)	KB Ylli	(Kosovo)
PF	3	Roesley Sanches	23 – 11 March 2002	2.03 m (6 ft 8 in)	Jaén Paraíso	(Spain)
F	6	Ivan Almeida	36 – 10 May 1989	1.97 m (6 ft 6 in)	Kriol Star	(Cape Verde)
SG	8	Anderson Correia	27 – 31 October 1997	1.95 m (6 ft 5 in)	Kriol Star	(Cape Verde)
SF	9	Joel Almeida	39 – 11 October 1985	1.92 m (6 ft 4 in)	Kriol Star	(Cape Verde)
PF	10	Kenneti Mendes (C)	34 – 17 August 1990	2.03 m (6 ft 8 in)	Kriol Star	(Cape Verde)
PF	12	Amarilson Lopes	29 – 18 August 1995	1.98 m (6 ft 6 in)	Santo André	(Portugal)
C	16	Keven Gomes	29 – 29 October 1995	2.11 m (6 ft 11 in)	CB Benicarló	(Spain)
SF	21	Betinho Gomes	40 – 5 February 1985	2.03 m (6 ft 8 in)	Benfica	(Portugal)
C	22	Edy Tavares	33 – 22 March 1992	2.21 m (7 ft 3 in)	Real Madrid	(Spain)

Head coach

- (Angola) Emanuel Trovoada

Assistant coach(es)

- (Cape Verde) Edmilson Abreu
- (Cape Verde) Manuel Duarte

Legend

- (C) Team captain
- Club – describes last
  club before the tournament
- Age – describes age
  on 12 August 2025

=== DR Congo ===
DR Congo national basketball team roster
Players
Coaches

Pos.	No.	Name	Age – Date of birth	Height	Club	Ctr.
G	1	John Jordan	32 – 7 October 1992	1.80 m (5 ft 11 in)	FUS Rabat	(Morocco)
PG	7	Maxi Munanga Shamba	31 – 25 December 1993	1.90 m (6 ft 3 in)	US Maubeuge	(France)
F	11	Franck Nyembo	19 – 29 May 2006	2.00 m (6 ft 7 in)	Chaux Sport	(Democratic Republic of the Congo)
F	15	Rolly Fula Nganga (C)	32 – 2 February 1993	2.01 m (6 ft 7 in)	Val de Seine Basket	(France)
C	18	Jordan Sakho	28 – 4 April 1997	2.09 m (6 ft 10 in)	CB Breogán	(Spain)
F	20	Isaac Ngoy Mushila	26 – 17 February 1999	1.96 m (6 ft 5 in)	Córdoba CB	(Spain)
PF	21	Evariste Shonganya	34 – 6 April 1991	2.04 m (6 ft 8 in)	Val de Seine Basket	(France)
SG	24	Christian Lutete	28 – 9 October 1996	1.96 m (6 ft 5 in)	KK Bosna Royal	(Bosnia and Herzegovina)
SF	31	Christian Eyenga	36 – 22 June 1989	2.04 m (6 ft 8 in)
PF	33	Mervedi Kasekelayi Miteo	16 – 13 December 2008	2.08 m (6 ft 10 in)	AD Pedro Alvarez	(Spain)
C	34	Garmine Kande	25 – 24 August 1999	2.05 m (6 ft 9 in)	CD Estela	(Spain)
F	55	Djack Kapongo Kabuya	32 – 15 February 1993	1.96 m (6 ft 5 in)	Chaux Sport	(Democratic Republic of the Congo)

Head coach

- (France) Michel Perrin

Assistant coach(es)

- (France) Gaëtan Douet
- (Democratic Republic of the Congo) Muamba Ilunga

Legend

- (C) Team captain
- Club – describes last
  club before the tournament
- Age – describes age
  on 12 August 2025

=== Ivory Coast ===
Côte d'Ivoire national basketball team roster
Players
Coaches

Pos.	No.	Name	Age – Date of birth	Height	Club	Ctr.
PG	0	Assemian Moulare	22 – 21 January 2003	1.87 m (6 ft 2 in)	JA Vichy Basket	(France)
PG	2	Bazoumana Koné	31 – 13 December 1993	1.96 m (6 ft 5 in)	Würzburg Baskets	(Germany)
SG	7	Maxence Dadiet	26 – 2 March 1999	1.92 m (6 ft 4 in)	Toulouse Basket Club	(France)
SG	8	Lionel Kouadio	23 – 1 September 2001	1.92 m (6 ft 4 in)	CB Morón	(Spain)
PG	10	Solo Diabate	38 – 21 July 1987	1.83 m (6 ft 0 in)	Atletico Petroleos	(Angola)
SF	12	Vafessa Fofana	33 – 12 June 1992	2.00 m (6 ft 7 in)	BCM Gravelines Dunkerque	(France)
PF	16	Bali Coulibaly	30 – 3 July 1995	2.01 m (6 ft 7 in)	Caen Basket Calvados	(France)
PF	21	Amadou Sidibe (C)	31 – 25 March 1994	1.83 m (6 ft 0 in)	Soproni KC	(Hungary)
C	22	Sydney Hawmmond	25 – 10 February 2000	2.13 m (7 ft 0 in)	Free agent
C	24	Matt Costello	32 – 5 August 1993	2.08 m (6 ft 10 in)	Valencia Basket	(Spain)
SG	25	Junior Ouattara	25 – 7 July 2000	1.93 m (6 ft 4 in)	Stade Toulousain Basketball	(France)
SF	77	Jean Philippe Dally	29 – 8 March 1996	2.01 m (6 ft 7 in)	JDA Dijon Basket	(France)

Head coach

- (Spain) Miguel Ángel Hoyo

Assistant coach(es)

- (Ivory Coast) Stéphane Konaté
- (Spain) Pablo Abuin

Legend

- (C) Team captain
- Club – describes last
  club before the tournament
- Age – describes age
  on 12 August 2025

=== Rwanda ===
Rwanda national basketball team roster
Players
Coaches

Pos.	No.	Name	Age – Date of birth	Height	Club	Ctr.
SG	0	David Mutabazi	23 – 20 January 2002	1.86 m (6 ft 1 in)	Tigers	(Rwanda)
PF	1	Cadeau de Dieu Furaha	27 – 10 June 1998	2.01 m (6 ft 7 in)	Patriots	(Rwanda)
PG	2	Prince Tokoza Twa	21 – 7 April 2004	1.80 m (5 ft 11 in)	APR	(Rwanda)
SF	3	Bruno Shema	23 – 24 July 2002	2.02 m (6 ft 8 in)	Tigers	(Rwanda)
SF	6	William Robeyns	29 – 23 February 1996	1.91 m (6 ft 3 in)	APR	(Rwanda)
PF	9	Trey Sinze Twa	25 – 12 January 2000	1.95 m (6 ft 5 in)	APR	(Rwanda)
PF	13	Paul Bizima	22 – 23 March 2003	1.98 m (6 ft 6 in)	Tigers	(Rwanda)
PG	15	Ntore Habimana	27 – 15 August 1997	1.96 m (6 ft 5 in)	APR	(Rwanda)
SF	20	Hason Ward	24 – 24 September 2000	2.06 m (6 ft 9 in)	Scarborough Shooting Stars	(Canada)
SG	23	Steven Hagumintwari	31 – 1 October 1993	1.93 m (6 ft 4 in)	Patriots	(Rwanda)
SF	24	Prince Muhizi	29 – 19 January 1996		REG	(Rwanda)
PF	34	Dieudonné Ndizeye (C)	29 – 14 October 1995	1.98 m (6 ft 6 in)	Patriots	(Rwanda)

Head coach

- (Senegal) Cheikh Sarr

Assistant coach(es)

- (Rwanda) Yves Murenzi
- (Rwanda) Sunny Niyomugabo

Legend

- (C) Team captain
- Club – describes last
  club before the tournament
- Age – describes age
  on 12 August 2025

== Group B ==
=== Cameroon ===
Cameroon men's national basketball team roster
Players
Coaches

Pos.	No.	Name	Age – Date of birth	Height	Club	Ctr.
PF	00	Paul Eboua	25 – 15 February 2000	2.03 m (6 ft 8 in)	Trapani Shark	(Italy)
SG	4	Valentin Lele	21 – 12 May 2004	1.88 m (6 ft 2 in)	BEAC Basketball	(Cameroon)
C	5	Amadou Sieni	18 – 5 January 2007	2.16 m (7 ft 1 in)	Varese Academy	(Italy)
F	7	Tamenang Choh	27 – 17 July 1998	1.98 m (6 ft 6 in)	VfL AstroStars Bochum	(Germany)
PG	8	Samir Gbetkom	27 – 24 March 1998	1.91 m (6 ft 3 in)	Antibes Sharks	(France)
F	11	Brice Eyaga	26 – 26 November 1998	2.05 m (6 ft 9 in)	JA Vichy Basket	(France)
PF	21	Yves Missi	21 – 14 May 2004	2.08 m (6 ft 10 in)	New Orleans Pelicans	(United States)
SG	23	Fabien Ateba (C)	34 – 30 May 1991	1.95 m (6 ft 5 in)	Union Tarbes-Lourdes	(France)
F	25	Roger Moute a Bidias	30 – 22 April 1995	1.99 m (6 ft 6 in)	CB Lucentum Alicante	(Spain)
F	26	Jordan Bayehe	25 – 16 October 1999	2.06 m (6 ft 9 in)	Dolomiti Energia Trento	(Italy)
PF	44	Williams Narace	28 – 17 March 1997	2.03 m (6 ft 8 in)	Le Mans Sarthe	(France)
SG	68	Jeremiah Hill	29 – 4 September 1995	1.88 m (6 ft 2 in)	Élan Chalon	(France)

Head coach

- (Cameroon) Alfred Aboya

Assistant coach(es)

- (Spain) Mikel Ereño

Legend

- (C) Team captain
- Club – describes last
  club before the tournament
- Age – describes age
  on 12 August 2025

=== Madagascar ===
Madagascar men's national basketball team roster
Players
Coaches

Pos.	No.	Name	Age – Date of birth	Height	Club
F	1	Elly Randriamampionona	28 – 20 July 1997	1.88 m (6 ft 2 in)	COSPN	(Madagascar)
G	4	Mathias M'Madi	20 – 2 June 2005	1.94 m (6 ft 4 in)	CB Morón	(Spain)
G	6	Livio Ratianarivo	29 – 24 April 1996	1.86 m (6 ft 1 in)	COSPN	(Madagascar)
SG	7	Kiady Razanamahenina	28 – 15 December 1996	1.84 m (6 ft 0 in)	Jura Basket	(Switzerland)
PF	10	Hasina Rasolonandrianina	22 – 17 October 2002	1.90 m (6 ft 3 in)	FANDRASA	(Madagascar)
C	11	Lovasoa Andriatsarafara	21 – 17 January 2004	2.07 m (6 ft 9 in)	Urbaine Tamatave	(Madagascar)
C	12	Alpha Solondrainy	26 – 4 May 1999	1.98 m (6 ft 6 in)	Saint-Vallier	(France)
C	15	Anthony Rasolomanana	28 – 2 May 1997	1.98 m (6 ft 6 in)	COSPN	(Madagascar)
G	21	Austin Rasolonjatovo	23 – 21 December 2001	1.86 m (6 ft 1 in)	COSPN	(Madagascar)
PF	22	Sitraka Raharimanantoanina	24 – 20 January 2001	2.07 m (6 ft 9 in)	ALM Évreux Basket	(France)
PG	53	Rija Lahontan (C)	33 – 30 June 1992	1.70 m (5 ft 7 in)	Ail Rousset Basket	(France)
C	91	Fiary Rakotonirina	27 – 5 September 1997	1.97 m (6 ft 6 in)	GNBC	(Madagascar)

Head coach

- (Canada) John Douaglin

Assistant coach(es)

- (Canada) Nicolas Bertault
- (Madagascar) Tiarainiaina Rakotonanahary

Legend

- (C) Team captain
- Club – describes last
  club before the tournament
- Age – describes age
  on 12 August 2025

=== Nigeria ===
Nigeria men's national basketball team roster
Players
Coaches

Pos.	No.	Name	Age – Date of birth	Height	Club	Ctr.
C	0	Kaodirichi Akobundu-Ehiogu	25 – 7 October 1999	2.09 m (6 ft 10 in)	Basquet Manresa	(Spain)
G	1	Mike Nuga	27 – 27 December 1997	1.88 m (6 ft 2 in)	Edmonton Stingers	(Canada)
G	2	Josh Okogie	26 – 1 September 1998	1.93 m (6 ft 4 in)	Charlotte Hornets	(United States)
G	3	Caleb Agada	30 – 31 August 1994	1.96 m (6 ft 5 in)	Al Ahli	(Libya)
SF	5	Stan Okoye	34 – 10 April 1991	1.98 m (6 ft 6 in)	MoraBanc Andorra	(Spain)
PF	7	Emmanuel Omogbo	30 – 28 May 1995	2.03 m (6 ft 8 in)	UB Chartres Métropole	(France)
SF	8	Ugo Simon	23 – 25 February 2002	1.96 m (6 ft 5 in)	A Dil Polisportiva Vigor	(Italy)
PF	9	Martins Igbanu	28 – 12 April 1997	2.03 m (6 ft 8 in)	Tokyo Hachioji Bee Trains	(Japan)
PF	13	Talib Zanna	34 – 1 October 1990	2.06 m (6 ft 9 in)	Tauranga Whai	(New Zealand)
F	17	Christian Mekowulu	30 – 17 March 1995	2.05 m (6 ft 9 in)	Akita Northern Happinets	(Japan)
PF	23	Devine Eke	29 – 29 July 1996	2.03 m (6 ft 8 in)	ASC Ville de Dakar	(Senegal)
G	34	Ike Nwamu (C)	32 – 3 June 1993	1.96 m (6 ft 5 in)	UB Chartres Métropole	(France)

Head coach

- (Nigeria) Abdulrahman Mohammed

Assistant coach(es)

- (Nigeria) Deji Akindele

Legend

- (C) Team captain
- Club – describes last
  club before the tournament
- Age – describes age
  on 12 August 2025

=== Tunisia ===
Tunisia men's national basketball team roster
Players
Coaches

Pos.	No.	Name	Age – Date of birth	Height	Club	Ctr.
PG	4	Omar Abada	32 – 20 April 1993	1.89 m (6 ft 2 in)	Club Africain	(Tunisia)
G	6	Achref Gannouni (C)	28 – 16 April 1997	1.92 m (6 ft 4 in)	Club Africain	(Tunisia)
G	7	Oussama Marnaoui	26 – 16 June 1999	1.93 m (6 ft 4 in)	JS Kairouan	(Tunisia)
PG	8	Bilel Jaziri	27 – 25 March 1998	1.92 m (6 ft 4 in)	US Monastir	(Tunisia)
SG	9	Jawhar Jawadi	28 – 14 July 1997	1.92 m (6 ft 4 in)	Club Africain	(Tunisia)
PF	10	Yacine Toumi	24 – 12 October 2000	2.04 m (6 ft 8 in)	Seton Hall Pirates	(United States)
C	13	Bechir Ben Yahia	27 – 1 May 1998	2.05 m (6 ft 9 in)	US Monastir	(Tunisia)
F	15	Wassef Methnani	27 – 7 August 1998	2.00 m (6 ft 7 in)	JS Kairouan	(Tunisia)
PG	20	Mehdi Seyeh	34 – 4 September 1990	1.82 m (6 ft 0 in)	US Monastir	(Tunisia)
F	21	Mohamed Abbassi	34 – 28 March 1991	2.04 m (6 ft 8 in)	JS Kairouan	(Tunisia)
PF	32	Ahmed Addami	28 – 14 July 1997	2.03 m (6 ft 8 in)	JS Kairouan	(Tunisia)
C	99	Mohamed Fares Ochi	26 – 8 February 1999	2.10 m (6 ft 11 in)	Real Valladolid	(Spain)

Head coach

- (France) Mehdy Mary

Assistant coach(es)

- (Tunisia) Mourad Bel Hassine

Legend

- (C) Team captain
- Club – describes last
  club before the tournament
- Age – describes age
  on 12 August 2025

== Group C ==
=== Angola ===
Angola men's national basketball team roster
Players
Coaches

Pos.	No.	Name	Age – Date of birth	Height	Club	Ctr.
F	0	Eduardo Francisco	21 – 5 November 2003	2.00 m (6 ft 7 in)	Benfica	(Portugal)
G	1	Selton Miguel	24 – 24 October 2000	1.94 m (6 ft 4 in)	Maryland Terrapins	(United States)
G	3	Gerson Gonçalves (C)	29 – 29 March 1996	1.93 m (6 ft 4 in)	Petro de Luanda	(Angola)
PG	5	Childe Dundão	27 – 17 May 1998	1.67 m (5 ft 6 in)	Petro de Luanda	(Angola)
C	13	João Fernandes	32 – 1 December 1992	2.00 m (6 ft 7 in)	Oliveirense	(Portugal)
PF	15	Abou Gakou	28 – 27 May 1997	2.01 m (6 ft 7 in)	Petro de Luanda	(Angola)
PF	22	Silvio De Sousa	26 – 7 October 1998	2.03 m (6 ft 8 in)	Free agent
C	24	Bruno Fernando	26 – 15 August 1998	2.06 m (6 ft 9 in)	Real Madrid	(Spain)
C	34	Kevin Kokila	23 – 3 September 2001	2.05 m (6 ft 9 in)	JL Bourg Basket	(France)
C	44	Jilson Bango	26 – 6 January 1999	2.08 m (6 ft 10 in)	Fenerbaçhe	(Turkey)
SG	47	Milton Valente	26 – 28 September 1998	1.98 m (6 ft 6 in)	Free agent
C	66	Braz Macachi	23 – 5 September 2001	2.02 m (6 ft 8 in)	AD Galomar	(Portugal)

Head coach

- (Spain) Josep Clarós

Assistant coach(es)

- (Angola) Miguel Lutonda
- (Angola) Aníbal Moreira

Legend

- (C) Team captain
- Club – describes last
  club before the tournament
- Age – describes age
  on 12 August 2025

=== Guinea ===
Guinea men's national basketball team roster
Players
Coaches

Pos.	No.	Name	Age – Date of birth	Height	Club	Ctr.
PG	0	Souley Boum	26 – 26 January 1999	1.91 m (6 ft 3 in)	MKS Dąbrowa Górnicza	(Poland)
PG	1	Ahmed Doumbia	35 – 19 August 1989	1.95 m (6 ft 5 in)	Rivers Hoopers	(Nigeria)
SF	3	Ousmane Kaba	23 – 17 January 2002	1.91 m (6 ft 3 in)	Poissy Basket	(France)
F	5	Sekou Sylla	25 – 31 March 2000	1.95 m (6 ft 5 in)	KK Skupi	(North Macedonia)
F	11	Alpha Diallo	28 – 29 June 1997	2.01 m (6 ft 7 in)	AS Monaco Basket	(France)
SG	12	Nour Gassim Toure	16 – 23 October 2008	1.94 m (6 ft 4 in)	Principia	(United States)
PF	13	Tidjan Keita	28 – 30 November 1996	2.05 m (6 ft 9 in)	CB Tizona	(Spain)
PF	14	Ousmane Drame	33 – 15 December 1991	2.04 m (6 ft 8 in)	Start Lublin	(Poland)
SG	21	Ibrahima Doumbouya	27 – 7 October 1997	1.98 m (6 ft 6 in)	Calgary Surge	(Canada)
PF	23	Cheick Condé	33 – 20 June 1992	2.04 m (6 ft 8 in)	Union Rennes 35	(France)
C	25	Mamadi Diakite	28 – 21 January 1997	2.06 m (6 ft 9 in)	Valley Suns	(United States)
PF	35	Mohamed Queta	30 – 1 May 1995	2.04 m (6 ft 8 in)	Union Tarbes-Lourdes	(France)

Head coach

- (Austria) Nedeljko Ašćerić

Assistant coach(es)

- (Senegal) Souleymane Camara

Legend

- (C) Team captain
- Club – describes last
  club before the tournament
- Age – describes age
  on 12 August 2025

=== Libya ===
Libya national basketball team roster
Players
Coaches

Pos.	No.	Name	Age – Date of birth	Height	Club	Ctr.
SG	2	Ali Madi	26 – 17 February 1999	1.90 m (6 ft 3 in)	Al Ittihad Tripoli	(Libya)
G	5	Naseim Badrush	26 – 13 October 1998	1.89 m (6 ft 2 in)	Al Ahli Tripoli	(Libya)
F	8	Adrees Zeew	25 – 10 May 2000	1.98 m (6 ft 6 in)	Al Ahli Benghazi	(Libya)
PF	9	Sofian Hamad (C)	26 – 16 October 1998	2.01 m (6 ft 7 in)	Al Ahli Benghazi	(Libya)
C	11	Abdulgader Rezg	28 – 28 January 1997	2.10 m (6 ft 11 in)	Al Ittihad Tripoli	(Libya)
F	14	Abdulajabar Aboufardah	24 – 1 December 2000	1.93 m (6 ft 4 in)	Al Ahli Tripoli	(Libya)
PF	15	Wajdi Dawo	36 – 29 October 1988	2.00 m (6 ft 7 in)	Al Ahli Tripoli	(Libya)
PF	23	Ghayth Almaghribi	26 – 25 January 1999	2.04 m (6 ft 8 in)	Al Ahli Benghazi	(Libya)
PG	30	Mahmoud Benalhaj	34 – 25 January 1991	1.89 m (6 ft 2 in)	Al Ahli Benghazi	(Libya)
G	31	Ali Arheemah	22 – 3 March 2003	1.87 m (6 ft 2 in)	Al Ittihad Tripoli	(Libya)
PG	98	Ahmed Algharabi	27 – 12 June 1998	1.85 m (6 ft 1 in)	Al Ahli Tripoli	(Libya)
F	99	Mohamed Buzgaiya	26 – 17 January 1999	1.99 m (6 ft 6 in)	Al-Nasr SC	(Libya)

Head coach

- (United States) Sam Vincent

Assistant coach(es)

- (Libya) Nabil Kabalan
- (United States) Dean Murray

Legend

- (C) Team captain
- Club – describes last
  club before the tournament
- Age – describes age
  on 12 August 2025

=== South Sudan ===
South Sudan men's national basketball team roster
Players
Coaches

Pos.	No.	Name	Age – Date of birth	Height	Club	Ctr.
C	0	Jo Lual-Acuil	31 – 26 April 1994	2.13 m (7 ft 0 in)	Perth Wildcats	(Australia)
SF	1	Nuni Omot (C)	30 – 3 October 1994	2.06 m (6 ft 9 in)	APR BBC	(Rwanda)
PF	3	Emmanuel Akot	26 – 17 March 1999	2.01 m (6 ft 7 in)	Winnipeg Sea Bears	(Canada)
PG	4	Mareng Gatkuoth	25 – 10 September 1999	1.98 m (6 ft 6 in)	Pazi BBC	(Tanzania)
SF	7	Deng Deng	33 – 5 January 1992	2.03 m (6 ft 8 in)	Al Ittihad	(Egypt)
SG	8	Junior Madut	28 – 26 March 1997	1.98 m (6 ft 6 in)	Manchester Basketball	(England)
PG	10	Kendale McCullum	29 – 31 May 1996	1.85 m (6 ft 1 in)	Promitheas Patras B.C.	(Greece)
SG	11	Both Gach	26 – 4 February 1999	2.01 m (6 ft 7 in)	JL Bourg	(France)
PF	13	Majok Deng	32 – 1 March 1993	2.05 m (6 ft 9 in)	Tasmania JackJumpers	(Australia)
SG	14	Peter Jok	31 – 30 March 1994	1.98 m (6 ft 6 in)	Cibona	(Croatia)
PF	23	Kur Kuath	27 – 12 August 1998	2.08 m (6 ft 10 in)	CB Gran Canaria	(Spain)
PF	32	Wenyen Gabriel	28 – 26 March 1997	2.08 m (6 ft 10 in)	Bayern Munich	(Germany)

Head coach

- (South Sudan) / (United Kingdom) Luol Deng

Assistant coach(es)

- (South Sudan) Ajou Deng
- (United Kingdom) Dzaflo Larkai

Legend

- (C) Team captain
- Club – describes last
  club before the tournament
- Age – describes age
  on 12 August 2025

== Group D ==
=== Egypt ===
Egypt men's national basketball team – 2023 FIBA Basketball World Cup roster roster
Players
Coaches

Pos.	No.	Name	Age – Date of birth	Height	Club	Ctr.
F	1	Ibrahim Zahran	21 – 13 March 2004	1.94 m (6 ft 4 in)	Al Ahly	(Egypt)
G	2	Adam Moussa	23 – 14 July 2002	1.90 m (6 ft 3 in)	Tarleton State Texans	(United States)
G	4	Ehab Amin	30 – 1 August 1995	1.85 m (6 ft 1 in)	Al Ahly	(Egypt)
PF	5	Amr Gendy (C)	34 – 14 June 1991	1.93 m (6 ft 4 in)	Al Ahly	(Egypt)
SG	6	Yassin Nasr (C)	21 – 12 November 2003	1.87 m (6 ft 2 in)	Sporting	(Egypt)
SF	9	Mohamed Mohamed (C)	29 – 6 July 1996	1.79 m (5 ft 10 in)	Al Ittihad	(Egypt)
PF	10	Anas Mahmoud	30 – 9 May 1995	2.14 m (7 ft 0 in)	Al Ittihad	(Egypt)
SG	12	Youssef Aboushousha	32 – 9 June 1993	1.93 m (6 ft 4 in)	Al Ittihad	(Egypt)
C	15	Ahmed Khalaf	26 – 24 February 1999	2.06 m (6 ft 9 in)	Al Ittihad	(Egypt)
C	20	Patrick Gardner	26 – 16 June 1999	2.11 m (6 ft 11 in)	Petro de Luanda	(Angola)
PF	28	Khaled Abdelgawad	26 – 15 February 1999	2.04 m (6 ft 8 in)	Zamalek	(Egypt)
C	55	Omar Oraby	33 – 8 September 1991	2.18 m (7 ft 2 in)	Al Ahly	(Egypt)

Head coach

- (Canada) Mohamed El Kardani

Assistant coach(es)

- (Egypt) Ramy Abdalla
- (Egypt) Mohamed Selim

Legend

- (C) Team captain
- Club – describes last
  club before the tournament
- Age – describes age
  on 12 August 2025

=== Mali ===
Mali men's national basketball team roster
Players
Coaches

Pos.	No.	Name	Age – Date of birth	Height	Club	Ctr.
PG	4	Siriman Kanoute	23 – 25 September 2001	1.76 m (5 ft 9 in)	SLUC Nancy Basket	(France)
F	5	Mohamed Wague	25 – 17 December 1999	2.08 m (6 ft 10 in)	Oklahoma Sooners	(United States)
PG	8	Allaye Togo	22 – 7 August 2003	1.83 m (6 ft 0 in)	Stade Malien	(Mali)
SF	9	Ibrahima Haidara (C)	32 – 9 October 1992	2.05 m (6 ft 9 in)	Nantes	(France)
SF	10	Fousseyni Drame	24 – 18 August 2000	2.00 m (6 ft 7 in)	Free agent
C	11	Oumar Ballo	23 – 13 July 2002	2.08 m (6 ft 10 in)	Free agent
PF	12	Mahamane Coulibaly	24 – 28 January 2001	2.06 m (6 ft 9 in)	Stade Malien	(Mali)
SG	14	Hassan Drame	24 – 18 August 2000	2.00 m (6 ft 7 in)	AS Police	(Senegal)
F	20	Tamandjan Konate	22 – 2 November 2002	1.99 m (6 ft 6 in)	Free agent
C	24	Moulaye Sissoko	25 – 17 November 1999	1.85 m (6 ft 1 in)	Free agent
C	31	Aliou Diarra	23 – 31 December 2001	2.08 m (6 ft 10 in)	APR BBC	(Rwanda)
PF	35	Mamoudou Diarra	27 – 4 October 1997	1.95 m (6 ft 5 in)	Free agent

Head coach

- (Mali) Alhadji Dicko

Assistant coach(es)

- (Mali) Abdoulaye Coulibaly
- (Mali) Boubacar Kanouté

Legend

- (C) Team captain
- Club – describes last
  club before the tournament
- Age – describes age
  on 12 August 2025

=== Senegal ===
Senegal men's national basketball team roster
Players
Coaches

Pos.	No.	Name	Age – Date of birth	Height	Club	Ctr.
SG	0	Brancou Badio (C)	26 – 17 February 1999	1.88 m (6 ft 2 in)	Valencia Basket	(Spain)
F	1	Ousmane Ndiaye	21 – 19 March 2004	2.10 m (6 ft 11 in)	Tornadoes Sports Academy	(Grenada)
SG	3	Makhtar Gueye	28 – 7 January 1997	2.09 m (6 ft 10 in)	ASC Ville de Dakar	(Senegal)
G	5	Jean Jacques Boissy	25 – 28 January 2000	1.83 m (6 ft 0 in)	REG BBC	(Rwanda)
PF	7	Ibrahima Faye	28 – 10 January 1997	2.09 m (6 ft 10 in)	Shanxi Loongs	(China)
C	11	Ibrahima Diallo	25 – 10 December 1999	2.13 m (7 ft 0 in)	Austin Spurs	(United States)
C	16	Ibou Badji	22 – 13 October 2002	2.11 m (6 ft 11 in)	Wisconsin Herd	(United States)
C	29	Gora Camara	24 – 12 April 2001	2.12 m (6 ft 11 in)	Rinascita Basket Rimini	(Italy)
SG	33	Babacar Diallo	24 – 30 December 2000	2.00 m (6 ft 7 in)	High Point Panthers	(United States)
PF	43	Amar Sylla	23 – 1 October 2001	2.05 m (6 ft 9 in)	Bilbao Basket	(Spain)
G	45	Karim Mané	25 – 16 May 2000	1.93 m (6 ft 4 in)	Calgary Surge	(Canada)
F	77	Pape Moustapha Diop	29 – 1 January 1996	2.02 m (6 ft 8 in)	JA Vichy Basket	(France)

Head coach

- (Senegal) DeSagana Diop

Assistant coach(es)

- (Senegal) Mamadou Gueye
- (Senegal) Elhadj Mbodji

Legend

- (C) Team captain
- Club – describes last
  club before the tournament
- Age – describes age
  on 12 August 2025

=== Uganda ===
Uganda men's national basketball team roster
Players
Coaches

Pos.	No.	Name	Age – Date of birth	Height	Club	Ctr.
G	0	Naseef Lubowa	20 – 20 December 2004	1.88 m (6 ft 2 in)	Brewster Academy	(United States)
SG	2	Tejan Rugette	17 – 16 October 2007	1.91 m (6 ft 3 in)	Lee Academy Prep	(United States)
SG	6	Robinson Opong (C)	36 – 10 May 1989	1.90 m (6 ft 3 in)	MBB Basketball	(South Africa)
SG	7	Ivan Muhwezi	27 – 19 January 1998	1.82 m (6 ft 0 in)	City Oilers	(Uganda)
PG	8	Fayed Baale	23 – 28 December 2001	1.73 m (5 ft 8 in)	Uganda Christian University	(Uganda)
C	9	Deng Geu	28 – 1 January 1997	2.06 m (6 ft 9 in)	Horsens IC	(Denmark)
C	11	Joel Kayira	24 – 31 March 2001	2.08 m (6 ft 10 in)	Uganda Christian University	(Uganda)
G	14	Emmanuel Wombala	25 – 20 January 2000	1.96 m (6 ft 5 in)	EN Baskets Schwelm	(Germany)
C	21	Jonathan Komagum	26 – 15 November 1998	2.05 m (6 ft 9 in)	London Lions	(United Kingdom)
F	24	Jacksen Moni	22 – 20 February 2003	2.01 m (6 ft 7 in)	North Dakota State Bison	(United States)

Head coach

- (United States) George Galanopoulos

Assistant coach(es)

- (Uganda) Mandy Juruni
- (Uganda) Andrew Senyondwa

Legend

- (C) Team captain
- Club – describes last
  club before the tournament
- Age – describes age
  on 12 August 2025
