= Makhtar Gueye =

Makhtar Gueye may refer to:

- Makhtar Gueye (footballer) (born 1997), Senegalese footballer
- Makhtar Gueye (basketball) (born 1997), Senegalese basketball player
