= BDF V =

- League: Botswana Basketball League
- Location: Gaborone, Botswana
- Head coach: Israel Mophato
- Championships: 1 (2024)

The Botswana Defense Forces V, shortly known as BDF V, is a Botswanan semi-professional basketball team based in Gaborone. The team is owned by the Botswana Defence Force and plays in the Botswana Basketball League (BBL).

They won the BBL championship in 2024 after defeating the Orapa Juggernauts in the finals, which earned them a maiden qualification to the Road to BAL tournament. The team is currently led by Israel Mophato.

== Players ==
=== Current roster ===
The following was BDF V's roster for the 2025 BAL qualification.

Note: Flags indicate national team eligibility at FIBA-sanctioned events. Players may hold other non-FIBA nationalities not displayed.

BDF V roster
Players
Coaches

Pos.	No.	Nat.	Name	Ht.	Wt.
		(Botswana)	Baumake, Modiri
SG		(Zimbabwe)	Chidzomba, Munyaradzi	1.91 m (6 ft 3 in)
		(Zimbabwe)	Choto, Tendai
G		(Botswana)	Gaborone, Thuto	1.88 m (6 ft 2 in)
		(Botswana)	Kebaneetswe, Onneile
		(Botswana)	Malebye, Immanuel
C		(Botswana)	Motswadira, Dingani	2.11 m (6 ft 11 in)
G		(Botswana)	Ndawanyana, Kesaobaka	1.91 m (6 ft 3 in)
SF		(Zimbabwe)	Ndyara, Tanaka	1.85 m (6 ft 1 in)
		(Zimbabwe)	Pedzi, Tanonoka
		(Botswana)	Rabothaako, Karabo
G		(Botswana)	Ramabu, Botsile	2.03 m (6 ft 8 in)

Head coach

- (Botswana) Israel Mophato

Legend

- (C) Team captain
- Injured

- Roster
Updated: November 1, 2024
