= Fox Basketball Club =

Fox
- League: Road to BAL
- Founded: January 24, 2024; 13 months ago
- History: Fox Basketball Club (2024–present)
- Arena: Nimititalata Basketball Stadium
- Location: Juba, South Sudan
- Chairman: Manut Tong Atak
- Head coach: Ajou Deng

Fox Basketball Club is a South Sudanese basketball team based in Juba. Founded in 2024, the team currently plays in the Road to BAL, as the second team from South Sudan to compete in the tournament's history.

== History ==
The club was founded on January 24, 2024, and was headed by chairman Manut Tong Atak. The first head coach was Madut Ayuel. That year, Fox played in a qualifying tournament for the Road to BAL, organized by the South Sudan Basketball Federation (SSBF). They defeated Cobra Sport in the semifinals, and Nile Spartans in the final to claim a spot in the continental tournament. Fox was the second team from the country to play in the Road to BAL, behind Cobra Sport.

In October 2024, they made their continental debut, under head coach Mandy Juruni. After a 3–2 record in the first phase, they were granted a wild card by FIBA Africa to enter the Elite 16 round, from which point Ajou Deng took over coaching responsibilities.

== Arena ==
Fox plays its home games at the Nimititalata Basketball Stadium, which has capacity for 2,000 people, and is used both during day and nighttime.

== Players ==
=== Current roster ===
The following is Fox Basketball Club's roster in the first round of the 2025 BAL qualification:

Note: Flags indicate national team eligibility at FIBA-sanctioned events. Players may hold other non-FIBA nationalities not displayed.

Fox Basketball Club roster
Players
Coaches

Pos.	No.	Nat.	Name	Ht.	Wt.
SG		(South Sudan)	Anthony, Tony	1.91 m (6 ft 3 in)
		(Democratic Republic of the Congo)	Banza, Joel
F		(United States)	Gabriel, Gob	2.01 m (6 ft 7 in)	79 kg (174 lb)
F		(South Sudan)	Garang, Mayom	2.01 m (6 ft 7 in)
G		(Australia)	Garbrah, Jr., Stephen	1.83 m (6 ft 0 in)	88 kg (194 lb)
F		(United States) (South Sudan)	Adub, Aluk Lual	1.98 m (6 ft 6 in)	91 kg (201 lb)
F		(South Sudan)	Malek, Marial	1.98 m (6 ft 6 in)	82 kg (181 lb)
G		(South Sudan)	Malual, Malual	1.88 m (6 ft 2 in)
		(South Sudan)	Muyira, Peter
G/F		(Uganda)	Obleng, Peter	1.93 m (6 ft 4 in)
PF		(South Sudan) (Australia)	Puondak, Makuei	2.03 m (6 ft 8 in)	95 kg (209 lb)

Head coach

- (South Sudan) Ajou Deng

Assistant coach(es)

- (South Sudan) Wal Duoil

Legend

- (C) Team captain
- Injured

- Roster
Updated: November 28, 2024
