= Jaylen Bland =

American basketball player (born 1993)

ABC Fighters
- Position: Point guard
- League: Road to BAL

Personal information
- Born: March 29, 1993 (age 33)
- Listed height: 6 ft 3 in (1.91 m)
- Listed weight: 205 lb (93 kg)

Career information
- High school: Arthur Hill (Saginaw, Michigan); Cleveland (Reseda, California)
- College: Murray State (2011–2012); College of the Canyons (2012–2013); UC Riverside (2014–2016)
- NBA draft: 2016: undrafted
- Playing career: 2016–present

Career history
- 2016–2017: Salt Lake City Stars
- 2017–2018: AB Contern
- 2018: Caballeros de Culiacán
- 2018–2019: Sudbury Five
- 2019: Fraser Valley Bandits
- 2019–2020: Sudbury Five
- 2021–2022: Wisconsin Herd
- 2022–2023: Sudbury Five
- 2023: Halcones de Ciudad Obregón
- 2023–2024: Tenuun Olziy Metal
- 2024: Windsor Express
- 2024–present: ABC Fighters

Career highlights
- NBL Canada Newcomer of the Year (2019)

Jaylen Jowan D. Bland (born March 29, 1993) is an American professional basketball player for the ABC Fighters of the Road to BAL. He played college basketball for Murray State, College of the Canyons, and UC Riverside. In 2019, he was named NBL Canada Newcomer of the Year.

== College career ==
Bland signed with Murray State out of high school but decided to transfer after averaging 1.7 points per game as a freshman. Bland played one season at College of the Canyons before joining UC Riverside. Bland holds the UCR program record with 118 3-pointers in a season. As a senior, Bland was fourth in Division I in made 3-pointers. He was named second-team all-Big West after averaging 16.1 points per game, shooting .404 percent from behind the arc.

== Professional career ==
Bland played for the Salt Lake City Stars of the NBA G League after being drafted 15th overall in the D League draft. He averaged 5.7 points and 2.1 rebounds per game in 39 games. In August 2017, he signed with AB Contern in Luxembourg. In May 2018, Bland signed with Caballeros de Culiacán in Mexico.

Bland signed with the Sudbury Five in November 2018. In the 2018–19 season, Bland finished ninth in NBL Canada in scoring with 18.8 points per game in addition to 5.9 rebounds and 2.3 assists per game. He earned player of the week honors on November 18, 2018. He was named league newcomer of the year. Bland joined the Fraser Valley Bandits of the Canadian Elite Basketball League after the season. He was released by the Bandits on May 23. On November 4, he re-signed with the Five. Bland averaged 24.2 points, 6.0 rebounds, and 4.0 assists per game. He was named to the Second Team All-NBL Canada.

=== Wisconsin Herd (2021–2022) ===
Bland was selected with the ninth pick of the third round of the 2021 NBA G League draft by the Wisconsin Herd. On February 12, 2022, Bland was waived by the Wisconsin Herd.

In December 2023, Bland joined Tenuun Olziy Metal in Mongolia. He led the team to an appearance in the finals, where they lost to Khasin Khuleguud.

In November 2024, Bland joined the ABC Fighters of Ivory Coast in the 2025 BAL qualification games.
