= Ajou Deng =

Sudanese-British basketball player

Fox Basketball Club
- Title: Head coach
- League: Road to BAL

Personal information
- Born: 24 December 1978 (age 47) Wau, Sudan (now South Sudan)
- Listed height: 6 ft 11 in (2.11 m)
- Listed weight: 250 lb (113 kg)

Career information
- High school: St. Thomas More (Oakdale, Connecticut)
- College: UConn (1999–2001); Fairfield (2001–2003)
- NBA draft: 2003: undrafted
- Playing career: 2004–2009
- Position: Center
- Coaching career: 2020–present

Career history

Playing
- 2004–2005: Brighton Bears
- 2005: Scottish Rocks
- 2006: Guildford Heat
- 2007–2008: Guildford Heat
- 2008: Slavia Tu Kosice
- 2008–2009: London Capital

Coaching
- 2020: South Sudan
- 2024–present: Fox
- 2021–present: South Sudan (Assistant)

Career highlights
- Third-team Parade All-American (1998)

Ajou Deng (born 24 December 1978) is a South Sudanese–British retired professional basketball player and current coach. He is the son of Aldo Deng, a former Sudanese politician and is the brother of former NBA player Luol Deng.

== College basketball ==
The 6’11" center played his university basketball in Connecticut with the Fairfield Stags from 2001 through 2003 after two years playing for the University of Connecticut Huskies from 1999 to 2001. While playing basketball for the Uconn Huskies, his nickname was "Juice." His career was known for not measuring up to the tremendous amount of hype that preceded his arrival at the Huskies. College basketball analysts like Billy Packer and Dick Vitale once predicted that he could be the best player ever there.

== Professional basketball ==
After graduating from Fairfield, Deng returned to Great Britain, where his family had been granted asylum, and joined the professional team Brighton Bears for the 2004–05 season. In 37 games Deng scored 428 points, an average of 11.57 per game, and averaged nearly 10 rebounds and 1.5 blocks. He started the following season with the Scottish Rocks before joining the Guildford Heat.

He played 37 games during the 2005–06 season, scored 398 points – an average of 10.76 per game – and had 6.43 rebounds and one block per game. Deng was named BBL player of the month in March 2006 and was a BBL All-Star that year as well. He won a BBL Cup winner's medal with Brighton his first year as a professional.

Deng sat out the 2006–07 season with an ankle injury. He underwent treatment in Chicago, United States, where he stayed with his brother, Luol Deng, a forward for the Chicago Bulls of the NBA. Deng returned to the Heat on 7 December 2007 to replace Carlton Aaron, who had recently been cut by the team.

Deng left the Guildford Heat in February 2008 before the BBL Trophy Final to join Slavia Tu Kosice in Slovakia.

== Coaching career ==
In 2020, Deng was the head coach of the South Sudan national basketball team. He was the head coach of the South Sudanes team Fox Basketball Club in the Elite 16 of the 2025 BAL qualification.
