= Aldo Deng =

South Sudanese politician

Aldo Deng is a former Sudanese politician and father of several professional basketball players.

== Biography ==
In 1988, Deng sent his wife and children to Alexandria to avoid the escalating Second Sudanese Civil War. The next year, Omar al-Bashir led a military coup that took control of the government, and Deng was arrested at gunpoint, spending three months in prison. Omar al-Bashir released Deng so that Deng could negotiate with the Sudan People's Liberation Army of southern Sudan, but in 1993, Deng fled to the United Kingdom and claimed political asylum. Shortly afterwards, he travelled to Egypt to collect his family, and they settled in South Norwood, London. He has since organized several charities to support women, children, and schools in Sudan. After the end of the civil war in 2005 and the independence of South Sudan in 2011, he returned to serve on the committee that wrote the new country's constitution.

Deng is the father of 16 children, several of whom have become notable for their basketball prowess. Son Luol Deng attended Duke University and has played for the Minnesota Timberwolves and the Chicago Bulls of the National Basketball Association; sons Ajou Deng and Deng Deng have played in the British Basketball League; and daughter Arek Deng played for the University of Delaware.
