= Kadji Sports Academy (basketball) =

KSA
- League: Elite Messieurs
- Established: 1995
- History: Kadji Sports Academy; 1995–present
- Location: Békoko, Douala, Cameroon
- President: Kenneth Kadji
- Head coach: Auguste Siedjou Nouwou
- Ownership: Kenneth Kadji
- Championships: 1 (2024)

Kadji Sports Academy, commonly known simply as KSA, is a Cameroonian basketball team based in Békoko, Douala. The team was founded in 1995, as its football section has produced major international players. KSA plays in the Elite Messieurs, the highest level league in the country.

The club is owned and led by active professional player Kenneth Kadji. The team won its first national championship in 2024, the first title for a Littoral Region-based team in 10 years. They were led by national team players Cédric Tsangue and Étienne Tametong. KSA is currently coached by Auguste Siedjou Nouwou.

KSA played in the Road to BAL qualifiers during the fall of 2024, where they advanced to the Elite 16 but were eliminated by Chaux Sport in the group phase.

== Honours ==
Elite Messieurs

- Champions (1): 2024

Cameroonian Cup

- Runners-up (1): 2024
