= Moanda BB =

Moanda
- League: Gabonese Basketball Cup; Road to BAL
- History: Moanda BB; 2022–present
- Location: Moanda, Gabon
- Head coach: Johd Masnoudji

Monada Basketball, also known as Moanda BB or MDA, is a Gabonese basketball club based in Moanda. Founded in 2022, they play in the Gabonese Basketball Cup and internationally in the Road to BAL. Moanda won its first Gabonese Cup in 2024, after defeating the Mandji Jokers in the finals. They won a second consecutive title in 2025, after defeating the Gladiators in the final. As champions, they played in the Road to BAL round in 2024 and in 2025. In the second year, they advanced to the Elite 16.

== International results ==
Year	Competition	Finish	GP	W	L
2024	Road to BAL	Elite 16	7	2	5
2025	Road to BAL	Elite 16	4	2	2
Total			11	4	7
