= Matero Magic =

- Nickname: Tamanga Boys
- League: Zambia Basketball League; Midland Basketball Superleague
- Founded: 1996
- History: Matero Magic (1996–present)
- Arena: National Sports Development Center
- Capacity: 400
- Location: Lusaka, Zambia
- President: Malindi Chipili
- Vice-president: Sukwana Lukangaba
- Head coach: Obed Shamboko
- Team captain: Chongo Chona
- Championships: 12 Zambian Leagues
Home	Away

The Matero Magic are a Zambian professional basketball club from the Matero neighbourhood of Lusaka. Nicknamed the "Tamanga Boys", the team plays in the Zambia Basketball League and has won the championship a record 12 times. Founded in 1996, the Magic has featured many players who are also part of the Zambia national team, including Chono Chonga.

Home games of the Magic are usually played at the National Sports Development Center. The team has competed in the Road to BAL three times between 2022 and 2025.

== Honours ==
Zambia Basketball League

- Champions (12): 2004, 2013, 2015, 2016, 2020, 2022, 2023–24, 2024–25

== Performance in the Road to BAL ==
The following is the Magic's performance in the Road to BAL, the continental qualifiers organized by FIBA Africa.

Competition	Season	Coach	Won	Lost	Win %	Final stage
Road to BAL	2022	Obed Shamboko	1	4	.200	Eliminated in Elite 16 group stage
Road to BAL	2023	Obed Shamboko	1	5	.000	Eliminated in Elite 16 group stage
Road to BAL	2024	Not qualified				
Road to BAL	2025	Manuel "Gi" Da Silva	5	3	.625	Eliminated in Elite 16 group stage
Road to BAL	2026	Bwalya Musonda	4	4	.500	Eliminated in Elite 16 group stage
Totals			11	16	.407	

== Players ==
=== Current roster ===
Note: Flags indicate national team eligibility at FIBA-sanctioned events. Players may hold other non-FIBA nationalities not displayed.

Matero Magic roster
Players
Coaches

Pos.	No.	Nat.	Name
PG	4	(Zambia)	Kainda, Augustine 'OGI'
SG	5	(Zambia)	Mukelabai, Elijah
F	6	(Zambia)	Mufwaume, Chansa
SF	7	(Zambia)	Mauwe, Germain
G	8	(United States)	Leroy, Jaylen (I)
PG	9	(Zambia)	Ngoma, Spoican
PG	10	(Zambia)	Chona, Chongo (C)
C	11	(Zambia)	Banda, Mike
SG	12	(Zambia)	Lubinda, Simukwela
PG	13	(Zambia)	Ndalama, Miles
C	14	(Zambia)	Kandulu, Douglas
G	15	(Zambia)	Zulu, Bongani

Head coach

- (Zambia) Oberty Shamboko

Assistant coach(es)

- (Zambia) Bwalya David Musonda
- (Zambia) Davis Zulu

Legend

- (C) Team captain
- (I) Import player
- Injured

- Roster
Updated: December 8, 2021

== Head coaches ==
- (Australia) Liz Mills Assistant Coach (2015–2016)
- (Zambia) Obed Shamboko present Head Coach
- (United States) Emmanuel Moses Jean- Player scout
- (Zambia) David Musonda - Assistant Coach
- (Zambia) Davis Zulu - Assistant Coach
- (Zambia) Jeremiah Chenge - Assistant Coach
