= Kenny Kadji =

Cameroonian basketball player

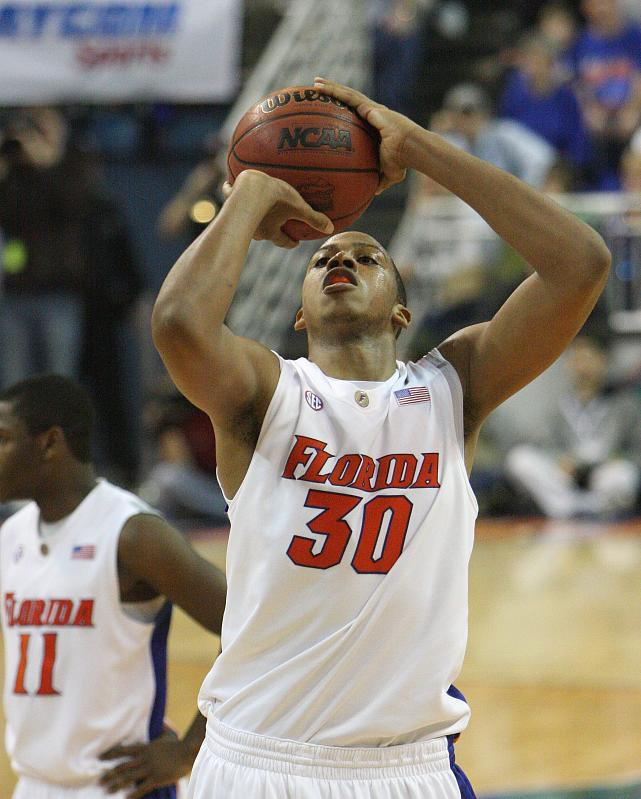
- Kadji in January 2009 with the Florida Gators

Free agent
- Position: Center

Personal information
- Born: May 19, 1988 (age 38) Suresnes, France
- Listed height: 211 cm (6 ft 11 in)
- Listed weight: 110 kg (243 lb)

Career information
- High school: IMG Academy (Bradenton, Florida)
- College: Florida (2008–2010); Miami (Florida) (2011–2013)
- NBA draft: 2013: undrafted
- Playing career: 2013–present

Career history
- 2013–2014: Phantoms Braunschweig
- 2014: Rio Grande Valley Vipers
- 2014–2015: Aries Trikala
- 2015: Dinamo Sassari
- 2015–2016: Enel Brindisi
- 2016: Dinamo Sassari
- 2016: Lietuvos rytas
- 2016–2017: Trabzonspor
- 2017–2019: Tofaş
- 2019–2020: Estudiantes
- 2020: Türk Telekom
- 2020–2021: Frutti Extra Bursaspor
- 2021–2022: BCM Gravelines-Dunkerque
- 2022: Hapoel Holon
- 2023: Limoges CSP
- 2023: Al-Ahli Jeddah
- 2024: Al Sharjah
- 2024: KSA
- 2024–2025: Beirut Club
- 2026: Al-Ahli Manama

Career highlights
- Lega Basket Serie A champion (2015); Italian Cup champion (2015); Second-team All-ACC (2013); Third-team All-ACC (2012)
- Stats at Basketball Reference

Kenneth Kadji (born May 19, 1988) is a Cameroonian professional basketball player who last played for Al-Ahli of the Bahraini Premier League. He played college basketball for the University of Florida and University of Miami.

== High school career ==
Kadji attended IMG Academy in Bradenton, Florida, where in 2008, he was ranked fifth among centers by Rivals.com and sixth by Scout.com.

== College career ==
Kadji initially chose to play at Florida under coach Billy Donovan. He regularly came off the bench in his freshman year of 2008–09, averaging 4.4 points and 2.7 rebounds per game, but his sophomore season was cut short by a back injury that required surgery. After that season, Kadji transferred to Miami, where one of his brothers was attending; he later said that he left Florida "for a fresh start", indicating that he had no problems with Florida's coaches.

After sitting out the 2010–11 season due to NCAA transfer rules, Kadji became a starter at Miami in 2011–12, averaging 11.7 points, 5.3 rebounds, and 1.6 blocks while being named third-team All-ACC. The following season, Kadji averaged 12.9 points and 6.8 rebounds for a Hurricanes team that won the ACC regular-season and tournament titles, and was named second-team All-ACC.

== Professional career ==
=== 2013–14 season ===
After going undrafted in the 2013 NBA draft, Kadji joined the Cleveland Cavaliers for the 2013 NBA Summer League. On September 30, 2013, he signed with the Cavaliers, but was later waived by the team on October 25.

On December 6, 2013, Kadji signed a three-month contract with New Yorker Phantoms Braunschweig of the Basketball Bundesliga. On January 7, 2014, he parted ways with Phantoms after appearing in just five games. On January 25, he was acquired by the Rio Grande Valley Vipers of the NBA Development League. He spent the rest of the 2013–14 season with the Vipers, averaging 6.2 points and 3.5 rebounds in 20 games.

=== 2014–15 season ===
In July 2014, Kadji joined the Milwaukee Bucks for the 2014 NBA Summer League. On August 19, 2014, he signed a one-year deal with Aries Trikala of the Greek Basket League. On February 14, 2015, he left Trikala and signed with Dinamo Sassari of the Italian Serie A for the rest of the season.

=== 2015–16 season ===
On July 11, 2015, Kadji signed with Enel Brindisi, also of the Serie A, for the 2015–16 season. On February 1, 2016, he left Brindisi and returned to his former team Dinamo Sassari for the rest of the season.

=== 2016–17 season ===
On July 23, 2016, Kadji signed with Lithuanian club Lietuvos rytas Vilnius. On October 2, 2016, he parted ways with Lietuvos rytas after three games and signed with Turkish club Trabzonspor for the rest of the season.

=== 2017–18 & 2018–19 season ===
On June 9, 2017, Kadji signed with Turkish club Tofaş for the 2017–18 season.

=== 2019–20 season ===
On September 14, 2019, he has signed with Estudiantes of the Spanish Liga ACB.

On February 29, 2020, he has signed with Türk Telekom of the Turkish Super League.

=== 2020–21 season ===
On August 17, 2020, Kadji signed with Frutti Extra Bursaspor of the Turkish league.

=== 2021–22 season ===
On July 21, 2021, he has signed with BCM Gravelines-Dunkerque of the LNB Pro A.

=== 2022–23 season ===
On July 23, 2022, he has signed with Hapoel Holon of the Israeli Basketball Premier League. On January 30, 2023, he signed with Limoges CSP of the LNB Pro A.

=== 2023–24 season ===
In September 2023, Kadji was signed by Al-Ahli Jeddah of Saudi Arabia.

=== 2024–25 season ===
On September 21, 2024, Kadji signed a 6-month contract with Kadji Sports Academy (KSA) in Cameroon, after having been the owner and president of the club for the past years already.

On November 16, 2024, Kadji signed with the Rain or Shine Elasto Painters of the Philippine Basketball Association (PBA) as the team's import for the 2024–25 PBA Commissioner's Cup. However, he was replaced by Deon Thompson before playing a game for the team.

On December 23, 2024, Kadji signed with the Beirut Club of the Lebanese Basketball League.

=== 2025–26 season ===
On January 20, 2026, Kadji signed with Al-Ahli of the Bahraini Premier League.

== Personal ==
Kadji is the owner and president of the Kadji Sports Academy (KSA) basketball team. In September 2024, he joined the team as a player.
