= Brave Hearts BC =

Bravehearts
- League: Central Zone Basketball League; BASMAL National Championship
- Founded: 2015
- History: Bravehearts Basketball Club (2015–present)
- Arena: ABC Blue Gym
- Location: Lilongwe, Malawi
- Main sponsor: GY Imports and Exports
- President: Griffin Kalua
- Head coach: Griffin Kalua
- Team captain: Madalitso Kadiwa
Home

Brave Hearts Basketball Club, sometimes written as Bravehearts, is a Malawian basketball club based in Lilongwe. The club's colours are green and white. Founded in 2015, they play in the regional Central Zone Basketball League and in the national BASMAL National Championship.

The Bravehearts have played in the Road to BAL tournaments in 2022 and 2025. The home arena of the team is the ABC Blue Gym.

== History ==
The club was founded in 2015 by businessman Griffin Kalua, who owns an import and export company. The Bravehearts' organization features senior men's and women's teams, as well as junior teams. In 2018, club founder Kalua took over as head coach.

The Bravehearts' men's team won the BASMAL National Championship in 2018, 2022, 2023 and 2024.

In the 2025 BAL qualification, Bravehearts qualified for the Elite 16, after finishing second in the group. They were the first-ever Malawian team to advance past the first round. They won a record-extending fifth title in 2025.

== Honours ==
BASMAL National Championship

- Champions (5): 2018, 2022, 2023, 2024, 2025

== Players ==
=== Current roster ===
The following is the Brave Hearts roster for the 2022 BAL Qualifying Tournaments:

Note: Flags indicate national team eligibility at FIBA-sanctioned events. Players may hold other non-FIBA nationalities not displayed.

Bravehearts Basketball Club roster
Players
Coaches

Pos.	No.	Nat.	Name
	1	(Zimbabwe)	Chizah, Henry
	2	(Malawi)	Mwambene, Moses
	4	(Malawi)	Kawanga, Bernard
	5	(Zimbabwe)	Nhira, Tinotenda
	6	(Malawi)	Mafuta, Hydin
	7	(Malawi)	Limbe, Ian Owen
	10	(Malawi)	Kadiwa, Madalitso
	13	(Malawi)	Chirwa, Patrick
	20	(Malawi)	Banda, Austin
G/F	23	(United States)	Vernon, Nate
	33	(Malawi)	Mpakeni, Francis
	34	(Malawi)	Mdulamizu, Peter

Head coach

- (Malawi) Griffin Kalua

Legend

- (C) Team captain
- Injured

- Roster
Updated: October 29, 2021
