= Kenneti Mendes =

Cape Verdean basketball player (born 1990)

No. 10 – Kriol Star
- Position: Center
- League: Basketball Africa League

Personal information
- Born: August 17, 1990 (age 35) Praia, Cape Verde

Career history
- 2016–2017: Sampaense
- 2017–2018: Plasencia
- 2018–2019: Galitos
- 2021: FAP
- 2022: Ferroviário da Beira
- 2024–present: Kriol Star

Kenneti Mendes (born August 17, 1990) is a Cape Verdean professional basketball player who plays for Kriol Star of the Basketball Africa League (BAL). A 6 ft 8 in (2.03 m)-tall center, he has played for the Cape Verde national team, with whom he played at the 2023 FIBA Basketball World Cup.

== Career ==
Born in Praia, the capital of Cape Verde, Mendes has featured for Sampaense in the Liga Portuguesa de Basquetebol in the 2016–17 season, and Galitos in the 2018–19 season.

Mendes played for Mozambican Ferroviário da Beira in the 2023 BAL qualification, and for FAP in the 2022 season. He joined Cape Verdean team Kriol Star for the 2025 BAL qualification, and averaged 11 points and 10.3 rebounds in four games.
