= Joel Almeida (basketball) =

Cape Verdean basketball player

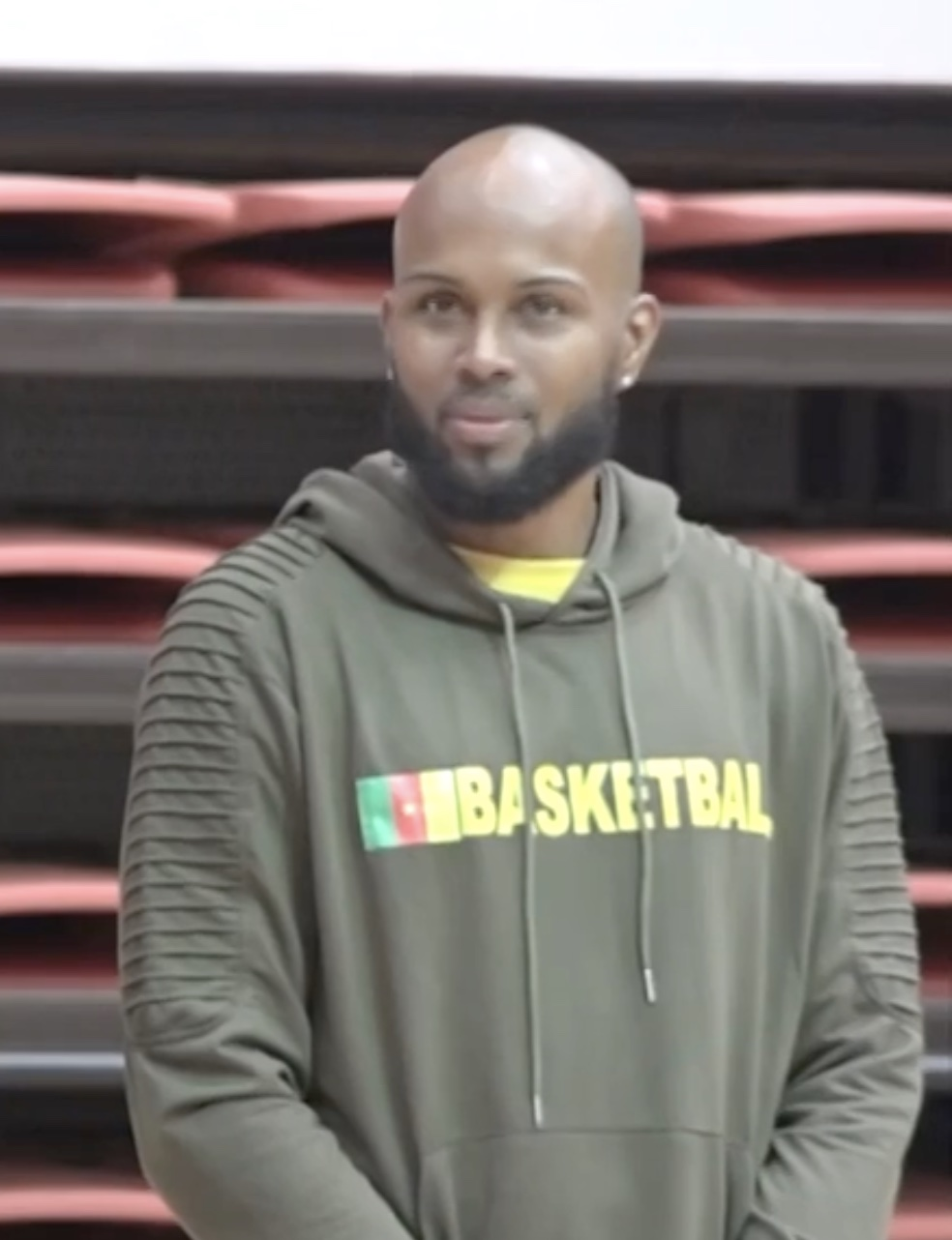
- Almeida with FAP in 2022

No. 9 – Kriol Star
- Position: Shooting guard / small forward
- League: Basketball Africa League

Personal information
- Born: October 11, 1985 (age 41) São Vicente, Cape Verde
- Listed height: 1.94 m (6 ft 4 in)
- Listed weight: 84 kg (185 lb)

Career information
- College: Mohawk Valley CC (2006–2008); Brockport State (2008-2009)
- Playing career: 2006–present

Career history
- 2009: Seven Stars
- 2009–2010: Vagos Norbain Lusavouga
- 2010: Seven Stars
- 2010–2011: Sampaense
- 2011: AD Bairro
- 2011–2012: ASA Luanda
- 2012: AD Bairro
- 2013: Vitória de Guimarães
- 2013–2014: Sampaense
- 2014: Apollon Limassol
- 2015–2016: Xuvem Cambados
- 2016–2017: Covirán Granada
- 2017–2018: Lusitânia
- 2018–2019: Titebi
- 2019–2020: Psychiko
- 2020–2021: Kutaisi
- 2021: FAP
- 2024–present: Kriol Star

Career highlights
- Portuguese Cup winner (2013); 2× Georgian Cup winner (2019, 2021)

Joel Freitas Almeida (born October 11, 1985) is a Cape Verdean basketball player who is currently playing for Kriol Star of the Basketball Africa League (BAL). He also plays for the Cape Verde national basketball team, with whom he played at the 2023 World Cup.

He has played professionally in Portugal, Spain, Cyprus, Angola, Georgia and Cameroon, among others. His brother Ivan also plays professional basketball. Almeida is the co-founder of Cape Verdean professional team Kriol Star, as well as of the Capeverdean Basketball League.

== College career ==
Joel Almeida went to the northeastern United States, where he attended Mohawk Valley Community College between 2006 and 2008 in Utica, New York and played for the NJCAA's Division III, in 2008, he played with Brockport State for one season, a college located west of Rochester which took part in the NCAA's Division III.

In his first season, he played with the Mountain Valley Conference (MVC) and was the second best all-regional team. Almeida was MVP for the team and the Athlete of the Week in February 2007. In his second season, he was elected the All-American 2007 in the preseason of the best team in the Mountain Valley Conference for the second time. He was the Athlete of the Week for the second time in December 2007 with 50 major games played in NJCAA's Division III.

With Brockport State Golden Eagles, he played 14 games and scored an average of 14.7 points and 6.1 rebounds. The team was champion of the SUNYAC Conference with the Golden Eagles.

== Professional career ==
He came back to his native country in 2009 and played for two seasons with Seven Stars who went to the National Basketball Championships, there he was the Best Player of the Year. In-between, he played for Vagos Norbain Lusavouga for the Portuguese Basketball League where he played 23 games and his points average was 8.2 and rebound average was 3.4, his average playing time was 20.8. He was the Best National Players of Week 19 of the LPB (11 points, 9 rebounds, 2 assists in 22 minutes).

He returned to Portugal to play with Sampaense Basket for a season in 2010, he played 18 games, scored an average of 8.9 points (36.7% triple-pointer) and 1.9 rebounds and 16.5 minutes of playing. He was the Top 5 player of the most number of triple pointers. He was the Best Player of Week 13 (33 points, 7 rebounds, 1 assists and 1 steal in 35 minutes). His third return to play in his native country was om 2012 with ADESBA and the club was finalist in the national division.

Almeida later played for Atlético Sport Aviation in Luanda for the Angolan Division I Championships and was one of the first Cape Verdeans to play. Almeida scored 373 points (of which 38.4% were triple-pointers). For his fourth time, he played in his native country and second time with ADESBA.

In March 2013, he played for a Portuguese team again and with Vitória S.C./M.Couto Guimarães late in the season, he made the team won the Portuguese Basketball Cup. He played 10 games with the Guimarães's team with an average of 3.7 points and 2.3 rebounds in 11.7 minutes.

Almeida made his second appearance in Sampaense Basket for the 2013–14 season. He played 22 matches with the Coimbra's team with an average of 16.9 points (52% doubles and 34.8% triples), 4.4 rebounds, 1.1 assists, 1.8 steals and 28.5 minutes of play time. In the number of games played for Sampaense, he was the top ten players of the season.

Almeida played in Cyprus in September 14 and the team ForexTime Apollon Limassol in the country's First Division, a month later, he left. During his career in Cyprus, the team was the finalist in the Cypriot Super Cup.

On January 16, 2015, Almeida moved to play with Xuven Cambados in LEB Plata's Third Division in Spain. He played 15 games with the Galician club and had an average of 11 points (49.2% double points, 34.2% triple pointers), 2.6 rebounds, a steal and 21 minutes of play time. In August 2015, his contract was renewed for another season, he was the best player of the week for the team in weeks 1, 3, 14 and 16.

In December 2021, Almeida joined Cameroonian club FAP to play in the second round of the 2022 BAL qualification.

In 2024, Almeida co-founded the Cape Verdean professional club Kriol Star, along with his brother Ivan. The team played as the country's representative in the 2025 BAL qualification in October 2024. Almeida captained the team in its games. On December 2, 2024, Kriol Star defeated favored Urunani in the semifinal, subsequently qualifying for the main season of the Basketball Africa League (BAL), and becoming the first Cape Verdean team to do so. Almeida averaged 8.2 points and 3.5 rebounds per game in six qualifying games.

== Other activities ==
In March 2023, Almeida founded the semi-professional Capeverdean Basketball League (CBL). He also co-owns the club Kriol Star, together with his brother Ivan.

== Honours ==
Vitória S.C./M.Couto Guimarães

- Portuguese Basketball Cup: 2012–13

Titebi

- Georgian Basketball Cup: 2018–19

Kutaisi 2010

- Georgian Basketball Cup: 2020-21
