= Benin Basketball Super League =

Basketball league in Benin

- Organising body: FBBB
- Founded: 2020
- First season: 2020–21
- Country: Benin
- Confederation: FIBA Africa
- Number of teams: 12
- Level on pyramid: 1
- International cup: Road to BAL
- Current champions: Elan Coton (4th title) (2024–25)
- Most championships: Elan Coton (4 titles)
- Website: Link

The Benin Basketball Super League (French: Super Ligue de Basket-ball du Bénin), for sponsorships known as the YouZou Ligue Pro, is the highest level basketball league in Benin. The competition is organised annually by the Fédération Beninoise de Basket-ball (FBBB).

The champions of each season qualify for the Road to BAL.

== History ==
In 2020 the league became professional as the Benisese government under President Patrice Talon passed a law that required all sports clubs to be operated as companies. The move also allowed foreign players to compete in the league.

Three years later, in May 2023, the league received a substantial subsidy from the Beninese government to further develop the sport in the country. The association received $323,000 (100m CFA franc) which was divided over the league and its nine teams.

For the 2023–24 season, the Super League expanded from 8 to 12 teams, divided in two conferences.

== Current teams ==
As of the 2024–25 season, the Super League consisted out of the following teams:

Conference South

- AOL
- ASPAC
- Avrankou Omnisports
- Energie BBC
- Elan Coton
- Renaissance

Conference North

- ASPAL BBC
- ASPAL Renouveau
- Bosco Star
- Loungou
- Panthères
- US Guema

== Champions ==
| Season | Champions | Runners-up | Finals score | Third place | Ref. |
|---|---|---|---|---|---|
| 2020–21 | ASPAC | ASPAL | | Elan Sportif | |
| 2021–22 | Elan Coton | ASPAL | 64–59 | | |
| 2022–23 | Elan Coton (2) | ASPAC | 77–73 | Renaissance BBC | |
| 2023–24 | Elan Coton (3) | Energie | 64–60 | ASPAL | |
| 2024–25 | Elan Coton (4) | ASPAC | 80–67 | | |
