= BASMAL National Championship =

First division basketball championship in Malawi

- Organising body: BASMAL
- Country: Malawi
- Current champions: Brave Hearts (both men’s and women’s) (2022)

The BASMAL National Championship is the national championship for men's and women's basketball teams in Malawi. It is a tournament that is hosted by the Basketball Association of Malawi (BASMAL), and which is typically held over three days in April. Teams from three other leagues in the country, the Central Zone, Northern Zone and Southern Zone leagues, participate. In 2022, the men's tournament featured eight teams.

Between 2018 and 2021, the competition was not organised in some years due to a lack of funding and sponsorship.

The winners of each season earn the right to represent Malawi in the Road to BAL.

== Current teams ==
=== Men's ===
- Bob Cats
- Bricks
- Crazy Warriors
- Bravehearts
- Central Knights
- Moyale
- Nkhulande

=== Women's ===
- Bravehearts Ladies
- Kukoma Eagles
- Mikoko Mystics
- University of Lilongwe Arkangels
- Kuhes Ganglions

== Men's champions ==
- 2016: Bricks
- 2017-2021: Not organised
- 2018: Bravehearts
- 2022: Bravehearts
- 2023: Bravehearts
- 2024: Bravehearts
- 2025: Bravehearts

=== Finals ===
List of BASMAL National Championship finals (2022-present)
Year	Winners	Score	Runners-up	Venue	MVP
2016	Bricks			African Bible College, Lilongwe	
2018	Bravehearts	85–50	Central Knights	ABC Gym, Lilongwe	
2022	Bravehearts	53–50	Central Knights	Blue Courts Gym, Lilongwe	Manelo Munthali
2025	Bravehearts	66–32	CDH Investment Bank	Kamuzu University of Health Sciences	Faad Billy

== Women's champions ==
- 2016:
- 2017: Bravehearts
- 2018: Brave Hearts
- 2022: Brave Hearts
- 2025: Brave Hearts

=== Finals ===
List of BASMAL National Championship finals (2017-present)
Year	Winners	Score	Runners-up	Venue	MVP
2017	Brave Hearts	75–44	Lady Dynamites	Blue Courts Gym, Lilongwe	–
2018	Brave Hearts	87–32	Cobbe Barracks	Domasi College of Education, Zomba	–
2022	Brave Hearts	59–37	Lilongwe Archangels	Blue Courts Gym, Lilongwe	Mary Chibweke
2025	Brave Hearts	52–37	Unlil ArkAngels	Kamuzu University of Health Sciences	Orleen Londo
