= Spintex Knights =

- Nickname: The Nobles
- League: Greater Accra Basketball League
- Established: 2018
- History: Spintex Knights (2018–present)
- Location: Sakumono, Greater Accra Region, Ghana
- Team colors: Black, Blue and Silver
- President: Eric Opoku-Antwi
- Head coach: Selorm Thomas
- Team captain: Elvis Pobi Asiaw
- Ownership: Eric Opoku-Antwi
- Championships: 1 (2023)

The Spintex Knights are a Ghanaian basketball team based in Sakumono, a town in the Greater Accra Region. The team was established in 2018, and plays in the Accra Basketball League (ABL) Division 1. They are nicknamed "The Nobles".

== History ==
The Knights were founded by Eric Opoku-Antwi and Eli Tetteh Bedzrah in 2018. The team was still a recreational team at the time, however, after four years, the team trained weekly and was in the Accra Basketball League (ABL) Division 2.

In 2020, Selorm Thomas Amediku took over as head coach of the Knights.

The following seasons, they improved drastically, and won their first ABL Division 1 title in 2023, when they finished the season unbeaten with 22 wins in as many games. James Amotoe was named the finals MVP.

The Knights played in the 2025 BAL qualification, and were the first Ghanaian team to advance to the Elite 16.

== Team roster ==
0-Okumoh John Teye

1-James Kofi Amotoe

2-Henry Horlali

3-Godfred Bawa

4-Luak Ruai

5-Elvis Pobi Siaw

6-Treasure Botchway

7-Benjamin Ashtei

8-Samuel Appiah

9-Ollennu Shem

10-Omari Mensah Benjamin

11-Asante Frederick

12-Adom Yao Sedem

14-Oumar Abakar Outman

15-Ollennu Japhet

17-Yakubu Abdul Aziz

20-Baidoo Mensah Kuuku

21-Larbi Emmanuel

23-Habib Hassan

24-Addo Thomas Asare

30-Bassey Effiong

41-Konate

77-Cobblah Desmond

== Honours ==
Accra Basketball League Division 1

- Champions (2): 2023,2024
