= Makhtar Gueye (basketball) =

Senegalese basketball player (born 1997)

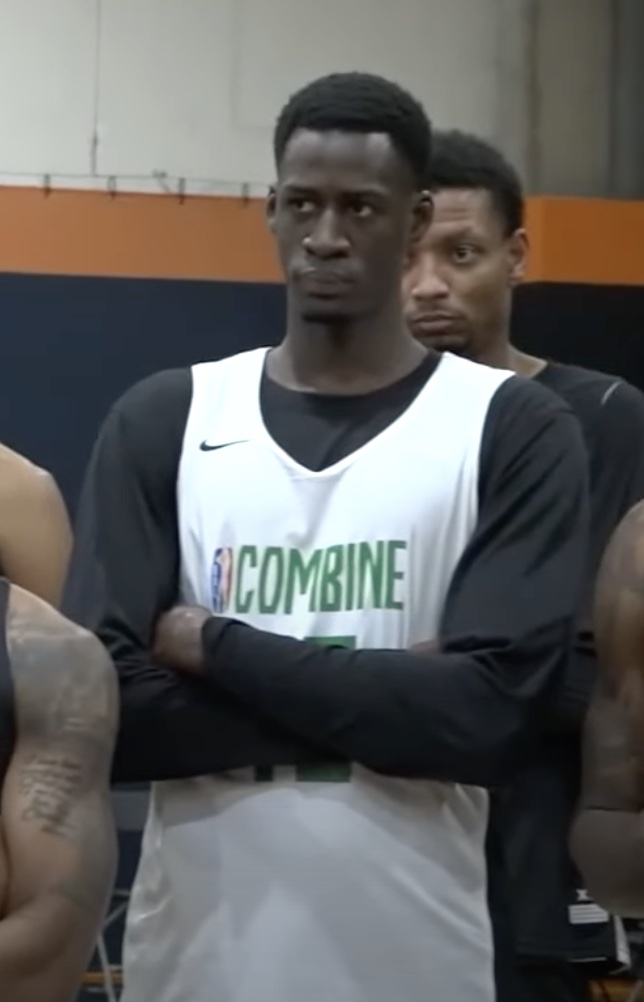
- Gueye at the 2023 Basketball Africa League Combine

ASC Ville de Dakar
- Positions: Center; Forward
- League: Nationale 1 Masculin; Basketball Africa League

Personal information
- Born: January 7, 1997 (age 29) Rufisque, Senegal
- Listed height: 6 ft 10 in (2.08 m)
- Listed weight: 215 lb (98 kg)

Career information
- High school: Lake Forest High School (Lake Forest, Illinois); Aspire Academy (Louisville, Kentucky)
- College: UAB Blazers (2017–2020)
- NBA draft: 2022: undrafted
- Playing career: 2023–present

Career history
- 2021–2022: Menorca
- 2023: Ferroviário da Beira
- 2024: Dynamo
- 2024: KSA
- 2024–present: ASC Ville de Dakar
Medals
Men's basketball
Representing Senegal
AfroBasket
Bronze medal – third place	2025 Angola

Makhtar Gueye (born 7 January 1997) is a Senegalese basketball player. He also plays for ASC Ville de Dakar of the Nationale 1 Masculin and the Basketball Africa League (BAL). Gueye played college basketball for the UAB Blazers for three years.

== Early life ==
Gueye grew up in Dakar, the capital of Senegal and picked up basketball at age 15, at the advice of his mother who was a player. Before that, he played football and was 6 ft 2 in (1.88 m) tall. Gueye then attended SEED Academy and had a growth spurt and then went to play for Lake Forest High School Illinois and later Aspire Academy.

== College career ==
Gueye joined UAB Blazers in 2017 from Aspire academy, in his freshman season he played 32 games averaged 2.2 ponts, 1.59 rebounds and 0.22 assists. He scored eight points in his UAB debut against Jacksonville, and his high score for the season was 9 points in a win over Alabama A&M

In his sophomore year, he played in all 35 games and made 28 starts. He averaged 8.26 ponts, 6.69 rebounds and 0.80 assists.

In his Junior year he played 32 games and made 28 starts, averaging 6.81 ponts, 5.09 rebounds and 0.75 assists.

== Professional career ==
On August 6, 2021, Gueye signed with CB Menorca of the LEB Plata.

Gueye signed his second professional contract with Clube Ferroviário da Beira in February 2023, after participating in the 2023 BAL Combine in Paris in January.

Gueye returned for the 2024 BAL season with Dynamo BBC from Burundi. On 9 March 2024, Gueye scored 13 points in Dynamo's 73–86 opening day win over the Cape Town Tigers. However, Dynamo forfeited its following games as the team refused to wear the league's sponsor logo Visit Rwanda amidst political tensions between Burundi and Rwanda.

In the following qualifying tournament, in November 2024, Gueye represented Kadji Sports Academy from Cameroon.

In December 2024, Gueye joined ASC Ville de Dakar from his native Senegal and the 2025 BAL season.

== National team career ==
Makhtar Gueye represented the Senegal national basketball team at the 2019 FIBA Basketball World Cup in China, where he averaged 4.7 points and 0.7 rebounds per game.
