= Chaux Sport =

- Nickname: Gorillas
- League: Coupe du Congo; EUBABUK
- Founded: 2021
- History: Chaux Sport (2021–present)
- Location: Katana, South Kivu, Democratic Republic of the Congo
- President: Diddy Mudogo
- Head coach: Nicolas Kashama

Chaux Sport is a Congolese basketball team based in Katana and Bukavu, South Kivu. Founded in 2021, the team is nicknamed "Gorillas". They won their first national Coupe du Congo title in 2024. Chaux also play in the EUBABUK, the provincial league of South Kivu. The official slogan of the team is "Shiye njo shiye".

== History ==
The team was created as the basketball section of the already existing football club with the same name, initially starting as a youth academy. The name Chaux Sport literally translates to "Limestone Sport", as the club was founded by the Omela Mudogo, whose family owns a limestone factory in Katana.

The basketball section was established in 2021. Nicolas Kashama became the team's head coach in 2022. The Gorillas reached the semifinals Coupe du Congo in both 2022 and 2023. One year later, in 2024, they won the tournament following a victory over BC Terreur in the final.

They played in the 2025 BAL qualification, where they went undefeated in the first round.

== Honours ==
Coupe du Congo

- Champions (1): 2024

EUBABUK

- Champions (3): 2022, 2023, 2024
