= Nisre Zouzoua =

American-Ivorian basketball player

No. 45 – Dar City
- Position: Shooting guard
- League: Road to BAL

Personal information
- Born: July 16, 1996 (age 30) Brockton, Massachusetts
- Listed height: 6 ft 2 in (1.88 m)
- Listed weight: 195 lb (88 kg)

Career information
- High school: Brockton (Brockton, Massachusetts); Boston Trinity Academy (Boston, Massachusetts)
- College: Bryant (2015–2017); Nevada (2018–2020)
- NBA draft: 2020: undrafted
- Playing career: 2020–present

Career history
- 2020–2021: Dax Gamarde
- 2021–2022: Alliance Sport Alsace
- 2022–2023: Aix Maurienne Savoie
- 2023: SLAC
- 2024: ABC Fighters
- 2024–2025: FUS Rabat
- 2025–present: Dar City

Career highlights
- First-team All-Northeast Conference (2017)

Nisre Mimi Zouzoua (born July 16, 1996) is an American-Ivorian basketball player who plays for Dar City and the Ivory Coast national team. Standing at 6 ft 2 in (1.88 m), he plays as a shooting guard.

== High school career ==
Zouzoua grew up in Brockton, Massachusetts and played three seasons at Brockton High School. He transferred to Boston Trinity Academy and played two seasons. Zouzoua was not highly recruited, rated a one-star prospect, and committed to Bryant.

== College career ==
Zouzoua began his college career for Bryant, scoring 16 points in his debut versus Duke. He averaged 12.8 points per game as a freshman. As a sophomore, he averaged 20.3 points, 4.2 rebounds, 1.5 assists and 1.5 steals per game. Following the season, Zouzoua transferred to Nevada. He played sparingly as a junior, averaging 1.4 points and 1.0 rebounds per game. Zouzoua entered the transfer portal following the season, but ultimately returned to Nevada. In his senior year with Nevada, he averaged 9.8 points coming off the bench and was named Mountain West Conference Sixth Man of the Year.

== Professional career ==
In October 2020, Zouzoua started his professional career with Dax Gamarde in the French NM1, the third level. He averaged 19 points per game in his rookie season.

In October 2023, Zouzoua played for Guinean team SLAC in the Road to BAL. In three games, he averaged a team-leading 21.7 points.

In September 2024, he signed with the ABC Fighters for the Road to BAL 2025.

Zouzoua joined FUS Rabat in the 2024–25 season.

== National team career ==
Zouzoua has represented the Ivory Coast national basketball team, as he is eligible due to his father being Ivorian. He played with the team at FIBA AfroBasket 2021 and contributed 11.2 points and 4.2 rebounds to win the silver medal.

== Personal ==
Nisre's brother Niadré plays college football for Baylor.
