= Gabonese Basketball Cup =

- Organising body: Gabonese Basketball Federation
- Country: Gabon
- Confederation: FIBA Africa
- Number of teams: 10
- International cup: Road to BAL
- Current champions: Moanda (2nd title) (2025)

The Gabonese Basketball Cup (in French: Coupe du Gabon) is the premier basketball tournament for teams in Gabon. The tournament consisted of 10 teams in the 2023 season, and the location is usually rotated between different cities in the country. The participating teams are the winners of the country's regional tournaments. The champions of each season qualify for the Road to BAL.

== Finals ==
Season	Champions	Runners-up	Finals score	Host city	Ref.
2019	Manga	CAS 1987	72–49	Libreville	
2020	Not played				
2021	Not played				
2022	Clash Time	Espoir	53–47	Mouila	
2023	Espoir	Clash Time	69–53	Port-Gentil	
2024	Moanda	Mandji Jokers	66–56	Libreville	
2025	Moanda	Gladiators	57–55	Libreville	

== Most Valuable Player winners ==
MVP Winners
Year	Player	Club	Ref.
2023	Junior Loussi	Espoir	
