= Dar City BC =

Dar City
- League: NBL; BAL
- Founded: 2023
- Location: Dar es Salaam, Tanzania
- Team colours: Red and Black
- President: Mussa Mzenji
- General manager: Simon Joe
- Head coach: Pabi Gueye
- Championships: NBL: 2 (2024, 2025)

Dar City Basketball Club, simply known as Dar City, is a Tanzanian basketball team based in Dar es Salaam. They play in the National Basketball League (NBL), and won their first championship in 2024. They will play in the Basketball Africa League (BAL) in the 2026 season.

== History ==
The team was established in 2023 and immediately lifted the Dar es Salaam Basketball League (DBL) championship. In the following 2024 season, they won their first National Basketball League (NBL) championship.

In December 2024, Dar City made its international debut in the East Africa Basketball Championship Cup. In October 2025, they made their debut in the Road to BAL. They signed the acclaimed Senegalese coach Pabi Guèye to take over the team for the qualifiers. In their first international game they defetaed Djabal Iconi 102–50, while Raphiael Putney set an all-time qualifier record for most points in a game with 55 points.

== Honours ==
=== Domestic ===
National Basketball League

- WInners (2): 2024, 2025

RBA Division 1

- Winners (1): 2022

Dar es Salaam Basketball League

- Winners (2): 2023, 2025

=== International ===
East Africa Basketball Championship Cup

- Runners-up (1): 2024
