= Elan Coton =

- League: Benin Basketball Super League
- Founded: 2021
- History: Elan Coton; 2021–present
- Location: Cotonou, Benin
- Ownership: Sodeco
- Championships: 4 (2022, 2023, 2024, 2025)

Elan Coton Basketball Club is a Beninese basketball club based in Cotonou. They play in the Benin Basketball Super League, the premier national league and have won the championship four times.

The team was previously named Elan Sport Pro, until it became a part of a multi-sports club named Coton Sport that was founded on 21 January 2021 and is owned by Sodeco (Societé pour le Développement du Coton). Coton Sport also features a football club (Coton Sport FC).

In 2022, Elan Coton play in the BAL Qualifying Tournaments as the representative from Benin.

== Honours ==
- Benin Professional League
  - Champions (4): 2021–22, 2022–23, 2023–24, 2024–25

== Notable players ==
Note: Flags indicate national team eligibility at FIBA-sanctioned events. Players may hold other non-FIBA nationalities not displayed.

Criteria

To appear in this section a player must have either:

- Set a club record or won an individual award while at the club
- Played at least one official international match for their national team at any time
- Played at least one official NBA match at any time.

- (United Kingdom) Robert Gilchrist
