= Cameroon Basketball Federation =

Governing body for basketball in Cameroon

- Founded: 1961; 65 years ago
- Affiliation: FIBA
- Regional affiliation: FIBA Africa
- Headquarters: Nkoldongo - Omnisport; Yaoundé, Cameroon
- President: Samuel Tendong Nduku
- Vice president: Anne Marie Safaissou

Official website
- fecabasket.com

Cameroon Basketball Federation (CBF) is a non-profit organization and the governing body for basketball in Cameroon. The organization represents the Cameroon in FIBA and the men's and women's national basketball teams in the Cameroon Olympic Committee.

== History ==
Cameroon Basketball Federation was founded in 1961 as Cameroon National Basketball Federation (CNBF). And remained as the CNBF until 1965 when it joined FIBA.
