= Kriol Star =

- League: CBL; BAL
- Established: 2024
- History: Kriol Star (2024–present)
- Arena: Gimnodesportivo Vavá Duarte
- Capacity: 7,000
- Location: Praia, Cape Verde
- Head coach: Hugo Da Silva Salgado
- Ownership: Kriol Star Foundation

Kriol Star is a Cape Verdean professional basketball team based in Praia. They compete in the Capeverdean Basketball League (CBL) and the Basketball Africa League (BAL), as the first Cape Verdean team in league history, having advanced through the qualifiers.

The home games of the team are usually played at the 7,000-seater arena Gimnodesportivo Vavá Duarte.

== History ==
Although the social organization had been established for around 10 years, the basketball team Kriol Star was established in 2024 by the two professional players and brothers Joel and Ivan Almeida, through the holding Kriol Star Foundation, they played in the Road to BAL 2025, becoming the first club from Cape Verde to play in FIBA's continental qualifying tournaments.

Led by head coach Hugo Da Silva Salgado, they were allocated in Group A. The first roster was revealed in October 2024, and included national team players Ali Lahrichi, Joel Almeida, Dieudonné Ndizeye and Oumar Barry, among others. Kriol Star lost its both games against hosts Al Ahli Tripoli and Stade Malien and was eliminated in the first round. In November, however, FIBA announced that the team received a wild card for the East Division's Elite 16 round. On December 2, they defeated the favored Urunani from Burundi in the semifinal to qualify for the 2025 BAL season.

They began their BAL campaign in April, as they were allocated in the Sahara Conference. On the last game day, they defeated the defending champions Petro de Luanda in overtime, to clinch a playoff berth. As the seventh seed, they were eliminated in the quarterfinals by Al Ahli Tripoli.

In the following 2025–26 season, they were unable to qualify for the BAL again, after going winless in the Elite 16.

== 2025 roster ==
The following was Kriol Star's roster in the 2025 BAL qualification:Note: Flags indicate national team, as has been defined under FIBA eligibility rules. Players may hold more than one non-FIBA nationality.

No.	Pos.	Nat.	Player
0	G	(Morocco) MAR	Ali Lahrichi
2	F	(Cape Verde) CPV	Helton Lopes Correia
8	SG	(Cape Verde) CPV	Joel Almeidfa Tavares
9	G/F	(Cape Verde) CPV	Joel Almeida
11	SF	(Cape Verde) CPV	Luis Texeira
12	G	(United States) USA	Kclejuan Brown
16	C	(Cape Verde) CPV	Keven Gomes
22	G	(United States) USA	De'Angelo Stewart
23	C	(Mali) MLI	Oumar Barry
34	F	(Rwanda) RWA	Dieudonné Ndizeye

== Season by season ==
The following are Kriol Star's results in the BAL:

BAL champions	Conference champions	Playoff berth

Season	League		Regular season				Postseason	Head coach	Captain
Season	League	Conference	Finish	Wins	Losses	Win %	Postseason	Head coach	Captain
Kriol Star
2025	BAL	Sahara	3rd	3	3	.500	Won seeding game (FUS Rabat); Lost quarterfinals (Al Ahli)	Hugo Da Silva Salgado	Joel Almeida
Regular season record				3	3	.500	0 BAL championships		
Playoffs record				1	1	.500	0 BAL championships		

== Notable players ==
Note: Flags indicate national team eligibility at FIBA-sanctioned events. Players may hold other non-FIBA nationalities not displayed.

Criteria

To appear in this section a player must have either:

- Set a club record or won an individual award while at the club
- Played at least one official international match for their national team at any time
- Played at least one official NBA match at any time.

- (Cape Verde) Ivan Almeida
- (Cape Verde) Joel Almeida
- (Cape Verde) Anderson Correia
- (Cape Verde) Kenneti Mendes
