= Libyan Arab Basketball Federation =

Libyan Basketball Federation
- Current season, competition or edition: Libyan Division I Basketball League 2008–09
- Sport: Basketball
- Founded: 1961
- CEO: Omar El Burshushi
- No. of teams: 13 men’s clubs
- Country: Libya
- Most recent champion: Al Ittihad
- Website: Fiba.com

The Libyan Arab Basketball Federation (LBF) is the governing body for men's and women's basketball in Libya. LBF has been an affiliate of FIBA Africa since 1961 and its offices are located in Tripoli. As of 2008 its president is Omar El Burshushi.

== Federation Development ==
=== FIBA Africa Referees Clinic ===
The LBF was a traditional powerhouse in the North African region. The Libyan national team participated in the FIBA Africa Championship games three times, in 1965, 1970, and 1978, where they placed fifth, fifth, and tenth respectively. In past years, the federation was not very active, but recently began initiating a couple of important activities to improve the level of play in Libya and the African continent. FIBA Sports Director Lubomir Kotleba, assisted by Boujemaa Jdaini, President of the Technical Commission of FIBA Africa, visited the country for a FIBA Africa referees clinic. The Clinic was held on March 20–24, 2005 in Tripoli, with participation of 46 Referees and Referee candidates from Algeria, Libya, Mali, Morocco, Sudan and Tunisia. The two FIBA experts used the clinic to explain the latest changes in basketball rules, mechanics of basketball officiating as well as topics like officiating psychology, handling rough game situations and cooperation with players and coaches. The clinic concluded with a written test of basketball rules, a physical fitness test and a practical officiating test for referee candidates. At the closing ceremony, at which representatives of the Ministry for Sport and National Olympic Committee took part, the President of the LBF, Omar T. El Burshushi said "We all around Libyan Basketball are honored to be the host of one of the FIBA Africa Clinic for Referees in 2005. We are working very hard in improving the standard of our basketball. The organization of such clinic will certainly lead us towards better officiating."

=== International Ambitions ===
Abdulrahman N. Saddigh, Secretary General of LBF has big ambitions for hosting international events: "We have now completed in Tripoli two new sports halls which meet international requirements and we are ready to host the top African and even World competitions." In order to enhance the youth programs in the country, LBF hosted an international U21 tournament on April 12, 2005 in Tripoli with the participation of the national teams from Italy, Tunisia, Egypt and Libya. For the Libya national basketball team, the Libyan federation signed Srdjan Antic, a coach from Serbia & Montenegro.

== Libyan Division I Basketball League 2008–09 ==
The 2008–09 season of the Libyan Division I Basketball League began on October 17, 2008. The season features two Divisions: the First Division consists of eight teams - those who finished in the top eight spots from the preceding season; the Second Division consists of five teams - including a new club that entered 2008's competition.

First Division:

- Al-Ittihad
- Al-Ahly Tripoli
- Al Shabab
- Al Nasr
- Al-Ahly Benghazi
- Al Madina
- Al Hilal
- Al-Moroug Al Marj

Second Division:

- Al Jazeera
- Al Yarmook
- Al Tahaddi
- Al Wahda
- Al Amn Al'am
