= 2023–24 Dynamo BBC season =

Burundian basketball club season

Dynamo BBC
2023–24 season
- Head coach: Olivier Ndayiragije (Road to BAL); Julien Chaignot (BAL & VBL))
- Viva Basketball League: Runners-up (lost to Urunani)
- BAL: Disqualified

In the 2023–24 season Dynamo BBC plays internationally in the Basketball Africa League (BAL) and domestically in the Burundian Basketball Championship (Viva Basketball League for sponsorship reasons).

Dynamo debuted as the first Burundian team in BAL history, however, they were disqualified after one game as the result of political reasons.

In the national Viva Basketball League (VBL), Dynamo narrowly lost to rivals Urunani in seven games in the finals.

== Overview ==
Following their national championship in 2023, Dynamo played in the Road to BAL for a second time in club history. Dynamo successfully qualified for the BAL following their campaign in the Road to BAL, becoming the first team from Burundi to do so.

For the BAL season, Dynamo hired Julien Chaignot as head coach. In the opening day game between Dynamo and South Africa's Cape Town Tigers, the Burundian side taped off the logo of league sponsor Visit Rwanda. Political tensions between the two border nations Burundi and Rwanda had been rising, as Burundi has accused Rwanda of supporting the RED-Tabara rebel militia in the country. Dynamo forfeited their second game against FUS Rabat on 10 March, with the BAL citing "refusing to comply with the league’s rules governing jersey and uniform requirements" as the reason why. Following Dynamo's second forfeit on 12 March, the team was automatically withdrawn from the group as per FIBA rules. Dynamo players Bryton Hobbs and Makhtar Gueye stated that the Burundian government had prohibited the team to wear the logo and ordered the club to forfeit its games if necessary.

== Roster ==
The following was Dynamo BBC's roster in the 2024 BAL season.

Dynamo roster
Players
Coaches

Pos.	No.	Nat.	Name	Ht.	Age
PG	0	(Burundi)	Nijimbere, Guibert	1.89 m (6 ft 2 in)	31 – 1 January 1995
PG	1	(United States)	Hobbs, Bryton (C)	1.83 m (6 ft 0 in)	34 – 14 November 1991
SG	2	(South Sudan)	Deng, Dhieu	1.95 m (6 ft 5 in)	24 – 28 August 2001
PF	5	(Burundi)	Bitigirimbango, Derrick	2.00 m (6 ft 7 in)	28 – 19 January 1998
G/F	7	(Senegal)	Gueye, Makhtar	2.08 m (6 ft 10 in)	29 – 7 January 1997
SG	10	(Burundi)	Ndikuriyo, Richard	1.89 m (6 ft 2 in)	29 – 15 May 1997
SG	11	(Burundi)	Alvin, Ninziza	1.86 m (6 ft 1 in)	34 – 8 June 1991
SF	12	(Burundi)	Bujeje, Romis	1.98 m (6 ft 6 in)	27 – 25 November 1998
SF	14	(Senegal)	Camara, Mohamed	2.03 m (6 ft 8 in)	21 – 1 April 2005
PF	24	(Burundi)	Karabona, Clement	2.03 m (6 ft 8 in)	24 – 10 July 2001
C	28	(United Kingdom)	Williams, Morakinyo	2.10 m (6 ft 11 in)	27 – 29 August 1998
C	50	(Nigeria)	Otobo, Israel	2.00 m (6 ft 7 in)	21 – 31 May 2004

Head coach

- (France) Julien Chaignot

Assistant coach(es)

- (Burundi) Olivier Ndayiragije
- (Burundi) Joris Ndumutima

Legend

- (C) Team captain
- Injured

- Roster
Updated: 15 March 2024

== Transactions ==
=== In ===
No.	Pos.	Nat.	Name	Age	Moving from		Type	Ends	Date	Source
1	PG	(United States)	Hameed Ali (Note: Hameed Ali only played in the group phase of the Road to BAL, and was not on the roster for the Elite 16.)	23	Caballeros de Culiacán	(Mexico)	Free agent	1-month		
14	F	(South Sudan)	David Deng	23	Cobra Sport	(South Sudan)	Free agent	2024		
32	C	(Nigeria)	Chris Obekpa	30	ABC Fighters	(Ivory Coast)	Free agent	1-month		
–	F/C	(United Kingdom)	Ryan Richards	32	Yamaguchi Patriots	(Japan)	Free agent	2024		
–	PG	(South Sudan)	Dhieu Deing	22	Pazi	(Tanzania)	Free agent	2024		
–	F	(Senegal)	Makhtar Gueye	26	Ferroviário da Beira	(Mozambique)	Free agent	2024		
–	C	(United Kingdom)	Morakinyo Williams	35	Pukhet Wave	(Thailand)	Free agent	Undisclosed	January 26, 2024	
–	PG	(United States)	Bryton Hobbs	32	Perth Redbacks	(Australia)	Free agent	Undisclosed	January 26, 2024	

== Competitions ==
=== Road to BAL ===
==== First round ====
19 October 2023 1	KPA (Kenya)	63–75	(Burundi) Dynamo	IST Gymnasium, Dar es Salaam
16:00	Scoring by quarter: 13-17, 13-24, 16-28, 21-6
	Pts: Jordan 22; Rebs: Koranga 7 Asts: Adera 3	Report	Pts: Otobo, Revolution 18; Rebs: Otobo 18; Asts: Ali 8	Referees: Tonton Banza Kalume (DRC), Guy Sani Kollo (CMR), Adel Kahallou (ALG)

20 October 2023 2	Dynamo (Burundi)	62–71	(Tanzania) Pazi	IST Gymnasium, Dar es Salaam
19:00	Scoring by quarter: 10-15, 15-20, 18-14, 19-22
	Pts: Deng 20; Rebs: Revolution 15; Asts: Ali 5	Report	Pts: Rucklin 17; Rebs: Deing 14; Asts: Deing 4	Referees: Adlen Larouci (ALG), Tonton Banza Kalume (DRC), Gnoambilé Mockey (CIV)

21 October 2023 3	Dynamo (Burundi)	88–59	(Benin) Elan Coton	IST Gymnasium, Dar es Salaam
16:00	Scoring by quarter: 22-17, 22-18, 18-14, 26-10
	Pts: Otobo 21; Rebs: Otobo 11; Asts: Ali 6	Report	Pts: Mama, Ngaransou 14; Rebs: Ngaransou 12; Asts: Andebi, Sero 3	Referees: Adel Kahallou (ALG), Gnoambilé Mockey (CIV), Shabani Mohamed Shabani (TAN)

==== Elite 16 ====
===== Group stage =====
21 November 2023	Cape Town Tigers (South Africa)	76–61	(Burundi) Dynamo	Ellis Park Arena, Johannesburg
20:00	Scoring by quarter: 17-14, 10-28, 20-8, 29-11
	Pts: Larrier 25; Rebs: Sibanyoni 13; Asts: Larrier 5	Report	Pts: Nijimbere 14; Rebs: Otobo 18; Asts: Morman 4	Referees: Tonton Banza Kalume (DRC), Haytham Ihaqaf (LBY), Diallo Mahamadou (MLI)

22 November 2023	Dynamo (Burundi)	71–76	(Senegal) NBA Academy Africa	Ellis Park Arena, Johannesburg
14:00	Scoring by quarter: 6-22, 23-22, 21-14, 21-18
	Pts: Otobo 22; Rebs: Otobo 10; Asts: Nkanira 3	Report	Pts: Maluach 23; Rebs: Maluach 18; Asts: Chomche 5	Attendance: Haytham Ihaqaf (LBY), Silver Houngbedji (BEN), Erick Otieno (KEN)

23 November 2023	Pazi (Tanzania)	85–88(2OT)	(Burundi) Dynamo	Ellis Park Arena, Johannesburg
20:00	Scoring by quarter: 17-15, 20-13, 9-21, 21-18, Overtime: 10-10, 8-11
	Pts: Deing 32; Rebs: Ndikumana, Thabeet 12; Asts: Gatkuoth 5	Report	Pts: Otobo 20; Rebs: Otobo 18; Asts: Nijimbere 4	Referees: Youssouf Maiga (MLI), Mohamed Elmenshawy (EGY), Erick Otieno (KEN)

===== Final phase =====
25 November 2023 Semifinal	City Oilers (Uganda)	72–61	(Burundi) Dynamo	Ellis Park Arena, Johannesburg
14:00	Scoring by quarter: 19–5, 12–19, 22–22, 19–15
	Pts: Opong 17; Rebs: Miller Jr. 10; Asts: Miller Jr. 6		Pts: Morman 15; Rebs: Obekpa 13; Asts: Ndikuriyo 5	Referees: Arnold Moseya (RSA), Walelign Gebeto (ETH), Francisco Tando (ANG)

26 November 2023 Third place game	COSPN (Madagascar)	78–79	(Burundi) Dynamo	Ellis Park Arena, Johannesburg
17:00	Scoring by quarter: 18–30, 23–17, 21–12, 16–20
	Pts: Randriamampionona 20; Rebs: Rasolomanana 8 Asts: Adewunmi 8	Report	Pts: Deng 17; Rebs: Obekpa 14; Asts: Otobo 5	Referees: Arnold Moseya (RSA), Walelign Gebeto (ETH), Mohamed Elmenshawy (EGY)

=== BAL ===
Pos	Team	Pld	W	L	PF	PA	PD	PCT	Qualification
1	(Morocco) FUS Rabat	4	3	1	363	295	+68	.750	Advance to playoffs
2	(Angola) Petro de Luanda	4	2	2	360	340	+20	.500	Advance to playoffs
3	(South Africa) Cape Town Tigers (H)	4	1	3	305	346	−41	.250	Advance to playoffs
4	(Burundi) Dynamo (D)	0	0	0	0	0	0	—	Withdrew

Source: BAL
Rules for classification: Tiebreakers
(D) Disqualified; (H) Hosts

Does not include the cancelled games.

9 March 2024	Cape Town Tigers (South Africa)	73–86	(Burundi) Dynamo	SunBet Arena, Pretoria
3:00 PM (7:00 PM PST)	Scoring by quarter: 15–21, 14–23, 24–22, 20–20
	Pts: Cele 26; Rebs: Sibanyoni, Preston 7 Asts: Sibanyoni 5	Boxscore	Pts: Otobo 21; Rebs: Otobo 13; Asts: Hobbs 8	Attendance: 5,749; Referees: Kevin Fahy, Wael Ibrahim Mostafa, Monicca Nassuuna
