= 2024 BAL qualification =

2024 BAL qualification (Road to BAL 2024)
- Association: FIBA Africa
- League: Road to BAL
- Sport: Basketball
- Duration: 3 October – 26 November 2023
- Number of teams: 29 registered 22 participated

West Division
- Division champions: (Central African Republic) Bangui Sporting Club
- Top scorer: John Jordan (FUS Rabat)

East Division
- Division champions: (South Africa) Cape Town Tigers
- Top scorer: Dhieu Deing (Pazi)

Seasons
- ← 2023 2025 →

The qualification for the 2024 BAL season, also known as Road to BAL 2024, was the 4th edition of the qualifying tournaments for the Basketball Africa League (BAL). The tournaments were organised by FIBA Africa and are held from 3 October to 26 November 2023. The format was the same as to the previous seasons, with the competition divided in the group phase and the elite 16.

In the West Division, Bangui Sporting Club won the division and became the first team from the Central African Republic to qualify. Runners-up were FUS Rabat and Al Ahly Benghazi finished third, and became the first team from Libya to qualify. In the East Division, the Cape Town Tigers took their second division title, while runners-up City Oilers qualified for a second straight season. Dynamo became the first team from Burundi to qualify.

== Teams ==
The representatives of Guinea, Uganda, Mali, Mozambique, Ivory Coast and South Africa were directly qualified for the Elite 16, as teams from those countries qualified in the 2023 tournaments.

The teams were allocated as follows:

- Group phase: 20 teams
  - National champions from 20 associations
- Elite 16: 7 teams
  - 6 teams from countries that finished 1st-3rd in the 2023 BAL qualification
  - 1 wild card

The final list of teams was announced by FIBA Africa on 21 September 2023. On 30 September 2023, FIBA announced that Nigelec from Niger and Roche-Bois Warriors of Mauritius had pulled out of the tournament. On 5 October, FIBA announced Elan Coton of Benin withdrew, causing the cancellation of Group A with the remaining two teams automatically advancing.

=== Locations ===
Location of teams of the 2024 Road to BAL.
Red: Group A; Brown: Group B; Green: Group C; Blue: Group D; Pink: Group E; Orange: Elite 16 round;

=== West Division ===
Entry stage	Association	Team	Qualification method	Head coach
Elite 16 (2 teams)	Guinea	SLAC	Winner of FGBB-organised qualification tournament	Paolo Povia
Elite 16 (2 teams)	Ivory Coast	ABC Fighters	2023 Ivorian Basketball Championship champions	Milutin Nikolić
Elite 16 (2 teams)	Mali	~~Stade Malien~~ (withdrew)	2022–23 Ligue 1 champions	—
Group phase (7 teams)	Benin	~~Elan Coton~~ (withdrew)	2023 Benin Basketball Super League champions	—
Group phase (7 teams)	Cameroon	FAP	2023 Elite Messieurs champions	Kevin Ngwese
Group phase (7 teams)	Central African Republic	Bangui Sporting Club	2023 Bangui Basketball League champions	Liz Mills
Group phase (7 teams)	Chad	~~Lamantins~~ (forfeited after one game)	2023 Ligue de Basketball de N'Djaména 1st place	—
Group phase (7 teams)	(Democratic Republic of the Congo) DR Congo	Virunga	2023 Coupe du Congo champions	Peter Mulolwa
Group phase (7 teams)	Gabon	Espoir	2023 Gabonese Cup champions	Michael Oganda Igoue
Group phase (7 teams)	Libya	Al Ahly Benghazi	2022–23 Libyan Division I Basketball League champions	Aoun Monaem
Group phase (7 teams)	Morocco	FUS Rabat	2022–23 Division Excellence champions	Said El Bouzidi
Group phase (7 teams)	Niger	~~Nigelec~~ (withdrew)	No national championship organised	—

=== East Division ===
Entry stage	Association	Team	Qualification method	Head coach
Elite 16 (3+1 teams)	Mozambique	Ferroviário da Beira	2023 Liga Moçambicana de Basquetebol champions	Luis Hernandez Lopez
Elite 16 (3+1 teams)	South Africa	Cape Town Tigers	2023 BNL season champions	Florsheim Ngwenya
Elite 16 (3+1 teams)	Uganda	City Oilers	2022 NBL Uganda season champions	Mandy Juruni
Elite 16 (3+1 teams)	None	NBA Academy Africa	Wild card	Alfred Aboya
Group phase (10 teams)	Botswana	Dolphins	2023 Botswana Basketball League champions	Trynos Moyo
Group phase (10 teams)	Burundi	Dynamo	2023 Viva Basketball League champions	Olivier Ndayiragije
Group phase (10 teams)	Comoros	Ushindzi	2022–23 Comoros Basketball Championship champions	Ali Abdoulwahab
Group phase (10 teams)	Ethiopia	~~Sebeta City~~ (withdrew)	2023 Ethiopian Premier League champions	—
Group phase (10 teams)	Kenya	KPA	2023 KBF Premier League champions	Guy Arnaud
Group phase (10 teams)	Tanzania	Pazi	2023 National Basketball League champions	Henry Mwinuka
Group phase (10 teams)	Madagascar	COSPN	2022 N1A champions	Julien Chaignot
Group phase (10 teams)	Malawi	~~Brave Hearts~~ (withdrew)	2023 BASMAL National Championship champions	—
Group phase (10 teams)	Mauritius	~~Roche-Bois Warriors~~ (withdrew)	2023 MBBF Super League champions	—
Group phase (10 teams)	Namibia	UNAM Wolves	2022 Khomas Basketball Association League champions	Titus Mwahafa
Group phase (10 teams)	Seychelles	Beau Vallon Heat	2023 Seychelles Basketball League champions	Augustin Scholastique
Group phase (10 teams)	Zambia	Munali Suns	2022–23 Zambia Basketball League champions	Harry Chansa
Group phase (10 teams)	Zimbabwe	JBC	2023 BUZ National Championship champions	Addison Chiware

Formerly participating associations that did not register a team

- Algeria
- Equatorial Guinea
- Ghana
- South Sudan

== Group phase ==
The venues and schedule for the group phase were confirmed on 21 September 2023. The 20 teams were drawn into five groups, geographically divided into two divisions. The games will begin on 3 October 2023 and end 22 October 2023.

Eleven teams, Al Ahly Benghazi, FUS Rabat, Lamantins, Virunga, Pazi, Sebeta City, UNAM Wolves, Munali Suns, JBC and Ushindzi will make their debut appearances in the Road to BAL competition. Lamantins were the first team from Chad to play in the Road to BAL.

=== West Division ===
==== Group A ====
On 30 September, Nigelec withdrew from the tournament. On 5 October, Elan Coton withdrew as well, which subsequently led to FIBA 's decision to cancel the group's games; the two remaining teams (Al Ahly Benghazi and FUS Rabat) automatically qualified for the Elite 16.

The games of Group A are expected to be played from 6 to 10 October in Benghazi, Libya.

Pos	Team	Pld	W	L	PF	PA	PD	Pts	Qualification
1	(Libya) Al Ahly Benghazi (H)	0	0	0	0	0	0	0	Advance to Elite 16
2	(Morocco) FUS Rabat	0	0	0	0	0	0	0	Advance to Elite 16
3	(Benin) Elan Coton (D)	0	0	0	0	0	0	0	Withdrew
4	(Niger) Nigelec (D)	0	0	0	0	0	0	0	Withdrew

First match(es) will be played: unknown. Source: Road to BAL
(D) Disqualified; (H) Hosts

==== Group B ====
The games of Group B were played from 6 to 10 October in Yaoundé, Cameroon. Lamantins refused to play the second half of their opening match against FAP, and were given a technical loss. Following another forfeited game, they were subsequently disqualified and the team's remaining matches were cancelled and scores were forgotten.

Pos	Team	Pld	W	L	PF	PA	PD	Pts	Qualification
1	(Central African Republic) Bangui Sporting Club	3	2	1	239	199	+40	5	Advance to Elite 16
2	(Cameroon) FAP (H)	3	2	1	256	205	+51	5	Advance to Elite 16
3	(Democratic Republic of the Congo) Virunga	3	1	2	179	223	−44	4	
4	(Gabon) Espoir	3	1	2	205	252	−47	4	
5	(Chad) Lamantins (D)	0	0	0	0	0	0	0	Disqualified

Source: Road to BAL
(D) Disqualified; (H) Hosts

8 October 2023
14:00

Report

Espoir (Gabon)	73–69	(Central African Republic) Bangui Sporting Club
Scoring by quarter: 25-11, 26-16, 10-16, 12-26
Pts: Essono Mvé 21; Rebs: Igouwe 8 Asts: Igouwe 4		Pts: Fula Nganga 18; Rebs: Higgins-Titsha, Kouguère 7 Asts: Johnson 7

Yaoundé Multipurpose Sports Complex, Yaoundé

8 October 2023
17:00

Report

Lamantins (Chad)	0–20	(Cameroon) FAP
Note: Lamantins refused to play the second half after a halftime score of 12-61. The referees gave FAP a technical win.

Yaoundé Multipurpose Sports Complex, Yaoundé

9 October 2023
14:00

Report

Lamantins (Chad)	0–20	(Central African Republic) Bangui Sporting Club

Yaoundé Multipurpose Sports Complex, Yaoundé

9 October 2023
17:00

Report

FAP (Cameroon)	65–61	(Democratic Republic of the Congo) Virunga
Scoring by quarter: 20-8, 12-17, 11-21, 22-15
Pts: Keumoe 15; Rebs: Tametong 9 Asts: Three players 2		Pts: Mwana Mwamba 17; Rebs: Mpoyi Donat 13; Asts: Mampuya Nzuiki 4

Yaoundé Multipurpose Sports Complex, Yaoundé

10 October 2023
17:00

Report

Bangui Sporting Club (Central African Republic)	82–39	(Democratic Republic of the Congo) Virunga
Scoring by quarter: 20-8, 21-13, 14-12, 27-6
Pts: Ganapamo 20; Rebs: Ganapamo, Higgins-Titsha 10; Asts: Johnson 5		Pts: Monze Nzamba 13; Rebs: Bolangi Liseko 11; Asts: Four players 1

Yaoundé Multipurpose Sports Complex, Yaoundé
Referees: Hassane Kamate (CIV), Arnold Moseya (RSA), Emmanuel Kpawogbo (BEN)

11 October 2023
17:00

Report

FAP (Cameroon)	104–56	(Gabon) Espoir
Scoring by quarter: 28-11, 28-20, 21-13, 27-12
Pts: Tametong 20; Rebs: Njiki 10; Asts: Four players 4		Pts: Igouwe 16; Rebs: Moundounga-Moumbeki 6 Asts: Essono Mvé 3

Yaoundé Multipurpose Sports Complex, Yaoundé
Referees: Hassane Kamate (CIV), Amr Zahed (EGY), Said Boukbir (MAR)

12 October 2023
14:00

Report

Virunga (Democratic Republic of the Congo)	79–76	(Gabon) Espoir
Scoring by quarter: 13-16, 15-30, 25-10, 26-20
Pts: Monze Nzamba 23; Rebs: Bolangi Liseko 14; Asts: Monze Nzamba 4		Pts: Igouwe 22; Rebs: Missouma, Moundounga-Moumbeki 9 Asts: Igouwe 7

Yaoundé Multipurpose Sports Complex, Yaoundé
Referees: Hassane Kamate (CIV), Jacques Houngbedji (BEN), Amr Zahed (EGY)

12 October 2023
17:00

Report

Bangui Sporting Club (Central African Republic)	88–87	(Cameroon) FAP
Scoring by quarter: 23-19, 24-26, 11-28, 30-14
Pts: Johnson 20; Rebs: Higgins-Titsha 9 Asts: Djimrabaye 7		Pts: Kome 25; Rebs: Njiki 13; Asts: Three players 4

Yaoundé Multipurpose Sports Complex, Yaoundé
Referees: Arnold Moseya (RSA), Emmanuel Kpawogbo (BEN), Mohamed Yaya Cisse (GUI)

=== East Division ===
==== Group C ====
The games of Group C were initially scheduled for 10–15 October in Dar es Salaam, Tanzania. The games were later moved to 19–21 October. Sebeta City from Ethiopia was drawn into the group, but withdrew later. Elan Coton from Benin, which was originally drawn into Group A, replaced the team.

Pos	Team	Pld	W	L	PF	PA	PD	Pts	Qualification
1	(Tanzania) Pazi (H)	3	3	0	218	194	+24	6	Advance to Elite 16
2	(Burundi) Dynamo (W)	3	2	1	225	193	+32	5	Advance to Elite 16
3	(Kenya) KPA	3	1	2	198	192	+6	4	
4	(Benin) Elan Coton	3	0	3	172	234	−62	3	

Source: Road to BAL
(H) Hosts; (W) Wild card

19 October 2023
16:00

Report

KPA (Kenya)	63–75	(Burundi) Dynamo
Scoring by quarter: 13-17, 13-24, 16-28, 21-6
Pts: Jordan 22; Rebs: Koranga 7 Asts: Adera 3		Pts: Otobo, Revolution 18; Rebs: Otobo 18; Asts: Ali 8

IST Gymnasium, Dar es Salaam
Referees: Tonton Banza Kalume (DRC), Guy Sani Kollo (CMR), Adel Kahallou (ALG)

19 October 2023
19:00

Report

Pazi (Tanzania)	78–65	(Benin) Elan Coton
Scoring by quarter: 23-15, 18-15, 25-16, 12-19
Pts: Deing 24; Rebs: Tsegakele 11; Asts: Rucklin 5		Pts: Sane 15; Rebs: Ngaransou 9 Asts: Kokoun 4

IST Gymnasium, Dar es Salaam
Referees: Amr Aboollo (EGY), Adlen Larouci (ALG), Khaled Ahmed (EGY)

20 October 2023
16:00

Report

Elan Coton (Benin)	48–68	(Kenya) KPA
Scoring by quarter: 14-15, 12-20, 11-13, 11-20
Pts: Ngaransou 12; Rebs: Kokoun, Ngaransou 11; Asts: Sero 4		Pts: Akhuetie 14; Rebs: Akhuetie 9 Asts: Jordan, Wanje 4

IST Gymnasium, Dar es Salaam
Referees: Guy Sani Kollo (CMR), Amr Aboollo (EGY), Shabani Mohamed Shabani (TAN)

20 October 2023
19:00

Report

Dynamo (Burundi)	62–71	(Tanzania) Pazi
Scoring by quarter: 10-15, 15-20, 18-14, 19-22
Pts: Deng 20; Rebs: Revolution 15; Asts: Ali 5		Pts: Rucklin 17; Rebs: Deing 14; Asts: Deing 4

IST Gymnasium, Dar es Salaam
Referees: Adlen Larouci (ALG), Tonton Banza Kalume (DRC), Gnoambilé Mockey (CIV)

21 October 2023
16:00

Report

Dynamo (Burundi)	88–59	(Benin) Elan Coton
Scoring by quarter: 22-17, 22-18, 18-14, 26-10
Pts: Otobo 21; Rebs: Otobo 11; Asts: Ali 6		Pts: Mama, Ngaransou 14; Rebs: Ngaransou 12; Asts: Andebi, Sero 3

IST Gymnasium, Dar es Salaam
Referees: Adel Kahallou (ALG), Gnoambilé Mockey (CIV), Shabani Mohamed Shabani (TAN)

21 October 2023
19:00

Report

Pazi (Tanzania)	69–67	(Kenya) KPA
Scoring by quarter: 17-18, 16-14, 24-14, 12-21
Pts: Deing 24; Rebs: Thabeet 15; Asts: Thabeet 2		Pts: Jordan 21; Rebs: Haidara, Lundy 6 Asts: Adera, Akhuetie 3

IST Gymnasium, Dar es Salaam
Referees: Tonton Banza Kalume (DRC), Amr Aboollo (EGY), Guy Sani Kollo (CMR)

==== Group D ====
The games of Group D were initially scheduled for 17–22 October in Gaborone, Botswana, but were eventually moved to 21–23 October. Bravehearts from Malawi were also drawn in the group but withdrew before the start of the tournament.

Pos	Team	Pld	W	L	PF	PA	PD	Pts	Qualification
1	(Zimbabwe) JBC	3	2	1	222	173	+49	5 (Note: Head-to-head point difference: 1) JBC +34; 2) Dolphins +1; 3) Munali Suns -35)	Advance to Elite 16
2	(Botswana) Dolphins (H)	3	2	1	204	171	+33	5	
3	(Zambia) Munali Suns	3	2	1	195	202	−7	5	
4	(Namibia) UNAM Wolves	3	0	3	152	227	−75	3	

Source: Road to BAL
(H) Hosts
Notes:

21 October 2023
17:30

Report

UNAM Wolves (Namibia)	54–82	(Zambia) Munali Suns
Scoring by quarter: 15-21, 8-21, 15-25, 16-15

UB Indoor Arena, Gaborone
Referees: Walelign Gebeto (ETH), Dorothy Okatch (BOT), Didier Gaga (RWA)

21 October 2023
20:30

Report

Dolphins (Botswana)	68–65	(Zimbabwe) JBC
Scoring by quarter: 17-16, 11-23, 24-12, 16-14
Pts: Ndyara 15; Rebs: Gaborone 9 Asts: Ndyara 4		Pts: Chiimba 21; Rebs: Penduka 7 Asts: Changara 3

UB Indoor Arena, Gaborone
Referees: N/A

22 October 2023
17:30

Report

JBC (Zimbabwe)	77–55	UNAM Wolves (Namibia)
Scoring by quarter: 21-11, 13-20, 15-10, 21-14
Pts: Zhomwa 19; Rebs: Byers 13; Asts: Pfachi		Pts: Mukumbutaa 15; Rebs: Mutakalilumo 12; Asts: Kauami, Tjirimuje 2

UB Indoor Arena, Gaborone
Referees: Sara Elsharnouby (EGY), David Domingos Manuel (ANG), Antonio Sitoe (MOZ)

22 October 2023
20:30

Report

Munali Suns (Zambia)	63–61	(Botswana) Dolphins
Scoring by quarter: 22-13, 13-13, 23-17, 5-19
Pts: H. Banda 19; Rebs: H. Banda 17; Asts: Kashishi, Musonda 2		Pts: Collins 17; Rebs: Ndawanyana, Ramabu 9 Asts: Three players 3

UB Indoor Arena, Gaborone
Referees: Erick Otieno (KEN), Didier Gaga (RWA), Jerome Oliver Denis (MRI)

23 October 2023
17:30

Report

Munali Suns (Zambia)	50–87	(Zimbabwe) JBC
Scoring by quarter: 10-22, 9-20, 13-23, 18-22
Pts: Hollins 10; Rebs: H. Banda 18; Asts: Mweetwa 2		Pts: Chiimba 17; Rebs: Byers 11; Asts: Pfachi 5

UB Indoor Arena, Gaborone
Referees: Erick Otieno (KEN), Walelign Gebeto (ETH), Didier Gaga (RWA)

23 October 2023
20:30

Report

Dolphins (Botswana)	75–43	(Namibia) UNAM Wolves
Scoring by quarter: 13-9, 16-19, 32-8, 14-7
Pts: Gaborone 18; Rebs: Felesian 17; Asts: Ramabu 6		Pts: Nghixulifwa 13; Rebs: Three players 7 Asts: Mukumbutaa 3

UB Indoor Arena, Gaborone
Referees: Sara Elsharnouby (EGY), Jerome Olivier Denis (MRI), Antonio Sitoe (MOZ)

==== Group E ====
The games of Group E are expected to be played from 3 to 7 October in Antananarivo, Madagascar.

Pos	Team	Pld	W	L	PF	PA	PD	Pts	Qualification
1	(Madagascar) COSPN (H)	2	2	0	163	109	+54	4	Advance to Elite 16
2	(Seychelles) Beau Vallon Heat	2	1	1	139	136	+3	3	
3	(Comoros) Ushindzi	2	0	2	112	169	−57	2	
4	(Mauritius) Roche-Bois Warriors (D)	0	0	0	0	0	0	0	Withdrew

Source: Road to BAL
(D) Disqualified; (H) Hosts

6 October 2023
17:00

Report

Beau Vallon Heat (Seychelles)	82–60	(Comoros) Ushindzi
Scoring by quarter: 17-15, 20-15, 21-16, 24-14
Pts: Oliseh 27; Rebs: Oliseh 19; Asts: Andre 4		Pts: Bendafi 14; Rebs: Salim 8 Asts: Abduyllatuf 4

Palais des Sports Mahamasina, Antananarivo
Referees: Walelign Gebeto (ETH), Nilton Macamo (MOZ), Haja Ranaivoson (MAD)

7 October 2023
17:00

Report

Ushindzi (Comoros)	52–87	(Madagascar) COSPN
Scoring by quarter: 6-20, 10-23, 13-26, 23-18
Boxscore not published by FIBA.
Pts: Omar 13		Pts: Coulter 21

Palais des Sports Mahamasina, Antananarivo
Referees: Claudio Eiuba (ANG), Walelign Gebeto (ETH), Ahmed Khedr (EGY)

8 October 2023
17:00

Report

COSPN (Madagascar)	76–56	(Seychelles) Beau Vallon Heat
Scoring by quarter: 16-9, 21-14, 20-11, 19-23
Pts: Coulter, Ratianarivo 21; Rebs: Ratianarivo 11; Asts: Ratianarivo 4		Pts: Oliseh 20; Rebs: Oliseh 13; Asts: Mutyambizi 4

Palais des Sports Mahamasina, Antananarivo
Referees: Walelign Gebeto (ETH), Ahmed Khedr (EGY), Claudio Eiuba (ANG)

== Elite 16 ==
The Elite 16 is composed of sixteen teams that are geographically divided into Group E and Group F. The teams that finish in the top three places of their division qualify for the 2024 BAL season.

The West Division was initially supposed to be held in Abidjan, Ivory Coast, for a second consecutive season. However, on 12 October, FIBA Africa announced the Yaoundé Multipurpose Sports Complex in Yaoundé was the new host of the games, because the venue in Abidjan was unavailable. The East Division will be hosted in Johannesburg, South Africa, for the third season in a row.

The draw was held on 23 October 2023 in Gaborone. Teams that played in the same group in the first phase could not be drawn in the same group for the Elite 16.

=== West Division ===
==== Group A ====
Pos	Team	Pld	W	L	GF	GA	GD	Pts	Qualification
1	(Libya) Al Ahly Benghazi	2	2	0	170	150	+20	4	Advance to semi-finals
2	(Cameroon) FAP	2	1	1	161	149	+12	3	Advance to semi-finals
3	(Democratic Republic of the Congo) Virunga	2	0	2	136	168	−32	2	

Source: FIBA

31 October 2023
20:00

Report

FAP (Cameroon)	84–63	(Democratic Republic of the Congo) Virunga
Scoring by quarter: 25-13, 18-7, 21-21, 20-22
Pts: Friday 16; Rebs: Njiki 11; Asts: Tsangue 4		Pts: Monze Nzamba 12; Rebs: Lukadi 12; Asts: Denis 3

Yaoundé Multipurpose Sports Complex, Yaoundé
Referees: Hassane Kamate (CIV), Adlen Larouci (ALG), Emmanuel Kpawogbo (BEN)

1 November 2023
20:00

Report

Al Ahly Benghazi (Libya)	86–77	(Cameroon) FAP
Scoring by quarter: 21-18, 24-16, 20-23, 21-20
Pts: Lofton 25; Rebs: Majok 11; Asts: Diabate 9		Pts: Kome 22; Rebs: Doucoure 10; Asts: Tametong 4

Yaoundé Multipurpose Sports Complex, Yaoundé
Referees: Claudio Eiuba (ANG), Didier Gaga (RWA), Zouhir Bouhabba (MAR)

2 November 2023
20:00

Report

Virunga (Democratic Republic of the Congo)	73–84	(Libya) Al Ahly Benghazi
Scoring by quarter: 22-14, 15-19, 17-29, 19-22
Pts: Three players 11; Rebs: Betoudji 9 Asts: Ngoy 5		Pts: Lofton 32; Rebs: Majok 11; Asts: Crawford 5

Yaoundé Multipurpose Sports Complex, Yaoundé
Referees: Hassane Kamate (CIV), Walelign Gebeto (ETH), Oumar Sy (MRI)

==== Group B ====
Pos	Team	Pld	W	L	GF	GA	GD	Pts	Qualification
1	(Morocco) FUS Rabat	3	2	1	240	238	+2	5	Advance to semi-finals
2	(Central African Republic) Bangui Sporting Club	3	2	1	260	239	+21	5	Advance to semi-finals
3	(Ivory Coast) ABC Fighters	3	1	2	244	237	+7	4	
4	(Guinea) SLAC	3	1	2	222	252	−30	4	

Source: FIBA

31 October 2023
14:00

Report

ABC Fighters (Ivory Coast)	76–84	(Morocco) FUS Rabat
Scoring by quarter: 8-19, 25-22, 17-20, 26-23
Pts: Akano 19; Rebs: Edosomwan 10; Asts: Kra 4		Pts: Jordan 18; Rebs: Diarra 5 Asts: Jordan, Zouita 4

Yaoundé Multipurpose Sports Complex, Yaoundé
Referees: Walelign Gebeto (ETH), Didier Gaga (RWA), Ahmed Khedr (EGY)

31 October 2023
17:00

Bangui Sporting Club (Central African Republic)	88–79	(Guinea) SLAC
Scoring by quarter: 29-20, 17-21, 17-22, 25-16
Pts: Ganapamo 25; Rebs: Djimrabaye 11; Asts: Johnson 11		Pts: Hearst 23; Rebs: Gilbert 12; Asts: Hearst 7

Yaoundé Multipurpose Sports Complex, Yaoundé
Referees: Sara Elsharnouby (EGY), Claudio Eiuba (ANG), Oumar Sy (MRI)

1 November 2023
14:00

Report

SLAC (Guinea)	70–98	(Ivory Coast) ABC Fighters
Scoring by quarter: 22-21, 14-21, 17-33, 17-23
Pts: Zouzoua 20; Rebs: Doumbouya 6 Asts: Hearst 2		Pts: Akano 20; Rebs: Edosomwan 9 Asts: Akano 3

Yaoundé Multipurpose Sports Complex, Yaoundé
Referees: Sara Elsharnouby (EGY), Adlen Larouci (ALG), Roger Djeugoue Bossok (CMR)

1 November 2023
17:00

Report

FUS Rabat (Morocco)	90–89 (OT)	(Central African Republic) Bangui Sporting Club
Scoring by quarter: 17-23, 21-19, 22-26, 22-14, Overtime: 8-7
Pts: Jordan 28; Rebs: Diarra 9 Asts: Jordan 6		Pts: Ganapamo 20; Rebs: Djimrabaye 11; Asts: Johnson 8

Yaoundé Multipurpose Sports Complex, Yaoundé
Referees: Walelign Gebeto (ETH), Emmanuel Kpawogbo (BEN), Papa Felix Seye (SEN)

2 November 2023
14:00

FUS Rabat (Morocco)	66–73	(Guinea) SLAC
Scoring by quarter: 19-15, 14-17, 16-22, 17-19
Pts: Baeri, Jordan 10; Rebs: Three players 5 Asts: Baeri, Nouhi 3		Pts: Zouzoua 24; Rebs: Nguirane 14; Asts: Gilbert 5

Yaoundé Multipurpose Sports Complex, Yaoundé
Referees: Didier Gaga (RWA), Ahmed Khedr (EGY), Didier Shema Nshuti (RWA)

2 November 2023
20:00

Report

Bangui Sporting Club (Central African Republic)	83–70	(Ivory Coast) ABC Fighters
Scoring by quarter: 24-19, 23-14, 10-20, 26-17
Pts: Kamayengue 24; Rebs: Kouguere 9 Asts: Three players 3		Pts: Edosomwan 15; Rebs: Edosomwan 14; Asts: Westbrook 3

Yaoundé Multipurpose Sports Complex, Yaoundé
Referees: Sara Elsharnouby (EGY), Claudio Eiuba (ANG), Adlen Larouci (ALG)

==== Final stage ====
===== Semi-finals =====
4 November 2023
17:00

Report

Al Ahly Benghazi (Libya)	85–87	(Central African Republic) Bangui Sporting Club
Scoring by quarter: 23-14, 29-32, 22-21, 11-20
Pts: Hamad 20; Rebs: Majok 12; Asts: Crawford 6		Pts: Ganapamo 22; Rebs: Kouguère 9 Asts: Johnson 5

POPSI, Yaoundé
Referees: Walelign Gebeto (ETH), Didier Gaga (RWA), Adlen Larouci (ALG)

4 November 2023
20:00

Report

FUS Rabat (Morocco)	78–60	(Cameroon) FAP
Scoring by quarter: 21-21, 22-14, 21-16, 14-9
Pts: Diarra 18; Rebs: Diarra 21; Asts: El Haoua 6		Pts: Tametong 18; Rebs: Njiki 8 Asts: Keumoe 3

POPSI, Yaoundé
Referees: Hassane Kamate (CIV), Sara Elsharnouby (EGY), Claudio Eiuba (ANG)

==== Third place game ====
5 November 2023
20:00

Report

Al Ahly Benghazi (Libya)	93–84	(Cameroon) FAP
Scoring by quarter: 21-17, 27-16, 28-13, 17-28
Pts: Crawford 39; Rebs: Majok 8 Asts: Diabate 12		Pts: Tametong 26; Rebs: Friday 11; Asts: Keumoe 6

POPSI, Yaoundé
Referees: Sara Elsharnouby (EGY), Walelign Gebeto (ETH), Adlen Larouci (ALG)

==== Final ====
5 November 2023
17:00

Report

Bangui Sporting Club (Central African Republic)	92–90	(Morocco) FUS Rabat
Scoring by quarter: 21-20, 27-23, 21-24, 24-23
Pts: Kamayengue 17; Rebs: Djimrabaye 10; Asts: Johnson 7		Pts: Jordan 17; Rebs: Azouga 8 Asts: Jordan 8

POPSI, Yaoundé
Referees: Hassane Kamate (CIV), Claudio Eiuba (ANG), Emmanuel Kpawogbo (BEN)

=== East Division ===
All indicated times are in GMT+2.

==== Group phase ====
===== Group A =====
Pos	Team	Pld	W	L	GF	GA	GD	Pts	Qualification
1	(South Africa) Cape Town Tigers	3	3	0	240	209	+31	6	Advance to semi-finals
2	NBA Academy Africa (I)	3	2	1	221	197	+24	5	
3	(Burundi) Dynamo	3	1	2	220	237	−17	4	Advance to semi-finals
4	(Tanzania) Pazi	3	0	3	229	267	−38	3	

Source: FIBA
(I) Ineligible to advance

21 November 2023
14:00

Report

NBA Academy Africa	84–57	(Tanzania) Pazi
Scoring by quarter: 23-18, 20-17, 22-8, 19-14
Pts: Diop, Maluach 19; Rebs: Chomche 15; Asts: Three players 4		Pts: Gatkuoth 16; Rebs: Ndikumana 12; Asts: Four players 1

Ellis Park Arena, Johannesburg
Attendance: Youssouf Maiga (MLI), Mohamed Elmenshawy (EGY), Silver Houngbedji (BEN)

21 November 2023
20:00

Report

Cape Town Tigers (South Africa)	76–61	(Burundi) Dynamo
Scoring by quarter: 17-14, 10-28, 20-8, 29-11
Pts: Larrier 25; Rebs: Sibanyoni 13; Asts: Larrier 5		Pts: Nijimbere 14; Rebs: Otobo 18; Asts: Morman 4

Ellis Park Arena, Johannesburg
Referees: Tonton Banza Kalume (DRC), Haytham Ihaqaf (LBY), Diallo Mahamadou (MLI)

22 November 2023
14:00

Report

Dynamo (Burundi)	71–76	NBA Academy Africa
Scoring by quarter: 6-22, 23-22, 21-14, 21-18
Pts: Otobo 22; Rebs: Otobo 10; Asts: Nkanira 3		Pts: Maluach 23; Rebs: Maluach 18; Asts: Chomche 5

Ellis Park Arena, Johannesburg
Attendance: Haytham Ihaqaf (LBY), Silver Houngbedji (BEN), Erick Otieno (KEN)

22 November 2023
20:00

Report

Pazi (Tanzania)	87–95	(South Africa) Cape Town Tigers
Scoring by quarter: 25-11, 22-19, 13-31, 21-14

Ellis Park Arena, Johannesburg
Referees: Mbaye Seye (SEN), Wael Mostafa (EGY), Francisco Tando (ANG)

23 November 2023
14:00

Report

Cape Town Tigers (South Africa)	69–61	NBA Academy Africa
Scoring by quarter: 13-16, 15-14, 19-20, 22-11

Ellis Park Arena, Johannesburg
Referees: Claudio Eiuba (ANG), Diallo Mahamadou (MLI), Francisco Tando (ANG)

23 November 2023
20:00

Report

Pazi (Tanzania)	85–88 (2OT)	(Burundi) Dynamo
Scoring by quarter: 17-15, 20-13, 9-21, 21-18, Overtime: 10-10, 8-11
Pts: Deing 32; Rebs: Ndikumana, Thabeet 12; Asts: Gatkuoth 5		Pts: Otobo 20; Rebs: Otobo 18; Asts: Nijimbere 4

Ellis Park Arena, Johannesburg
Referees: Youssouf Maiga (MLI), Mohamed Elmenshawy (EGY), Erick Otieno (KEN)

===== Group B =====
Pos	Team	Pld	W	L	GF	GA	GD	Pts	Qualification
1	(Uganda) City Oilers	3	3	0	265	233	+32	6	Advance to semi-finals
2	(Madagascar) COSPN	3	2	1	242	211	+31	5	Advance to semi-finals
3	(Mozambique) Ferroviário da Beira	3	1	2	218	243	−25	4	
4	(Zimbabwe) JBC	3	0	3	199	237	−38	3	

Source: FIBA

21 November 2023
11:00

Report

Ferroviário da Beira (Mozambique)	75–55	(Zimbabwe) JBC
Scoring by quarter: 18–17, 18–7, 18–9, 21–22
Pts: Mendes 12; Rebs: Kennedy 12; Asts: Kennedy, Nurmamade 2		Pts: Wek 12; Rebs: Chiimba, Wek 8 Asts: Chidzomba

Ellis Park Arena, Johannesburg
Referees: Wael Mostafa (EGY), Diallo Mahamadou (MLI), Erick Otieno (KEN)

21 November 2023
17:00

Report

City Oilers (Uganda)	81–76	(Madagascar) COSPN
Scoring by quarter: 18–20, 11–21, 29–16, 23–19
Pts: Miller Jr. 26; Rebs: Miller Jr. 9 Asts: Miller Jr., Petty 5		Pts: Coulter 16; Rebs: Coulter 12; Asts: Adewunmi, Ratianarivo 4

Referees: Arnold Moseya (RSA), Walelign Gebeto (ETH), Francisco Tando (ANG)

22 November 2023
11:00

Report

JBC (Zimbabwe)	71–84	(Uganda) City Oilers
Scoring by quarter: 22–20, 23–25, 17–20, 9–19
Pts: Phiri, Tela 16; Rebs: Wek 13; Asts: Pfachi 4		Pts: Petty 29; Rebs: Odeke 13; Asts: Miller Jr. 3

Ellis Park Arena, Johannesburg
Referees: Walelign Gebeto (ETH), Tonton Banza Kalume (DRC)

22 November 2023
17:00

Report

COSPN (Madagascar)	88–57	(Mozambique) Ferroviário da Beira
Scoring by quarter: 22–15, 28–14, 9–18, 29–10
Pts: Randriamampionona 26; Rebs: Coulter 11; Asts: Randriamampionona 4		Pts: Perry, Kennedy 13; Rebs: Kennedy 9 Asts: Nurmamade 2

Ellis Park Arena, Johannesburg
Referees: Wael Mostafa (EGY), Arnold Moseya (RSA), Haytham Ihaqaf (LBY)

23 November 2023
11:00

Report

COSPN (Madagascar)	78–73	(Zimbabwe) JBC
Scoring by quarter: 24–24, 17–18, 20–13, 17–18
Pts: Randriamampionona 26; Rebs: Coulter 11; Asts: Randriamampionona 4		Pts: Perry, Kennedy 13; Rebs: Kennedy 9 Asts: Nurmamade 2

Ellis Park Arena, Johannesburg
Referees: Wael Mostafa (EGY), Arnold Moseya (RSA), Haytham Ihaqaf (LBY)

23 November 2023
17:00

Report

Ferroviário da Beira (Mozambique)	88–100	(Uganda) City Oilers
Scoring by quarter: 19–17, 20–24, 22–27, 25–32
Pts: Nurmamade 23; Rebs: Ubisse 8 Asts: Kennedy 6		Pts: Roebuck Jr. 20; Rebs: Roebuck Jr. 11; Asts: Miller Jr. 9

Ellis Park Arena, Johannesburg
Referees: Tonton Banza Kalume (DRC), Mbaye Seye (SEN), Walelign Gebeto (ETH)

==== Final phase ====
===== Semi-finals =====
25 November 2023
19:00

Report

Cape Town Tigers (South Africa)	67–63	(Madagascar) COSPN
Scoring by quarter: 14–13, 22–12, 18–19, 13–19

Ellis Park Arena, Johannesburg
Referees: Wael Mostafa (EGY), Youssouf Maiga (MLI), Haytham Ihaqaf (LBY)

25 November 2023
14:00

City Oilers (Uganda)	72–61	(Burundi) Dynamo
Scoring by quarter: 19–5, 12–19, 22–22, 19–15
Pts: Opong 17; Rebs: Miller Jr. 10; Asts: Miller Jr. 6		Pts: Morman 15; Rebs: Obekpa 13; Asts: Ndikuriyo 5

Referees: Arnold Moseya (RSA), Walelign Gebeto (ETH), Francisco Tando (ANG)

===== Third place game =====
26 November 2023
17:00

Report

COSPN (Madagascar)	78–79	(Burundi) Dynamo
Scoring by quarter: 18–30, 23–17, 21–12, 16–20
Pts: Randriamampionona 20; Rebs: Rasolomanana 8 Asts: Adewunmi 8		Pts: Deng 17; Rebs: Obekpa 14; Asts: Otobo 5

Ellis Park Arena, Johannesburg
Referees: Arnold Moseya (RSA), Walelign Gebeto (ETH), Mohamed Elmenshawy (EGY)

===== Final =====
26 November 2023
14:00

Report

Cape Town Tigers (South Africa)	70–68	(Uganda) City Oilers
Scoring by quarter: 22–22, 14–15, 24–15, 20–16

Ellis Park Arena, Johannesburg
Referees: Diallo Mahamadou (MLI), Tonton Banza Kalume (DRC), Erick Otieno (KEN)

== Statistics ==
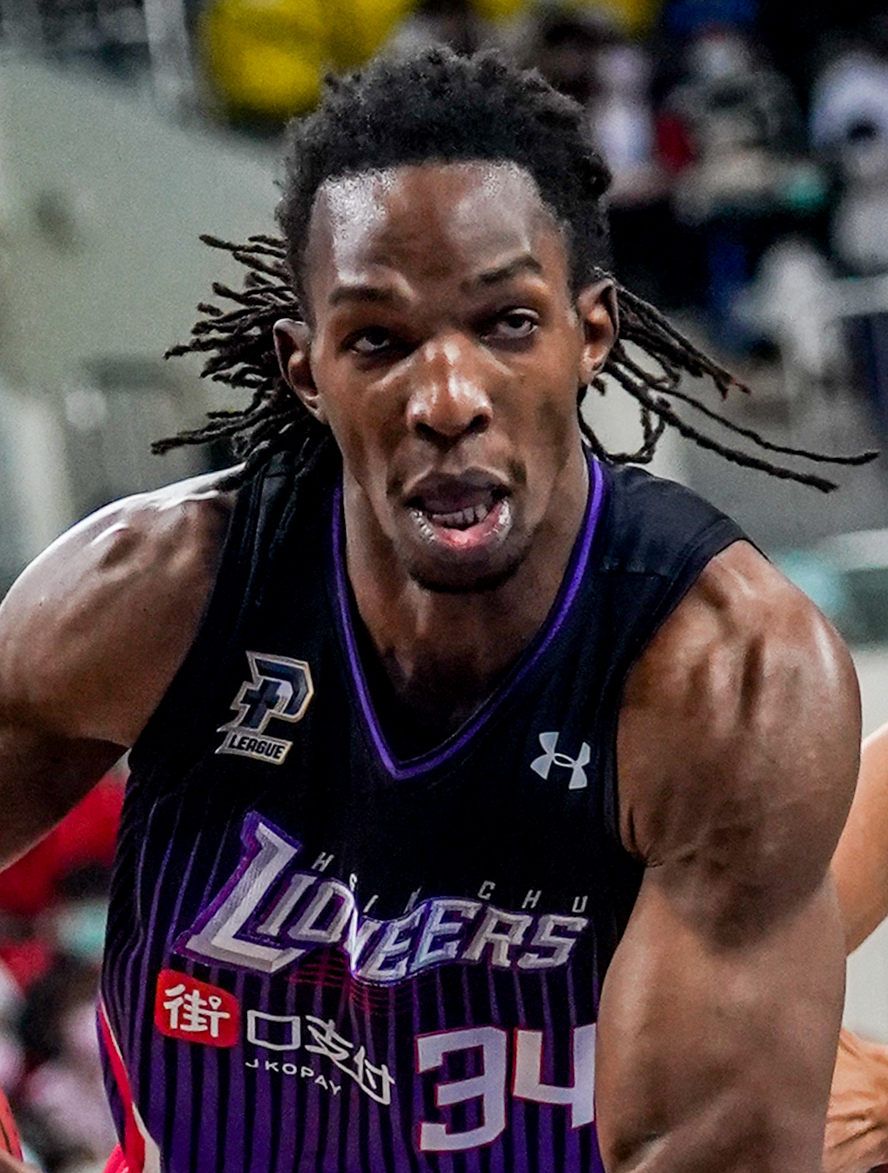
Hasheem Thabeet averaged the most blocks per game

Note: Per the FIBA website, some boxscores of games are missing and have not been included in the averages.

=== Individual statistic leaders ===
Category	Player	Team(s)	Statistic	Played
Efficiency per game	Aliou Diarra	FUS Rabat	20.0	4
Points per game	Dhieu Deing	Pazi	22.2	5
Rebounds per game	Israel Otobo	Dynamo	13.1	8
Assists per game	Solo Diabate	Al Ahly Benghazi	6.8	4
Steals per game	Perry Petty	City Oilers	4.0	4
Blocks per game	Hasheem Thabeet	Pazi	2.8	4
Turnovers per game	Noah Penduka	JBC	4.5	4
Minutes per game	Dhieu Deing	Pazi	39.3	5
FG%	Aliou Diarra	FUS Rabat	71.9%	4
3P%	Jalone Friday	FAP	62.5%	4
FT%	Dhieu Deing	Pazi	88.9%	5
Double-doubles	Israel Otobo	Dynamo	4	8

=== Individual game highs ===
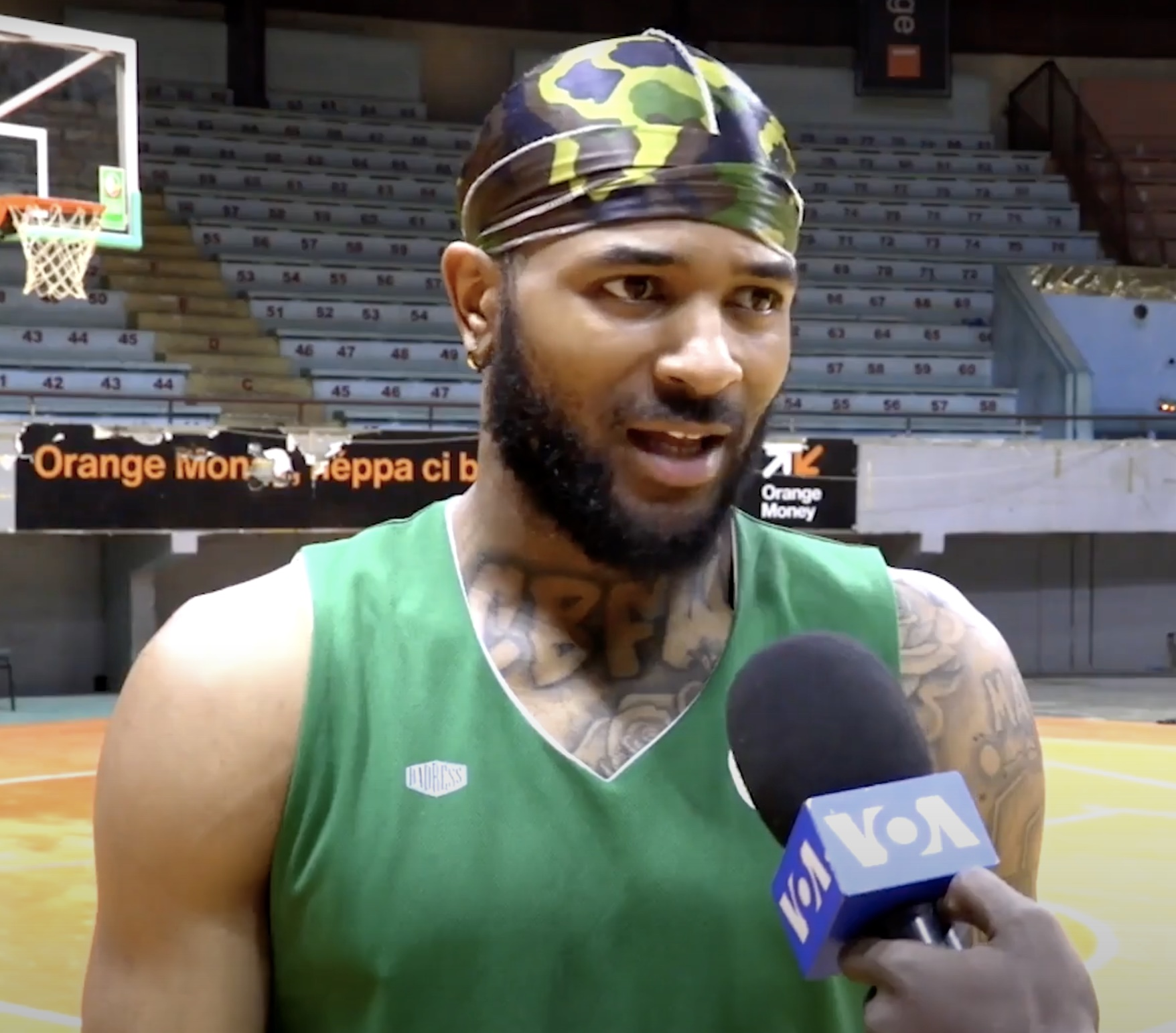
Chris Crawford scored 39 points on 5 November in the third place game, the most of any player in the tournament

Category	Player	Team	Statistic
Efficiency	Aliou Diarra	FUS Rabat	37
Points	Chris Crawford	Al Ahly Benghazi	39
Rebounds	Aliou Diarra	FUS Rabat	21
Assists	Solo Diabate	Al Ahly Benghazi	12
Steals	Solo Diabate	Al Ahly Benghazi	6
Steals	Perry Petty (2x)	City Oilers	6
Blocks	Frank Betoudji	Virunga	9
