= Ellis Park =

Ellis Park may refer to:

- Ellis Park, Adelaide Park Lands in South Australia
- Ellis Park Arena (formerly Standard Bank Arena), an indoor stadium in Johannesburg, South Africa
- Ellis Park Stadium, also known as Emirates Airline Park, a stadium in Johannesburg, South Africa
- Ellis Park Race Course, a thoroughbred horse race track in Henderson, Kentucky
