= Heroes' Cup (Burundi) =

Heroes Cup
- Organising body: FEBABU; Fondation Pax-Burundi
- Founded: 2017
- First season: 2017
- Country: Burundi
- Current champions: Dynamo (4th title) (2023)
- Most championships: Dynamo (4 titles)

The Heroes Cup (in French: La Coupe des Héros) is an annual basketball competition for men's teams in Burundi. It is held to celebrate the Independence of Burundi and to commemorate its national heroes. It was established in 2017, and is organised by the non-profit organization Fondation Pax-Burundi and the FEBABU. Teams from the Burundian Basketball Championship participate, as well as teams from the B Division.

== Winners ==
Edition	Season	Champions	Runners-up	Score	MVP	Ref.
1	2017	Dynamo	Muzinga	53–48	–	
2	2018	Dynamo (2)	Urunani	71–34	–	
3	2019	Urunani	Gymkana	60–55	–	
4	2020	Dynamo (3)	Muzinga Ngozi	72–62	Amani Rushoza	
5	2021	Urunani (2)	Dynamo		–	
6	2022	Urunani (3)	Dynamo	82–81	–	
7	2023	Dynamo (4)	Urunani	52–45	–	
