= NBA Academy Africa =

- League: Road to BAL
- Founded: 2017
- History: NBA Academy Africa; 2017–2026
- Location: Saly, Senegal
- Head coach: Alfred Aboya

The NBA Academy Africa was a basketball team and academy operated by the National Basketball Association (NBA), located in Saly, Senegal. Opened in 2017, the academy offered both education and basketball training. Several alumni of the program have played in professional leagues. The academy was a shared program between the NBA and SEED Academy. The academy had two indoor training courts, as well as dormitories and educational facilities.

Starting in 2022, the academy had a program called BAL Elevate with the Basketball Africa League (BAL), that allowed each BAL team to select an academy player to feature on its roster during the season. A year earlier, in 2021, Mohab Yasser became the first academy player to play in the BAL and also the first player to win the league championship.

For the following 2023 season, the NBA Academy enrolled its own team in the Road to BAL qualifiers where they played against professional teams. Despite being ineligible to qualify for the BAL, they finished with a successful 2–1 record, after beating Burundian champions Urunani and Kenyan champions KPA. In the 2025 NBA draft, alumni Khaman Maluach was drafted 10th overall by the Houston Rockets (later being traded to the Phoenix Suns), becoming the highest drafted player from the academy.

In October 2026, the NBA closed the NBA Academy Africa.

== Players ==
=== 2022 roster ===
In November 2022, the NBA Academy Africa fielded the following roster playing in the 2023 BAL qualification.

NBA Academy Africa roster
Players
Coaches

Pos.	No.	Nat.	Name
G		(Senegal)	Mboup, Khadim
G		(Central African Republic)	Darlan, Thierry Serge
F/C		(Chad)	Tahir, Mahamat
C		(South Sudan)	Maluach, Khaman
PF		(Nigeria)	Chinyelu, Rueben
C		(Nigeria)	Okorafor, Emmanuel
F		(Cameroon)	Chomche, Ulrich
G/F		(France)	Camara, Dramane
G		(Angola)	Neto, Aginaldo
PF		(Egypt)	Hendawy, Seifeldin
F		(Gabon)	Akoue, Daniel

Head coach

- (Cameroon) Alfred Aboya

Legend

- (C) Team captain
- Injured

- Roster
Updated: 29 October 2022

=== Drafted into the NBA ===
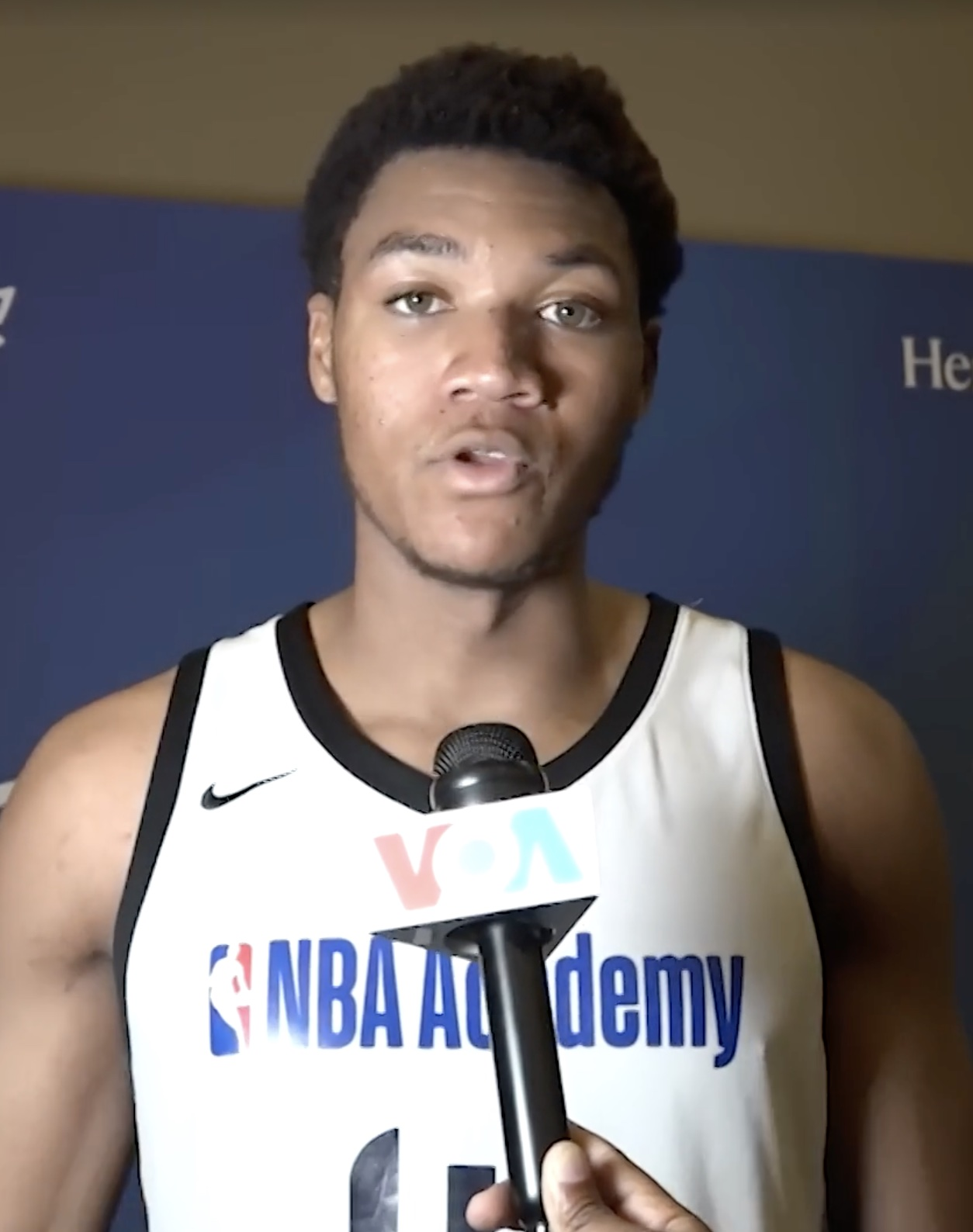
Ulrich Chomche was the first academy player to be drafted into the NBA during the 2024 NBA draft

Former NBA Academy Africa players selected in the NBA draft
Year	Round	Pick	Player	Nationality	Draft team
2024	2	57th	Ulrich Chomche	Cameroon	Memphis Grizzlies (from Oklahoma City to Atlanta to Houston, traded to Toronto via Minnesota)
2025	1	10th	Khaman Maluach	South Sudan	Houston Rockets (traded to the Phoenix Suns)

=== Notable alumni ===
- (Senegal) Ibou Badji (2018) – center who played for the Portland Trail Blazers, currently plays in Spain
- (Senegal) Jean Jacques Boissy (2019) – guard who plays in Libya
- Kurt-Curry Wegscheider (2019) – guard who plays in the Central African Republic
- Mohab Yasser (2020) – guard who plays in Egypt
- (Senegal) Babacar Sané (2022) – forward who plays in Tunisia
- (Nigeria) Ugonna Onyenso (2022) – center for the Detroit Pistons.
- (Central African Republic) Thierry Serge Darlan (2022) – guard for the Santa Clara Broncos
- (Guinea) Mohamed Keita (2022 - transferred) – center for the Temple Owls
- (Nigeria) Rueben Chinyelu (2023) – center for the Florida Gators
- Victor Ezeh (2023) – guard who played in Nigeria
- (Cameroon) Ulrich Chomche (2024) – center for the Toronto Raptors
- (South Sudan) Khaman Maluach (2024) – center for the Phoenix Suns

== Competitive games in the Road to BAL ==
The NBA Academy Africa faced off against several national champions in the Road to BAL, the official qualifying tournament for the Basketball Africa League, in 2022 and 2023. They entered in the Elite 16 round, and as a wild card, were not eligible to advance to the semi-finals or to qualify for the main league season.

=== 2022 ===
22 November 2022	Cape Town Tigers (South Africa)	85–60	NBA Academy Africa	Ellis Park Arena, Johannesburg
		Boxscore

23 November 2022	NBA Academy Africa	79–69	(Burundi) Urunani	Ellis Park Arena, Johannesburg
		Boxscore

24 November 2022	KPA (Kenya)	69–84	NBA Academy Africa	Ellis Park Arena, Johannesburg
		Boxscore

=== 2023 ===
21 November 2023	NBA Academy Africa	84–57	(Tanzania) Pazi	Ellis Park Arena, Johannesburg
		Boxscore

22 November 2023	Dynamo (Burundi)	71–76	NBA Academy Africa	Ellis Park Arena, Johannesburg
		Boxscore

23 November 2023	Cape Town Tigers (South Africa)	69–61	NBA Academy Africa	Ellis Park Arena, Johannesburg
		Boxscore
