= Dhieu Deing =

American-South Sudanese basketball player (born 2001)

No. 6 – Johannesburg Giants
- Position: Shooting guard
- League: BAL

Personal information
- Born: 28 August 2001 (age 25)
- Listed height: 6 ft 5 in (1.96 m)
- Listed weight: 175 kg (386 lb)

Career information
- High school: High Point Central (High Point, North Carolina)
- College: USC Aiken (2019–2020); Dodge City CC (2020–2021); UTSA (2021–2022)
- Playing career: 2022–present

Career history
- 2022–2023: Cape Town Tigers
- 2023: Pazi
- 2024: Dynamo
- 2024: Cape Town Tigers
- 2025–present: Johannesburg Giants

Career highlights
- South African Championship champion (2022)

Dhieu Abwok Deing (born 28 August 2001) is an American-South Sudanese basketball player for the Johannesburg Giants of the Basketball Africa League (BAL). He played college basketball for the USC Aiken Pacers, Dodge City CC Conquistadors, and UTSA Roadrunners.

== High school and college career ==
Deing attended High Point Central High School and was a three-time all-conference selection, as well as a two-time all-state and all-district honoree.

In his freshmen year with the USC Aiken, Deing averaged 11.6 points and 4.3 rebounds per game. Deing majored in communication. He transferred to Dodge City Community College, where he averaged 19.1 points and 4.7 rebounds in his sophomore year. Following the season, he transferred to UTSA, where he averaged 13.6 points and 5.3 rebounds per game in his junior season. Deing later declared for the 2022 NBA draft and decided to forego his remaining college eligibility.

== Professional career ==
In August 2022, Deing joined the Cape Town Tigers and helped them win the South African national championship.

In September 2023, Deing joined the Tanzanian club Pazi for the 2024 BAL qualification tournaments. He made his debut on 19 October 2023, scoring a team-high 24 points in Pazi's win over Elan Coton. Despite Pazi being unable to qualify, Deing led the Road to BAL in scoring with 22.2 points per game.

In January 2024, Deing joined Burundian team Dynamo for the 2024 BAL season. On 9 March 2024, Deing made his BAL debut with 18 points, 6 rebounds and 3 assists in Dynamo's 73–86 win over the Cape Town Tigers. However, Dynamo forfeited its following games as the team refused to wear the league's sponsor logo Visit Rwanda amidst political tensions between Burundi and Rwanda.

In May 2024, he joined his former team, the Cape Town Tigers, for the 2024 BAL playoffs.

From October 2025, Deing played with the Johannesburg Giants in the Road to BAL, and averaged 19.8 points per game, helping the team qualify.

== National team career ==
Deing was on the South Sudan men's national basketball team for AfroBasket 2021. He contributed 11.2 points per game, helping the team reach the quarterfinals of the tournament.

== Career statistics ==
Legend
GP	Games played	GS	Games started	MPG	Minutes per game
FG%	Field goal percentage	3P%	3-point field goal percentage	FT%	Free throw percentage
RPG	Rebounds per game	APG	Assists per game	SPG	Steals per game
BPG	Blocks per game	PPG	Points per game	**Bold**	Career high

=== College ===
==== NCAA Division I ====
Year	Team	GP	GS	MPG	FG%	3P%	FT%	RPG	APG	SPG	BPG	PPG
2021–22	UTSA	25	13	27.2	.407	.299	.754	5.3	1.5	1.3	.2	13.6

==== NCAA Division II ====
Year	Team	GP	GS	MPG	FG%	3P%	FT%	RPG	APG	SPG	BPG	PPG
2019–20	USC Aiken	29	15	28.4	.423	.342	.794	4.3	1.1	.8	.7	11.6

==== JUCO ====
Year	Team	GP	GS	MPG	FG%	3P%	FT%	RPG	APG	SPG	BPG	PPG
2020–21	Dodge City CC	22	21	32.8	.391	.338	.753	4.7	2.2	1.9	.2	19.1
