= Hameed Ali (basketball) =

American basketball player (born 1993)

Free agent
- Position: Point guard

Personal information
- Born: August 26, 1993 (age 32) Hayward, California
- Listed height: 6 ft 2 in (1.88 m)
- Listed weight: 180 lb (82 kg)

Career information
- High school: San Leandro High School (San Leandro, California)
- College: Texas A&M-Corpus (2011–2015)
- NBA draft: 2015: undrafted
- Playing career: 2016–present

Career history
- 2016–2017: Bristol Flyers
- 2017–2018: Garra Cañera de Navolato
- 2018: Olimpi Tbilisi
- 2018: Panteras de Aguascalientes
- 2018: Brujos de Guayama
- 2020: Panteras de Aguascalientes
- 2021: Al Sadd
- 2022: DUC
- 2022: Caballeros de Culiacán
- 2023: Dynamo
- 2024: Silicon Valley Panthers

Career highlights
- BAL assists leader (2022); All-Southland Third Team (2016); Southland All-Tournament Team (2016); Southland All-Defensive Team (2016)

Hameed Tariq Ali (born August 26, 1993) is an American professional basketball player. He played college basketball for Texas A&M–Corpus Christi before turning professional in 2016.

== Professional career ==
On August 8, 2016, Ali signed with Bristol Flyers of the British Basketball League.

In March 2022, Ali played for the Senegalese DUC in the Basketball Africa League. On March 15, he set a new league record for most assists in a game when he had 15 assists versus AS Salé.

In July 2022, Ali joined the Venezuelan Brilliantes del Zulia of the Superliga Profesional de Baloncesto (SPB).

In October 2023, Ali joined Burundian side Dynamo for the first round of the 2024 BAL qualification tournaments.

== BAL career statistics ==
Legend
GP	Games played	GS	Games started	MPG	Minutes per game
FG%	Field goal percentage	3P%	3-point field goal percentage	FT%	Free throw percentage
RPG	Rebounds per game	APG	Assists per game	SPG	Steals per game
BPG	Blocks per game	PPG	Points per game	**Bold**	Career high
*	Led the league

Year	Team	GP	GS	MPG	FG%	3P%	FT%	RPG	APG	SPG	BPG	PPG
2022	DUC	5	5	29.9	.406	.310	.857	4.0	8.4*	1.8	0.2	15.4
