= David Deng =

South Sudanese basketball player (born 2000)

Chaux Sport
- Position: Power forward / small forward
- League: Road to BAL

Personal information
- Born: 25 June 2000 (age 26) Arua, Uganda
- Listed height: 2.04 m (6 ft 8 in)

Career information
- Playing career: 2019–present

Career history
- 2019–2021: UCU Canons
- 2021: Nam Blazers
- 2021–2022: Cobra Sport
- 2023–2024: Dynamo
- 2024–present: Chaux Sport

David Deng Kongor Deng (born 25 June 2000), also known as Dikong, is a South Sudanese basketball player, who plays for Chaux Sport. Standing at 2.04 m (6 ft 8 1/2 in), he plays as power forward.

== Early life ==
Deng was born in the Ugandan city of Arua, to South Sudanese parents. He studied at Arua Public Primary School and St. Joseph College, Ombaci. He later played for the junior teams Giant Stomers and Destiny Phenoms.

== Club career ==
In 2019, Deng joined the UCU Canons of the NBL Uganda. He guided his team to the NBL Finals, where the team lost to City Oilers. He transferred to the Nam Blazers in the offseason. The following season, he was third in scoring in the 2021 season with 16.6 points per game.

In 2021, he joined South Sudanese team Cobra Sport to play in the 2022 BAL qualification. Over five games, he averaged 15.6 points and 6.6 rebounds, helping his team qualify for its first-ever BAL appearance.

Deng joined the Burundian club Dynamo BBC in the 2024 BAL qualification. On 26 November 2023, Dynamo made history by becoming the first team from Burundi to qualify for the BAL. Deng averaged 28 minutes, 11.4 points, 5.4 rebounds, 1.6 assists per game in his eight appearances in the Road to BAL.

In October 2024, Deng joined the Congolese champions Chaux Sport for the 2025 BAL qualification.

== National team career ==
On October 10, 2021, Deng was selected to play for the Uganda national basketball team in the qualifiers for FIBA AfroBasket 2021. He pulled out on October 22, citing his ambitions to represent South Sudan in international competitions.

== Career statistics ==
=== BAL ===
Legend
GP	Games played	GS	Games started	MPG	Minutes per game
FG%	Field goal percentage	3P%	3-point field goal percentage	FT%	Free throw percentage
RPG	Rebounds per game	APG	Assists per game	SPG	Steals per game
BPG	Blocks per game	PPG	Points per game	**Bold**	Career high

Year	Team	GP	GS	MPG	FG%	3P%	FT%	RPG	APG	SPG	BPG	PPG
2022	Cobra	4	2	17.9	.333	.316	.778	2.5	.8	1.3	.0	7.8
Career		4	2	17.9	.333	.316	.778	2.5	.8	1.3	.0	7.8
