= Cypress Christian School =

Location
- 21455 Bridgeland Creek Parkway; Cypress, Texas 77433; United States; 29.9516°N 95.5868°W N, W

Information
- Type: Private Christian
- Motto: III John 4
- Established: 1978
- Head of school: Dr. Jeffrey Potts
- Grades: K–12
- Enrollment: approx 835
- Colors: Navy & White
- Mascot: Warrior
- High School Principal: Dr. Antonio Morales
- Middle School Principal: Mrs. Iva Nell Rhea
- Elementary Principal: Mrs. Danielle Williams
- Website: www.cypresschristian.org

Cypress Christian School (CCS), formerly Cypress Community Christian School, is a private, non-profit, K-12 Christian school located in unincorporated northwest Harris County, Texas, near Cypress and Houston.

The school was founded in 1978. As of April 2024, it has 824 students. 322 are in elementary school (K-5), 211 are in middle school (6–8), and 291 are in high school (9–12). In 2021 and 2022, the school won the TAPPS 4A Henderson Cup, naming Cypress Christian School the top 4A private school in Texas.

== Academics ==
Cypress Christian School is accredited by the Association of Christian School International (ACSI) and Cognia (formerly AdvancED). ACSI is an accreditation agency approved by the Texas Private School Accreditation Commission (TEPSAC).

== Athletics ==
Cypress Christian School offers football, volleyball, cross country, cheerleading, boys & girls soccer, boys & girls basketball, swimming, baseball, softball and boys & girls track & field in middle school and high school. Golf and dance are also available in high school. Elementary students may participate in boys & girls soccer, boys & girls basketball, baseball and softball.

== Student life ==
Cypress Christian School has multiple student clubs and activities, including:

- Warrior Leadership Academy
- National Junior Honor Society
- National Honor Society
- National Art Honor Society
- Fellowship of Christian Athletes (FCA)
- Ambassador Council
- Academic Team
- Yearbook Team

== Notable alumni ==
- Hasheem Thabeet
