= Munali Suns =

- League: Zambia Basketball League; Midlands Basketball Association
- Founded: 2004
- History: Munali Suns; 2004–present
- Location: Lusaka, Zambia
- Chairman: Conard Musonda
- Head coach: Harry Chansa

The Munali Suns are a Zambian basketball team based in Munali, a suburb of Lusaka. Founded in 2014, they play in the Zambia Basketball League and won their first championship in the 2022–23 season following their victory over the Matero Magic. As national champions, the Suns were the third Zambian team to play in the Road to BAL in the 2023 tournaments.

== Honours ==
Zambia Basketball League

- Champions (1): 2022–23

Midlands Basketball Association

- Champions (1): 2022

== Players ==
=== Current roster ===
The Munali Suns fielded the following roster in the 2024 BAL qualification, which was held in October 2023.

Note: Flags indicate national team eligibility at FIBA-sanctioned events. Players may hold other non-FIBA nationalities not displayed.

Munali Suns roster
Players
Coaches

Pos.	No.	Nat.	Name	Ht.	Age
SF	1	(United States)	Hollins Jr., Alfred	1.98 m (6 ft 6 in)	27 – 14 January 1999
PG	2	(Zambia)	Mweetwa, Jared	1.83 m (6 ft 0 in)	27 – 13 January 1999
SG	3	(United States)	Thomas, Joshua	1.93 m (6 ft 4 in)	28 – 17 October 1997
PF	4	(Zambia)	Banda, Harrison	2.01 m (6 ft 7 in)	29 – 1 March 1997
PG	5	(Zambia)	Musongo, Chipo	1.85 m (6 ft 1 in)	25 – 11 April 2001
SG	6	(Zambia)	Musonda, Ndama	1.98 m (6 ft 6 in)	21 – 16 March 2005
SG	9	(Zambia)	Mutepuka, Tatenda	2.01 m (6 ft 7 in)	23 – 23 January 2003
PG	10	(Zambia)	Chishala, Musonda	1.93 m (6 ft 4 in)	33 – 15 April 1993
SF	11	(Zambia)	Siazilo, Jason	1.93 m (6 ft 4 in)	33 – 10 January 1993
SF	12	(Zambia)	Kashishi, Paul	1.87 m (6 ft 2 in)	33 – 29 May 1993
C	14	(Zambia)	Banda, Mike	2.08 m (6 ft 10 in)	29 – 11 February 1997
C	15	(Zambia)	Mapani, Titus	1.98 m (6 ft 6 in)	33 – 25 July 1992

Head coach

- (Zambia) Harry Chansa

Assistant coach(es)

- (Zambia) Sani Mbuzi

Legend

- (C) Team captain
- Injured

- Roster
Updated: 22 October 2023

== Head coaches ==
- Martin "Sekuru" Muchena (-2023)
- Harry Chansa (2023-present)
