= BC Virunga =

Virunga
- League: Congolese Cup; Road to BAL
- Arena: Bismack Biyombo Indoor Hall
- Location: Goma, North Kivu, Democratic Republic of the Congo
- Head coach: Kipere Mulolwa

Basketball Club Virunga, also known as simply Virunga, is a Congolese basketball team based in Goma, North Kivu. The team is named after the Virunga National Park, and its logo features a gorilla as this species can be found in the national park. Virunga won their first Congolese Cup in 2023, after overcoming Ami BK in the final which was hosted at Goma. The home arena of the team is the Bismack Biyombo Indoor Hall.

Virunga will represent the DR Congo in the Road to BAL in the 2024 qualifying tournament.

== Honours ==
Congolese Cup

- Champions (1): 2023

== Players ==
=== Current roster ===
The following is BC Virunga's roster in the 2024 BAL qualification tournament.

Note: Flags indicate national team eligibility at FIBA-sanctioned events. Players may hold other non-FIBA nationalities not displayed.

BC Virunga roster
Players
Coaches

Pos.	No.	Nat.	Name	Age
PG	0	(Democratic Republic of the Congo)	Mwana Mwamba, Arsène	23 – 8 April 2001
	1	(Democratic Republic of the Congo)	Mutala Ntita, Djedje	19 – 17 February 2006
	2	(Democratic Republic of the Congo)	Aganze Kanane, Bienfait	20 – 13 March 2005
	4	(Democratic Republic of the Congo)	Mabangala Maheshe, Obed	21 – 16 December 2003
	7	(Democratic Republic of the Congo)	Monze Nzamba, Jonathan	27 – 27 January 1998
	8	(Democratic Republic of the Congo)	Mulumba Tshimanga, William	18 – 24 December 2006
	10	(Chad)	Kamndoh Betoudji, Frank	26 – 30 September 1998
	11	(Democratic Republic of the Congo)	Bolangi Liseko, Bienvenue	23 – 29 December 2001
	13	(Democratic Republic of the Congo)	Mpoyi Donat, Chadrack	18 – 22 August 2006
	29	(Democratic Republic of the Congo)	Mampuya Nzuiki, Toussaint	26 – 3 July 1998
		(Democratic Republic of the Congo)	Cuma, Noe Toto	18 – 24 December 2006

Head coach

- (Democratic Republic of the Congo) Peter Mulolwa

Assistant coach(es)

- (Democratic Republic of the Congo) Christophe Ngenda
- (Democratic Republic of the Congo) Muamba Ilunga

Legend

- (C) Team captain
- Injured

- Roster
Updated: 10 October 2023
