= NBA Africa Game 2015 =

Team World	Team Africa
101	97
	1	2	3	4	Total
Team World	17	21	24	39	101
Team Africa	30	26	22	19	97
- Date: 1 August 2015
- Venue: Ellis Park Arena, Johannesburg, South Africa
- MVP: (South Sudan) Luol Deng (United States) Chris Paul

The 2015 NBA Africa Game was an exhibition basketball game played on 1 August 2015 in Ellis Park Arena in Johannesburg, South Africa. It was the first NBA game, and the first game involving any major North American professional sports league, to take place on the continent of Africa. It was contested between Team Africa, featuring NBA players and alumni that were born in or had parents born in Africa, and Team World, featuring NBA players from the rest of the world.

Team World won the exhibition game by a score of 101–97.

== Rosters ==
Team Africa
Pos.	Origin	Player	Team
F	Nigeria (Note: Aminu was born in the United States, but his parents are from Nigeria.)	Al-Farouq Aminu	Portland Trail Blazers
F	Nigeria (Note: Antetokounmpo was born in Greece and holds Greek nationality, but his parents are from Nigeria.)	Giannis Antetokounmpo	Milwaukee Bucks
F	Cameroon (Note: Batum holds French nationality, but his father is from Cameroon.)	Nicolas Batum	Charlotte Hornets
F	DR Congo	Bismack Biyombo	Toronto Raptors
F/C	Senegal (Note: Diaw holds French nationality, but his father is from Senegal.)	Boris Diaw	San Antonio Spurs
F/C	Senegal	Gorgui Dieng	Minnesota Timberwolves
F	South Sudan (Note: Deng holds British nationality, but he was born in what is now South Sudan.)	Luol Deng^{CAP}	Miami Heat
C	Nigeria	Festus Ezeli	Golden State Warriors
F/C	Congo (Note: Ibaka represents Spain in international competition, but he was born in the Republic of the Congo.)	Serge Ibaka^{INJ}	Oklahoma City Thunder
C	Ghana (Note: Mohammed was born in the United States, but his parents were born in Ghana.)	Nazr Mohammed	Chicago Bulls
F	Cameroon	Luc Mbah a Moute	Los Angeles Clippers
C	DR Congo	Dikembe Mutombo	retired NBA alumnus
C	Nigeria	Hakeem Olajuwon	retired NBA alumnus
Head coach: Gregg Popovich (San Antonio Spurs)

Team World
Pos.	Nat.	Player	Team
G	U.S.	Bradley Beal	Washington Wizards
G	U.S.	Trey Burke	Utah Jazz
F	U.S.	Kenneth Faried	Denver Nuggets
C	Spain	Marc Gasol	Memphis Grizzlies
F	Spain	Pau Gasol	Chicago Bulls
F	U.S.	Jeff Green	Memphis Grizzlies
G	U.S.	Chris Paul^{CAP}	Los Angeles Clippers
G	U.S.	Marcus Smart	Boston Celtics
G/F	U.S.	Evan Turner	Boston Celtics
F/C	Montenegro	Nikola Vučević	Orlando Magic
Head coach: Lionel Hollins (Brooklyn Nets)

- CAP Deng was the captain for Team Africa.
- CAP Paul was the captain for Team World.
- INJ Ibaka was unable to participate because of injury.

=== Coaches and managers ===
San Antonio Spurs head coach, three-time NBA Coach of the Year, and five time NBA champion Gregg Popovich coached Team Africa, including his team's Boris Diaw. Mike Budenholzer, who was named Coach of the Year for the prior NBA season, and Monty Williams served as assistant coaches for the African side. Billy King, general manager for the Brooklyn Nets, held that position for Africa along with former NBA Executive of the Year and Nigerian native Masai Ujiri of the Toronto Raptors.

Team World was coached by Lionel Hollins and assistant Brad Stevens. They were managed by Spurs' general manager R. C. Buford.
