= UNAM Wolves =

- League: KBA Premier League
- Founded: 2012
- Location: Windhoek, Namibia
- Head coach: Titus Mwahafa
- Ownership: University of Namibia

UNAM Wolves is a Namibian basketball club based in Windhoek. The team is affiliated with the University of Namibia and began competitive play in 2012, as the UNAM Rebels. The Wolves play in the KBA Premier League, the nation's premier league that is organised by the Khomas Basketball Association.

The Wolves won the KBA Independence Cup in 2022. As winners, they played in the Road to BAL tournament in October 2023, becoming the second Namibian team to play in the competition, after Lions.

== Honours ==
KBA Independence Cup

- Winners (1): 2022

== Players ==
=== Current roster ===
Note: Flags indicate national team eligibility at FIBA-sanctioned events. Players may hold other non-FIBA nationalities not displayed.

UNAM Wolves roster
Players
Coaches

Pos.	No.	Nat.	Name	Ht.	Age
PF	0	(Namibia)	Ndjavera, Yaurovandu	194 m (636 ft 6 in)	29 – 28 November 1995
PG	3	(Namibia)	Kaunami, Vetjitiraije	194 m (636 ft 6 in)	21 – 5 September 2003
PG	5	(Namibia)	Katoko, Michael	176 m (577 ft 5 in)	36 – 6 February 1989
SF	6	(Namibia)	Nghixulifwa, Allan	196 m (643 ft 1 in)	39 – 28 September 1985
SG	7	(Namibia)	Kazeurua, Mabeth	186 m (610 ft 3 in)	36 – 14 June 1988
G	8	(Namibia)	Tjirimuje, Kautjeza	186 m (610 ft 3 in)	26 – 6 March 1999
SF	9	(Namibia)	Hilukiluah, Elijah	200 m (656 ft 2 in)	23 – 10 February 2002
PF	10	(Namibia)	Mukumbutaa, Michael Popisi	197 m (646 ft 4 in)	35 – 3 July 1989
PF	11	(Democratic Republic of the Congo)	Kazadi Muanza, Kevin	200 m (656 ft 2 in)	23 – 24 July 2001
SF	12	(Namibia)	Mutakalilumo, Mevin	194 m (636 ft 6 in)	28 – 22 February 1997
C	13	(Namibia)	Melani, Ellen	195 m (639 ft 9 in)	42 – 22 August 1982

Head coach

- (Namibia) Titus Mwahafa

Legend

- (C) Team captain
- Injured

- Roster
Updated: 22 October 2023
