= Mohab Yasser =

Egyptian basketball player

Mohab Yasser مهاب ياسر
No. 15 – Zamalek
- Position: Shooting guard / point guard
- League: Basketball Africa League

Personal information
- Born: 7 June 2002 (age 24) Cairo, Egypt
- Listed height: 1.96 m (6 ft 5 in)
- Listed weight: 83 kg (183 lb)

Career information
- High school: NBA Academy Africa (Saly, Senegal)
- College: East Tennessee State (2021–2022)
- Playing career: 2020–present

Career history
- 2020–2021: Zamalek
- 2022–present: Zamalek

Career highlights
- BAL champion (2021); Egyptian League champion (2021); Egyptian League Best Young Player (2021); SoCon All-freshman team (2022)
Medals
Men's basketball
Representing Egypt
Islamic Solidarity Games
Gold medal – first place	2025 Riyadh	3x3 basketball

Mohab Yasser Abdalatif (Arabic: مهاب ياسر; born 7 June 2002) is an Egyptian basketball player for Zamalek of the Basketball Africa League (BAL), as well as for the Egypt national basketball team. Standing at 1.96 m (6 ft 5 in), he plays as shooting guard or point guard.

== Early life ==
Born in Cairo, Yasser went on to play in the NBA Academy Africa in Saly, Senegal. He also appeared at Basketball Without Borders camps.

== Professional career ==
Abdalatif was on the Zamalek roster for the 2020–21 season. He was on the Zamalek roster for the 2021 BAL season and was the youngest player to play in the inaugural season of the league at age 18. He was also the first prospect from an NBA Academy to play in the BAL. Yasser started in all games and won the first-ever BAL championship with his team, averaging 9 points over six games.

In the same season, the 2020–21 season, Yasser won his first Egyptian Basketball Super League title with Zamalek, after helping defeating Al Ittihad in the finals. In the deciding Game 5, Yasser added 17 points to the 84–80 overtime win. After the season, he was named the league's Best Young Player.

On 9 May 2022, Yasser returned to Zamalek and signed a 4-year contract after his one-year playing college basketball with East Tennessee State.

== College career ==
On 10 June 2021, Yasser was officially announced as a player for the East Tennessee State Buccaneers for the 2021–22 season. As a true freshman at ETSU, Yasser played in all 32 games for the Buccaneers. He averaged 7.2 points and 3.8 rebounds per game. Yasser was also named to the 2021–22 SoCon All-freshman team.

== National team career ==
Yasser played in the 2020 FIBA U18 African Championship with the Egyptian under-18 team. He led the tournament in scoring with 27.6 points per game, and was named to the All-Star Five of the tournament.

In June 2021, Yasser was selected for the Egyptian senior team for the first time by head coach Ahmed Marei.

== Career statistics ==
Legend
GP	Games played	GS	Games started	MPG	Minutes per game
FG%	Field goal percentage	3P%	3-point field goal percentage	FT%	Free throw percentage
RPG	Rebounds per game	APG	Assists per game	SPG	Steals per game
BPG	Blocks per game	PPG	Points per game	**Bold**	Career high
†	Won an BAL championship	*	Led the league

=== BAL ===
Year	Team	GP	GS	MPG	FG%	3P%	FT%	RPG	APG	SPG	BPG	PPG
2021†	Zamalek	**6**	**6**	**20.8**	**.697***	**.286**	**.600**	**3.5**	**1.7**	**1.0**	.0	**9.0**
2022	Zamalek	3	0	16.7	.529	.167	.500	2.3	1.0	0.7	.0	7.0

=== College ===
Year	Team	GP	GS	MPG	FG%	3P%	FT%	RPG	APG	SPG	BPG	PPG
2021–22	East Tennessee State	32	1	22.1	.503	.319	.745	3.8	0.8	0.6	0.3	7.2

== Personal life ==
Yasser is the son of a former Egyptian national team player.
