= Israel Otobo =

Nigerian basketball player (born 2004)

No. 20 – City Oilers
- Position: Centre
- League: Road to BAL

Personal information
- Born: 31 May 2004 (age 21)
- Listed height: 2.03 m (6 ft 8 in)

Career information
- Playing career: 2022–present

Career history
- 2022: Nigeria Customs
- 2023–2024: Dynamo
- 2024: APR BBC
- 2024–present: City Oilers

Career highlights
- Viva Basketball League champion (2023)

Israel Oyoro Otobo (born 31 May 2004) is a Nigerian professional basketball player who currently plays for the City Oilers). Playing at Centre, he has played for the Nigeria national team since 2023.

== Career ==
Growing up in the Bayelsa State, Otobo dreamed of becoming a professional footballer, but switched to basketball at age 14. His father enrolled him at Patriot Academy, where he stayed two years before moving to Lagos. He made his debut for Nigeria Customs in the Nigerian Premier League in 2022 and helped the Customs reach the finals, where they lost to the Kwara Falcons.

Otobo joined Burundian club Dynamo in the 2023 season and helped them win the domestic Viva Basketball League over Urunani. Consequently, Otobo and Dynamo played in the 2024 BAL qualification. There, he averaged 14 points, 13.1 rebounds and 1.5 assists and had four double-doubles in eight games, as Otobo helped Dynamo become the first Burundian team in history to qualify for the Basketball Africa League (BAL).

On 9 March 2024, Otobo made his BAL debut with 21 points and 13 rebounds in Dynamo's 73–86 win over the Cape Town Tigers. However, Dynamo forfeited its following games as the team refused to wear the league's sponsor logo Visit Rwanda amidst political tensions between Burundi and Rwanda.

In November 2024, he joined the City Oilers from Uganda.

== National team career ==
Otobo made his debut for the Nigeria national team in February 2023 during the 2023 World Cup qualifiers. He averaged 7.7 points and 7.3 rebounds in three qualifying matches.
