= Ulrich Chomche =

Cameroonian basketball player (born 2005)

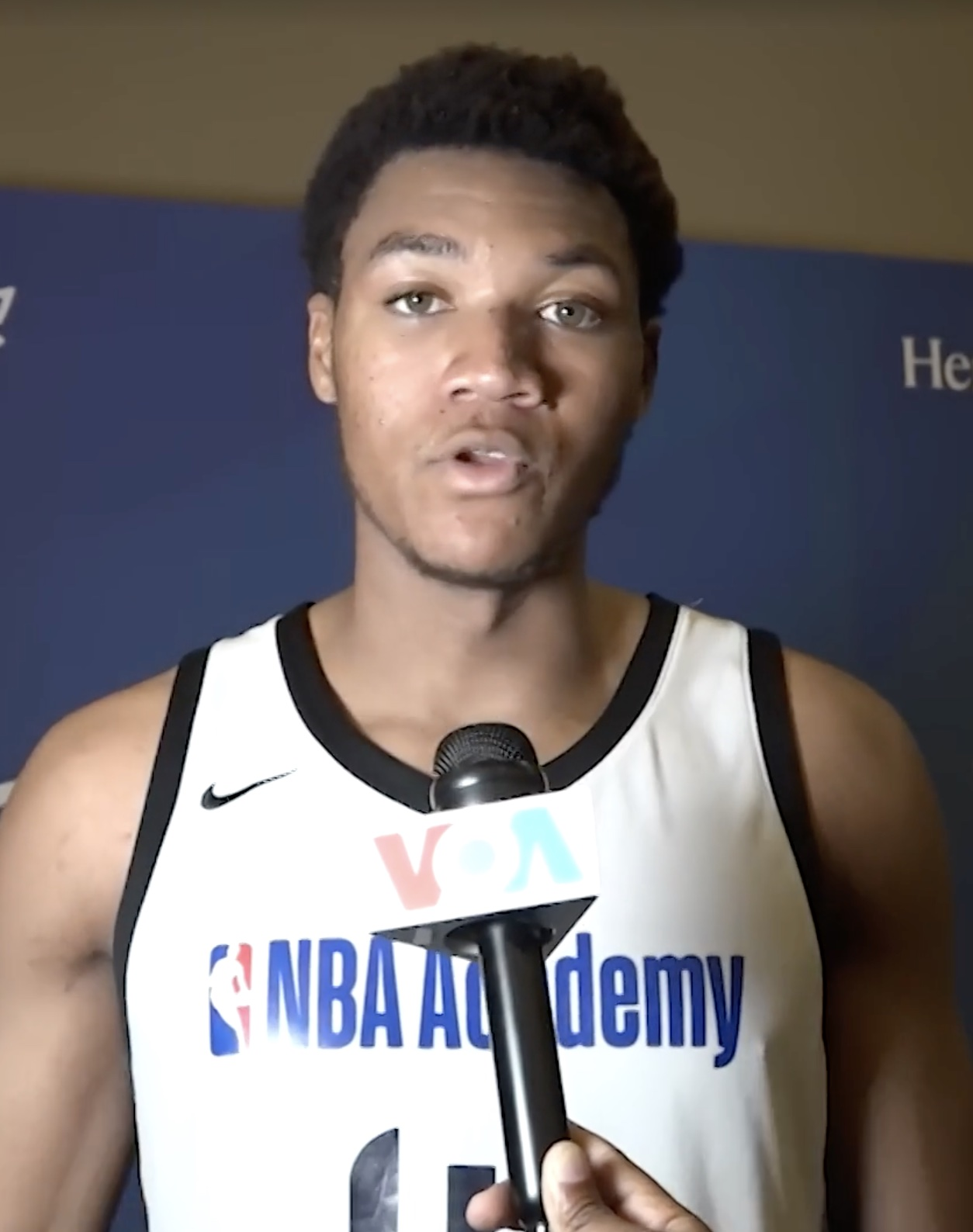
- Chomche in 2023

No. 14 – Balkan Botevgrad
- Position: Center
- League: NBL; EuroCup

Personal information
- Born: 30 December 2005 (age 20) Bafang, Cameroon
- Listed height: 6 ft 11 in (2.11 m)
- Listed weight: 235 lb (107 kg)

Career information
- High school: NBA Academy Africa (Saly, Senegal)
- NBA draft: 2024: 2nd round, 57th overall pick
- Drafted by: Memphis Grizzlies
- Playing career: 2022–present

Career history
- 2022: FAP
- 2023: REG
- 2024–2025: Toronto Raptors
- 2024–2025: →Raptors 905
- 2026–present: Balkan Botevgrad

Career highlights
- Nike Hoop Summit (2024)
- Stats at NBA.com
- Stats at Basketball Reference

Ulrich Kamka Chomche (born 30 December 2005) is a Cameroonian professional basketball player for Balkan Botevgrad of the Bulgarian National Basketball League (NBL) and the EuroCup. At 6 ft 11 in (2.11 m), he plays the center position.

A graduate of the NBA Academy Africa, Chomche is the first former Basketball Africa League (BAL) player to be drafted into the NBA. He has been labeled by ESPN as the best Cameroonian prospect of his generation, and the best since Joel Embiid.

== Early life ==
Chomche was born in Bafang, in the West Province of Cameroon, and picked up basketball at age 11 due to peer pressure because he was the tallest kid in his neighborhood. One year later, he joined the NBA Academy Africa in Saly, Senegal and started studying English. Chomche played at the 2022 Basketball Without Borders camp in Cairo and was named the Defensive MVP among boys at the camp.

== Professional career ==
=== FAP (2022) ===
Chomche made his debut in the Basketball Africa League (BAL) at age 16 in 2022, playing for Cameroonian club FAP under the BAL Elevate program. This program allocated players from the NBA Academy Africa to professional teams. He averaged 2.1 points and 3.7 rebounds in 11.3 minutes per game, and was part of FAP's run to fourth place. On 16 April, he grabbed a career-high seven rebounds against Petro de Luanda.

=== REG (2023) ===
The next year, in 2023, Chomche was drafted by the Rwandan team REG to play in his second consecutive BAL season. During the tournament, he received praise from former NBA player Joakim Noah.

In March 2024, Chomche was drafted by Rwandan club APR for the 2024 BAL season. He was eventually left off of the roster to prepare for the 2024 NBA draft.

=== Toronto Raptors / Raptors 905 (2024–2025) ===
On 15 April 2024, Chomche declared for the 2024 NBA draft. He was the youngest player in the draft.

On 27 June 2024, Chomche was selected with the 57th overall pick by the Memphis Grizzlies in the 2024 NBA draft, however, immediately on draft night, he was traded to the Toronto Raptors. He became the first NBA Academy Africa prospect to be drafted, as well as the first player to be drafted directly out of any NBA Academy. He is also the first former BAL player to be selected. On 10 July, he signed a two-way contract with the Raptors. In seven games for Toronto, Chomche averaged 0.7 points, 1.1 rebounds, and 0.3 assists. On 19 February 2025, Chomche was ruled out for the remainder of the season after suffering a partial proximal MCL tear in his right knee. On 16 October 2025, he was waived by Toronto.

=== Balkan Botevgrad (2026–present) ===
On 13 August 2026, Chomche signed with Balkan Botevgrad of the Bulgarian National Basketball League (NBL).

== National team career ==
In February 2023, Chomche was first selected for the Cameroon senior national team for the 2023 World Cup qualifiers. He made his debut on 24 February 2023 in Alexandria, playing eight minutes in an 85–56 win over DR Congo.

== Player profile ==
Standing at 6 ft 11 in (2.11 m) with a 7 ft 4 in (2.24 m) wingspan, Chomche is best at the defensive end of the court and has been praised for his defensive and shot blocking abilities. His offensive game was described as needing a lot of work ahead of the 2024 NBA draft.

== Career statistics ==
Legend
GP	Games played	GS	Games started	MPG	Minutes per game
FG%	Field goal percentage	3P%	3-point field goal percentage	FT%	Free throw percentage
RPG	Rebounds per game	APG	Assists per game	SPG	Steals per game
BPG	Blocks per game	PPG	Points per game	**Bold**	Career high

=== NBA ===
Year	Team	GP	GS	MPG	FG%	3P%	FT%	RPG	APG	SPG	BPG	PPG
2024–25	Toronto	7	0	4.6	.400	–	.500	1.1	.3	.0	.1	.7
Career		7	0	4.6	.400	–	.500	1.1	.3	.0	.1	.7

=== BAL ===
Year	Team	GP	GS	MPG	FG%	3P%	FT%	RPG	APG	SPG	BPG	PPG
2022	FAP	**7**	1	11.3	.304	.200	–	3.7	.1	.3	1.6	2.1
2023	REG	6	0	19.0	.345	.125	.545	4.8	.7	1.0	1.0	4.5

=== Road to BAL ===
Year	Team	GP	GS	MPG	FG%	3P%	FT%	RPG	APG	SPG	BPG	PPG
2022–23	NBA Academy Africa	3	**3**	22.3	.188	.111	.300	6.7	1.3	**2.0**	**2.7**	3.3
2023–24	NBA Academy Africa	3	**3**	**30.1**	**.424**	**.381**	**.750**	**9.0**	**3.3**	1.3	**2.7**	**13.0**

== See also ==
- List of oldest and youngest NBA players
