= Terry Larrier =

American basketball player (born 1995)

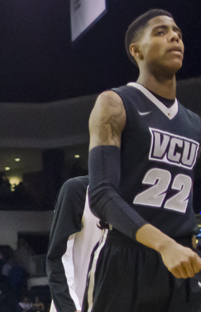
- Larrier playing for VCU in 2014

Free agent
- Position: Small forward / shooting guard

Personal information
- Born: August 15, 1995 (age 31) The Bronx, New York, U.S.
- Listed height: 6 ft 7 in (2.01 m)
- Listed weight: 185 lb (84 kg)

Career information
- High school: The Phelps School (Malvern, Pennsylvania)
- College: VCU (2014–2015); UConn (2016–2018)
- NBA draft: 2018: undrafted
- Playing career: 2019–present

Career history
- 2019–2020: Agua Caliente Clippers
- 2020–2021: Norrköping Dolphins
- 2021: Titanes del Distrito Nacional
- 2021–2022: Wisconsin Herd
- 2022: Grises de Humacao
- 2022: Metros de Santiago
- 2022: CSO Voluntari
- 2023: Gaiteros del Zulia
- 2023: Cape Town Tigers
- 2023: CS Antonine
- 2024: Al-Shamal SC
- 2024: Titanes del Distrito Nacional
- 2024: Santos del Potosí
- Stats at Basketball Reference

Terry Elijah Larrier (born August 15, 1995) is an American professional basketball player who last played for the Santos del Potosí of the Liga Nacional de Baloncesto Profesional. He played college basketball for the VCU Rams and the UConn Huskies.

== College career ==
Larrier first played college basketball with the VCU Rams, then departed after the 2014–15 season to join the Connecticut Huskies. Due to NCAA regulations, Larrier redshirted during the Huskies' 2015–16 season. He then injured his left knee and tore his ACL four games into the 2016–17 season.

Larrier began his senior season with a 27-point game but missed four games with a nasal fracture that required surgery. He posted 13.9 points and 4.8 rebounds per game as a senior. After the 2017–18 season, Larrier announced he would forgo his college eligibility, and enter the 2018 NBA draft. He graduated with a degree in urban and community studies.

== Professional career ==
After going undrafted in the 2018 NBA draft. he joined the Memphis Grizzlies for the NBA Summer League. Larrier signed a training camp contract with the Dallas Mavericks on July 31, 2018. He was waived on August 9, 2018, after suffering an ankle injury. On June 26, 2019, Larrier was listed in the roster of San Antonio Spurs for 2019 NBA Summer League hosted at Vivint Smart Home Arena.

For the 2019–20 season, Larrier signed with the Agua Caliente Clippers of the NBA G League. He injured his ankle on January 23, 2020, ending his season. Larrier averaged 7.6 points and 2.3 rebounds per game.

On August 11, 2020, Larrier signed with the Norrköping Dolphins of the Swedish league. In his debut, he contributed 26 points and 5 rebounds in an 83–77 win against BC Luleå. Larrier averaged 17 points and 5 rebounds per game.

On July 14, 2021, Larrier signed with Stal Ostrów Wielkopolski of the Polish Basketball League, but did not appear in a game for the club.

In October 2021, he joined the Wisconsin Herd after being acquired in a trade. Larrier was removed from the team on February 2, 2022. On February 10, 2022, Larrier was reacquired by the Wisconsin Herd of the NBA G League.

On August 2, 2022, he has signed with CSO Voluntari of the Liga Națională.

In October 2023, the Cape Town Tigers announced they had signed Larier on their Instagram account. Larier made his debut on November 21, 2023, and scored a team-high 25 points in a 76–61 win over Dynamo in the Road to BAL.

== Career statistics ==
Legend
GP	Games played	GS	Games started	MPG	Minutes per game
FG%	Field goal percentage	3P%	3-point field goal percentage	FT%	Free throw percentage
RPG	Rebounds per game	APG	Assists per game	SPG	Steals per game
BPG	Blocks per game	PPG	Points per game	**Bold**	Career high

=== College ===
Year	Team	GP	GS	MPG	FG%	3P%	FT%	RPG	APG	SPG	BPG	PPG
2014–15	VCU	**36**	6	18.5	.343	.262	.709	3.0	.6	.5	.1	6.6
2015–16	Connecticut	Redshirt										
2016–17	Connecticut	4	4	26.5	**.488**	.308	.615	**5.0**	**1.8**	.3	**.5**	13.5
2017–18	Connecticut	29	**28**	**34.0**	.398	**.378**	**.789**	4.8	.9	**.7**	.2	**13.9**
Career		69	38	25.5	.385	.322	.735	3.9	.8	.6	.2	10.1
