= Chris Obekpa =

Nigerian basketball player (born 1993)

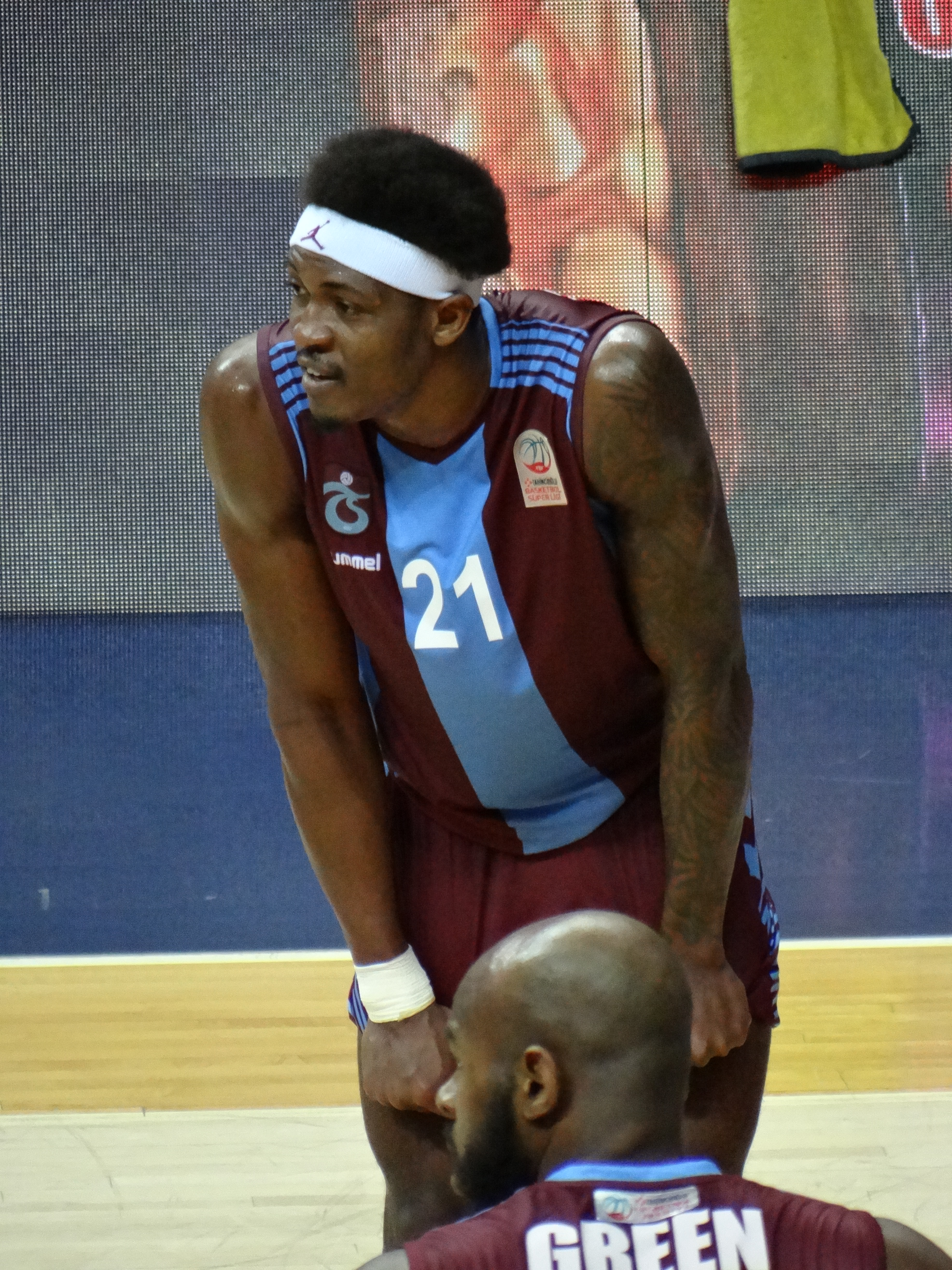
- Obekpa playing for Trabzonspor in 2018

Free agent
- Position: Center

Personal information
- Born: 14 November 1993 (age 33) Makurdi, Nigeria
- Listed height: 6 ft 9 in (2.06 m)
- Listed weight: 230 lb (104 kg)

Career information
- High school: Our Savior New American School (Centereach, New York)
- College: St. John's (2012–2015)
- NBA draft: 2016: undrafted
- Playing career: 2016–present

Career history
- 2016–2017: Santa Cruz Warriors
- 2017–2018: Trabzonspor
- 2018–2019: Al Riyadi
- 2022: SLAC
- 2022: Al-Ahli Benghazi
- 2022: Rivers Hoopers
- 2023: Al-Karamah SC
- 2023: ABC Fighters
- 2023: Al-Arabi SC
- 2023: Dynamo
- 2023–2024: Sichuan Blue Whales
- 2024: AS Douanes
- 2024–2025: Fujian Sturgeons

Career highlights
- CBA blocks leader (2024); BAL blocks leader (2022); BSL blocks leader (2018); NCAA blocks leader (2013)
- Stats at Basketball Reference

Christopher Ewaoche Obekpa (born 14 November 1993) is a Nigerian professional basketball player who last played for the Fujian Sturgeons of the Chinese Basketball Association (CBA).

He played college basketball for St. John's University in Jamaica, New York from 2012 to 2015. As a freshman in 2012–13 he led NCAA Division I in blocks per game with a 4.03 average. After three years at St. John's, Obekpa transferred to UNLV, redshirted 2015–16, but then declared for the 2016 NBA draft.

== Early life ==
Chris Obekpa was born in Makurdi, Nigeria to parents Elizabeth O. Ameh, his mother, and Gabriel Obekpa. He has six sisters and three brothers. His grandfather used to be the king of the Idoma tribe, his father is a prince, and his uncle Elias Ikeoyi Obekpa is the current king.

Obekpa's grew up around soccer fans, but his interest in basketball was stronger. Word of his talents spread and he eventually was selected to play for the Nigerian under-16 national team. In 2010, he moved to the United States to attend his final two years of high school in hopes of being noticed by college programs (Chris' older brother, Ofu, played one year of basketball at the University of Maine at Machias). He moved to New York City and enrolled at Our Savior New American School (OSNAS) in Centereach. As a junior in 2010–11 he helped the school finish with a 17–10 record behind averages of 10 points, eight rebounds and five blocks per game. In three separate tournaments he was named the Most Valuable Player.

The following season, Obekpa's senior year in 2011–12, he led OSNAS to a 25–5 overall record as well as a final national top-10 ranking by MaxPreps.com. He nearly averaged a triple-double: 12 points, 13 rebounds and nine blocks per game. The National Association of Christian Athletes named him a first team All-American, and national recruiting services listed him as a top-100 overall recruit (top-20 for centers).

== College career ==
Colleges that expressed interest in him were UCLA, Connecticut, DePaul, Cincinnati, Oregon, and St. John's, among others. Obekpa ultimately chose St. John's because it was in his adopted home city and he did not want to have to re-adjust to another city's culture so quickly; he felt comfortable in New York.

Obekpa quickly established himself as a premier shot blocker during his freshman campaign in 2012–13. In his first collegiate game, he set a St. John's record with eight blocks. Less than one month later, on 8 December 2012, he recorded a new school record 11 blocks in a game against Fordham; this total was one shy of the Big East Conference record. Obekpa finished his first year as the top shot blocker in the nation with a 4.03 per game average after recording 133 blocks in 33 games. St. John's earned a berth into the 2013 National Invitation Tournament where they lost to Virginia in the second round.

On 4 August 2015, Obekpa announced he was transferring to UNLV. After sitting out the 2015–16 season due to NCAA transfer rules, Obekpa declared for the NBA draft.

On 23 April 2016, Obekpa hired an agent, which officially prohibited him from finishing his college career.

== Professional career ==
After going undrafted in the 2016 NBA draft, Obekpa joined the Miami Heat for the 2016 NBA Summer League. On 21 October, he signed with the Golden State Warriors, but was waived the next day. On 31 October 2016, he was acquired by the Santa Cruz Warriors of the NBA Development League as an affiliate player of Golden State. In July 2017, Obekpa played for the Phoenix Suns during the 2017 NBA Summer League.

For the 2017–18 season, he played in Turkey with Trabzonspor. For the 2018–19 season, Obekpa played in Lebanon for Al Riyadi.

On 7 June 2019, Obekpa signed with Italian team Sidigas Avellino. He never made it to Italy however, instead signing with the New Zealand Breakers for the 2019–20 NBL season on 6 August 2019. He was released by the Breakers a week before the start of the season due to a knee injury, was replaced by Brandon Ashley.

On 28 February 2022, Obekpa joined Guinean club SLAC of the Basketball Africa League (BAL) In five games in the Sahara Conference, he led the league with 4.6 blocks per game. On 25 September 2022, he joined Al-Ahli Benghazi for the Arab Club Basketball Championship. In November 2022, Obekpa signed a short-term contract with Nigerian club Rivers Hoopers in the 2022 NBBF Premier League Final 8.

In January 2023, Obekpa joined the Al-Karamah SC of the Syrian Basketball League. In February 2023, he signed with the ABC Fighters for Season 3 of the BAL. He averaged 3.6 points and 7.4 rebounds in five games with the Fighters. On November 21, 2023, Obekpa made his debut for Burundian club Dynamo with 8 points and 8 rebounds in a 76–61 Road to BAL loss to the Cape Town Tigers.

Obekpa joined Senegalese club AS Douanes for the 2024 BAL season and made his debut with the team on May 4, 2024.

In November 2024, Obekpa joined Urunani BBC from Burundi.

== BAL career statistics ==
Legend
GP	Games played	GS	Games started	MPG	Minutes per game
FG%	Field goal percentage	3P%	3-point field goal percentage	FT%	Free throw percentage
RPG	Rebounds per game	APG	Assists per game	SPG	Steals per game
BPG	Blocks per game	PPG	Points per game	**Bold**	Career high
*	Led the league

Year	Team	GP	GS	MPG	FG%	3P%	FT%	RPG	APG	SPG	BPG	PPG
2022	SLAC	5	5	34.0	.553	.571	.615	10.2	2.0	1.8	4.6*	13.4
2023	ABC Fighters	5	5	26.4	.333	.000	1.000	7.4	2.4	1.2	1.4	3.6

== See also ==
- List of NCAA Division I men's basketball season blocks leaders
