= Hasheem Thabeet =

Tanzanian basketball player (born 1987)

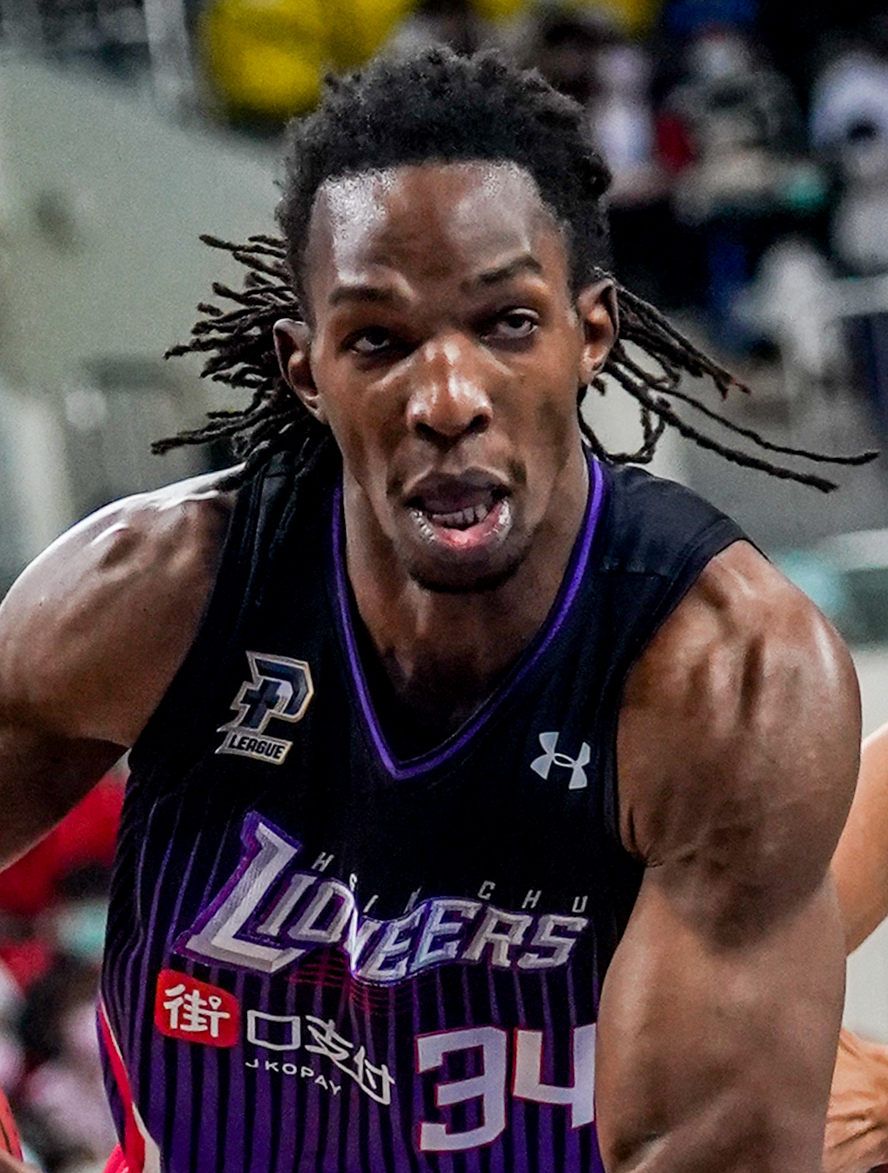
- Thabeet with Hsinchu JKO Lioneers in 2021

No. 34 – Dar City
- Position: Center
- League: Road to BAL

Personal information
- Born: 16 February 1987 (age 39) Dar es Salaam, Tanzania
- Listed height: 7 ft 3 in (2.21 m)
- Listed weight: 260 lb (118 kg)

Career information
- High school: Cypress Christian School (Houston, Texas)
- College: UConn (2006–2009)
- NBA draft: 2009: 1st round, 2nd overall pick
- Drafted by: Memphis Grizzlies
- Playing career: 2009–present

Career history
- 2009–2011: Memphis Grizzlies
- 2010: →Dakota Wizards
- 2011–2012: Houston Rockets
- 2011: →Rio Grande Valley Vipers
- 2012: Portland Trail Blazers
- 2012–2014: Oklahoma City Thunder
- 2014–2015: Grand Rapids Drive
- 2017–2018: Yokohama B-Corsairs
- 2019–2020: Fort Wayne Mad Ants
- 2020–2021: Hsinchu JKO Lioneers
- 2021: Savio
- 2022–2023: Sichuan Blue Whales
- 2023: TaiwanBeer HeroBears
- 2023: Pazi
- 2024: Kaohsiung 17LIVE Steelers
- 2024–present: Dar City

Career highlights
- P.League+ rebounding leader (2021); P.League+ blocks leader (2021); P.League+ Defensive Player of Year (2021); NBA D-League All-Defensive Third Team (2015); 2× NABC Defensive Player of the Year (2008, 2009); Consensus second-team All-American (2009); Big East co-Player of the Year (2009); 2× Big East Defensive Player of the Year (2008, 2009)
- Stats at NBA.com
- Stats at Basketball Reference

Hasheem Thabeet (born Hashim Thabit Manka; 16 February 1987) is a Tanzanian professional basketball player for Dar City of the Basketball Africa League (BAL). He played college basketball for the UConn Huskies before being drafted second overall in the 2009 NBA draft by the Memphis Grizzlies. Thabeet's performance as a second overall draft pick has led many analysts to label him as one of the "biggest busts" in NBA history.

== Early life ==
Thabeet did not begin to play basketball until the age of 15, when he began to watch pick-up games in Tanzania. He started playing basketball while attending Makongo Secondary School in Dar es Salaam. When first recruited from Tanzania, Thabeet was fluent in Swahili but knew little English. He played high school basketball at Cypress Christian School in Houston, Texas, where Thabeet graduated in 2006.

== College career ==
As a freshman for the Connecticut Huskies, Thabeet averaged 6.2 points and 3.8 blocks per game. On 3 December 2006, he tied a UConn record for blocks in a game with 10. Thabeet was named to the 2007 All-Big East Rookie Team, along with teammate Jerome Dyson.

As a sophomore, Thabeet saw increased minutes and he averaged 10.5 points, 7.9 rebounds, 4.5 blocks on the season. On 5 January 2008, Thabeet tied his career high in blocks with 10 in the Huskies' 73–67 loss at University of Notre Dame. He was named Big East Defensive Player of the Year and to the All-Big East second team.

As a junior, Thabeet emerged on the national scene, averaging 13.6 points and 10.8 rebounds. He earned his first career triple-double against Providence College on 31 January 2009, with 15 points, 11 rebounds, and 10 blocks. Thabeet finished with 152 blocks on the season. He was named Big East Defensive Player of the Year and was co-Big East Player of the Year with Pitt's DeJuan Blair. Thabeet was also named second team All-America and National Defensive Player of the Year.

Thabeet surpassed the 1,000-point mark against Purdue on 26 March 2009. He was the third UConn player that season to do so (Jerome Dyson and A. J. Price were the others). Thabeet helped lead UConn to their first Final Four appearance since 2004.

In April 2009, Thabeet declared for the NBA draft, forgoing his final year of college eligibility.

== Professional career ==
=== Memphis Grizzlies (2009–2011) ===
Thabeet was selected with the second overall pick in 2009 NBA draft by the Memphis Grizzlies, ahead of two future NBA MVPs James Harden and Stephen Curry, becoming the first Tanzanian-born NBA player. On 13 December 2009, Thabeet had a season-high five blocks.

On 25 February 2010, Thabeet was assigned to the Dakota Wizards of the NBA Development League, becoming the tallest and then-highest-drafted player (surpassed by Anthony Bennett in 2015, the first overall pick in the 2013 NBA draft) to be sent to the D-League. On 8 March, he was recalled by the Grizzlies.

=== Houston Rockets (2011–2012) ===
On 24 February 2011, Thabeet was traded, along with a future first-round pick, to the Houston Rockets in exchange for Shane Battier and Ish Smith. On 21 March, he was assigned with the Rio Grande Valley Vipers. On 11 April, he was recalled by the Rockets.

=== Portland Trail Blazers (2012) ===
On 15 March 2012, Thabeet was traded, along with Jonny Flynn and a future second-round pick, to the Portland Trail Blazers in exchange for Marcus Camby.

=== Oklahoma City Thunder (2012–2014) ===
On 11 July 2012, Thabeet signed with the Oklahoma City Thunder. On 26 November, in a 114–69 victory over the Charlotte Bobcats, he recorded his first career double-double with 13 points (a career high) and 10 rebounds.

=== Grand Rapids Drive (2014–2015) ===
On 26 August 2014, Thabeet was traded to the Philadelphia 76ers in exchange for a trade exception and a 2015 protected second-round draft pick. Six days later, he was waived by the 76ers.

On 25 September 2014, Thabeet signed with the Detroit Pistons. However, he was later waived on 20 October.

On 1 November 2014, Thabeet was acquired by the Grand Rapids Drive of the NBA Development League as an affiliate player of the Pistons. In 49 games for the Drive, he averaged 8.6 points and 6.2 rebounds per game.

In July 2015, Thabeet joined the NBA D-League Select Team for the 2015 NBA Summer League.

=== Yokohama B-Corsairs (2017–2018) ===
On 29 September 2017, Thabeet signed with the Yokohama B-Corsairs of the Japanese B.League.

=== Fort Wayne Mad Ants (2019–2020) ===
For the 2019–20 season, Thabeet signed with the Fort Wayne Mad Ants of the NBA G League. He was cut on 16 January 2020.

=== Hsinchu JKO Lioneers (2020–2021) ===
On 25 September 2020, Thabeet signed with the Hsinchu JKO Lioneers of the Taiwanese P. League+. He was the league's rebounding leader, blocks leader and Defensive Player of Year for the 2020–21 season.

On 28 October 2021, Thabeet signed with the Tainan TSG GhostHawks of the Taiwanese T1 League. Chien Wei-Cheng, the general manager of the Tainan TSG GhostHawks, indicated that Thabeet would not join the Tainan TSG GhostHawks on 24 December.

=== Savio (2021) ===
In 2021, Thabeet played for Savio in his native Tanzania and guided the team to the Dar es Salaam Regional Basketball League (RBA) title and was named the Finals MVP.

=== TaiwanBeer HeroBears (2023) ===
On 8 March 2023, TaiwanBeer HeroBears registered Thabeet as import player. Five days later, Thabeet signed with the TaiwanBeer HeroBears of the T1 League.

=== Tanzania (2023–present) ===
In September 2023, Thabeet joined the roster of Tanzanian champions Pazi for the 2024 BAL qualification tournaments.

In December 2024, Thabeet was on the roster of Tanzania's Dar City and played in the inaugural East Africa Basketball Championship Cup (EABCC). He guided them to the second place with a 4–1 record.

== Career statistics ==
Legend
GP	Games played	GS	Games started	MPG	Minutes per game
FG%	Field goal percentage	3P%	3-point field goal percentage	FT%	Free throw percentage
RPG	Rebounds per game	APG	Assists per game	SPG	Steals per game
BPG	Blocks per game	PPG	Points per game	**Bold**	Career high

=== Regular season ===
Year	Team	GP	GS	MPG	FG%	3P%	FT%	RPG	APG	SPG	BPG	PPG
2009–10	Memphis	**68**	**13**	**13.0**	.588	—	.581	**3.6**	**.2**	.2	**1.3**	**3.1**
2010–11	Memphis	45	0	8.2	.436	—	.543	1.7	.1	.2	.3	1.2
2010–11	Houston	2	0	2.0	.000	—	—	.0	.0	.0	.5	.0
2011–12	Houston	5	0	4.6	**1.000**	—	—	1.4	.0	.0	.4	1.2
2011–12	Portland	15	3	7.7	.444	—	**.650**	2.3	.0	.1	.5	1.9
2012–13	Oklahoma City	66	4	11.7	.604	—	.604	3.0	.2	**.5**	.9	2.4
2013–14	Oklahoma City	23	0	8.3	.565	—	.200	1.7	.0	.2	.4	1.2
Career		224	20	10.5	.567	—	.578	2.7	.1	.3	.8	2.2

=== Playoffs ===
Year	Team	GP	GS	MPG	FG%	3P%	FT%	RPG	APG	SPG	BPG	PPG
2013	Oklahoma City	**4**	0	**6.5**	**.500**	—	—	**1.5**	.0	**.3**	.0	**.5**
2014	Oklahoma City	2	0	3.5	—	—	—	.0	.0	.0	.0	.0
Career		6	0	5.5	.500	—	—	1.0	.0	.2	.0	.3

=== NBA G League ===
==== Regular season ====
Year	Team	GP	GS	MPG	FG%	3P%	FT%	RPG	APG	SPG	BPG	PPG
2009–10	Dakota	6	4	**31.3**	.500	–	**.690**	**11.2**	**.7**	.7	**3.2**	**13.8**
2010–11	Rio Grande	6	5	27.8	**.615**	–	.571	8.0	**.7**	**.8**	2.7	10.0
2014–15	Grand Rapids	**48**	**42**	22.3	.593	–	.654	6.2	.4	.4	2.4	8.6
2019–20	Fort Wayne	9	2	16.4	.577	–	.600	4.3	**.7**	.1	1.8	4.0
Career		68	53	22.8	.582	–	.652	6.6	.4	.4	2.4	8.6

==== Playoffs ====
Year	Team	GP	GS	MPG	FG%	3P%	FT%	RPG	APG	SPG	BPG	PPG
2011	Rio Grande	1	1	22.0	.000	–	.750	6.0	2.0	.0	1.0	3.0

== Personal life ==
Thabeet is Muslim and fasts during Ramadan.

== See also ==
- List of tallest players in National Basketball Association history
- List of NCAA Division I men's basketball career blocks leaders
