= Zambia Basketball League =

Basketball league in Zambia

- Organising body: Zambia Basketball Federation (ZBF)
- Country: Zambia
- Number of teams: 10
- Level on pyramid: 1
- International cup: Basketball Africa League (BAL)
- Current champions: Munali Suns (2nd title) (2025–26)
- Most championships: Matero Magic (12 titles)

The Zambia Basketball League is the first tier basketball league of Zambia. The league consists of two regions of 10 teams each. The top tier leagues are run by the Midlands Basketball Association (MBA) and Copperbelt Basketball Association (CBA). It is organised by the Zambia Basketball Federation (ZBF). In the past, the league was sponsored by Sprite and was named the Sprite ZBA.

The National champions of the league are able to play in the qualifying rounds of the Basketball Africa League (BAL). Matero Magic is the most successful team in league history with twelve national championships.

== Teams ==
- Matero Magic
- UNZA Pacers
- Munali Suns
- Lusaka City Council Looters
- Hawks
- Green Buffaloes
- Bulldogs
- Green Eagles
- Napsa Hurricanes
- Nishati Denvers

== Champions ==
Year	Champions	Runners-up	Score	Ref.
2003	Heroes Play United			
2004	Matero Magic			
2012–13	UNZA Pacers	Napsa Hurricanes	2–1	
2013	Matero Magic			
2013–14				
2014–15	Matero Magic	UNZA Pacers	3–1	
2015–16	Matero Magic	Green Buffaloes	3–1	
2016–17				
2017–18	UNZA Pacers			
2018–19				
2019–20	Matero Magic	Munali Suns	3–2	
2021–22	Matero Magic	Napsa Hurricanes	2–1	
2022–23	Munali Suns	Matero Warriors	2–1	
2023–24	Matero Magic	Green Buffaloes	2–1	
2024–25	Matero Magic	Green Buffaloes	2–0	
2025–26	Munali Suns	Matero Magic	2–1	

=== Titles by team ===
Team	Titles	Years won
Matero Magic	12	2004, 2013, 2015, 2016, 2020, 2022, 2023, 2024, 2025
Munali Suns	2	2023, 2026
UNZA Pacers	2	2013, 2018
Heroes Play United	1	2003

== Most Valuable Player ==
Year	Player	Team
2013	Joshua Kupa	UNZA Pacers
2023	Saul Phiri	Matero Magic
