= Pazi BBC =

- League: National Basketball League; Regional Basketball Association
- Location: Dar es Salaam, Tanzania
- Head coach: Henry Mwinuka
- Championships: 1 NBL; 1 RBA

Pazi Basketball Club, also known simply as Pazi, is a Tanzanian basketball club based in Dar es Salaam. The team plays in the Regional Basketball Association (RBA) and the National Basketball League.

Pazi won their first-ever national league title in 2022, and as such represented Tanzania in the Road to BAL 2024 tournament. They hosted the first round in Dar es Salaam, and behind players Dhieu Deing, Hasheem Thabeet and Baraka Athumani, Pazi advanced to the Elite 16.

== Honours ==
National Basketball League

- Champions (1): 2022

Regional Basketball Association (RBA)

- Champions (1): 2022

== Players ==
=== Current roster ===
The following roster played for Pazi in the 2024 BAL qualification tournaments.

Note: Flags indicate national team eligibility at FIBA-sanctioned events. Players may hold other non-FIBA nationalities not displayed.

Pazi BBC roster
Players
Coaches

Pos.	No.	Nat.	Name	Ht.	Age
PG	0	(France)	Rucklin, Louis	1.84 m (6 ft 0 in)	27 – 20 January 1999
SG	1	(Tanzania)	Athumani, Baraka	1.78 m (5 ft 10 in)	32 – 14 February 1994
SG	3	(South Sudan)	Deing, Dhieu	1.92 m (6 ft 4 in)	24 – 28 August 2001
	4	(Tanzania)	Abdallah, Ally Faraji	2.00 m (6 ft 7 in)	24 – 10 July 2001
C	6	(Tanzania)	Mbegu, Haji Rashid	2.06 m (6 ft 9 in)	28 – 6 May 1998
	7	(Gabon)	Tsegakele, Anthony		27 – 1 October 1998
	8	(Tanzania)	Lugora, Erick		35 – 18 August 1990
SF	12	(Burundi)	Ndikumana, Landry	1.98 m (6 ft 6 in)	31 – 14 February 1995
	16	(Tanzania)	Chuma, Fadhili		30 – 19 June 1995
	22	(Tanzania)	Buruhani, Swalehe		23 – 28 May 2002
C	34	(Tanzania)	Thabeet, Hasheem	2.21 m (7 ft 3 in)	39 – 16 February 1987
	35	(Tanzania)	Kijogoo, Mwalimu		37 – 4 April 1989

Head coach

- (Tanzania) Henry Mwinuka

Assistant coach(es)

- (Tanzania) Mohamed Bakari

Legend

- (C) Team captain
- Injured

- Roster
Updated: 22 October 2023
