= KBA Premier League =

Namibian basketball league

- Organising body: Khomas Basketball Association
- Country: Namibia
- Region: Khomas Region
- Number of teams: 19
- Current champions: UNAM Wolves (2022 Independence Cup)

The Khomas Basketball Association (KBA) Premier League is a basketball league for men's teams in the Khomas Region in Namibia. It is the country's only competitive basketball league and is thus seen as the national top level. The league is organised by the Khomas Basketball Association (KBA), which is located in Windhoek. Because of its high level of competition, teams from other regions have also played in the league, and the Namibian Basketball Federation (NBF) has given the association a mandate to host a national tournament and form a national team.

The association also hosts an annual Independence Cup, which is held on Namibia's Independence Day.

The winners of each season are eligible to represent Namibia in the Road to BAL.

== Format ==
The KBA Premier League starts with a preliminary round in which the teams play in a round-robin format. This is followed by the playoffs, with a best-of-five series in the semi-finals and best-of-seven series in the finals.

== Champions ==
- 2004: MTC Suns
- 2008: Tomahawks
- 2014: UNAM Rebels
- 2015: Lions
- 2018: Lions
- 2019: Blackswords
- 2022 Independence Cup: UNAM Wolves

== Finals ==
Season	Champions	Runners-up	Finals score	Ref.
2014	UNAM Rebels	Lions	90-80	
2019	Blackswords			
2022 Independence Cup	UNAM Wolves			
