= Ellis Park Arena =

Indoor stadium in Johannesburg, South Africa

- Interactive map of Ellis Park Arena
- Former names: Standard Bank Arena (1990–2008)
- Address: Bertrams Road; Doornfontein, Johannesburg, Gauteng; 2094 South Africa
- Coordinates: 26.1960512°S 28.0649668°E
- Owner: Ellis Park World of Sport
- Capacity: 6,300

Construction
- Built: Concor
- Opened: 1990
- Renovated: 2010

Website
- Arena Information

The Ellis Park Arena (formerly Standard Bank Arena and often acknowledged as Ellis Park Indoor Arena) is an indoor sporting arena located in Johannesburg, South Africa. The capacity of the arena is 5,000 people. A large number of sports events and concerts have occurred in this arena.

== Facilities ==
The Ellis Park Arena has 4,300 permanent seats which give all spectators an unobstructed view. In addition there are retractable seats on the east and west sides on the floor for an additional 850 spectators. Chairs can also be placed on the floor up to a maximum of 1,200 making the capacity of the Arena approximately 6,300. There is a covered walkway around the Arena which includes a theatre style foyer, a fully licensed bar facility, as well as refreshment outlets and entertainment areas.

Several suites in the Ellis Park Arena have a cocktail environment and can be used for private functions. While the Donald Ross Room accommodates 100 people, the VIP suite and Media Centre each cater for 200 people. The main foyer can accommodate up to 1,000 people.

== Events ==
The arena hosted NBA Africa Game 2015 on 1 August, the first NBA-sanctioned game in Africa. It was contested between NBA players that were born in Africa or had parents born in the continent and players from the rest of the world. The Legends Cup of the Legends Football League was originally supposed to be hosted here in 2019; instead, it will be played at the Accesso ShoWare Center in Kent, Washington, United States.

== See also ==
- List of indoor arenas in South Africa
