= Burundian Basketball Championship =

- Organising body: FEBUBA
- Founded: 2022 (as Viva Basketball League)
- Country: Burundi
- Number of teams: 12
- Level on pyramid: 1
- International cup: Basketball Africa League (BAL)
- Current champions: Urunani (18th title) (2026)
- Most championships: Urunani (18 titles)

The Burundian Basketball Championship (in French: Championnat National du Burundi), also known as the Amstel Basketball League and previously Viva Basketball League for sponsorship reasons, is a semi-professional basketball league that is the highest level of the sport in Burundi. The league is organised by the Fédération de Basketball du Burundi (FEBABU).

In 2022, the league signed a 4-year sponsorship contract with malt drink producer Viva; the winners of the league win a prize money of 10 million FBu (approximately $4,800).

== Current teams ==
The following 12 teams played in the 2025 season.

Team	City	Founded
Aigle Noir	Makamba	2009
Dynamo	Bujumbura	1968
Gymkhana	Bujumbura	1982
Kern	Bujumbura	
Les Hippos	Bujumbura	
Lion Team	Bujumbura	
Muzinga	Bujumbura	
New Star	Bujumbura	2002
Remesha	Bujumbura	
Tigers		
Urunani	Bujumbura	1979
Young Eagles	Gitega	

== List of winners ==
- 2012: Urunani
- 2013: Urunani
- 2014: Urunani
- 2015:
- 2016: Dynamo
- 2017:
- 2018: New Star
- 2019: Dynamo
- 2021: New Star
- 2022: Urunani
- 2023: Dynamo
- 2024: Urunani
- 2025: Dynamo
- 2026: Urunani

== Finals ==
=== National Championship ===
Season	Champions	Runners-up	Score	MVP	Ref.
2010	Urunani				
2011					
2012	Urunani	New Star	69–59	Elvis Gafyisi	
2013	Urunani	New Star		–	
2014	Urunani	New Star	50–54	Willy Nijimbere	
2015	Urunani				
2016	Dynamo	Imbeya	72–59	–	
2017					
2018	New Star	Gymkhana		–	
2019	Dynamo	Urunani	76–54	Jean Hakizimana	
2021	New Star	Muzinga Ngozi	74–61	–	

=== Viva Basketball League (2022–present) ===
Season	Champions	Runners-up	Finals score	MVP	Winning coach	Ref.
2022	Urunani	New Star	76–66	–	Aron Kagabo	
2023	Dynamo	Urunani	4–2	–	Olivier Ndayiragije	
2024	Urunani	Dynamo	4–3	Jean Jacques Boissy	Olivier Ndayiragije	
2025	Dynamo	Urunani	4–3	Etienne Tametong	Julien Chaignot	
2026	Urunani	Dynamo	4–3	Romis Bujeje	Elvis Hakizimana	

== In international competitions ==
=== FIBA Africa Clubs Champions Cup ===
Urunani is the only Burundian team to have played in the FIBA Africa Club Champions Cup, the top-tier competition on the African continent. They played in the 2011 tournament, and in the 2013 tournament.

=== BAL ===
Dynamo qualified successfully for the 2024 season of the Basketball Africa League (BAL). Dynamo defeated the Malagasy team COSPN 79–78 in the third place game, became the first team from Burundi to play in the league, and the first Elite 16 wild card to advance to the main tournament.

In the opening day game between Dynamo and South Africa's Cape Town Tigers, the Burundian side taped off the logo of league sponsor Visit Rwanda. Political tensions between the two border nations Burundi and Rwanda had been rising, as Burundi has accused Rwanda of supporting the RED-Tabara rebel militia in the country. Dynamo forfeited their second game against FUS Rabat on 10 March, with the BAL citing "refusing to comply with the league’s rules governing jersey and uniform requirements" as the reason why. Following Dynamo's second forfeit on 12 March, the team was automatically withdrawn from the group as per FIBA rules. Dynamo players Bryton Hobbs and Makhtar Gueye stated that the Burundian government had prohibited the team to wear the logo and ordered the club to forfeit its games if necessary.

Season	Representative	Road to BAL					Main competition			
Season	Representative	W	L	W%	Result	Qualified	W	L	W%	Result
2021	Dynamo	1	3	.250	First Round	No	DNQ			
2022	New Star	4	2	.667	Fourth Place	No	DNQ			
2023	Urunani	5	3	.625	Fourth Place	No	DNQ			
2024	Dynamo	4	4	.500	(bronze) Third Place	Yes	0	1	.000	Disqualified
2025	Urunani	8	1	.889	(bronze) Third Place	No	DNQ			
Total		22	13	.629			0	1	.000	

== Heroes Cup ==
The Heroes Cup (in French: Coupe des Heros) is a cup competition that is held to celebrate the Independence of Burundi and to commemorate its national heroes. It was established in 2017, and is organised by the non-profit organization Fondation Pax-Burundi. Teams from the first championship participate, as well as teams from the B Division.

Edition	Season	Champions	Runners-up	Score	MVP	Ref.
1	2017	Dynamo	Muzinga	53–48	–	
2	2018	Dynamo (2)	Urunani	71–34	–	
3	2019	Urunani	Gymkana	60–55	–	
4	2020	Dynamo (3)	Muzinga Ngozi	72–62	Amani Rushoza	
5	2021	Urunani (2)	Dynamo		N/A	
6	2022	Urunani (3)	Dynamo	82–81	N/A	
7	2023	Dynamo (4)	Urunani	52–45	N/A	
8	2024				N/A	
9	2025	Dynamo (5)	Remesha	78–59	N/A	
