= Dynamo BBC =

Burundian basketball club

Dynamo
- Leagues: BAL; Viva Basketball League; ACBAB
- Founded: 1968; 57 years ago
- History: Dynamo BBC (1968–present)
- Location: Bujumbura, Burundi
- Team colors: Green, silver, white
- Main sponsor: Bekra Pharma, Ltd.
- Head coach: Olivier Ndayiragije
- Championships: 4 (2016, 2018, 2023, 2025)
- Cup titles: 4 (2017, 2018, 2020, 2023)
| Home | Away |

Dynamo Basketball Club, also known simply as Dynamo, is a basketball club based in Bujumbura, Burundi. Established in 1968, the team competes in both the Viva Basketball League and the Bujumbura Amateurs Basketball Club Association (ACBAB).

Dynamo has won the Burundian championship four times, the last time being in 2025. In the 2024 season, Dynamo played in the Basketball Africa League (BAL) as the first team from Burundi to play in the league. After winning their opening game, the team was forced to withdraw after it refused to wear a logo advertising Rwanda, over political reasons.

== History ==
Dynamo Basketball Club was established and founded in 1968.

On 25 September 2016, Dynamo won its first-ever Burundian National Championship.

In the 2017–18 season, Dynamo had a historically successful season, winning the ACBAB title, Heroes' Cup, and President's Cup. Their Bujumbura title was their first since 20 years earlier, in 1998.

The team captured another ACBAB championship in 2019. Dynamo also qualified for the 2020 BAL Qualifying Tournaments.

=== Recent years ===
Dynamo won their fourth national championship in 2023. They then played in the 2024 BAL qualification tournament, and on 26 November 2023 they clinched their participation in the 2024 season of the Basketball Africa League (BAL). Dynamo defeated the Malagasy team COSPN 79–78 in the third place game, became the first team from Burundi to play in the league, and the first Elite 16 wild card to advance to the main tournament.

In the opening day game between Dynamo and South Africa's Cape Town Tigers, the Burundian side taped off the logo of league sponsor Visit Rwanda. Political tensions between the two border nations Burundi and Rwanda had been rising, as Burundi has accused Rwanda of supporting the RED-Tabara rebel militia in the country. Dynamo forfeited their second game against FUS Rabat on 10 March, with the BAL citing "refusing to comply with the league’s rules governing jersey and uniform requirements" as the reason why. Following Dynamo's second forfeit on 12 March, the team was automatically withdrawn from the group as per FIBA rules. Dynamo players Bryton Hobbs and Makhtar Gueye stated that the Burundian government had prohibited the team to wear the logo and ordered the club to forfeit its games if necessary. The following year, Les Verts were unable to play in the BAL qualifiers, as they lost to Urunani in the finals.

In the 2025 season, Dynamo defeated Urunani in seven games in the finals to win the national championship for a fourth time.

== Honours ==
Burundian National Championship

- Champions (3): 2016, 2019, 2023, 2025

Heroes' Cup

- Winners (4): 2017, 2018, 2020, 2023

President's Cup

- Champions (1): 2018

ACBAB

- Champions (3): 1998, 2018, 2019

== In African competitions ==
Road to BAL (2 appearances)

2020 – First round
2024 – Third Place

== Players ==
=== 2024 BAL season roster ===
The following was Dynamo's roster in the 2024 BAL season in March 2024.

Note: Flags indicate national team eligibility at FIBA-sanctioned events. Players may hold other non-FIBA nationalities not displayed.

Dynamo roster
Players
Coaches

| Pos. | No. | Nat. | Name | Ht. | Age |
|---|---|---|---|---|---|
| PG | 0 | (Burundi) | Nijimbere, Guibert | 1.89 m (6 ft 2 in) | 30 – 1 January 1995 |
| PG | 1 | (United States) | Hobbs, Bryton (C) | 1.83 m (6 ft 0 in) | 34 – 14 November 1991 |
| SG | 2 | (South Sudan) | Deng, Dhieu | 1.95 m (6 ft 5 in) | 24 – 28 August 2001 |
| PF | 5 | (Burundi) | Bitigirimbango, Derrick | 2.00 m (6 ft 7 in) | 27 – 19 January 1998 |
| G/F | 7 | (Senegal) | Gueye, Makhtar | 2.08 m (6 ft 10 in) | 28 – 7 January 1997 |
| SG | 10 | (Burundi) | Ndikuriyo, Richard | 1.89 m (6 ft 2 in) | 28 – 15 May 1997 |
| SG | 11 | (Burundi) | Alvin, Ninziza | 1.86 m (6 ft 1 in) | 34 – 8 June 1991 |
| SF | 12 | (Burundi) | Bujeje, Romis | 1.98 m (6 ft 6 in) | 26 – 25 November 1998 |
| SF | 14 | (Senegal) | Camara, Mohamed | 2.03 m (6 ft 8 in) | 20 – 1 April 2005 |
| PF | 24 | (Burundi) | Karabona, Clement | 2.03 m (6 ft 8 in) | 24 – 10 July 2001 |
| C | 28 | (United Kingdom) | Williams, Morakinyo | 2.10 m (6 ft 11 in) | 27 – 29 August 1998 |
| C | 50 | (Nigeria) | Otobo, Israel | 2.00 m (6 ft 7 in) | 21 – 31 May 2004 |

Head coach

- (France) Julien Chaignot

Assistant coach(es)

- (Burundi) Olivier Ndayiragije
- (Burundi) Joris Ndumutima

Legend

- (C) Team captain
- Injured

- Roster
Updated: 15 March 2024
