= 2027 BAL qualification =

Qualifying games for the 2027 BAL season

- Association: FIBA Africa
- League: Road to BAL
- Sport: Basketball
- Duration: 1 October – 29 November 2026
- Teams: 26

West Division
- Division champions: (Libya) Al-Ittihad Tripoli (1st division title)
- Top scorer: Keron DeShields (Al-Ittihad Tripoli)

East Division

Seasons
- ← 2026 2028 →

The qualification for the 2027 BAL season, also known as Road to BAL 2027, is the qualifying tournaments for the seventh season of the Basketball Africa League (BAL). The tournaments are organised by FIBA Africa.

The competition began on 1 October and will end on 29 November 2026.

== Teams ==
The official list of teams were announced by FIBA on 1 October 2026.

=== West Division ===
Association	Team	Qualification method	Ref.
Entered in Elite 16
Ivory Coast	JCA Kings	2026 Ligue d'Or champions	
Entered in first round
Algeria	NB Staouéli	2025–26 Algerian Basketball Championship	
Benin	Energie BBC	2026 Benin Basketball Super League champions	
Cameroon	FAP	2026 Cameroonian Basketball Cup winners	
Cape Verde	Kriol Star		
Congo	Avenir du Rail	2026 Congo National Championship	
(Democratic Republic of the Congo) DR Congo	ASB Onatra	2026 Coupe du Congo winners	
Gabon	Espoir BC	2026 Gabonese Basketball Cup champions	
Ghana	Spintex Knights	2026 Accra Basketball League champions	
Guinea	Nabaya Sofas	2026 Guinea Ligue 1 champions	
Mali	Stade Malien	2025–26 Mali Ligue 1 champions	
Liberia	NPA Pythons	2025–26 Liberia Basketball Association champions	
Libya	Al-Ittihad Tripoli	2025–26 Libyan Division I Basketball League	

=== East Division ===
Association	Team	Qualification method	Ref.
Entered in Elite 16
Kenya	Nairobi City Thunder	2025–26 KBF Premier League champions	
Tanzania	Dar City	2025 National Basketball League champions	
Entered in first round
Botswana	Dolphins	2026 Botswana Basketball League champions	
Burundi	Urunani	2026 Burundian Basketball Championship	
Comoros	Ushindzi	2026 Comoros Basketball Championship	
Madagascar	COSPN	2026 N1A champions	
Malawi	Bravehearts	2025–26 BASMAL National Championship champions	
Mozambique	Ferroviário da Beira	2026 Liga Moçambicana de Basquetebol champions	
South Africa	Soweto Panthers	2026 South African National Basketball Championship champions	
South Sudan	Patriots	2026 CESBA champions	
Uganda	Namuwongo Blazers	2026 NBL Uganda champions	
Zambia	Munali Suns	2025–26 Zambia Basketball League champions	
Zimbabwe	Harare Kings	2026 BUZ National Championship champions	

== First round ==
The first round group stage began on 21 October and ended on 31 October. The venues for each group were announced on 1 October 2026.

=== West Division ===
==== Group A ====
Venue: Tripoli, Libya

Pos	Team	Pld	W	L	PF	PA	PD	Pts	Qualification
1	(Libya) Al-Ittihad Tripoli (H)	3	3	0	253	202	+51	6	Advance to Elite 16
2	(Algeria) NB Staouéli	3	2	1	245	239	+6	5	Advance to Elite 16
3	(Mali) Stade Malien	3	1	2	164	166	−2	4	Advance to Elite 16
4	(Cape Verde) Kriol Star	3	0	3	135	190	−55	3	

Source: FIBA
(H) Hosts

==== Group B ====
Venue: Tripoli, Libya

Pos	Team	Pld	W	L	PF	PA	PD	Pts	Qualification
1	(Ghana) Spintex Knights	3	3	0	276	227	+49	6	Advance to Elite 16
2	(Guinea) Nabaya Sofas	3	2	1	248	221	+27	5	Advance to Elite 16
3	(Benin) Energie BBC	3	1	2	220	241	−21	4	
4	(Liberia) NPA Pythons	3	0	3	203	258	−55	3	

Source: FIBA

==== Group C ====
Venue: Brazzaville, Republic of Congo

Pos	Team	Pld	W	L	PF	PA	PD	Pts	Qualification
1	(Republic of the Congo) Avenir du Rail (H)	3	3	0	209	194	+15	6	Advance to Elite 16
2	(Gabon) Espoir BC	3	1	2	174	174	0	4	Advance to Elite 16
3	(Democratic Republic of the Congo) ASB Onatra	3	1	2	205	212	−7	4	
4	(Cameroon) FAP	3	1	2	173	181	−8	4	

Source: FIBA
(H) Hosts

==== Ranking of third-placed teams ====
Pos	Team	Pld	W	L	PF	PA	PD	Pts	Qualification
1	(Mali) Stade Malien	3	1	2	164	166	−2	4	Advance to Elite 16
2	(Democratic Republic of the Congo) ASB Onatra	3	1	2	205	212	−7	4	Eliminated
3	(Benin) Energie BBC	3	1	2	220	241	−21	4	Eliminated

Source: FIBA

=== East Division ===
==== Group D ====
Venue: Hoima, Uganda

Pos	Team	Pld	W	L	PF	PA	PD	Pts	Qualification
1	(Burundi) Urunani	4	4	0	375	285	+90	8	Advance to Elite 16
2	(Uganda) Namuwongo Blazers (H)	4	3	1	372	263	+109	7	Advance to Elite 16
3	(South Sudan) Patriots	4	2	2	347	309	+38	6	Advance to Elite 16
4	(Madagascar) COSPN	4	1	3	292	336	−44	5	
5	(Comoros) Ushindzi	4	0	4	219	412	−193	4	

Source: FIBA
(H) Hosts

==== Group E ====
Venue: Lusaka, Zambia

Pos	Team	Pld	W	L	PF	PA	PD	Pts	Qualification
1	(Zambia) Munali Suns (H)	5	5	0	412	336	+76	10	Advance to Elite 16
2	(Mozambique) Ferroviário da Beira	5	4	1	485	370	+115	9	Advance to Elite 16
3	(Botswana) Dolphins	5	3	2	342	398	−56	8	Advance to Elite 16
4	(Malawi) Bravehearts	5	2	3	365	397	−32	7	
5	(Zimbabwe) Harare Kings	5	1	4	334	356	−22	6	
6	(South Africa) Soweto Panthers	5	0	5	300	381	−81	5	

Source: FIBA
(H) Hosts

== Elite 16 ==
The Elite 16 began on 9 November and ended on 29 November.

=== West Division ===
Venue: Abidjan, Ivory Coast

==== Group A ====
Pos	Team	Pld	W	L	PF	PA	PD	Pts	Qualification
1	(Ivory Coast) JCA Kings (H)	3	3	0	241	208	+33	6	Advance to final round
2	(Mali) Stade Malien	3	2	1	252	246	+6	5	Advance to final round
3	(Republic of the Congo) Avenir du Rail	3	1	2	233	234	−1	4	
4	(Ghana) Spintex Knights	3	0	3	234	272	−38	3	

Source: FIBA
(H) Hosts

==== Group B ====
Pos	Team	Pld	W	L	PF	PA	PD	Pts	Qualification
1	(Libya) Al-Ittihad Tripoli	3	3	0	257	187	+70	6	Advance to final round
2	(Algeria) NB Staouéli	3	2	1	208	211	−3	5	Advance to final round
3	(Gabon) Espoir BC	3	1	2	191	217	−26	4	
4	(Guinea) Nabaya Sofas	3	0	3	195	236	−41	3	

Source: FIBA

==== Final round ====
Semi-finals
(Ivory Coast) JCA Kings	76
(Algeria) NB Staouéli	63
(Libya) Al-Ittihad Tripoli	90
(Mali) Stade Malien	71

Final
(Ivory Coast) JCA Kings	80
(Libya) Al-Ittihad Tripoli	92
Third place game
(Algeria) NB Staouéli	60
(Mali) Stade Malien	82

===== Semi-finals =====
14 Nov 2025	JCA Kings (Ivory Coast)	76–63	(Algeria) NB Staouéli	Abidjan, Ivory Coast
19:00 (GMT +0)	Scoring by quarter: 21–18, 18–19, 16–9, 21–17
	Pts: Keita 16; Rebs: Gbane 8 Asts: Keita 6	Boxscore	Pts: Harat 24; Rebs: Harat 8 Asts: Fedala, Harat 3	Arena: Palais des Sports de Treichville; Attendance: 2,000; Referees: Amir Taboubi, Oumar Sy, Mame Dieye

14 Nov 2025	Al-Ittihad Tripoli (Libya)	90–71	(Mali) Stade Malien	Abidjan, Ivory Coast
16:30 (GMT +0)	Scoring by quarter: 22–21, 12–8, 31–16, 25–26
	Pts: DeShields 25; Rebs: Almeida 14; Asts: Sadi 9	Boxscore	Pts: Amayo, Coulibaly 20; Rebs: Amayo 11; Asts: Amayo 4	Arena: Palais des Sports de Treichville; Referees: Guy Sani, Imad Driouach, Moustafa Salem

===== Third place game =====
15 Nov 2025	NB Staouéli (Algeria)	60–82	(Mali) Stade Malien	Abidjan, Ivory Coast
16:30 (GMT +0)	Scoring by quarter: 16–18, 11–14, 18–19, 15–31
	Pts: Harat 22; Rebs: Bensalah 11; Asts: Boussad, Harat 3	Boxscore	Pts: Amayo 26; Rebs: Coulibaly 14; Asts: Coulibaly 5	Arena: Palais des Sports de Treichville; Attendance: 100; Referees: Hassane Kamate, Mohamed Habib Gharbi, Boubacar Sakho

===== Final =====
15 Nov 2025	JCA Kings (Ivory Coast)	80–92	(Libya) Al-Ittihad Tripoli	Abidjan, Ivory Coast
19:00 (GMT +0)	Scoring by quarter: 10–24, 27–27, 21–20, 22–21
	Pts: Keita 15; Rebs: L. Konate 8 Asts: B. Konate, Boye 5	Boxscore	Pts: Romero 21; Rebs: Romero 11; Asts: Sadi, DeShields 7	Arena: Palais des Sports de Treichville; Attendance: 2,500; Referees: Amir Taboubi, Moustafa Salem, Mame Dieye

=== East Division ===
Venue: Nairobi, Kenya

==== Group A ====
Pos	Team	Pld	W	L	PF	PA	PD	Pts	Qualification
1	(Kenya) Nairobi City Thunder (H)	0	0	0	0	0	0	0	Advance to final round
2	(South Sudan) Patriots	0	0	0	0	0	0	0	Advance to final round
3	(Zambia) Munali Suns	0	0	0	0	0	0	0	
4	(Burundi) Urunani	0	0	0	0	0	0	0	

First match(es) will be played: 23 November 2026. Source: FIBA
(H) Hosts

==== Group B ====
Pos	Team	Pld	W	L	PF	PA	PD	Pts	Qualification
1	(Tanzania) Dar City	0	0	0	0	0	0	0	Advance to final round
2	(Botswana) Dolphins	0	0	0	0	0	0	0	Advance to final round
3	(Uganda) Namuwongo Blazers	0	0	0	0	0	0	0	
4	(Mozambique) Ferroviário da Beira	0	0	0	0	0	0	0	

First match(es) will be played: 23 November 2026. Source: FIBA

==== Final round ====
Semi-finals

Final
Third place game

===== Semi-finals =====
TBD (To be determined)	vs.	(To be determined) TBD	Nairobi, Kenya
Scoring by quarter: –, –, –, –
			Arena: Kasarani Indoor Arena

TBD (To be determined)	vs.	(To be determined) TBD	Nairobi, Kenya
Scoring by quarter: –, –, –, –
			Arena: Kasarani Indoor Arena

===== Third place game =====
TBD (To be determined)	vs.	(To be determined) TBD	Nairobi, Kenya
Scoring by quarter: –, –, –, –
			Arena: Kasarani Indoor Arena

===== Final =====
TBD (To be determined)	vs.	(To be determined) TBD	Nairobi, Kenya
Scoring by quarter: –, –, –, –
			Arena: Kasarani Indoor Arena
