= 2026–27 NB Staouéli season =

Algerian basketball team season

NB Staouéli
2026–27 season
- President: (Algeria)
- Head coach: (Algeria) Sid Ali Ghrib
- Arena: Salle OMS de Staouéli, Staouéli
- Super Division: pre-season
- Algerian Cup: pre-season
- BAL qualification: WD final round

The 2026–27 season was NB Staouéli's 65th in existence, their 25th consecutive season in the top flight of the Algerian basketball, NB Staouéli participated in the season's editions of the Algerian Cup.

== Overview ==
The 2026-27 basketball season in Algeria will begin on September 11 and 12, 2026, with the resumption of the Super Division, the Algerian Basketball Federation (FABB) announced following a coordination meeting with the clubs held in Algiers. The 14 participating teams are: WO Boufarik, NB Staouéli, CS Tlemcen, Rouiba CB, MC Alger, USM Alger, USM Blida, CR Béni Saf, CSC Djasr Kasentina, CRB Dar Beida, US Sétif, NA Hussein Dey, CM Oran and WRB El Eulma. The meeting between the FABB and club representatives addressed several issues related to the new season, with the aim of establishing a common vision and improving the organization and competitive level of the national championships. The federation also called on all stakeholders to prioritize the interests of Algerian basketball and continue their efforts to promote the professionalization and development of the sport.

NB Staouéli maintained their position at the top of the Super-Division standings following the third round, sharing first place with MC Alger on six points. The club extended their winning run to three consecutive games after securing a convincing 93–52 victory over CR Beni Saf. Staouéli dominated the encounter to claim their third win in as many matches, consolidating their position at the summit thanks to a superior points difference.

== Players ==
=== Super Division roster ===
Note: Flags indicate national team eligibility at FIBA-sanctioned events. Players may hold other non-FIBA nationalities not displayed.

NB Staouéli roster
Players
Coaches

Pos.	No.	Nat.	Name	Ht.	Wt.	Age
PG	4	(Algeria)	Boussad, Mohamed	1.86 m (6 ft 1 in)	76 kg (168 lb)	27 – 26 November 1998
G	5	(Algeria)	Slimani, Hamoud	1.96 m (6 ft 5 in)	89 kg (196 lb)	31 – 25 December 1994
G/F	6	(Algeria)	Sedoud, Chakib	1.75 m (5 ft 9 in)	68 kg (150 lb)	22 – 15 October 2004
SF	6	(Algeria)	Tifoura, Zine-Eddine	1.65 m (5 ft 5 in)	65 kg (143 lb)	19 – 20 June 2007
PF	7	(Algeria)	Bensalah, Mohamed Amine	2.00 m (6 ft 7 in)	95 kg (209 lb)	24 – 1 January 2002
PF	8	(Algeria)	Yahya, Merouane	1.65 m (5 ft 5 in)	65 kg (143 lb)	23 – 19 March 2003
SF	9	(Algeria)	Aouizet, Louai Mohamed
SG	9	(Algeria)	Ghrib, Sid Ali	1.88 m (6 ft 2 in)	89 kg (196 lb)	41 – 1 June 1985
G	10	(Algeria)	Benrighi, Abderraouf	2.02 m (6 ft 8 in)	87 kg (192 lb)	28 – 27 November 1997
C	11	(Algeria)	Maatoub, Zakaria	2.07 m (6 ft 9 in)	105 kg (231 lb)	29 – 24 October 1997
G/F	12	(Algeria)	Aious, Sami Izedine	1.70 m (5 ft 7 in)	65 kg (143 lb)	21 – 12 October 2005
G	13	(Algeria)	Ouahab, Khaled	2.03 m (6 ft 8 in)	98 kg (216 lb)	38 – 27 July 1988
PG	14	(Algeria)	Fedala, Anis Mohamed	1.85 m (6 ft 1 in)	82 kg (181 lb)	36 – 8 January 1990
PF	15	(Algeria)	Dekakane, Hichem	1.91 m (6 ft 3 in)	96 kg (212 lb)	29 – 11 June 1997

Head coach

- (Algeria) Sid Ali Ghrib

Assistant coach(es)

- (Algeria) Abderrehmane Ziad

Legend

- (C) Team captain
- (I) Import player
- Injured

- Roster
Updated: April 1, 2026

=== BAL season roster ===
Note: Flags indicate national team eligibility at FIBA-sanctioned events. Players may hold other non-FIBA nationalities not displayed.

NB Staouéli roster
Players
Coaches

Pos.	No.	Nat.	Name	Ht.	Wt.	Age
PF	1	(United States)	Manigault, Corey	2.06 m (6 ft 9 in)	102 kg (225 lb)	28 – 20 October 1998
PG	4	(Algeria)	Fedala, Anis Mohamed	1.85 m (6 ft 1 in)	82 kg (181 lb)	36 – 8 January 1990
PF	7	(Algeria)	Bensalah, Mohamed Amine	2.00 m (6 ft 7 in)	95 kg (209 lb)	24 – 1 January 2002
PF	8	(Algeria)	Yahya, Merouane	1.65 m (5 ft 5 in)	65 kg (143 lb)	23 – 19 March 2003
PF	9	(Algeria)	Merahi, Lamouri	1.92 m (6 ft 4 in)	80 kg (176 lb)	31 – 6 October 1995
G	10	(Algeria)	Benrighi, Abderraouf	2.02 m (6 ft 8 in)	87 kg (192 lb)	28 – 27 November 1997
C	11	(Algeria)	Maatoub, Zakaria	2.07 m (6 ft 9 in)	105 kg (231 lb)	29 – 24 October 1997
PF	12	(Algeria)	Hamdini, Abdellah	2.02 m (6 ft 8 in)		34 – 11 January 1992
PG	12	(Central African Republic)	Wegscheider, Kurt-Curry	1.93 m (6 ft 4 in)	90 kg (198 lb)	25 – 30 May 2001
G	13	(Algeria)	Ouahab, Khaled	2.03 m (6 ft 8 in)	98 kg (216 lb)	38 – 27 July 1988
PG	14	(Algeria)	Boussad, Mohamed	1.80 m (5 ft 11 in)		27 – 26 November 1998
G	15	(Algeria)	Dekakane, Hichem	1.90 m (6 ft 3 in)	96 kg (212 lb)	29 – 11 June 1997
PF	19	(Algeria)	Harat, Mohamed	2.00 m (6 ft 7 in)		36 – 9 June 1990
C	26	(Algeria)	Zaim, Mehdi	2.07 m (6 ft 9 in)	98 kg (216 lb)	23 – 1 September 2003

Head coach

- (Algeria) Sid Ali Ghrib

Assistant coach(es)

- (Algeria) Abderrehmane Ziad

Legend

- (C) Team captain
- (I) Import player
- Injured

- Roster
Updated: October 21, 2026

=== Transactions ===
==== In ====
On October 18, 2026, NB Staouéli have strengthened their roster ahead of the upcoming season with the signing of experienced Algerian international Mohamed Harat (36, 1.98 m). A power forward by trade, he is coming off an excellent season with Al Nasr Riyadh in Saudi Arabia, where he posted impressive averages of 18.2 points, 13.2 rebounds, and 4.4 assists per game in 13 appearances.

Date	Pos	Player	Moving from	Fee	Source
29 September 2026	PF	(Algeria) Laamouri Merahi	USM Alger	Free transfer	
29 September 2026	PF	(Algeria) Abdellah Hamdini	(Algeria) WO Boufarik	Free transfer	
29 September 2026	?	(Algeria) Madjed Eddine Gouriri	?	Free transfer	
18 October 2026	PF	(Algeria) Mohamed Harat (Note: They were recruited solely for the 2027 BAL qualification.)	(Saudi Arabia) Al Nasr Riyadh	Free transfer	
6 November 2026	PG	(Central African Republic) Kurt-Curry Wegscheider	(United States) LCU Chaparrals	Free transfer	
6 November 2026	PF	(United States) Corey Manigault	(United States) ?	Free transfer	

== Competitions ==
=== Overview ===
Competition	First match	Last match	Starting round	Final position	Record							
Competition	First match	Last match	Starting round	Final position	Pld	W	D	L	PF	PA	PD	Win %
Super Division	12 September 2026	To be confirmed	Round 1	In Progress	6	6	0	0	442	293	+149	100.00
Algerian Cup	To be confirmed	To be confirmed	In Progress	In Progress	0	0	0	0	0	0	+0	—
2027 BAL qualification	21 October 2026	15 November 2025	First round	Final round	8	4	0	4	576	608	−32	50.00
Total					14	10	0	4	1,018	901	+117	71.43

Last updated: November 15, 2026
Source: Competitions

=== Super Division ===
==== League table ====
Pos	Team	Pld	W	L	GF	GA	GD	Pts	
1	NB Staouéli	2	2	0	158	78	+80	4	Advance to play-off
2	WO Boufarik	2	2	0	148	114	+34	4	Advance to play-off
3	MC Alger	2	2	0	128	104	+24	4	Advance to play-off
4	NA Hussein Dey	2	2	0	87	64	+23	4	Advance to play-off
5	USM Alger	2	1	1	144	118	+26	3	Advance to play-off

First match(es) will be played: September 22, 2026. Source: FABB

==== Results summary ====
Overall						Home					Away				
Pld	W	L	PF	PA	PD	W	L	PF	PA	PD	W	L	PF	PA	PD
6	6	0	0	0	0	3	0	0	0	0	3	0	0	0	0

Last updated: October 13, 2026.
Source: Competitive matches

==== Results by round ====
Round	1	2	3	4	5	6	7	8	9	10	11	12	13	14	15	16	17	18	19	20	21	22	23	24	25	26
Ground	H	A	H	A	H	A																				
Result	W	W	W	W	W	W																				
Position	4	1	1	1	1	1																				

Source: Competitive matches
A = Away; H = Home; W = Win; L = Loss; R = Rest

==== Matches ====
All times are local, WAT (UTC+1).

Sep 11, 2026 1	NB Staouéli	84–67	WRB El Eulma	Staouéli
16:00	Scoring by quarter: 22–19, 27–21, 16–13, 19–14
	Pts: Laamouri Merahi 20; Rebs: Mohamed Boussad 6 Asts: Anis Mohamed Fedala 5	Boxscore	Pts: Aymen Hendel 25; Rebs: Aymen Hendel 9 Asts: Ishak Kerour 4	Arena: Salle OMS de Staouéli; Attendance: 50; Referees: Mohamed Marouf, Mouad Harrache, Abderrezak Fouchane

Sep 19, 2026 2	CRB Dar Beida	11–74	NB Staouéli	Dar El Beïda
17:00	Scoring by quarter: 7–46, 4–28, 0–0, 0–0
	Pts: Skander Sfarni 7 Rebs: Nazim Nadir Abdouni 4 Asts: Rayen Benyahia 1	Boxscore	Pts: Abdellah Hamdani 20; Rebs: Abdellah Hamdani 5 Asts: Abderraouf Benrighi 4	Arena: Salle OMS Dar El Beïda; Attendance: 100; Referees: Abderrezak Fouchane, Mohamed Amir Rahali, Mohammed Zahaf

Sep 25, 2026 3	NB Staouéli	93–53	CR Beni Saf	Staouéli
16:30	Scoring by quarter: 25–15, 23–5, 22–13, 23–20
	Pts: Mohamed Boussad 14; Rebs: Hamoud Slimani 8 Asts: Laamouri Merahi 6	Boxscore	Pts: Mohamed Azzi 12; Rebs: Mohamed Azzi 12; Asts: Issam Benarbia 8	Arena: Salle OMS de Staouéli; Attendance: 200; Referees: Adel Kahallou, Farid Amrane, Fateh Ghaib

Oct 2, 2026 4	US Sétif	53–62	NB Staouéli	Sétif
16:30	Scoring by quarter: 12–12, 11–22, 13–15, 17–13
	Pts: Mutomb Mbav 12; Rebs: Mutomb Mbav 17; Asts: Aymen Atallah Bendada 6	Boxscore	Pts: Mohamed Amine Bensalah 15; Rebs: Khaled Ouahab 8 Asts: Four players 2	Arena: Salle 8 Mai 1945; Attendance: 60; Referees: Sofiane Hamada, Mouna Amrouni, Hamid Boubred

Oct 8, 2026 5	NB Staouéli	68–66	USM Blida	Staouéli
18:00	Scoring by quarter: 23–17, 9–12, 22–13, 14–24
	Pts: Hichem Dekakene 20; Rebs: Four players 7 Asts: Hichem Dekakene 3	Boxscore	Pts: Three players 12; Rebs: Abdesslem Dekkiche 6 Asts: Abdesslem Dekkiche 6	Arena: Salle OMS de Staouéli; Attendance: 200; Referees: Adel Kahallou, Anis Bennani, Mohammed Zahaf

Oct 13, 2026 6	CM Oran	43–61	NB Staouéli	Oran
18:00	Scoring by quarter: 11–15, 15–15, 11–14, 6–17
	Pts: Abdeldjalil Filali 10; Rebs: Mounir Khamez 9 Asts: Imad Didi 2	Boxscore	Pts: Abdellah Hamdini 15; Rebs: Khaled Ouahab 7 Asts: Abderraouf Benrighi 4	Attendance: 200; Referees: Boualem Benabi, Fethi Chaib, Sahraoui Emir

Oct 31, 2026 9	NB Staouéli	84–74	Rouiba CB	Staouéli
18:30	Scoring by quarter: 33–26, 18–24, 20–12, 13–12
	Pts: Hamdini 21; Rebs: Merahi 13; Asts: Bensalah, Merahi 5	Boxscore	Pts: Sid Ali Benzaim 21; Rebs: Ryad Lefkir 10; Asts: Ziad Chenieff 5	Arena: Salle OMS de Staouéli; Attendance: 500; Referees: Tahmi Imène, Osmane Sidali, Marouf Mohamed

7	vs.
:	Scoring by quarter: –, –, –, –
	[ Boxscore]

8	vs.
:	Scoring by quarter: –, –, –, –
	[ Boxscore]

10	vs.
:	Scoring by quarter: –, –, –, –
	[ Boxscore]

11	vs.
:	Scoring by quarter: –, –, –, –
	[ Boxscore]

12	vs.
:	Scoring by quarter: –, –, –, –
	[ Boxscore]

13	vs.
:	Scoring by quarter: –, –, –, –
	[ Boxscore]

14	vs.
:	Scoring by quarter: –, –, –, –
	[ Boxscore]

15	vs.
:	Scoring by quarter: –, –, –, –
	[ Boxscore]

16	vs.
:	Scoring by quarter: –, –, –, –
	[ Boxscore]

17	vs.
:	Scoring by quarter: –, –, –, –
	[ Boxscore]

18	vs.
:	Scoring by quarter: –, –, –, –
	[ Boxscore]

19	vs.
:	Scoring by quarter: –, –, –, –
	[ Boxscore]

20	vs.
:	Scoring by quarter: –, –, –, –
	[ Boxscore]

21	vs.
:	Scoring by quarter: –, –, –, –
	[ Boxscore]

22	vs.
:	Scoring by quarter: –, –, –, –
	[ Boxscore]

23	vs.
:	Scoring by quarter: –, –, –, –
	[ Boxscore]

24	vs.
:	Scoring by quarter: –, –, –, –
	[ Boxscore]

25	vs.
:	Scoring by quarter: –, –, –, –
	[ Boxscore]

26	vs.
:	Scoring by quarter: –, –, –, –
	[ Boxscore]

=== 2027 BAL season ===
NB Staouéli is participating in the preliminary qualifying tournament for the 2027 Basketball Africa League (BAL), held in Tripoli, Libya, as part of the Road to BAL competition. This opening phase runs until 25 October 2026 and brings together several African clubs competing for a place in the Elite 16. The Algerian club is competing in Group A of the West Division, alongside Libya's Al Ittihad, Stade Malien, Guinea's Nabaya and Cape Verde's Kriol Star. At the end of this phase, the top two teams in the group qualify for the Elite 16, the next stage of the qualification process.

The final phase of the West Division's Elite 16 is scheduled to take place from 10 to 15 November 2026 in Abidjan, Côte d'Ivoire. Qualifying competitions are also being held in several African cities for the West and East Divisions. At the end of these stages, two teams from each division will qualify for the 2027 season of the Basketball Africa League. NB Staouéli's participation comes amid a strong start to the Algerian league season, with the club sharing the top positions in the Super Division with MC Alger after six rounds. The Algerian Basketball Federation, led by its president, Mehdi Oucif, has expressed its support for the club's delegation ahead of the continental competition.

NB Staouéli qualified for the Elite 16 stage of the West Division qualifiers for the 2027 Basketball Africa League (BAL) after defeating Cape Verdean club Kriol Star 84–69 on 23 October 2026, in the third and final game. Following a defeat to Libya's Al-Ittihad (69–93) and a victory over Stade Malien (92–77), the Algerian club finished the group stage with two consecutive wins. Mohamed Harat led NB Staouéli with 19 points, 11 rebounds and six assists. The West Division's Elite 16 stage is scheduled to take place in Abidjan, Ivory Coast, from 10 to 15 November 2026.

==== First round ====
Venue: Tripoli, Libya

West Division Group A
Pos	Team	Pld	W	L	PF	PA	PD	Pts	Qualification
1	(Libya) Al-Ittihad Tripoli (H)	3	3	0	253	202	+51	6	Advance to Elite 16
2	(Algeria) NB Staouéli	3	2	1	245	239	+6	5	Advance to Elite 16
3	(Mali) Stade Malien	3	1	2	164	166	−2	4	Advance to Elite 16
4	(Cape Verde) Kriol Star	3	0	3	135	190	−55	3	

Source: FIBA
(H) Hosts

21 October 2026 1	Al Ittihad Tripoli (Libya)	93–69	(Algeria) NB Staouéli	Tripoli
18:45 (GMT+2)	Scoring by quarter: 31 – 16, 22 – 11, 17 – 18, 23 – 24
	Pts: DeShields 23; Rebs: Almeida, Deng Deng 10; Asts: Sadi 7	Boxscore	Pts: Harat 16; Rebs: Harat 8 Asts: Fedala 5	Arena: Great Hall; Referees: BOUHABBA, Zouhir (MAR), SEYE, Papa Felix (SEN), ABDOURAHMANE, Bah (GUI)

22 October 2026 2	Stade Malien (Mali)	77–92	(Algeria) NB Staouéli	Tripoli
16:00 (GMT+2)	Scoring by quarter: 22 – 21, 15 – 25, 19 – 24, 21 – 22
	Pts: Fula 24; Rebs: Coulibaly 7 Asts: Amayo 9	Boxscore	Pts: Dekakene 22; Rebs: Zaim 11; Asts: Fedala 7	Arena: Great Hall; Referees: SY, Oumar (MTN), DIOP, Vianney Alvin Jean Marie (CIV), GHARBI, Mohamed Habib (TUN)

23 October 2026 3	NB Staouéli (Algeria)	84–69	(Cape Verde) Kriol Star	Tripoli
16:00 (GMT+2)	Scoring by quarter: 21 – 16, 15 – 15, 24 – 20, 24 – 18
	Pts: Harat 19; Rebs: Matoub 14; Asts: Dekakene, Harat 6	Boxscore	Pts: Brown-Soares 18; Rebs: Brown-Soares 12; Asts: Correia 8	Arena: Great Hall; Referees: SY, Oumar (MTN), HUSSEIN, Mahmoud Gamal (EGY), ABDOURAHMANE, Bah (GUI)

NB Staouéli defeated Kriol Star 84–69, during the West Division group phase of the Road to BAL 2027. The Algerian club controlled the game from start to finish, maintaining the lead throughout the contest. Harat led Staouéli with 19 points, 11 rebounds and six assists, while Zakaria Matoub added 14 points and 14 rebounds.

==== Elite 16 ====
On 6 November 2026, FIBA Africa announced the awarding of two wildcards to Stade Malien of Mali and Patriot Basketball Club of South Sudan, who had finished third in Groups A and D, respectively, during the qualifying rounds. The two clubs thus secured the final places in the 2027 Road to BAL Elite 16. The Elite 16 will be divided into two divisions: the West Division, scheduled to take place in Abidjan, Ivory Coast, from 9 to 15 November 2026, and the East Division, to be held in Nairobi, Kenya, from 23 to 29 November 2026. NB Staouéli, representing Algeria, is among the eight teams qualified for the West Division. The draw for the Elite 16 is scheduled for 6 November 2026.

Venue: Abidjan, Ivory Coast

Elite 16 West Division Group B
Pos	Team	Pld	W	L	PF	PA	PD	Pts	Qualification
1	(Libya) Al-Ittihad Tripoli	3	3	0	257	187	+70	6	Advance to final round
2	(Algeria) NB Staouéli	3	2	1	208	211	−3	5	Advance to final round
3	(Gabon) Espoir BC	3	1	2	191	217	−26	4	
4	(Guinea) Nabaya Sofas	3	0	3	195	236	−41	3	

Source: FIBA

9 November 2026 1	Al Ittihad Tripoli (Libya)	98–59	(Algeria) NB Staouéli	Abidjan
12:00 (GMT+0)	Scoring by quarter: 23 – 12, 32 – 20, 24 – 10, 19 – 17
	Pts: DeShields 17; Rebs: Sadi 9 Asts: Sadi 9	Boxscore	Pts: Bensalah 15; Rebs: Zaim 12; Asts: Fedala 4	Arena: Palais des Sports de Treichville; Referees: Guy Sani (CMR), Moustafa Salem (EGY), Mame Medoune Ndiaye Dieye (SEN)

10 November 2026 2	Espoir Basket Club (Gabon)	59–66	(Algeria) NB Staouéli	Abidjan
12:30 (GMT+0)	Scoring by quarter: 20 – 25, 17 – 10, 13 – 10, 9 – 21
	Pts: Hermann Junior 14; Rebs: Missou Obame 9 Asts: Three players 3	Boxscore	Pts: Bensalah 27; Rebs: Zaim 15; Asts: Fedala 3	Arena: Palais des Sports de Treichville; Attendance: 100; Referees: Oumar Sy (MTN), Hassane Kamate (CIV), Boubacar Sakho (GAM)

12 November 2026 3	NB Staouéli (Algeria)	83–54	(Guinea) Nabaya Sofas	Abidjan
15:00 (GMT+0)	Scoring by quarter: 32 – 18, 14 – 15, 17 – 13, 20 – 18
	Pts: Wegscheider, Manigault 14; Rebs: Bensalah 11; Asts: Wegscheider 5	Boxscore	Pts: Fordham 16; Rebs: Kabinet Kaba 16; Asts: Rotardier, Amouzou 2	Arena: Palais des Sports de Treichville; Referees: Guy Sani (CMR), Mostafa Ahmed (EGY), Afolabi Ikumola (NGR)

===== Semi-finals =====
14 Nov 2026	JCA Kings (Ivory Coast)	76–63	(Algeria) NB Staouéli	Abidjan, Ivory Coast
20:00 (GMT+0)	Scoring by quarter: 21–18, 18–19, 16–9, 21–17
	Pts: Keita 16; Rebs: Gbane 8 Asts: Keita 6	Boxscore	Pts: Harat 24; Rebs: Harat 8 Asts: Fedala, Harat 3	Arena: Palais des Sports de Treichville; Attendance: 2,000; Referees: Amir Taboubi, Oumar Sy, Mame Dieye

===== Third place game =====
15 Nov 2025	NB Staouéli (Algeria)	60–82	(Mali) Stade Malien	Abidjan, Ivory Coast
16:30 (GMT +0)	Scoring by quarter: 16–18, 11–14, 18–19, 15–31
	Pts: Harat 22; Rebs: Bensalah 11; Asts: Boussad, Harat 3	Boxscore	Pts: Amayo 26; Rebs: Coulibaly 14; Asts: Coulibaly 5	Arena: Palais des Sports de Treichville; Attendance: 100; Referees: Hassane Kamate, Mohamed Habib Gharbi, Boubacar Sakho

== Statistics ==
=== Super Division ===
As of 14 August 2026

Legend
GP	Games played	GS	Games started	MPG	Minutes per game
FG%	Field-goal percentage	3P%	3-point field-goal percentage	FT%	Free-throw percentage
RPG	Rebounds per game	APG	Assists per game	SPG	Steals per game
BPG	Blocks per game	PPG	Points per game

=== Algerian Cup ===
As of 17 August 2026

=== BAL qualification ===
As of 15 November 2026

Player	GP	GS	MPG	2FG%	3FG%	FT%	RPG	APG	SPG	BPG	PPG
(United States) Corey Manigault	5	0	13:03	42.9 %	20.0 %	62.5 %	3.6	0.4	0.4	0.2	5.8
(Algeria) Anis Mohamed Fedala	7	0	20:05	50.0 %	27.3 %	53.8 %	2.9	3.7	1.3	0.1	2.9
(Algeria) Mohammed Amine Bensalah	8	0	27:01	44.1 %	14.8 %	73.8 %	6.8	1.5	1.3	0.6	12.9
(Algeria) Marouane Yahya	2	0	09:00	100 %	0 %	100 %	1.5	0.5	0.0	0.0	3.0
(Algeria) Lamouri Merahi	8	0	17:00	42.1 %	0 %	50.0 %	2.9	1.1	0.5	0.3	4.3
(Algeria) Abderraouf Benrighi	4	0	07:05	27.3 %	0 %	0 %	1.5	0.3	0.5	0.0	1.5
(Algeria) Zakaria Matoub	6	0	12:08	44.4 %	0 %	100 %	4.8	0.3	0.5	0.7	4.8
(Central African Republic) Kurt-Curry Wegscheider	4	0	22:02	52 %	8.3 %	54.2 %	2.3	2.0	1.0	0.0	10.5
(Algeria) Abdellah Hamdini	3	0	20:06	57.1 %	33.3 %	80 %	2.0	0.3	0.7	0.0	12.7
(Algeria) Khaled Ouahab	6	0	07:05	50 %	66.7 %	33.3 %	2.7	0.3	0.3	0.0	3.5
(Algeria) Mohamed Boussad	8	0	26:01	20 %	8 %	83.3 %	3.6	1.9	1.4	0.0	3.0
(Algeria) Hichem Dekakene	8	0	23:03	46 %	22.7 %	53.3 %	3.9	2.3	0.6	0.0	11.1
(Algeria) Mohamed Harat	6	0	25:09	61.8 %	37.5 %	67.6 %	7.8	2.5	1.5	0.2	16.7
(Algeria) Mahdi Zaim	7	0	23:07	40 %	0 %	60 %	8.4	0.1	1.0	2.7	5.0
TOTAL				46 %	19.4 %	65.2 %	49.5	14.1	8.8	4.1	72

Source: FIBA Basketball
