= 2024 Ligue d'Or season =

- League: Ivorian Basketball Championship
- Duration: 2 March 2024 – June 2024
- Number of teams: 12
- Top seed: ABC Fighters
- Season MVP: James Westbrook (ABC)
- Finals champions: ABC Fighters (22nd title)
- Runners-up: SOA

Seasons
- ← 2023 2025 →

The 2024–25 Ligue d'Or season (previously known as the Ivorian Basketball Championship) was the season of the Ivorian Basketball Championship, the highest level of men's basketball in Ivory Coast. It is the first season since the league was re-named, and the season began on 2 March 2024 with the opening day of the regular season. The league existed of twelve teams who played the regular season to determine the playoff participants.

ABC Fighters were the defending champions, and clinched their 22nd championship, after defeating SOA in the finals of the playoffs.

== Teams ==
Club	Location
ABC Fighters	Abidjan
ABI Snipers	Abidjan
ASA	Abidjan
Azur	Abidjan
CBA	Abidjan
CSA Treichville	Abidjan
Global	Abidjan
Hypersonics	Abidjan
JCA	Abidjan
ROBC	Abidjan
SOA	Yamoussoukro
Warriors	Abidjan

== Regular season ==
Pos	Team	Pld	W	L	GF	GA	GD	Pts	Qualification or relegation
1	ABC Fighters	21	16	5	1616	1353	+263	32	Advance to playoffs
2	JCA	21	16	5	1432	1174	+258	32	Advance to playoffs
3	SOA	21	16	5	1430	1280	+150	32	Advance to playoffs
4	Azur	21	14	7	1372	1311	+61	28	Advance to playoffs
5	Warriors	21	13	8	1379	1334	+45	26	Advance to playoffs
6	Hypersonics	21	10	11	1311	1266	+45	20	Advance to playoffs
7	ABI Snipers	21	10	11	1275	1343	−68	20	Advance to playoffs
8	ROBC	21	10	11	1297	1315	−18	20	Advance to playoffs
9	ASA	21	7	14	1279	1330	−51	14	
10	CBA	21	7	14	1319	1450	−131	14	
11	Global	21	5	16	1233	1459	−226	10	
12	CSA Treichville	21	2	19	1107	1435	−328	4	Relegated to Division 2

Source: FIBB

== Playoffs ==
Quarterfinals
1	ABC Fighters	2
8	ROBC	0
4	Azur	2
5	Warriors	0
3	SOA	2
6	Hypersonics	0
2	JCA	2
7	ABI Snipers	0

Semifinals
1	ABC Fighters	2
4	Azur	0
2	JCA	1
3	SOA	3

Finals
1	ABC Fighters	2
3	SOA	1
