= 2023 BAL qualification =

2023 BAL qualification (Road to BAL 2023)
- Association: FIBA Africa
- League: Road to BAL
- Sport: Basketball
- Duration: 10 October – 27 November 2022
- Games: 50
- Teams: 21

West Division
- Division champions: (Ivory Coast) ABC Fighters
- Top scorer: Dane Miller Jr. (SLAC)

East Division
- Division champions: (South Africa) Cape Town Tigers
- Top scorer: Evans Ganapamo (Cape Town Tigers)

Seasons
- ← 2022 2024 →

The qualification for the 2023 BAL season, also known as Road to BAL 2023, was the 3rd edition of the qualifying tournaments for the Basketball Africa League. The tournaments were organised by FIBA Africa and are held from 10 October to 27 November 2022. The format was similar to the previous two seasons, with a group phase and an elite 16 being held.

== Team allocation ==
On 21 September 2021, FIBA Africa announced the teams in the qualifying tournaments as well as the six countries that would qualify directly.

- 1st, 2nd, 3rd, etc.: standings in the domestic league
- BAL: Qualified as team that was directly qualified in the 2022 BAL season
- QS: Teams from a country that qualified for the 2022 BAL season through the qualifying tournaments
- WC: Wild card

West Division		East Division	
Elite 16
(Cameroon) FAP (1st)^{QS}	(Morocco) AS Salé (1st)^{BAL}	(South Sudan) ~~Cobra Sport (1st)~~^{QS} (Note: Cobra Sport was directly qualified for the Elite 16, but decided to withdraw.)	(South Africa) Cape Town Tigers (1st)^{QS}
(Guinea) SLAC (1st)^{QS}		NBA Academy Africa (WC)	(Mozambique) Ferroviário da Beira (1st)^{QS}
Group phase
(Benin) Elan Coton (1st)	(Ivory Coast) ABC (1st)	(Burundi) Urunani (1st)	(Zambia) Matero Magic (1st)
(Mali) Stade Malien (1st)	(Equatorial Guinea) Nueva Era (1st)	(Uganda) City Oilers (1st)	(Tanzania) ABC (1st)
(Gabon) Espoir (2nd) (Note: Espoir, as runners-up of the 2022 Gabonese Cup, replaced champions Clutch Time, who were unable to finance their participation.)	(Niger) Nigelec (1st)	(Madagascar) COSPN (1st)	(Kenya) KPA (1st)
(Central African Republic) Bangui Sporting Club (1st)		(Comoros) Djabal Iconi (1st)	

=== Withdrawing teams ===
Nine teams were drawn in a group for the group phase, but withdrew prior to the start of the games.

Group A
- (Ghana) Reformers of Prisons
- (Cape Verde) Undisclosed Cape Verdean team
Group B
- (Chad) Tempo
- (Democratic Republic of the Congo) Vita Club
Group C
- (Ethiopia) Hawassa City
Group D
- (Somalia) Dekedaha
- (Mauritius) Roche-Bois Warriors
- (Zimbabwe) Foxes

== Group phase ==
=== Group A ===
The group was initially set to feature six teams, including the champions from Cape Verde and the Reformers of Prisons from Ghana. The Reformers of Prisons withdrew, leaving four teams in the group. The games of Group A are held in Niamey, Niger, and are played from 18 October to 23 October.

Pos	Team	Pld	W	L	PF	PA	PD	Pts	Qualification
1	(Ivory Coast) ABC Fighters	3	3	0	236	166	+70	6	Advance to elite 16
2	(Mali) Stade Malien	3	2	1	221	157	+64	5	Advance to elite 16
3	(Benin) Elan Coton (W)	3	1	2	167	239	−72	4	Advance to elite 16
4	(Niger) Nigelec (H)	3	0	3	176	238	−62	3	

Source: Road to BAL
(H) Hosts; (W) Advanced with wild card

21 October 2022
15:00 (GMT+1)

Boxscore

Stade Malien (Mali)	54–66	(Ivory Coast) ABC
Scoring by quarter: 19–8, 14–28, 11–15, 10–15

Palais du 29 Juillet, Niamey, Niger

21 October 2022
17:30 (GMT+1)

Boxscore

Nigelec (Niger)	65–75	(Benin) Elan Coton
Scoring by quarter: 13–19, 17–15, 15-17, 20–24

Palais du 29 Juillet, Niamey, Niger

22 October 2022
14:00 (GMT+1)

Boxscore

Elan Coton (Benin)	36–85	(Mali) Stade Malien
Scoring by quarter: 2–25, 10–20, 15–19, 9–21

Palais du 29 Juillet, Niamey, Niger

22 October 2022
16:30 (GMT+1)

Boxscore

ABC (Ivory Coast)	81–56	(Niger) Nigelec
Scoring by quarter: 26–9, 17–15, 18–14, 20–18

Palais du 29 Juillet, Niamey, Niger

23 October 2022
14:00 (GMT+1)

Boxscore

ABC (Ivory Coast)	89–56	(Benin) Elan Coton
Scoring by quarter: 21–9, 23–15, 20–19, 25–13

Palais du 29 Juillet, Niamey, Niger

23 October 2022
16:30 (GMT+1)

Boxscore

Nigelec (Niger)	55–82	(Mali) Stade Malien
Scoring by quarter: 11–21, 16–26, 12–15, 16–20

Palais du 29 Juillet, Niamey, Niger

=== Group B ===
Tempo BC from Chad withdrew. Vita Club from the DR Congo withdrew due to the lack of financial means.

The games of Group B were held in Yaoundé, Cameroon, and were played from 11 October to 16 October.

Pos	Team	Pld	W	L	PF	PA	PD	Pts	Qualification
1	(Central African Republic) Bangui Sporting Club	2	2	0	140	109	+31	4	Advance to elite 16
2	(Equatorial Guinea) Nueva Era	2	1	1	126	133	−7	3	Advance to elite 16
3	(Gabon) Espoir	2	0	2	113	137	−24	2	

Source: Road to BAL

12 October
17:00 (GMT+1)

Boxscore

Bangui Sporting Club (Central African Republic)	71–49	(Gabon) Espoir
Scoring by quarter: 11–14, 15–13, 19–12, 26–10
Pts: Claiborne, Nguepy Dongmo 15; Rebs: Kouguere 9 Asts: Kouguere 3		Pts: Aworet 17; Rebs: Loussi 10; Asts: Minko, Lendouga 2

Yaoundé Multipurpose Sports Complex, Yaoundé, Cameroon

12 October
17:00 (GMT+1)

Boxscore

Nueva Era (Equatorial Guinea)	60–69	(Central African Republic) Bangui Sporting Club
Scoring by quarter: 9–25, 13–10, 18–22, 20–12
Pts: Terrell 14; Rebs: Soup Soup 11; Asts: Terrell, Soup Soup 3		Pts: Kouguere 17; Rebs: Nguepy Dongmo 8 Asts: Three players 4

Yaoundé Multipurpose Sports Complex, Yaoundé, Cameroon

14 October
17:00 (GMT+1)

Boxscore

Espoir (Gabon)	64–66	(Equatorial Guinea) Nueva Era
Scoring by quarter: 20–10, 13–18, 19–16, 12–22
Pts: Minko, Ndoh-Mapangou 14; Rebs: Kanga Lendouga 12; Asts: Four players 2		Pts: Worthy 21; Rebs: Hinestrosa 10; Asts: Worthy 6

Yaoundé Multipurpose Sports Complex, Yaoundé, Cameroon

=== Group C ===
Although initially planned to take place on 25–30 October, the games were rescheduled to 28–30 October. Hawassa City from Ethiopia withdrew.

The games of Group C were schedules to be hosted in Kampala, Uganda, but were pulled from the country because of the 2022 Uganda Ebola outbreak. Dar es Salaam in Tanzania was announced as the new venue.

Pos	Team	Pld	W	L	PF	PA	PD	Pts	Qualification
1	(Burundi) Urunani	3	3	0	206	156	+50	6	Advance to elite 16
2	(Uganda) City Oilers	3	2	1	219	181	+38	5	Advance to elite 16
3	(Tanzania) ABC (H)	3	1	2	165	193	−28	4	
4	(Zambia) Matero Magic (W)	3	0	3	159	219	−60	3	Advance to elite 16

Source: Road to BAL
(H) Hosts; (W) Advanced with wild card

28 October
16:30

Boxscore

City Oilers (Uganda)	90–54	(Zambia) Matero Magic
Scoring by quarter: 19–19, 24–9, 24–10, 23–16
Pts: Roebuck 26; Rebs: Azolibe 9 Asts: Okello 6		Pts: Mukelabai 11; Rebs: Mauwe 8 Asts: Mauwe 5

Benjamin Mpaka National Indoor Stadium, Dar es Salaam

28 October
19:00

Boxscore

ABC (Tanzania)	45–70	(Burundi) Urunani
Scoring by quarter: 7–21, 15–19, 14–13, 9–17
Pts: Athumani 9 Rebs: Chuma 8 Asts: Mwenda 2		Pts: Ndikumana 18; Rebs: Baru 9 Asts: Kazunguzibwa, Ngenzahayo 3

Benjamin Mpaka National Indoor Stadium, Dar es Salaam

29 October
16:30

Boxscore

Urunani (Burundi)	64–58	(Uganda) City Oilers
Scoring by quarter: 19–9, 9–14, 18–20, 18–15
Pts: Kazunguzibwa 21		Pts: Roebuck, Azolide 17

Benjamin Mpaka National Indoor Stadium, Dar es Salaam

29 October
19:00

Boxscore

ABC (Tanzania)	57–52	(Zambia) Matero Magic
Scoring by quarter: 12–13, 11–8, 14–16, 20–15
Pts: Athumani 17		Pts: Leroy 13

Benjamin Mpaka National Indoor Stadium, Dar es Salaam

30 October
16:30

Boxscore

Matero Magic (Zambia)	53–72	(Burundi) Urunani
Scoring by quarter: 19–18, 11–15, 6–16, 17–23
		Pts: Ndikumana 18

Benjamin Mpaka National Indoor Stadium, Dar es Salaam

30 October
19:00

Boxscore

City Oilers (Uganda)	71–63	(Tanzania) ABC
Scoring by quarter: 27–20, 10–15, 16–17, 18–11
Pts: Roebuck 31		Pts: Athumani 31

Benjamin Mpaka National Indoor Stadium, Dar es Salaam

=== Group D ===
The games of Group D were held in Antananarivo, Madagascar, and are played from 18 to 23 October. Dekedaha from Somalia and Foxes from Zimbabwe withdrew, leaving four teams in the group. One day before the start, Roche-Bois Warriors from Mauritius withdrew as well.

Pos	Team	Pld	W	L	PF	PA	PD	Pts	Qualification
1	(Madagascar) COSPN (H)	2	2	0	176	118	+58	4	Advance to elite 16
2	(Kenya) KPA	2	1	1	180	103	+77	3	Advance to elite 16
3	(Comoros) Djabal Iconi	2	0	2	95	230	−135	2	

Source: Road to BAL
(H) Hosts

21 October
17:30 (GMT+3)

Boxscore

COSPN (Madagascar)	110–58	(Comoros) Djabal Iconi
Scoring by quarter: 26–14, 28–21, 22–11, 34–12
Pts: Randriamapionona 25; Rebs: Solondrainy 14; Asts: Randriamampionona, Rahajaniaina 6		Pts: Soilihi 12; Rebs: Aboubacar 8 Asts: Chaher 5

Palais des Sports Mahamasina, Antananarivo, Madagascar

22 October
15:00 (GMT+3)

Boxscore

Djabal Iconi (Comoros)	37–120	(Kenya) KPA
Scoring by quarter: 10–27, 10–23, 7–39, 10–31
Pts: Mchangama 14; Rebs: Mchangama 11; Asts: Mchangama, Chaher 1		Pts: Koranga 24; Rebs: Kidong'o 12; Asts: Adera 6

Palais des Sports Mahamasina, Antananarivo, Madagascar

23 October
17:30 (GMT+3)

Boxscore

COSPN (Madagascar)	66–60	(Kenya) KPA
Scoring by quarter: 14–23, 10–9, 27–16, 15–12
Pts: Rahajaniaina 15; Rebs: Ratianarivo 12; Asts: Randriamampionona 4		Pts: Wachira 13; Rebs: Koranga 11; Asts: Koranga, Khaemba 2

Palais des Sports Mahamasina, Antananarivo, Madagascar

== Elite 16 ==
In the elite 16, the eight teams from the first round are joined by six teams that qualified in the 2022 qualification. The NBA Academy Africa and Elan Coton joined as wild cards.

=== Draw ===
The draw was held on 3 November 2022 on Abidjan.

=== West Division ===
The games of the East Division are held in Abidjan, Ivory Coast, and are played from 15 to 20 November.

==== Group A ====
Pos	Team	Pld	W	L	PF	PA	PD	Pts	Qualification
1	(Central African Republic) Bangui Sporting Club	3	3	0	201	179	+22	6	Advance to second round
2	(Ivory Coast) ABC Fighters	3	1	2	233	214	+19	4 (Note: Ranking based on point difference: 1) ABC Fighters +24; 2) AS Salé +9; 3) Elan Coton –33.)	Advance to second round
3	(Morocco) AS Salé	3	1	2	196	199	−3	4	
4	(Benin) Elan Coton	3	1	2	178	216	−38	4	

Source: Road to BAL
Notes:

14 November
15:30

Boxscore

Bangui Sporting Club (Central African Republic)	67–55	(Morocco) AS Salé
Scoring by quarter: 9–13, 16–13, 22–18, 20–11
Pts: Perriere 20; Rebs: Perriere 10; Asts: Fula Nganga, Djimrabaye 3		Pts: Kourdou 17; Rebs: Azouga 7 Asts: Harouna 3

Palais des Sports de Treichville, Abidjan

14 November
20:30

Boxscore

ABC Fighters (Ivory Coast)	96–56	(Benin) Elan Coton
Scoring by quarter: 23–12, 22–14, 25–19, 26–14
Pts: Westbrook 15; Rebs: Fofana 7 Asts: Kone 6		Pts: Gilchrist 13; Rebs: Gilchrist 10; Asts: Afuwape 7

Palais des Sports de Treichville, Abidjan

15 November
15:30

Boxscore

AS Salé (Morocco)	58–62	(Benin) Elan Coton
Scoring by quarter: 11–9, 27–13, 11–26, 9–14
Pts: El Masbahi 14; Rebs: Harouna 7 Asts: Harouna 4		Pts: Afuwape 19; Rebs: Gilchrist 9 Asts: Afuwape 6

Palais des Sports de Treichville, Abidjan

15 November
20:30

Boxscore

Bangui Sporting Club (Central African Republic)	72–67	(Ivory Coast) ABC Fighters
Scoring by quarter: 12–16, 18–22, 17–10, 25–19
Pts: Djimrabaye 18; Rebs: Gray 13; Asts: Djimrabaye 7		Pts: Fofana 19; Rebs: Lufile 9 Asts: Pacheco Ortiz 6

Palais des Sports de Treichville, Abidjan

16 November
15:30

Boxscore

Elan Coton (Benin)	57–62	(Central African Republic) Bangui Sporting Club
Scoring by quarter: 15–19, 18–12, 14–16, 10–15
Pts: Afuwape 19; Rebs: Afuwape 8 Asts: Afuwape 5		Pts: Fula Nganga 22; Rebs: Gasana 8 Asts: Gasana 4

Palais des Sports de Treichville, Abidjan

16 November
20:30

Boxscore

ABC Fighters (Ivory Coast)	70–83	(Morocco) AS Salé
Scoring by quarter: 21–22, 17–18, 9–22, 23–21
Pts: Fofana 15; Rebs: M. Kone 4 Asts: Lufile 3		Pts: Harouna 23; Rebs: Bakkali 15; Asts: El Mahsini 9

Palais des Sports de Treichville, Abidjan

==== Group B ====
Pos	Team	Pld	W	L	PF	PA	PD	Pts	Qualification
1	(Mali) Stade Malien	3	3	0	238	192	+46	6	Advance to second round
2	(Guinea) SLAC	3	2	1	252	226	+26	5	Advance to second round
3	(Cameroon) FAP	3	1	2	217	222	−5	4	
4	(Equatorial Guinea) Nueva Era	3	0	3	205	272	−67	3	

Source: Road to BAL

14 November
13:00

Boxscore

Nueva Era (Equatorial Guinea)	69–91	(Guinea) SLAC
Scoring by quarter: 18–21, 14–20, 13–27, 24–23
Pts: Terrell 26; Rebs: Ntutumu 9 Asts: Ndong Midje		Pts: Poole 20; Rebs: Bah, Miller Jr. 10; Asts: Miller Jr. 4

Palais des Sports de Treichville, Abidjan

14 November
18:00

Boxscore

FAP (Cameroon)	52–65	(Mali) Stade Malien
Scoring by quarter: 10–17, 18–17, 13–14, 11–17
Pts: Almeida 11; Rebs: Ngaransou 12; Asts: Tametong 6		Pts: Berthe 15; Rebs: Diarra 14; Asts: Berthe 5

Palais des Sports de Treichville, Abidjan

15 November
13:00

Boxscore

Nueva Era (Equatorial Guinea)	72–90	(Cameroon) FAP
Scoring by quarter: 26–18, 14–21, 14–26, 18–25
Pts: Terrell 26; Rebs: Hinestrosa 9 Asts: Hinestrosa 4		Pts: Mendes 20; Rebs: Ngaransou 12; Asts: Keumoe 6

Palais des Sports de Treichville, Abidjan

15 November
18:00

Boxscore

SLAC (Guinea)	76–82	(Mali) Stade Malien
Scoring by quarter: 21–20, 18–23, 22–202, 15–19
Pts: Miller Jr. 22; Rebs: Miller Jr. 10; Asts: Nwabuzor 5		Pts: Mamadou Keita 20; Rebs: Diarra 11; Asts: Makan Keita 4

Palais des Sports de Treichville, Abidjan

16 November
13:00

Boxscore

Stade Malien (Mali)	91–64	(Equatorial Guinea) Nueva Era
Scoring by quarter: 28–14, 18–18, 18–14, 27–18
Pts: Berthe 13; Rebs: Three players 3 Asts: Mamadou Keita 4		Pts: Worthy 21; Rebs: Hinestrosa 10; Asts: Bobepari 5

Palais des Sports de Treichville, Abidjan

16 November
18:00

Boxscore

FAP (Cameroon)	75–85	(Guinea) SLAC
Scoring by quarter: 25–19, 18–20, 16–28, 16–18
Pts: Almeida, Keummoe 13; Rebs: Ngaransou 6 Asts: Keumoe 6		Pts: Miller Jr. 22; Rebs: Miller Jr. 14; Asts: Nwabuzor, Poole 5

Palais des Sports de Treichville, Abidjan

==== Final round ====
Semi-finals
18 November
(Central African Republic) Bangui Sporting Club	61
(Guinea) SLAC	69
18 November
(Mali) Stade Malien	59
(Ivory Coast) ABC Fighters	62

Final
19 November
(Guinea) SLAC	70
(Ivory Coast) ABC Fighters	81
Third place game
19 November
(Central African Republic) Bangui Sporting Club	59
(Mali) Stade Malien	62

===== Semi-finals =====
18 November
18:30

Boxscore

Bangui Sporting Club (Central African Republic)	61–69	(Guinea) SLAC
Scoring by quarter: 14–20, 13–14, 18–18, 16–17
Pts: Gray 15; Rebs: Gray 20; Asts: Gasana 4		Pts: Poole 19; Rebs: Miller Jr. 13; Asts: Miller Jr. 4

Palais des Sports de Treichville, Abidjan

18 November
21:00

Boxscore

Stade Malien (Mali)	63–80	(Ivory Coast) ABC Fighters
Scoring by quarter: 10–21, 18–20, 13–22, 22–17
Pts: Berthe 15; Rebs: Diarra 12; Asts: Three players 3		Pts: Konaté 17; Rebs: Kone 10; Asts: Pacheco Ortiz 4

Palais des Sports de Treichville, Abidjan

===== Third place game =====
19 November
18:30

Report

Bangui Sporting Club (Central African Republic)	59–62	(Mali) Stade Malien
Scoring by quarter: 15–26, 18–24, 17–10, 9–12
Pts: Gasana, Fula Nganga 15; Rebs: Gray 11; Asts: Nambaï 2		Pts: Berthe 22; Rebs: Diarra 18; Asts: Makan 5

Palais des Sports de Treichville, Abidjan

===== Final =====
19 November
21:00

Boxscore

SLAC (Guinea)	70–81	(Ivory Coast) ABC Fighters
Scoring by quarter: 21–18, 8–29, 20–20, 21–14
Pts: Doumbouya 16; Rebs: Doumbouya 11; Asts: Thiam, Nwabuzor 5		Pts: Diarra, Otto 16; Rebs: Kone 10; Asts: Pacheco Ortiz 7

Palais des Sports de Treichville, Abidjan

=== East Division ===
The games of the East Division are held in Ellis Park Arena in Johannesburg, South Africa, and are played from 22 to 27 November. Initially, it was announced that games would be held in Cape Town.

==== Group A ====
The games played by the NBA Academy Africa are not scored and are ineligible to qualify for the next round; however, games against the team will be used for their opponents' standings.

Pos	Team	Pld	W	L	PF	PA	PD	Pts	Qualification
1	(Burundi) Urunani	3	2	1	200	171	+29	5 (Note: Tie-breaker: Cape Town Tigers 49–59 Urunani.)	Advance to semi-finals
2	(South Africa) Cape Town Tigers	3	2	1	230	191	+39	5	Advance to semi-finals
3	NBA Academy Africa	3	2	1	223	223	0	5	Unable to qualify for next round
4	(Kenya) KPA	3	0	3	184	252	−68	3	

Source: Road to BAL
Notes:

22 November
13:00

Report

Urunani (Burundi)	72–43	(Kenya) KPA
Scoring by quarter: 18–5, 18–8, 18–14, 18–16
Pts: Ndikumana 18; Rebs: Ndikumana 14; Asts: Ndikumana, Filer 4		Pts: Williams 13; Rebs: Wijass 8 Asts: Ogol 3

Ellis Park Arena, Johannesburg

22 November
18:00

Report

Cape Town Tigers (South Africa)	85–60	NBA Academy Africa
Scoring by quarter: 14–10, 28–19, 29–17, 14–14
Pts: Gbinije 22; Rebs: Gbinije 7 Asts: Deing 7		Pts: Darlan 20; Rebs: Chinyelu 12; Asts: Darlan 5

Ellis Park Arena, Johannesburg

23 November
13:00

Report

NBA Academy Africa	79–69	(Burundi) Urunani
Scoring by quarter: 25–30, 16–15, 20–13, 18–11
Pts: Darlan 24; Rebs: Chinyelu 17; Asts: Darlan 7		Pts: Filer 17; Rebs: Filer 8 Asts: Three players 4

Ellis Park Arena, Johannesburg

23 November
18:00

Report

KPA (Kenya)	72–96	(South Africa) Cape Town Tigers
Scoring by quarter: 26–19, 19–22, 23–34, 11–21
Pts: Williams 24; Rebs: Williams 8 Asts: Ogol, Khaemba 3		Pts: Ganapamo 20; Rebs: Putney 9 Asts: Ganapamo, Deing 5

Ellis Park Arena, Johannesburg

24 November
14:00

Report

KPA (Kenya)	69–84	NBA Academy Africa
Scoring by quarter: 33–23, 14–17, 7–25, 15–19
Pts: Wachira 21; Rebs: Brady 7 Asts: Wachira, Brady 3		Pts: Darlan 25; Rebs: Chinyelu, Maluach 9 Asts: Darlan 5

Ellis Park Arena, Johannesburg

24 November
18:00

Report

Cape Town Tigers (South Africa)	49–59	(Burundi) Urunani
Scoring by quarter: 12–25, 13–8, 9–19, 15–7
Pts: Ganapamo 14; Rebs: Sibanyoni 10; Asts: Three players 2		Pts: Filer 28; Rebs: Parker-Rivera 11; Asts: Nijimbere, Baru 3

Ellis Park Arena, Johannesburg

==== Group B ====
Matero Magic from Zambia were given a wild card to join Group B, after Cobra Sport from South Sudan withdrew.

Pos	Team	Pld	W	L	PF	PA	PD	Pts	Qualification
1	(Uganda) City Oilers	3	3	0	242	204	+38	6	Advance to second round
2	(Mozambique) Ferroviário da Beira	3	2	1	242	198	+44	5	Advance to second round
3	(Zambia) Matero Magic	3	1	2	213	227	−14	4	
4	(Madagascar) COSPN	3	0	3	193	238	−45	3	

Source: Road to BAL

22 November
11:30

Report

City Oilers (Uganda)	71–59	(Madagascar) COSPN
Scoring by quarter: 22–11, 25–15, 11–23, 13–10
Pts: Roebuck 17; Rebs: Barnaba 10; Asts: Drileba 3		Pts: Randriamampionona 14; Rebs: Solondrainy, Rabibisoa 7 Asts: Randriamampionona, Todimasiniaina 4

Ellis Park Arena, Johannesburg

22 November
16:30

Report

Ferroviário da Beira (Mozambique)	63–57	(Zambia) Matero Magic
Scoring by quarter: 21–14, 16–9, 13–16, 13–18
Pts: Perry 24; Rebs: Murray 12; Asts: Nurmamade 4		Pts: Chona 11; Rebs: Kandulu 19; Asts: Ngoma 4

Ellis Park Arena, Johannesburg

23 November
11:30

Report

COSPN (Madagascar)	53–84	(Mozambique) Ferroviário da Beira
Scoring by quarter: 8–26, 15–28, 13–13, 17–17
Pts: Ratianarivo 15; Rebs: Coulter 15; Asts: Razakaria 3		Pts: Nurmamade 14; Rebs: Murray 8 Asts: Munguambe 7

Ellis Park Arena, Johannesburg

23 November
16:30

Report

Matero Magic (Zambia)	73–83	(Uganda) City Oilers
Scoring by quarter: 17–17, 8–26, 18–17, 30–23
Pts: Phiri 18; Rebs: Kandulu 14; Asts: Ngoma 4		Pts: Jones 26; Rebs: Jones 9 Asts: Enabu 5

Ellis Park Arena, Johannesburg

24 November
11:30

Report

COSPN (Madagascar)	81–83	(Zambia) Matero Magic
Scoring by quarter: 22–24, 20–23, 23–19, 16–17
Pts: Ratianarivo 25; Rebs: Coulter 11; Asts: Rabibisoa, Randriamampionona 5		Pts: Phiri 22; Rebs: Kandulu 14; Asts: Kainda 3

Ellis Park Arena, Johannesburg

24 November
16:30

Report

Ferroviário da Beira (Mozambique)	72–88	(Uganda) City Oilers
Scoring by quarter: 16–23, 20–19, 14–23, 22–23
Pts: Perry 21; Rebs: Ubisse 9 Asts: Perry 7		Pts: Roebuck, Barnaba 17; Rebs: Barnaba 9 Asts: Enabu 7

Ellis Park Arena, Johannesburg

==== Final round ====
Semi-finals
26 November
(Burundi) Urunani	62
(Mozambique) Ferroviário da Beira	68
26 November
(Uganda) City Oilers	69
(South Africa) Cape Town Tigers	75

Final
27 November
(Mozambique) Ferroviário da Beira	71
(South Africa) Cape Town Tigers	81
Third place game
27 November
(Burundi) Urunani	62
(Uganda) City Oilers	71

===== Semi-finals =====
26 November
16:30 (GMT+2)

Report

Urunani (Burundi)	62–68	(Mozambique) Ferroviário da Beira
Scoring by quarter: 15–19, 13–10, 16–19, 18–20
Pts: Ngenzahayo 16; Rebs: Parker-Rivera 10; Asts: Filer 5		Pts: Ubisse 21; Rebs: Ubisse 13; Asts: Nurmamade, Murray 4

Ellis Park Arena, Johannesburg

26 November
19:00 (GMT+2)

Report

City Oilers (Uganda)	69–75	(South Africa) Cape Town Tigers
Scoring by quarter: 7–14, 19–16, 26–21, 17–24
Pts: Jones 40

Ellis Park Arena, Johannesburg

==== Third place game ====
27 November
16:30 (GMT+2)

Report

Urunani (Burundi)	62–71	(Uganda) City Oilers
Scoring by quarter: 12–17, 14–10, 14–19, 22–25

Ellis Park Arena, Johannesburg

==== Final ====
27 November
19:00 (GMT+2)

Report

Ferroviário da Beira (Mozambique)	71–81	(South Africa) Cape Town Tigers
Scoring by quarter: 11–27, 20–17, 25–19, 15–18
Pts: Ubisse 18; Rebs: Ubisse, Murray 8 Asts: Malale 4		Pts: Ganapamo 34; Rebs: Putney 9 Asts: Putney 7

Ellis Park Arena, Johannesburg

== Statistics ==
=== Individual statistic leaders ===
Note: statistics from six games in Group A, as well as two games in the final round of the Eltie 16 East Division are missing.

Category	Player	Team(s)	Statistic	Played
Efficiency per game	Dane Miller Jr.	SLAC	24.5	4
Points per game	Evans Ganapamo	Cape Town Tigers	21.0	4
Rebounds per game	Dane Miller Jr.	SLAC	11.8	4
Assists per game	Elly Randriamampionona	COSPN	4.3	4
Steals per game	Kenny Gasana	Bangui Sporting Club	2.8	6
Blocks per game	Chris Obekpa	SLAC	4.3	4
Turnovers per game	Dane Miller Jr.	SLAC	5.5	4
Minutes per game	Mandrell Worthy	Nueva Era	38.3	4
FG%	Dane Miller Jr.	SLAC	54.2%	4
3P%	Ibrahima Fofana	SLAC	50.0%	4
FT%	Mandrell Worthy	Nueva Era	85.2%	4
Double-doubles	Dane Miller Jr.	SLAC	4	4

=== Individual game highs ===
Category	Player	Team	Statistic
Efficiency	Evans Ganapamo	Cape Town Tigers	35
Points	Falando Jones	City Oilers	40
Rebounds	Kendall Gray	Bangui Sporting Club	20
Assists	Yassine El Mahsini	AS Salé	9
Steals	Dhieu Deing	Cape Town Tigers	8
Blocks	Chris Obekpa	SLAC	7
Three pointers	Elly Randriamampionona	COSPN	6
