= Jeunesse Club d'Abidjan =

Jeunesse Club d'Abidjan may refer to:

- Jeunesse Club d'Abidjan (basketball)
- JC d'Abidjan, the football team
