= Lionel Kouadio =

Ivorian basketball player

CB Morón
- Position: Shooting guard
- League: LEB Plata

Personal information
- Born: 1 September 2001 (age 25) Abidjan, Ivory Coast
- Listed height: 1.91 m (6 ft 3 in)
- Listed weight: 80 kg (176 lb)

Career information
- College: Daytona State (2020–2021)

Career history
- 2021: Abidjan Azur
- 2021–2022: Ourense
- 2021–2022: → Solgáleo Bosco Salesianos
- 2022–present: CB Morón

Career highlights
- Liga EBA Conference Finals MVP (2022); Ivorian League MVP (2021)

Lionel Nathan Kouadio (born 1 September 2001) is an Ivorian basketball player who plays for CB Morón and the Ivory Coast national team. Standing at 1.92 m (6 ft 3 1/2 in), he plays as shooting guard.

He has been described as the "future of Ivorian basketball" by some media outlets.

== Early and college career ==
Kouadio started playing basketball with CO Descartes. He also joined the Basketball Without Borders Africa camp in 2018. Kouadio later played for the LaBase Academy in Abidjan. In August 2020, Kouadio was announced to be part of the incoming class of the Daytona State College basketball team.

== Professional career ==
In 2021, he returned to Ivory Coast to play for Abidjan Azur in the Ivorian Basketball Championship. He was named the national league's season MVP after averaging 19 points, 7.5 rebounds and 3.4 assists per game.

On 3 November 2021, Kouadio signed a two-year contract with Club Ourense Baloncesto of the LEB Oro.

He later joined Solgáleo Bosco Salesianos of the Liga EBA, the Spanish fourth tier league. In September 2022, Kouadio was named the MVP of the Conference A Finals after scoring 37 points in the final.

In the 2022–23 season, he played for CB Morón in the LEB Plata.

== National team career ==
Kouadio has represented the Ivory Coast national basketball team as well as the U18 team. At age 19 on opening day, he was the youngest player on the roster for AfroBasket 2021. He won the silver medal at the 2023 FIBA AfroCan in Angola, and averaged 11.3 points and 7.5 rebounds per game.
