= Nelson Morales (basketball) =

Player for the basketball league in Puerto Rico

Atleticos de San German
- League: BSN

Career information
- Playing career: 1963–1973

Career history
- 1963–1973: Atleticos de San German

Career BSN statistics
- Points: 1,069 (7.5 ppg)
- Rebounds: 277 (2.0 rpg)
- Assists: 181 (1.3 apg)

Nelson Morales (born approx. 1945) is a retired Puerto Rican BSN professional basketball player. He played nine seasons for the Atleticos de San German in the city of San German, averaging 7.5 points, 2.0 rebounds and 1.3 assists per game.

== Basketball career ==
Morales began playing for the Atleticos in 1963, playing in 14 games that season, with an average of 4.2 points a game, without recording a rebound or assist in any of the 14 games he played at.

For the next two years, his stats did not improve very much, but in 1966, he saw an increase in play time, which in turn led to a much improved level of performance and he averaged double digits in scoring for the first time in his BSN career, scoring 230 points in 20 games for an average of 11.5 points a game. He also caught his first recorded BSN rebound and passed his first recorded BSN assist, finishing with 2.6 and 1.1 per game in those two categories, respectively.

Aside from having a woeful season from the free-throw line during 1967, (he made only 38 of 171 attempts for an average of 22 percent free throws made) the 1967 BSN season turned out to be the best, statistically speaking, of Morales' 9 seasons at Puerto Rico's top professional basketball league, as he averaged 13.7 points per game, with 4.3 rebounds and 3.2 assists per game, all career highs for the young basketball player.

Those numbers declined sharply during the 1968 season, when he was able to play in only 9 games due to injury, and had averages of 6.6 points, 2.2 rebounds and 1.8 assists per game. Morales spent the 1969 BSN season sidelined and returned during the 1970 season, faring a bit better statistically-wise but also falling victim to injury again. During the 1970 season, Nelson Morales played in 11 BSN games, averaging 1.8 assists, 3.1 rebounds and 8.2 points per game.

Once again, injuries hampered his career during 1970 and 1971, year in which he did not see action during the 1971 BSN season. In 1972, Morales returned to the BSN basketball courts, participating in 13 games for the Atleticos, scoring 6.6 points, passing for 2.0 assists and catching 1.5 rebounds for the Atleticos.

Finally, Morales participated in 8 games during the 1973 BSN season for the Atleticos, with an average of 1.0 points and rebounds per game, without recording any assists. He announced his retirement from professional basketball soon after.

== Other sports ==
The town of San German honored Morales by naming a local softball league, the "Nelson 'Cayito' Morales" softball league. The league was incorporated in 2002.

== See also ==
- List of Puerto Ricans
