= Nueva Era Basket Club =

Nueva Era
- League: National Basketball League
- Founded: 2021
- History: Nueva Era Basket Club; 2021–present
- Location: Malabo, Equatorial Guinea
- President: Jules Cesar Micha Nfono
- Head coach: Hilario Mengue Nsue
- Website: nuevaerabc.com

Nueva Era Basket Club (in English: New Era Basketball Club) is an Equatorial Guinean basketball team based in Malabo. The team was founded in 2021 by a group of basketball enthusiast, led by Jules Cesar Micha Nfono. The establishment of the Basketball Africa League (BAL) in the same year inspired them to provide a club for the youth of national basketball.

In 2021, the team signed Spanish coach Ignacio Duran and two foreign players in David Stachoskij and Daniel Saunders. Nueva Era won the national championship in 2022.

Nueva Era played in the 2023 BAL qualification, and won one game in the first round against Espoir, becoming the first Equatoguinean team to win a BAL qualification game and to advance past the first round.

== Honours ==
National Basketball League

- Champions (2): 2020–21, 2021–22

June 5 Basketball Tournament

- Winners (1): 2021

== Players ==
=== 2022 roster ===
Nueva Era roster
Players
Coaches

Pos.	No.	Nat.	Name
PF	2	(Central African Republic)	Ngaïfei, Omega
	3	(United States)	Terrell, Deonta
	4	(Equatorial Guinea)	Ndong, Juan Bautista
	5	(Equatorial Guinea)	Esono, Jorge Luis
	6	(Equatorial Guinea)	Obiang, Pastor
	7	(Equatorial Guinea)	Nguema, Jesús
	8	(Equatorial Guinea)	Esuba, Ángel Manuel
	9	(Equatorial Guinea)	Hinestrosa, Ruslán
C	10	(Cameroon)	Soup Soup, Wembé
	12	(Equatorial Guinea)	Ntutumu, Reginaldo
	14	(Equatorial Guinea)	Nguba, David Enrique
	15	(United States)	Worthy, Mandrell

Head coach

- (Equatorial Guinea) Hilario Mengue

Assistant coach(es)

- (Equatorial Guinea) Adolfo Babasasa
- (Equatorial Guinea) Francisco Ndong

Legend

- (C) Team captain
- Injured

- Roster
Updated: 20 October 2022
