= Robert Gilchrist (basketball) =

British professional basketball player

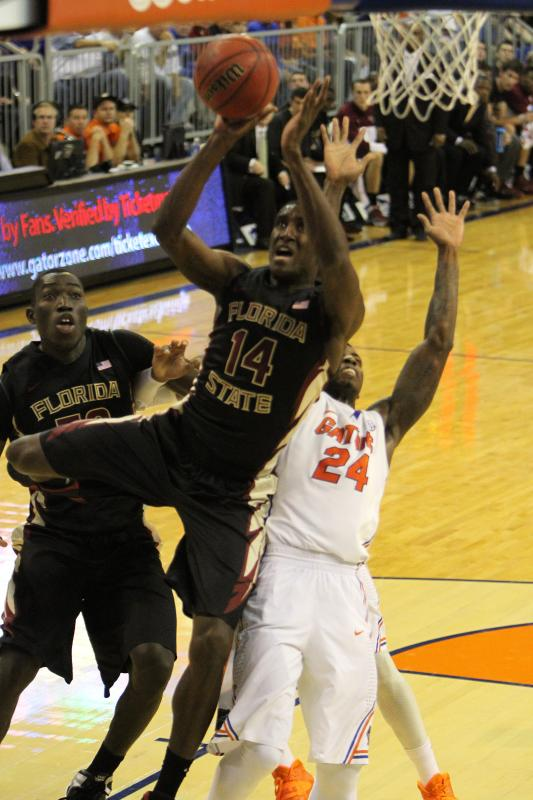

Personal information
- Born: 14 October 1990 (age 35) London, England
- Listed height: 6 ft 9 in (2.06 m)
- Listed weight: 220 lb (100 kg)

Career information
- High school: Canon Palmer Catholic School (London, England); Worcester Academy (Worcester, Massachusetts)
- College: Polk State (2010–2012); Florida State (2012–2014)
- NBA draft: 2014: undrafted
- Playing career: 2014–2023
- Position: Power forward / center

Career history
- 2014–2015: Karlsruhe
- 2015–2016: Peristeri
- 2016: Holargos
- 2017: Araberri
- 2017–2018: Worcester Wolves
- 2018–2019: Luleå
- 2019: Earthfriends Tokyo Z
- 2020: Valladolid
- 2021: Rueil Athletic Club
- 2021: Surrey Scorchers
- 2021–2022: Sanat Mes Rafsanjan
- 2022: Elan Coton
- 2023: Étoile Sportive du Sahel
- 2023: Gaiteros del Zulia

Career highlights
- BBL All-Defensive First Team (2018); Greek 2nd Division Top Rebounder (2016)

Robert Gilchrist (born 14 October 1990) is a professional basketball player. Gilchrist was born in London, England and played his college career in the United States.

== High school / college career ==
After graduating from Worcester Academy in the U.S. state of Massachusetts, Gilchrist played two years for Polk State College in Winter Haven, Florida, where he earned an associate degree in business administration. Gilchrist then played for two years for Florida State University, where he earned a bachelor's degree in social science. Gilchrist started 24 games at the small forward and power forward positions. Florida State participated in the NIT tournament in both of Gilchrist's seasons.

== Professional career ==
Upon graduation in 2014, Gilchrist began his professional career with BG Karlsruhe in Karlsruhe, Germany.

On 24 September 2015, he signed with Greek A2 club Peristeri in Athens. He averaged 12.2 points, 10.3 rebounds, 2.0 blocks per game.

On 29 September 2016 he signed with Holargos of Greek 2nd Division.

On 28 February 2017 he joined Araberri of the LEB Oro until the end of the season.

On 1 December 2017 Gilchrist joined the Worcester Wolves of the British Basketball League.

During the 2018-19 season, Gilchrist played in the FIBA EuroCup with Swedish team BC Lulea.

A strong season in Sweden led to Gilcheist being signed by Tokyo Z in Japan's B2 League for the 2019-20 season.

Following a short-term contract to play in the BBL Cup with the Surrey Scorchers, Gilchrist joined Sanat Mes Rafsanjan in the Iranian Super League for the remainder of the 2021-22 season.

In November 2022, Gilchrist played for the Beninese club Elan Coton in the 2023 BAL qualification. He scored 13 points in his debut.

== International career ==
In 2015, Gilchrist began playing for the Great Britain Men's National Team, scoring 12 points in his debut vs. New Zealand. Later that same summer, Gilchrist led Great Britain to victory over Portugal in the KIA Autohaag Classic with a 12 point, 10 rebound double-double.

Gilchrist has since represented Great Britain a total of 16 times and has featured in FIBA EuroBasket 2017 Qualifying, FIBA World Cup 2019 Qualifying, and FIBA EuroBasket 2022 Qualifying campaigns. Gilchrist was a member of the Great Britain men's national team that set a programme best seven game FIBA winning streak during the 2018-19 season.

Gilchrist has career averages of 5.9 points and 3.3 rebounds per game for the national team. His .640 2FG% is the highest two-point field goal percentage in Great Britain Men's National Team history.

In 2018, Gilchrist was selected to represent England at the 2018 Commonwealth Games in Gold Coast, Australia.
