= Jorge Pacheco-Ortiz =

Puerto Rican basketball player

No. 12 – Atléticos de San Germán
- Position: Point guard
- League: BSN

Personal information
- Born: June 21, 1998 (age 28) Ponce, Puerto Rico
- Listed height: 6 ft 0 in (1.83 m)
- Listed weight: 190 lb (86 kg)

Career information
- College: Liberty (2016–2020)
- NBA draft: 2020: undrafted
- Playing career: 2020–present

Career history
- 2020: Leones de Ponce
- 2021: Brujos de Guayama
- 2021–2022: Grises de Humacao
- 2022–2025: Indios de Mayagüez
- 2026–present: Atléticos de San Germán

Career highlights
- BSN Rookie of the Year (2021)

Jorge 'Georgie' Pacheco-Ortiz (born June 21, 1998) is a Puerto Rican professional basketball player for the Atléticos de San Germán of Baloncesto Superior Nacional (BSN). He played college basketball for the Liberty Flames. He is part of the Puerto Rico national team.
