= Chris Brady (basketball) =

Puerto Rican-American basketball player

No. 43 – Atléticos de San Germán
- Position: Center / Power Forward
- League: BSN

Personal information
- Born: September 15, 1995 (age 31) Greenlawn, New York
- Listed height: 6 ft 10 in (2.08 m)
- Listed weight: 250 lb (113 kg)

Career information
- High school: Harborfields (Greenlawn, New York)
- College: Monmouth (2013–2017)
- NBA draft: 2017: undrafted
- Playing career: 2017–present

Career history
- 2017: White Wings Hanau
- 2018: Atléticos de San Germán
- 2018–2019: Fukushima Firebonds
- 2019–2020: Santeros de Aguada
- 2020–2021: Yamagata Wyverns
- 2021–2022: Cariduros de Fajardo
- 2022–2023: KPA
- 2023–2024: Cariduros de Fajardo
- 2025–present: Atléticos de San Germán

Christopher Gerard Brady (born September 15, 1995) is a Puerto Rican-American basketball player for Atléticos de San Germán of the Baloncesto Superior Nacional (BSN). He played college basketball for the Monmouth Hawks men's basketball team.

== High school career ==
Brady attended Harborfields High School. While in high school, he averaged 5.5 points, 7.9 rebounds, 4.6 blocks and 1.6 assists per game and he led Harborfields to a New York State Class A Championship, Suffolk County Championship and Long Island Championship in 2012. They were also New York state federation finalists while he was there.

== College career ==
Brady joined the Monmouth Hawks men's basketball in the 2013–14 season, In his freshman season, he averaged 3.1 points, 2.9 rebounds and 0.3 assists per game. In his sophomore year, he averaged 4 points, 3 rebounds and 0.2 assists per game. In his junior year, he averaged 6.6 points, 5.9 rebounds and 0.3 assists per game. In his senior year, he averaged 9 points, 6.5 rebounds and 0.4 assists per game.

== Professional career ==
In 2017, he started his professional career with the White Wings Hanau in Germany, where he averaged 9.76 points, 4.88 rebounds and 0.97 assists per game. In 2018, he moved to the Atléticos de San Germán in Puerto Rico where he averaged 3.1 points, 2.79 rebounds and 0.38 assists per game. He moved to the Santeros de Aguada in December 2019. Brady averaged 9.3 points, 3.8 rebounds and 1.3 assists per game. On September 11, 2020, Brady signed with the Yamagata Wyverns of the B.League.

In 2021, Brady signed with Cariduros de Fajardo of the Baloncesto Superior Nacional (BSN) in Puerto Rico, for the 2021–2022 season.

In November 2022, Brady joined Kenyan champions KPA for the 2023 BAL qualification.

== National team career ==
Brady represented the Puerto Rican Basketball National team at the 2019 FIBA Basketball World Cup where he averaged 0.7 points and 1.4 rebounds.
