= Dolphins BC =

Dolphins
- Leagues: Botswana Basketball League
- Stadium: Botswana National Stadium
- Location: Gaborone, Botswana
- Main sponsor: UBSB
- Team manager: Goaba Mooki
- Head coach: Auguste Siedjou Nouwou and Mafhoko Pako Monagen
- Team captain: Kesaobaka NDAWANYANA
- Ownership: Antonio DePína
- Championships: 2015, 2017, 2018, 2023, 2025, 2026
Home

Dolphins Basketball Club, also known as simply Phins or Dolphins, is a basketball team based in Gaborone, Botswana. The team plays in the Botswana Basketball League (BBL) and has won the league championship most recently in 2023.

In 2020 and 2023, the Dolphins played in the Road to BAL, the qualifying tournaments for the Basketball Africa League (BAL).

In the ending of 2023, the Dolphins was acquired by Liberian-Cape Verdean businessman Antonio DePína.

== Honours ==
Botswana Basketball League

- Winners: 2015, 2017, 2018, 2023, 2025, 2026

== In African competitions ==
BAL Qualifiers (4 appearance)

2020 – First Round
2024 – First Round
2026 - First Round
2027 - Second Round

== Players ==
=== Current roster ===
Note: Flags indicate national team eligibility at FIBA-sanctioned events. Players may hold other non-FIBA nationalities not displayed.

Dolphins roster
Players
Coaches

Pos.	No.	Nat.	Name	Ht.	Age
SF	1	(Zimbabwe)	Ndyara, Tanaka	1.85 m (6 ft 1 in)	24 – 20 October 2002
G	3	(Botswana)	Ndawanyana, Kesaobaka	1.90 m (6 ft 3 in)	33 – 9 November 1993
G	5	(Botswana)	Ramabu, Botsile Wilson	2.03 m (6 ft 8 in)	25 – 5 March 2001
G	6	(Botswana)	Gaborone, Thuto Taelo	1.87 m (6 ft 2 in)	34 – 13 August 1992
G	7	(United States)	Collins, Paris	1.93 m (6 ft 4 in)	31 – 26 July 1995
SF	8	(United States)	Omeke Jr., Ezeka	1.93 m (6 ft 4 in)	29 – 8 December 1996
PF	9	(Botswana)	Mbaiwa, Joshua Bongani	1.96 m (6 ft 5 in)	22 – 2 June 2004
G	12	(Botswana)	Chinga, John	1.85 m (6 ft 1 in)	27 – 2 May 1999
SF	22	(Botswana)	Magowe, Keone	1.90 m (6 ft 3 in)	29 – 9 March 1997
C	23	(Tanzania)	Felesian, Fotius Ngaiza	2.06 m (6 ft 9 in)	24 – 14 August 2002
G	24	(Botswana)	Morwaagoleng, Thebe Laurance	1.85 m (6 ft 1 in)	36 – 13 August 1990
F	30	(Botswana)	Ralegoreng, Lone Darabile	2.03 m (6 ft 8 in)	27 – 8 January 1999

Head coach

- (Botswana) Trynos Moyo

Legend

- (C) Team captain
- Injured

- Roster
Updated: 22 October 2023
