= 2005 FIBA Africa Clubs Champions Cup =

2005 FIBA Africa Champions Cup
20th FIBA Africa Champions Cup

Tournament details
- Host country: Ivory Coast
- Dates: November 26 – December 3
- Teams: 7 (from 53 federations)
- Venues: 3 (in 3 host cities)

Final positions
- Champions: Ivory Coast (3rd title)

Tournament statistics
- MVP: (Ivory Coast) Stéphane Konaté
- Top scorer: (Republic of the Congo) Ngombo 17.57
- Top rebounds: (Angola) Mayombo 6.61
- Top assists: (Nigeria) Ifeanyi 3.38
- PPG (Team): (Republic of the Congo) Inter Club 77.4
- RPG (Team): (Angola) Petro 39
- APG (Team): (Ivory Coast) ABC 14.5

Official website
- Official Website

The 2005 FIBA Africa Basketball Club Championship (20th edition), was an international basketball tournament held in Abidjan, Ivory Coast, from December 13 to 22, 2007. The tournament, organized by FIBA Africa and hosted by Abidjan Basket Club, was contested by 7 teams in a preliminary round robin system followed by a knockout stage by the top four teams.

The tournament was won by Abidjan Basket Club from Ivory Coast.

== Participating teams ==
(Ivory Coast) Abidjan Basket Club
(Guinea) BACK Conakry
(Angola) Interclube
(Angola) Petro Atlético
(Angola) Primeiro de Agosto
(Nigeria) Union Bank

== Preliminary round ==
Times given below are in UTC.

Qualified for the semi-finals

	Team	M	W	L	PF	PA	Diff	P
1.	(Angola) Interclube	5	4	1	479	301	+178	9
2.	(Angola) Primeiro de Agosto	5	4	1	381	346	+35	9
3.	(Ivory Coast) Abidjan Basket Club	5	3	2	348	322	+26	8
4.	(Nigeria) Union Bank	5	2	3	304	312	−8	7
5.	(Angola) Petro Atlético	5	2	3	303	354	−51	7
6.	(Guinea) BACK Conakry	5	1	4	303	354	−51	5

November 26, 2005
20:00

Report

Abidjan BC (Ivory Coast)	59–48	(Guinea) BACK
Scoring by quarter: 11–11, 19–9, 11–20, 18–8
Pts: S.Konaté 14; Rebs: Fofana 9 Asts: n/a		Pts: M.Condé 13; Rebs: S.Condé 8 Asts: n/a

Palais des Sports de Treichville, Abidjan

November 27, 2005
16:00

Report

1º de Agosto (Angola)	73–71	(Angola) Petro Atlético
Scoring by quarter: 20–18, 24–21, 18–22, 11–10
Pts: C.Almeida 13; Rebs: Muzadi 11; Asts: n/a		Pts: Jordão 18; Rebs: Mascarenhas 9 Asts: n/a

Palais des Sports de Treichville, Abidjan

November 27, 2005
18:00

Report

Interclube (Angola)	71–70	(Nigeria) Union Bank
Scoring by quarter: 21–15, 15–24, 20–14, 15–17
Pts: H.Domingos 15; Rebs: Diop 12; Asts: n/a		Pts: Ekpenyong 23; Rebs: Ugboaja 11; Asts: Vidal 7

Palais des Sports de Treichville, Abidjan

November 28, 2005
16:00

Report

1º de Agosto (Angola)	80–75	(Nigeria) Union Bank
Scoring by quarter: 24–25, 19–8, 21–23, 16–19
Pts: Nnaji 17; Rebs: Nnaji 13; Asts: Lutonda, Ângelo 5		Pts: Ekpenyong 20; Rebs: Ugboaja, Ninmol 7 Asts: Ifeanyi 8

Palais des Sports de Treichville, Abidjan

November 28, 2005
18:00

Report

BACK (Guinea)	56–69	(Angola) Interclube
Scoring by quarter: 11–15, 14–16, 14–20, 17–18
Pts: S.Condé 12; Rebs: S.Condé, Mohamed 11; Asts: A.Keita 3		Pts: F.Albano 22; Rebs: Diop 11; Asts: Swingue 5

Palais des Sports de Treichville, Abidjan

November 28, 2005
20:00

Report

Petro Atlético (Angola)	60–69	(Ivory Coast) Abidjan BC
Scoring by quarter: n/a
Pts: Crooks 18; Rebs: H.Ortet 9 Asts: Mílton 2		Pts: Touali, S.Konaté 16; Rebs: Touali 9 Asts: Touali, Bangoura 3

Palais des Sports de Treichville, Abidjan

November 29, 2005
16:00

Report

Petro Atlético (Angola)	70–63	(Angola) Interclube
Scoring by quarter: 24–19, 19–16, 17–14, 10–14
Pts: Gerson 21; Rebs: Jordão, Víctor 6 Asts: Crooks 4		Pts: F.Albano 19; Rebs: Michel 9 Asts: n/a

Palais des Sports de Treichville, Abidjan

November 29, 2005
18:00

Report

BACK (Guinea)	63–85	(Nigeria) Union Bank
Scoring by quarter: 8–24, 18–25, 20–18, 17–18
Pts: A.Keita 20; Rebs: M.Condé, Mohamed 5 Asts: A.Keita, S.Condé 3		Pts: Ugboaja 21; Rebs: Ugboaja 10; Asts: Ifeanyi 4

Palais des Sports de Treichville, Abidjan

November 29, 2005
20:00

Report

Abidjan BC (Ivory Coast)	69–77	(Angola) 1º de Agosto
Scoring by quarter: 19–23, 21–23, 14–11, 15–20
Pts: S.Konaté 22; Rebs: Bangoura 8 Asts: Touali 4		Pts: Lutonda 17; Rebs: Ângelo 8 Asts: Olímpio 2

Palais des Sports de Treichville, Abidjan

November 30, 2005
16:00

Report

Petro Atlético (Angola)	92–69	(Guinea) BACK
Scoring by quarter: 19–15, 24–21, 26–14, 23–19
Pts: H.Ortet 15; Rebs: Jordão, L.Costa 8 Asts: Mílton 5		Pts: A.Keita 18; Rebs: M.Condé 6 Asts: four players 2

Palais des Sports de Treichville, Abidjan

November 30, 2005
18:00

Report

1º de Agosto (Angola)	72–81	(Angola) Interclube
Scoring by quarter: 11–16, 19–20, 22–18, 20–27
Pts: Lutonda 18; Rebs: Nnaji 9 Asts: Olímpio 3		Pts: F.Albano 25; Rebs: Mayombo 6 Asts: Swingue 5

Palais des Sports de Treichville, Abidjan

November 30, 2005
20:00

Report

Union Bank (Nigeria)	73–78	(Ivory Coast) Abidjan BC
Scoring by quarter: 12–20, 16–19, 27–16, 18–23
Pts: Ifeanyi, Ninmol 13; Rebs: Ifeanyi 6 Asts: Ifeanyi 6		Pts: S.Konaté 16; Rebs: Bangoura 9 Asts: four players 1

Palais des Sports de Treichville, Abidjan

December 01, 2005
16:00

Report

Petro Atlético (Angola)	70–73	(Nigeria) Union Bank
Scoring by quarter: 14–21, 12–20, 20–20, 24–12
Pts: Crooks, C.Morais 11; Rebs: Cristo 7 Asts: Gerson 3		Pts: Gyang-Gyang 17; Rebs: Ekpenyong 10; Asts: Ekpenyong, Ifeanyi 3

Palais des Sports de Treichville, Abidjan

December 01, 2005
18:00

Report

BACK (Guinea)	38–97	(Angola) 1º de Agosto
Scoring by quarter: 9–19, 8–29, 10–28, 11–21
Pts: M.Condé 10; Rebs: S.Condé 9 Asts: Bah, A.Keita 1		Pts: Ricardino 24; Rebs: J.Neto 14; Asts: E.Camacho 5

Palais des Sports de Treichville, Abidjan

December 01, 2005
20:00

Report

Abidjan BC (Ivory Coast)	51–55	(Angola) Interclube
Scoring by quarter: 13–11, 11–20, 12–12, 15–12
Pts: S.Konaté 13; Rebs: Diop 6 Asts: S.Konaté 3		Pts: F.Albano 17; Rebs: Kabangu 6 Asts: E.Ventura 2

Palais des Sports de Treichville, Abidjan

== Knockout stage ==
Semi finals
Friday, 2 December 20:00
(Angola) 1º de Agosto	67
(Ivory Coast) Abidjan BC	70
Friday, 2 December 18:00
(Angola) Interclube	74
(Nigeria) Union Bank	58

Final
Saturday, 3 December 18:30
(Ivory Coast) Abidjan BC	67
(Angola) Interclube	66
3rd place
Saturday, 3 December 16:30
(Angola) 1º de Agosto	103
(Nigeria) Union Bank	67

=== Classification ===
December 02, 2005
09:00

Report

Inter Club (Republic of the Congo)	69–59	(Guinea) BACK
Scoring by quarter: 17–16, 15–11, 17–17, 20–15
Pts: n/a Rebs: n/a Asts: n/a		Pts: n/a Rebs: n/a Asts: n/a

Palais des Sports de Treichville, Abidjan

December 02, 2005
16:00

Report

Inter Club (Republic of the Congo)	67–88	(Angola) Petro Atlético
Scoring by quarter: 24–33, 18–16, 11–17, 14–22
Pts: Kondzy 13; Rebs: Kadima, Bongou 6 Asts: Kouguere, Elenga 2		Pts: C.Morais 18; Rebs: Leonel 11; Asts: Mílton 11

Palais des Sports de Treichville, Abidjan

December 03, 2005
16:00

Report

Petro Atlético (Angola)	92–69	(Guinea) BACK
Scoring by quarter: 19–15, 24–21, 26–14, 23–19
Pts: n/a Rebs: n/a Asts: n/a		Pts: n/a Rebs: n/a Asts: n/a

Palais des Sports de Treichville, Abidjan

=== Semifinals ===
December 02, 2005
20:00

Report

1º de Agosto (Angola)	67–70	(Ivory Coast) Abidjan BC
Scoring by quarter: 22–19, 15–18, 15–19, 15–14
Pts: n/a Rebs: n/a Asts: n/a		Pts: n/a Rebs: n/a Asts: n/a

Palais des Sports de Treichville, Abidjan

December 02, 2005
18:00

Report

Interclube (Angola)	74–58	(Nigeria) Union Bank
Scoring by quarter: 13–16, 23–6, 15–16, 23–20
Pts: F.Albano 24; Rebs: Diop 12; Asts: E.Ventura 2		Pts: Ugboaja 17; Rebs: Ekpenyong 9 Asts: Ifeanyi 3

Palais des Sports de Treichville, Abidjan

=== Bronze medal game ===
December 03, 2005
16:30

Report

1º de Agosto (Angola)	103–67	(Nigeria) Union Bank
Scoring by quarter: 31–20, 26–18, 26–13, 20–16
Pts: E.Camacho 17; Rebs: four players 3 Asts: Lutonda 4		Pts: Gyang-Gyang 14; Rebs: Gyang-Gyang, Ninmol 4 Asts: n/a

Palais des Sports de Treichville, Abidjan

=== Gold medal game ===
December 03, 2005
18:30

Report

Abidjan BC (Ivory Coast)	67–66	(Angola) Interclube
Scoring by quarter: 16–13, 16–17, 16–18, 19–18
Pts: Touali 14; Rebs: Touali, Bangoura 5 Asts: Besse 3		Pts: F.Albano 21; Rebs: Mayombo 9 Asts: 0

Palais des Sports de Treichville, Abidjan

== Final standings ==
Rank	Team	Record
Gold medal	(Ivory Coast) Abidjan Basket Club	5–2
Silver medal	(Angola) Interclube	5–2
Bronze medal	(Angola) Primeiro de Agosto	5–2
4	(Nigeria) Union Bank	2–5
5	(Angola) Petro Atlético	4–3
6	(Guinea) BACK Conakry	1–6
7	(Republic of the Congo) Inter Club Brazzaville	1–1

ABC roster
Abou Fofana, Aboud Bakayoko, Aka Diamah, Aristide Yao, Blaise Amalabian, Eric Affi, Guy Touali, Jean Besse, Kouamé Abo, Morlaye Bangoura, N'Dri Kouakou, Stéphane Konaté, Coach:

== All Tournament Team ==
2005 FIBA Africa Clubs Champions Cup

Abidjan Basket Club
1st Title

Most Valuable Player
(Ivory Coast) Stéphane Konaté

== See also ==
2005 FIBA Africa Championship
