= 2027 BAL season =

6th season of the Basketball Africa League

- League: Basketball Africa League
- Sport: Basketball
- Duration: TBA
- Games: 42
- Teams: 12

Seasons
- ← 2026 (Season 6) 2028 (Season 8) →

The 2027 BAL season, also known as BAL Season 7, is the upcoming 7th season of the Basketball Africa League (BAL). The playoffs and finals will be held at a to be determined venue. The RSSB Tigers from Rwanda are the defending champions.

== Teams ==
Location of teams of the 2027 BAL season .

=== Method of qualification and statistics ===
Team	Method of qualification	Date of qualification	App.	Previous year	Cons.	Best performance	Ref.
(Tunisia) US Monastir	2025–26 Championnat Pro A		6th	2025	1	Champions (2022)	
(Angola) Petro de Luanda	2025–26 Angolan Basketball League		7th	2026	6	Champions (2024)	
(Egypt) Al Ahly	2025–26 Egyptian Basketball Premier League		4th	2026	2	Champions (2023)	
(Senegal) AS Douanes	2026 NM1 season		4th	2024	1	Runners-up (2023)	
(Rwanda) APR	2026 RBL season	August 25, 2026	3rd	2025	1	Third place (2025)	
(Nigeria) TBA	2026 NBBF Premier League						
(Libya) Al-Ittihad Tripoli	Elite 16 West Division finalist	November 14, 2026	1st	—	1	Debut	
(Ivory Coast) JCA Kings	Elite 16 West Division finalist	November 14, 2026	2nd	2026	2	Group phase (2026)	
(To be determined) TBA	Elite 16 East Division finalist						
(To be determined) TBA	Elite 16 East Division finalist						

== See also ==
- 2027 Women's Basketball League Africa
