= Djabal Basket Iconi =

Comorian basketball team

- League: Comoros Basketball Championship
- Founded: 1979
- Location: Iconi, Comoros
- Head coach: Fakri Mohamed

Djabal Basket Iconi is a semi-professional basketball team based in the city of Iconi in the Comoros. The team was founded in 1979 by Ali “Foundi Carnet” Abdallah who was one of the best players of his generation in Madagascar. Abdallah returned to the Comoros in the 1960s to learn basketball. Djabal is one of the most decorated teams in the country, having won five national and eight regional championships. Djabal is currently coached by Fakri Mohamed, one of the most important players in the country's history.

In October 2022, Djabal represented Comoros in the 2023 BAL qualification, losing two games to KPA and COSPN.

== Players ==
=== 2022 roster ===
The following was the roster for the Road to BAL 2023.

Note: Flags indicate national team eligibility at FIBA-sanctioned events. Players may hold other non-FIBA nationalities not displayed.

Djabal Basket Iconi roster
Players
Coaches

Pos.	No.	Nat.	Name	Ht.	Wt.	Age
	4	(Comoros)	Youssouf, Said			33 – 23 November 1991
	5	(Comoros)	Farid, Mbaraka			26 – 7 May 1998
	7	(Comoros)	Mchangama, Abdou Omar			28 – 20 August 1996
	8	(Comoros)	Mze Mmadi, Mdaouhoma			33 – 4 January 1992
	9	(Comoros)	Hassane Ben, Ali Ahamada			19 – 21 April 2005
	11	(Comoros)	Aboudou, Andjibou			23 – 29 August 2001
	12	(Comoros)	Aboubacar, Youssouf			26 – 6 May 1998
	13	(Comoros)	Chaher, Said Ali			27 – 13 July 1997
	14	(Comoros)	Hamdi Abdillah, Al Swabah			27 – 19 May 1997
	15	(Comoros)	Soulaimana, Mohamed Ali			41 – 17 February 1984
	16	(Comoros)	Soilihi, Mbechezi			31 – 9 June 1993
	17	(Comoros)	Onthoumane, Toihir			25 – 1 August 1999

Head coach

(Comoros) Fakri Mohamed

Legend

- (C) Team captain
- Injured
