= CSA Treichville =

Ivorian basketball club

- Nickname: Club Sportif d'Abidjan Treichville
- League: Ivorian Basketball Championship
- Founded: 1998
- Arena: Palais des Sports de Treichville
- Capacity: 7,000
- Location: Abidjan, Ivory Coast
- Championships: Women's; 4 Ivorian Leagues; 5 Ivorian Cups
- Website: csabasketball.net

CSA Treichville is an Ivorian men's and women's basketball club based in the Treichville neighbourhood in Abidjan. Established in 1998, the team plays in the Ivorian Basketball Championship, the national highest level league. The women's team has won the national championship four times.

== Honours ==
=== Men's ===
Ligue d'Or

- Runners-up (1): 2020

=== Women's ===
Ivorian Basketball Championship

- Champions (4): 2009, 2010, 2012, 2016

Ivorian National Cup

- Champions (5): 2006, 2007, 2008, 2009, 2010
