= Botswana Basketball League =

- Organising body: Botswana Basketball Federation
- Founded: 1995
- Country: Botswana
- Number of teams: 6
- Level on pyramid: 1
- Promotion to: Platinium Warriors
- Relegation to: Lions BC
- International cup: Basketball Africa League (BAL)
- Current champions: Dolphins (2026)
- President: Mothusi Thipe
- TV partners: Sports Center BW (Youtube)

The Botswana Basketball League is the premier basketball league for men's clubs in Botswana, organised by the Botswana Basketball Association (BBA). The league consist out of twelve teams. As of December 2019, the defending champions are Dolphins.

The champions of the BBL are able to play in the qualifying rounds of the Basketball Africa League (BAL).

== History ==
Basketball in Botswana was played informally by mission schools from 1965. In the early 1990s, the first organised games were played. In 1995, the Botswana Basketball Association (BBA) was founded.

The league has allowed university teams since 2022.

== Current teams ==
Location of teams in Botswana Basketball League

The following were the six teams for the 2026–27 season:

- Dolphins
- Lions BC
- Jwaneng Bullets
- Police
- BDF V
- UB Relics

== Champions ==
- 2009: Troopers
- 2010: Troopers
- 2011: unknown
- 2012: Spartans
- 2013: Troopers
- 2014: Troopers
- 2015:Dolphins
- 2016: unknown
- 2017: Dolphins
- 2018: Dolphins
- 2019: unknown
- 2020: Not held
- 2021: Not held
- 2022: Police
- 2023: Dolphins
- 2024: BDF V
- 2025: Dolphins
- 2026: Dolphins

== Finals (since 2013) ==
Season	Champions	Runners-up	Finals score	Third place	Ref.
2013	Troopers	Spartans			
2014	Troopers	Dolphins			
2015	Dolphins	Troopers		Spartans	
2016					
2017					
2018	Dolphins	Police			
2019					
2020	Not held due to the COVID-19 pandemic				
2021	Not held due to the COVID-19 pandemic				
2022	Police	Dolphins	70–50		
2023	Dolphins	Delta Force	2–0*		
2024	BDF V	Orapa Juggernauts	2–1*		
2025	Dolphins	Police	2–0		

* denotes the finals were played in a best-of-three series.
