= SOA (basketball) =

- League: Ivorian Basketball Championship
- Founded: 1932
- Location: Yamoussoukro, Ivory Coast
- Chairman: Julien N’Dri Kouamé; Philippe Mangou
- Head coach: Franck Sylva
- Championships: 1 Ivorian Leagues
Home	Away

Société Omnisports de l'Armée, commonly known as SOA, is an Ivorian basketball club based in Yamoussoukro. The team competes in the Ivorian Basketball Championship and was founded in 1932. The basketball section is a part of the same-named multi sports club.

In 2021, SOA won its first-ever Ivorian championship after defeating ABC Fighters in two games. Asshe Kokoun was named the Most Valuable Player (MVP) of the tournament.

== Honours ==
Ivorian Basketball Championship

- Champions (1): 2021

Ivorian Basketball SuperCup

- Winners (1): 2024

== Players ==
=== Current roster ===
The following is the SOA roster in the 2022 BAL Qualifying Tournaments.

Note: Flags indicate national team eligibility at FIBA-sanctioned events. Players may hold other non-FIBA nationalities not displayed.

SOA roster
Players
Coaches

Pos.	No.	Nat.	Name
	0	(Ivory Coast)	Lawore, Djonathan
	1	(Ivory Coast)	Dieng, Siré
G	2	(Ivory Coast)	Kra, Ulrich
	3	(Ivory Coast)	Kouakou, N'Dri
PF	4	(Ivory Coast)	Kone, Désiré
SF	5	(Ivory Coast)	Oka, Loukou
	6	(Mali)	Guindo, Moussa
PG	10	(Ivory Coast)	Agole, Gomon
C	11	(Ivory Coast)	Traore, Aboubakar
	12	(Ivory Coast)	Koukoun, Asshe
G	15	(Ivory Coast)	Kouadio, Kouadio
G	21	(United States)	Cook, Da'Quan
F	23	(Democratic Republic of the Congo)	Ebondo Tambwe, Rodrigue
C	33	(Serbia)	Tubak, Dragan

Head coach

- (Ivory Coast) Coulibaly Christian Larry

Legend

- (C) Team captain
- Injured

- Roster
Updated: December 11, 2021

== Head coaches ==
- Franck Sylva
- Coulibaly Larry
- Sosthène Koné: (2023-present)
