= Atléticos de San Germán =

Puerto Rican basketball team

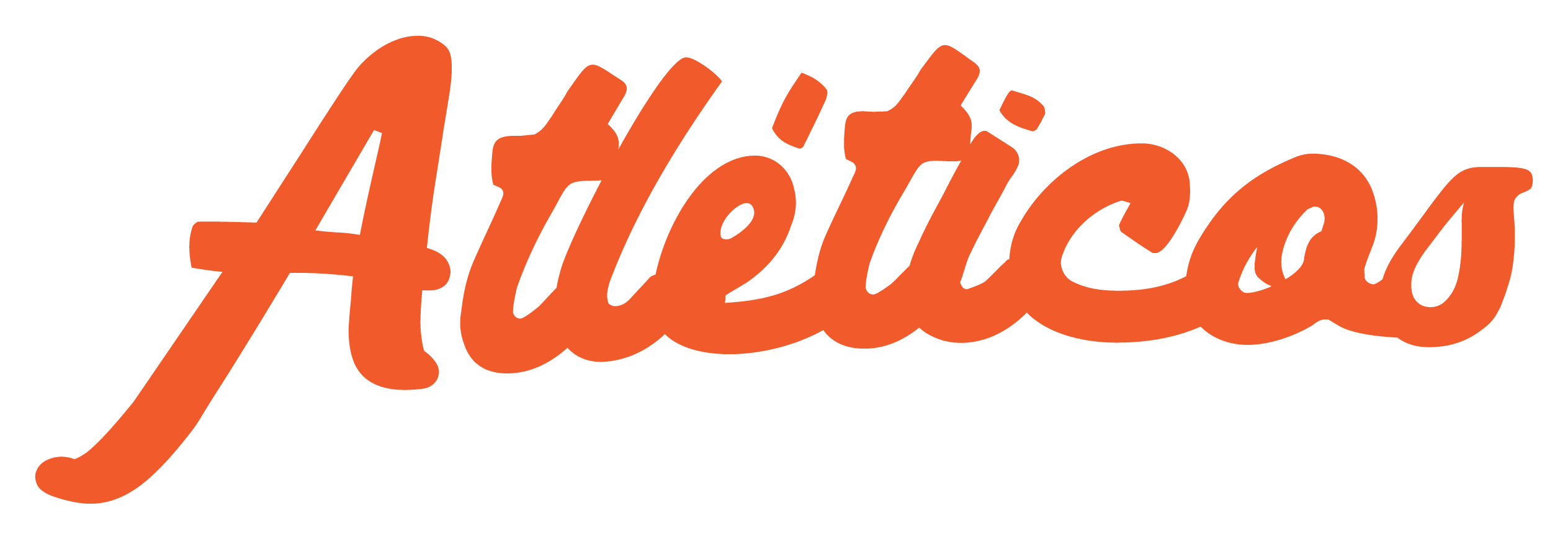
- Nickname: El monstruo anaranjado (The Orange Monster)
- League: Baloncesto Superior Nacional
- Founded: 1930; 96 years ago
- History: Atléticos de San Germán; 1930–present
- Arena: Arquelio Torres Ramírez Coliseum
- Capacity: 5,000
- Location: San Germán, Puerto Rico
- Team colors: Orange, Black, White
- Head coach: Eddie Casiano
- Assistants: Manolo Cintrón; Héctor Porrata
- Ownership: José Rivera; Juan Ramón
- BSN titles: 14 (1932, 1938, 1939, 1941, 1942, 1943, 1947, 1948, 1949, 1950, 1985, 1991, 1994, 1997)
- Website: Official website
Home	Away	Alternate

Atléticos de San Germán are a basketball club of the Baloncesto Superior Nacional (BSN) based in San Germán, Puerto Rico.

Founded in the 1930s after the amalgamation of the old San Germán team and the Farmacia Martín team, the team is one of the original BSN franchises. The Athletics play their home games at the Arquelio Torres Ramírez Coliseum. The franchise's fourteen championships are tied with the Leones de Ponces for the second most of any BSN franchise, and account for 16.8% of all BSN championships since the league's tournaments began in 1930. This makes the "Atléticos de San Germán" the most successful basketball club to date of all professional sports franchises in the western part of Puerto Rico and the town itself is known as "La cuna del baloncesto en Puerto Rico" (the cradle of basketball in Puerto Rico).

Their mascot "The Orange Monster" is a part of the team's image, featuring prominently in its logo and being the club nickname for decades. The team's nickname is "El monstruo anaranjado" "The Orange Monster")

The Athletics rose again after struggling through the 1950s, 1960s and 1970s to win a championship in 1985 over the Mets de Guaynabo. Following the 1985 championship, San Germán began to develop many young, talented players who would later lead them to three more championships within the next twelve years.

== History ==
The team was born from Felicio Torregrosa's work at the Polytechnic Institute of San Germán. During the 1930s and 40s the team was undoubtedly the best in the league, winning ten championships between 1932 and 1950, including many by local basketball legend Arquelio Torres Ramírez. Torres Ramírez is fondly remembered as "El Pequeño Titán" (The little titan) and is still San Germán's most notorious player. After his sudden death in 1949, the team went in a downwards spiral; making several finals appearances but failing to win a championship until the aforementioned one in 1985. The first title after 1985 came in 1991 when development of the talented young players peaked. Under the guidance and stellar play of José "Piculín" Ortíz the "Atléticos" won their second championship in six years. The 1991 team, however was quite different from the '85 team. It was very young (with the exception of Ortíz) and for that reason it had received, during the latter years of the 80's decade, the nickname of "Los Nenes" (The boys or "The kids"). It included Eddie Casiano, Nelson Quiñones, Luis Allende, Yan Garcia and Oscar Santiago, the core of the Atléticos who won the championship in 1994.

Soon after, public feuds between Ortíz and the team owner led the star center to move to Europe to play in Greece. The young players then reaching the height of their careers then won another championship for San Germán. In 1997, Eddie Casiano carried the team to victory over an underdog Carolina team. The great play of Quiñones and Casiano led San Germán to their league leading 14th championship.

A change of ownership and more disputes eventually led San Germán to trade Eddie Casiano to the Leones de Ponce. Ortíz returned from Europe, but was then traded to the Cangrejeros de Santurce. Both players have won championships with their respective teams while San Germán is still in the hunt for the 15th championship.

== Players ==
=== Current roster ===
Note: Flags indicate national team eligibility at FIBA-sanctioned events. Players may hold other non-FIBA nationalities not displayed.

Atléticos de San Germán roster
Players
Coaches

Pos.	No.	Nat.	Name	Ht.	Wt.	Age
SG	0	(United States) (Puerto Rico)	Hopping, Rico (DC)	6 ft 5 in (1.96 m)	200 lb (91 kg)	25 – November 21, 2000
C	1	(Puerto Rico) (United States)	Torres, Julián (DC)	6 ft 9 in (2.06 m)	264 lb (120 kg)	29 – March 18, 1997
G	8	(Puerto Rico)	Matos, Jorge	6 ft 1 in (1.85 m)	185 lb (84 kg)	33 – April 30, 1992
F	9	(Puerto Rico)	Hargis, Marlon	6 ft 7 in (2.01 m)	205 lb (93 kg)	26 – April 4, 1999
PG	11	(Puerto Rico)	Curbelo, André	6 ft 0 in (1.83 m)	175 lb (79 kg)	24 – October 13, 2001
G	12	(Puerto Rico)	Pacheco-Ortiz, Jorge	6 ft 2 in (1.88 m)	200 lb (91 kg)	27 – June 21, 1998
F	14	(Puerto Rico)	Torres, Jorge	6 ft 5 in (1.96 m)	210 lb (95 kg)	25 – April 19, 2000
F	15	(Puerto Rico)	Branch, Onzie	6 ft 7 in (2.01 m)	215 lb (98 kg)	34 – October 8, 1991
G/F	24	(United States) (Puerto Rico)	Bull, Joseph (DC)	6 ft 5 in (1.96 m)	205 lb (93 kg)	28 – January 1, 1998
G	30	(Puerto Rico)	Pizarro, Christian	5 ft 11 in (1.80 m)	175 lb (79 kg)	31 – February 16, 1995
F/C	34	(United States)	Perkins, Nick (I)	6 ft 8 in (2.03 m)	255 lb (116 kg)	29 – October 15, 1996
PF	35	(United States) (Puerto Rico)	Gordon, Antonio (DC)	6 ft 9 in (2.06 m)	220 lb (100 kg)	25 – March 6, 2001
F/C	41	(United States)	Harrell, Montrezl (I)	6 ft 8 in (2.03 m)	240 lb (110 kg)	32 – January 24, 1994
F/C	43	(Puerto Rico)	Brady, Chris (injured)	6 ft 10 in (2.08 m)	250 lb (110 kg)	30 – September 15, 1995
SG	55	(United States)	Hamilton, Alex (I)	6 ft 4 in (1.93 m)	195 lb (88 kg)	32 – October 5, 1993

Head coach

- (Puerto Rico) Eddie Casiano

Assistant coach(es)

- (Puerto Rico) Manolo Cintrón
- (Puerto Rico) Héctor Porrata

Legend

- (C) Team captain
- (DC) Dual citizenship
- (I) Import player
- Injured

- Roster
Updated: 23 March 2026

=== Depth chart ===
Pos.	Starting 5	Bench 1	Bench 2
C	Montrezl Harrell	Antonio Gordon	Julián Torres
PF	Nick Perkins	Onzie Branch	Chris Brady (injured)
SF	Alex Hamilton	Marlon Hargis	Jorge Torres
SG	Jorge Pacheco-Ortiz	Jorge Matos	Joseph Bull
PG	André Curbelo	Christian Pizarro	Rico Hopping

== Notable players ==
- (United States) Tu Holloway
- (United States) O. J. Mayo
- (Sierra Leone) (Libya) Alpha Bangura
- (United States) Earl Barron
- (Puerto Rico) Eddie Casiano
- (United States) Norris Cole
- (Puerto Rico) José Ortiz
- (United States) Paris Bass
- (United States) (Jordan) Rondae Hollis-Jefferson
- (United States) Will Barton
- (United States) Montrezl Harrell
