= Stéphane Konaté =

Ivorian basketball player (born 1980)

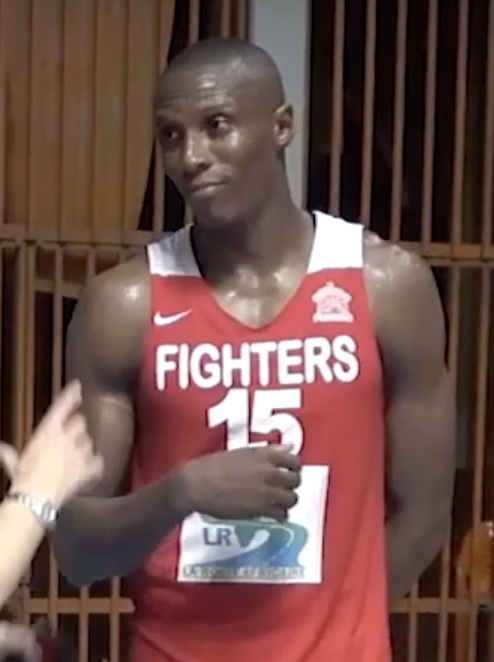
- Konaté in 2022

Jeunesse Club d'Abidjan
- Title: Head coach
- League: Ligue d'Or

Personal information
- Born: 23 August 1980 (age 46) Bouaké, Ivory Coast
- Listed height: 1.91 m (6 ft 3 in)
- Listed weight: 79 kg (174 lb)

Career information
- High school: I.N.J.S. (Abidjan, Ivory Coast)
- NBA draft: 2002: undrafted
- Playing career: 2002–2023
- Position: Shooting guard
- Number: 15
- Coaching career: 2023–present

Career history

Playing
- 2002–2005: Africa Sports
- 2005–2008: ABC
- 2008–2010: ASE Essaouira
- 2010–2011: ABC
- 2011–2012: Palencia
- 2013–2014: Gezira
- 2014–2023: ABC / ABC Fighters
- 2021: AS Police

Coaching
- 2023–2024: HBUC
- 2024–present: Jeunesse Club d'Abidjan

Career highlights
- As player: FIBA Africa Cup champion (2005); FIBA Africa Cup MVP (2005); FIBA Africa Cup Scoring Champion (2014); All-FIBA Africa Cup First Team (2005); All-FIBA Africa Cup Second Team (2014); Egyptian League champion (2014); 16× Ivorian League champion; As head coach: Ivorian League champion (2025); Ivorian Cup winner (2025)
Medals
Men's basketball
Representing Ivory Coast
FIBA AfroBasket
Silver medal – second place	2009 Libya
Silver medal – second place	2021 Kigali

Kinidinnin Stéphane Konaté Sornan (born 23 August 1980) is an Ivorian retired basketball player and current coach. He is the current head coach of Jeunsesse Club d'Abidjan of the Ligue d'Or. Konaté played the majority of his career for the ABC Fighters and for the Ivory Coast national team. He is nticknamed "El Jefe" ("The Chef").

Primarily playing as shooting guard, Konaté is a 18-time Ivorian championship winner and was the FIBA Africa Club Champions Cup MVP, following ABC's championship in 2005.

Konaté has represented the Ivory Coast national team in several AfroBasket tournaments, and helped the Elephants finish as runners-ups in 2009 and 2021.

== Early life ==
Konaté was born in Bouaké, a city in the north of Ivory Coast, and started out playing football.

== Professional career ==
Konaté started his professional career with Africa Sports in 2002, while still attending high school. He played with the team for three seasons. In 2005, he signed with Abidjan Basket Club (abbreviated as ABC).

Konaté won the 2015 FIBA Africa Clubs Champions Cup with ABC. He was also named the Most Valuable Player of the tournament.

In 2008, Konaté signed in Morocco with ASE Essaouira of the Division Excellence.

In the 2011–12 season, Konaté signed with Spanish side Palencia in the LEB Gold. He averaged 2.6 points in five games, playing 10.4 minutes per game.

In the 2013–14 season, Konaté played with Egyptian side Gezira of the Egyptian Basketball Super League.

In 2014, he returned to ABC, later renamed ABC Fighters.

In October 2021, Konaté was on the roster of Malian club AS Police. He had previously received offers from AS Police, but administrative issues prevented making the move. Konaté helped ABC qualify for the 2023 season of the Basketball Africa League (BAL), and played a decisive role in the team's run to the league quarter-finals.

In autumn 2023, Konaté played in another Road to BAL tournament with ABC. After failing to qualify for the semi-finals, he announced his retirement from basketball at age 43. He cited: ""I am satisfied with the achievements I made playing the game and it gladdens me that people refer to me as an African legend."

== National team career ==
Konaté competed as a member of the Côte d'Ivoire national basketball team for the first time at the FIBA Africa Championship 2003. He has since gone on to compete for the team at the FIBA Africa Championship 2005, FIBA Africa Championship 2007, and FIBA Africa Championship 2009. In his most recent tournament, he averaged 8.7 points per game for the Côte d'Ivoire team that won the silver medal at the 2009 African Championship to qualify for the 2010 FIBA World Championship.

== Coaching career ==
Following his retirement from playing, Konaté began his coaching career in 2024 when he coached the university team Houphouët-Boigny Université Club (HBUC) for the 2023–24 season. The following year, he signed with Jeunesse Club d'Abidjan of the Ligue d'Or. He guided his team to the double, winning both the Ligue d'Or and national Cup.

== Honours ==
=== Playing career ===
ABC Fighters

- 16× Ivorian National Championship: (2006, 2007, 2008, 2010, 2011, 2012, 2013, 2014, 2015, 2016, 2017, 2019, 2020, 2022)
- FIBA Africa Club Champions Cup: (2015)

Gezira

- Egyptian Basketball Super League: (2014)

Ivory Coast

- (silver) Runners-up AfroBasket 2009
- (silver) Runners-up AfroBasket 2021

==== Individual awards ====
- FIBA Africa Club Champions Cup MVP: (2015)
- All-FIBA Africa Club Champions Cup Team: (2005)
- Ivorian National Championship Regular Season MVP: (2021)

=== Coaching career ===
- Ligue d'Or: (2025)
- Ivorian Basketball:l Cup: (2025)

== Personal ==
Konaté is married to his wife Marine and has two sons with her. He has been holding annual basketball camps in Korhogo since 2021.

== BAL career statistics ==
Legend
GP	Games played	GS	Games started	MPG	Minutes per game
FG%	Field goal percentage	3P%	3-point field goal percentage	FT%	Free throw percentage
RPG	Rebounds per game	APG	Assists per game	SPG	Steals per game
BPG	Blocks per game	PPG	Points per game	**Bold**	Career high

Year	Team	GP	GS	MPG	FG%	3P%	FT%	RPG	APG	SPG	BPG	PPG
2023	ABC Fighters	6	6	28.8	.385	.394	.852	5.7	2.3	1.0	.2	12.7
