= Ushindzi Club =

Ushindzi
- League: Comoros Basketball Championship
- Founded: 1976
- History: Ushindzi Club; 1976-present
- Location: Ouani, Comoros
- Head coach: Ali Sidi Abdoulwahab
- Championships: 2 Comoros Championship (2015, 2023)

Ushindzi Club is a Comorian basketball club based in Ouani. The club was founded in 1976. The club has participated in the Comoros Basketball Championship and has won the championship in 2015 and 2023. Ushindzi has also won seven regional titles, and played in the FIBA Africa Zone 7 championship in 2016. In the same year, Ushindzi made its debut in the Road to BAL, the qualifying tournaments for the BAL. They lost their two games in Group E against COSPN and the Beau Vallon Heat.

== Honours ==
Comoros Basketball Championship

- Champions (2): 2015, 2023
  - Runners-up (1): 2020

Anjouan Basketball Championship

- Champions (7): 2011, 2015, 2016, 2018, 2019, 2020, 2022

Comoros League Cup

- Winners (1): 2021

== Players ==
=== Current roster ===
The following is Ushindzi Club's roster in the 2024 BAL qualification.

Note: Flags indicate national team eligibility at FIBA-sanctioned events. Players may hold other non-FIBA nationalities not displayed.

Ushindzi roster
Players
Coaches

Pos.	No.	Nat.	Name	Ht.	Age
F	2	(Comoros)	Abdallah, Toihar	1.82 m (6 ft 0 in)	32 – 25 August 1994
SG	4	(Comoros)	Ibrahim, Maoulida Said	1.80 m (5 ft 11 in)	31 – 2 April 1995
PG	5	(Comoros)	Salim, Ansal	1.75 m (5 ft 9 in)	21 – 21 October 2005
SG	6	(Comoros)	Chamime, Abdourohamane	1.84 m (6 ft 0 in)	31 – 17 February 1995
SG	7	(Madagascar)	Maurice, Soloanjary	1.97 m (6 ft 6 in)	25 – 3 June 2001
PG	8	(Comoros)	Abduyllatuf, Mouslim	1.75 m (5 ft 9 in)	32 – 2 September 1994
SG	9	(Comoros)	Binouri, Mahamadou	1.75 m (5 ft 9 in)	19 – 15 December 2006
SG	10	(Comoros)	Bendafi, Kamardine	1.84 m (6 ft 0 in)	33 – 1 March 1993
SG	11	(Comoros)	Moudhuhirou, Saindou Houmadi	1.75 m (5 ft 9 in)	29 – 9 March 1997
SG	12	(Comoros)	Said Ridhoine, Abacar	1.75 m (5 ft 9 in)	26 – 4 March 2000
PG	13	(Comoros)	Omar, Abdou-el-Anziz	1.80 m (5 ft 11 in)	27 – 5 June 1999
C	15	(Comoros)	Sallah, Said Omar	1.84 m (6 ft 0 in)	32 – 17 December 1993

Head coach

- (Comoros) Ali Sidi Abdoulwahab

Assistant coach(es)

- (Comoros) Yacine Mohamed

Legend

- (C) Team captain
- Injured

- Roster
Updated: 8 October 2023
