= JCA Kings =

- League: Ligue d'Or
- Founded: 2010
- History: Jeunesse Club d'Abidjan; 2010–2025; JCA Kings; 2025–present
- Location: Abidjan, Ivory Coast
- Team colours: Navy and Old Gold
- President: Ismaël Cissé
- Team manager: Carlo Viera
- Head coach: Stéphane Konaté
- Championships: 2 Ligue d'Or; 3 Ivorian Cups; 2 Ivorian Super Cups; 1 District Cup

JCA Kings, formerly known as Jeunesse Club d'Abidjan (in English: Abidjan Youth Club), is an Ivorian basketball team based in Abidjan. They play in the Ligue d'Or and in the Basketball Africa League (BAL) following their qualification in 2026.

JCA has won two national championship, in 2025 and 2026, three Ivorian Cups, two Ivorian Super Cups. It made its BAL debut in the 2026 season.

== History ==
The team was founded in 2010 by Carlo Viera and Moussa Diarra, with the aim of developing local basketball, as well as to challenge the national dominance of ABC Fighters, who had won the national championship twenty times. In the first years of the team, JCA reached the finals of the Ligue d'Or, but lost three times in a row between 2010 and 2012.

After some years in relative obscurity, they had a breakthrough season in the 2022–23 season, when they reached the finals once again, but lost to ABC, 0–2. In 2023, JCA won its first trophy when they won the Ivorian Cup.

Ahead of the 2024–25 season, the club signed Stéphane Konaté as its new head coach. The team went on to win their first league title, after defeating SOA in the finals.

As the winners of the national league, JCA qualified for the Road to BAL in 2025, and made its international debut on 18 October with a win against Ghanaian team Spintex Knights. The Kings qualified for the 2026 BAL season on 15 November, after they defeated the Spintex Knights again, and thus became the second Ivorian team to qualify for the Basketball Africa League (BAL).

The team was later acquired by Ismaël Adam Cissé who professionalized the organization. It eventually also led to the rebranding of the team as JCA Kings.

== Honours ==
Ligue d'Or

- Champions (2): 2024–25, 2025-2026
  - Runners-up (4): 2010, 2011, 2012, 2023

Ivorian Basketball Cup

- Winners (3): 2023, 2025, 2026 (National Cup)

Ivorian Super Cup

- Winners (2): 2024, 2026

District Cup

- Winners (1): 2015
