= Ligue d'Or =

- Organising body: Ivorian Basketball Federation
- Country: Ivory Coast
- Number of teams: 12
- Level on pyramid: 1
- International cup: Basketball Africa League (BAL)
- Current champions: JCA (2nd title) (2026)
- Most championships: ABC Fighters (22 titles)
- Website: Link
- 2026 Ligue d'Or season

The Ligue d'Or (in English: Golden League), formerly known as the Ivorian Basketball Championship, is the premier basketball league for clubs in Ivory Coast. The league consist out of twelve teams as of the 2024 season. The most successful team in the league's history is ABC Fighters, who have won a record 22 titles. The league was re-named the "Ligue d'Or" in 2024.

The champions of the national championship are eligible to play in the Road to BAL, the qualifying rounds of the Basketball Africa League (BAL).

== Current teams ==
The following twelve teams played in the Ligue d'Or during the 2026–27 season:

Club	Location
ABC Fighters	Abidjan
ABI Snipers	Abidjan
ASA	Abidjan
Azur	Abidjan
CBA	Abidjan
CSA Treichville	Abidjan
Global	Abidjan
Hypersonics	Abidjan
JCA	Abidjan
A.S. I.N.J.S.	Abidjan
SOA	Yamoussoukro
Warriors	Abidjan

== Champions ==
Season	Champions	Runners-up	Finals score	Ref.
2017–18	ABC (17)	SOA	2–0	
2018–19	ABC (18)	Azur	2–1	
2019–20 (Note: The 2020 season was suspended in September 2020 due to the COVID-19 pandemic but returned with the Tournoi Federal (Federal Tournament) in October to determine the national champion.)	ABC (19)	CSA Treichville	78–60	
2020–21	SOA (1)	ABC Fighters	2–0	
2021–22	ABC Fighters (20)	Azur	2–0	
2022–23	ABC Fighters (21)	JCA	2–0	
2024	ABC Fighters (22)	SOA	3–1	
2025	JCA	SOA	2–0	
2026	JCA (2)	ABC Fighters	2–1	

=== Performance by club ===
Club	Winners	Runners-up	Years won	Years runner-up
ABC Fighters	22	2	2004, 2005, 2006, 2007, 2008, 2009, 2010, 2011, 2012, 2013, 2014, 2015, 2016, 2017, 2019, 2020, 2022, 2023, 2024	2021, 2026
SOA	1	4	2021	2014, 2018, 2024, 2025
JCA	2	4	2025, 2026	2010, 2011, 2012, 2023
Azur	0	2	–	2019, 2022
CSA Treichville	0	1	–	2020

== Individual awards ==
- Final MVP
  - 2021: Asshe Kokoun (SOA)
  - 2023: L. J. Westbrook (ABC Fighters)
  - 2026: Jonathan Cissé (JCA)
- Regular Season MVP:
  - 2020: Stéphane Konaté (ABC Fighters)
  - 2021: Lionel Kouadio (Azur)
  - 2023: L.J westbrook (ABC Fighters)
  - 2025: Ulrich Kra (JCA)
  - 2026: Moussa Koné (ABC Fighters)
- Coach of the Season:
  - 2025: Stéphane Konaté (JCA)

== Cup ==
List of Ivorian Cup winners
Year	Winners	Runners-up	Score	Ref.
2025	JCA	SOA	64–55	
2026	JCA	ASA	66–59	

== Super Cup ==
List of Ivorian Super Cup winners
Year	Winners	Runners-up	Score	MVP	Ref.
2024	JCA	ABC Fighters	66–60	Ulrich Kra	
2025	SOA	ABC Fighters	62–58		
2026	JCA	SOA	58–50		
