= Mohamed Harat =

Algerian basketball player

No. 7 – NB Staouéli
- Position: Small forward
- League: Algerian Basketball Championship

Personal information
- Born: 9 June 1990 (age 36) Annaba, Algeria
- Listed height: 1.98 m (6 ft 6 in)

Career information
- NBA draft: 2012: undrafted
- Playing career: 2009–present

Career history
- 2009–2012: GS Pétroliers
- 2013–2015: FUS Rabat
- 2015–2017: GS Pétroliers
- 2016–2019: Al-Shamal SC
- 2019–2020: Al-Arabi
- 2020: Manama Club
- 2020–2021: Al-Fateh
- 2021: GS Pétroliers
- 2021–2022: Al-Shamal
- 2022–2023: Al-Ittihad Aleppo
- 2023–2024: Al-Nasr Dubai
- 2025–2026: Sagesse Club
- 2026–present: NB Staouéli

Career highlights
- Qatari League champion (2019); Qatari League MVP (2020); Saudi League MVP (2021) (2022); Syrian League Champion (2022); Syrian League Finals MVP (2022); UAE League Finals (2024); Libyan League Champion (2025); FIBA Africa League All-Star Five (2017); FIBA Africa League Scoring Champion (2019); Arab Championship MVP (2015)

Mohamed Harat (born 9 June 1990) is an Algerian basketball player for NB Staouéli of the Algerian Basketball Championship. He also represents the Algerian national team.

== Professional career ==
In 2013, Harat signed with FUS Rabat in Morocco. In 2015, he returned to GS Pétroliers and he played in the Arab Club Competition and was named MVP. He returned a year later to play for GS Pétroliers again. With GSP, Harat played at the 2017 FIBA Africa Clubs Champions Cup where he led the competition in scoring (24.8 points per game) and was named to the All-Star Five.

Harat was on the roster of Qatari club Al-Shamal SC from 2016. He won the Qatari League championship in 2019, adding a game-high 25 points for his team in the final.

In 2019, Harat played with Al-Arabi SC in Qatar. He was named the Qatari League MVP of the 2019–20 season. Then, Harat played in Bahrain with Manama Club. In the 2020–21 season with Al Fateh in Saudi Arabia, he averaged 29.1 points, 17.1 rebounds and 4.4 assists.

In May 2021, he returned to GS Pétroliers to join the team ahead of the 2021 BAL season. He played in only one game at the BAL, recording 28 points and 9 rebounds, as he had to sit out the remainder of the season due to a muscle sprain.

He joined Al-Nasr Dubai in October 2023.

== National team career ==
Harat has been a member of the Algeria national basketball team since 2011. He played at AfroBasket 2015 with his country.

== BAL career statistics ==
Legend
GP	Games played	GS	Games started	MPG	Minutes per game
FG%	Field goal percentage	3P%	3-point field goal percentage	FT%	Free throw percentage
RPG	Rebounds per game	APG	Assists per game	SPG	Steals per game
BPG	Blocks per game	PPG	Points per game	**Bold**	Career high

Year	Team	GP	GS	MPG	FG%	3P%	FT%	RPG	APG	SPG	BPG	PPG
2021	GS Pétroliers	1	0	28.5	.500	.000	.667	9.0	2.0	3.0	.0	28.0
Career		1	0	28.5	.500	.000	.667	9.0	2.0	3.0	.0	28.0
