= Comoros Basketball Championship =

Highest level basketball league in the Comoros

- Organising body: Comorian Basketball Federation
- Country: Comoros
- Current champions: Ushindzi (2nd title) (2023)
- Most championships: Amisco (9 titles)

The Comoros National Basketball Championship is an annual tournament for basketball teams in the Comoros to determine the national champions. It is organised by the Comorian Basketball Federation (in French: Fédération Comorienne de Basketball; abbreviated as FCB).

The current champions in the men's category are Ushindzi Club. The winners of each season are eligible to represent the Comoros in the Road to BAL.

== Men’s tournament ==
=== Champions ===
- 2015: Ushindzi
- 2016: Usoni
- 2017: Usoni
- 2020: Amisco
- 2022: Djabal Iconi
- 2023: Ushindzi

=== Finals ===
Season	Champions	Runners-up	Finals score
2016	Usoni	Ushindzi	
2017	Usoni	Vulcan Club de Moroni	66–52
2020	Amisco (9)	Ushindzi	61–57 (OT)
2022	Djabal		
2023	Ushindzi	Djabal Basket Iconi	67–54

== Women’s tournament ==
=== Champions ===
- 2016: Watukufu
- 2017: UCM
- 2020: Basket Club de Mitsoudje
- 2023: AS Faigaffe

=== Finals ===
Season	Champions	Runners-up	Finals score
2016	Watukufu	AS Faigaffe	
2017	UCM	Pouzzolanes	64–63
2020	Basket Club de Mitsoudje	Faigast Sport	60–59
2023	AS Faigaffe	ODM	52–40
