= Abidjan Azur =

- League: Ivorian Basketball Championship
- Location: Abidjan, Ivory Coast
- President: Éric Poby
- Head coach: Lazare Bouabré

Abidjan Azur Basketball, also known simply as Azur, is an Ivorian basketball club based in Abidjan. The team competes in the Ivorian Basketball Championship.

== Honours ==
Ivorian Championship

- Runners-up (1): 2019

Ivorian Cup

- Winners (1): 2018

Ivorian Supercup

- Runners-up (1): 2019
