= Espoir Basket Club =

- League: Ligue de Basket-ball de l’Estuaire; Gabonese Cup
- Location: Libreville, Gabon
- President: David Chancel Likouma
- Head coach: Michaël Hermann Oganda Igoue

Espoir Basket Club (in English: Hope Basketball Club), also known as Espoir BC, is a Gabonese semi-professional basketball team based in Libreville. The team has won the Gabonese Cup in 2023.

They play in the Estuaire Province's Ligue de Basket-ball de l’Estuaire (Libabe), and won the province championship in 2022 after defeating former champions Clutch Time in the final, 73–37.

As runners-up of the 2022 Gabonese Cup and replacement of champions Clutch Time, Espoir earned the right to play in the 2023 BAL qualification. In September 2022, Espoir recruited Stéphane Lasme, widely considered the best Gabonese player ever, as a reinforcement. Michaël Oganda Igoue is the team's current head coach.

== Honours ==
Ligue de Basket-ball de l’Estuaire

- Champions (1): 2022

Gabonese Cup

- Winners (1): 2023
- Runners-up (1): 2022

== In international competitions ==
BAL Qualifiers

- 2023 – In progress

== Players ==
=== 2022 roster ===
The following is the Espoir roster for the 2023 BAL qualification:

Note: Flags indicate national team eligibility at FIBA-sanctioned events. Players may hold other non-FIBA nationalities not displayed.

Espoir Basket Club roster
Players
Coaches

Pos.	No.	Nat.	Name
	1	(Gabon)	Sow, Ali
	5	(Gabon)	Moundounga-Moumbeki, Warene (C)
	7	(Gabon)	Loussi, Junior
	15	(Gabon)	Moupomo, Dolivitch
	30	(Gabon)	Boukosso Igouwe, Hermann Junior
	33	(Gabon)	Kanga Lendouga, Emmanuel
	34	(Gabon)	Kounda Kounda, Mike Daniel
	77	(Gabon)	Meyet Aworet, Jarode
	99	(Gabon)	Minko, Tracey

Head coach

- (Gabon) Michaël Hermann Oganda Igoue

Assistant coach(es)

- (Gabon) Bibeyi Ruth Glenna

Legend

- (C) Team captain
- Injured

- Roster
Updated: 13 October 2022
