= ABC Fighters =

- Nickname: Les Dangôrôs
- Leagues: Ivorian Basketball Championship; Basketball Africa League
- Founded: 1997
- History: Abidjan Basket Club; 1997–2021; ABC Fighters; 2021–present
- Arena: Palais des Sports de Treichville
- Capacity: 3,500
- Location: Abidjan, Ivory Coast
- Team colors: Red, White, Orange
- President: Boubakari Touré
- Head coach: Milutin Nikolić
- Championships: 1 FIBA Africa Cup; 22 Ivorian Leagues; 12 Ivorian Cups; 2 Ivorian SuperCups
| Home | Away |

Abidjan Basket Club Fighters, commonly known as ABC Fighters, is an Ivorian professional basketball club based in the city of Abidjan. Founded in 1997, the team is the most successful men teams in the country, with a record 22 national championships, and one continental FIBA Africa Champions Cup in 2005. The home arena of the team is the Palais des Sports de Treichville.

== History ==
The ABC club was established in 1997 by members of the basketball section of the Africa Sports d'Abidjan football club. In 2002, the team played in the FIBA Africa Club Champions Cup for the first time. In 2004, the first-ever Ivorian Basketball Championship was won.

In 2005, ABC won the FIBA Africa Clubs Champions Cup and was crowned African champions for the first time. In the final, ABC beat Angolan club Interclube 67–66. Stéphane Konaté was named the competition's Most Valuable Player.

In 2021, the team was re-named from ABC to ABC Fighters. The team is nicknamed Dangôrôs, a term that designates in Malinké those who have earned the respect devolved to the elders.

On 18 November 2022, ABC defeated Stade Malien in the Road to BAL semi-finals and clinched their first-ever ticket to the Basketball Africa League (BAL).

In the playoffs of the 2023 BAL season, ABC played against Petro de Luanda in the quarter-finals. They lost 88-84.

In September 2024, the Fighters signed Karim Mané, the first former NBA player to sign with the team.

== Honours ==
=== Domestic ===
Ivorian Basketball Championship

- Champions (22): 2004, 2005, 2006, 2007, 2008, 2009, 2010, 2011, 2012, 2013, 2014, 2015, 2016, 2017, 2019, 2020, 2022, 2023, 2024

Ivorian Cup

- Champions (12): 2004, 2005, 2006, 2008, 2010, 2012, 2013, 2014, 2015, 2016, 2018, 2019

Ivorian SuperCup

- Champions (2): 2005, 2006

=== International ===
FIBA Africa Clubs Champions Cup

- Winners (1): 2005

== In African competitions ==
FIBA Africa Clubs Champions Cup (7 appearances)

2002 – 5th Place
2004 – Runners-up (silver)
2005 – Champions (gold)

2006 – 6th Place
2007 – 3rd Place (bronze)

2012 – 8th Place
2014 – 11th Place

BAL Qualifiers (1 appearance)

2020 – Second Round

=== BAL season by season ===
| Season | League | Conference | Regular season | | | | Postseason | Head coach | Captain |
| Season | League | Conference | Finish | Wins | Losses | Win % | Postseason | Head coach | Captain |
|---|---|---|---|---|---|---|---|---|---|
ABC Fighters
| 2023 | BAL | Sahara | 4th | 3 | 2 | .600 | Lost quarterfinals (Petro de Luanda, 84–88) | Liz Mills | Stéphane Konaté |
| Season record | | | | 3 | 2 | .600 | | | |
| Playoffs record | | | | 0 | 1 | .000 | | | |

== Players ==
The ABC logo used until 2021

=== Current roster ===
As of 26 February 2023.

Note: Flags indicate national team, as has been defined under FIBA eligibility rules. Players may hold more than one non-FIBA nationality.

| No. | Pos. | Nat. | Player |
|---|---|---|---|
| 1 | F | (Ivory Coast) CIV | Mike Fofana |
| 5 | SF | (Ivory Coast) CIV | Loukou Oka |
| 8 | F | (Ivory Coast) CIV | Ismael Diarra |
| 10 | PG | (Ivory Coast) CIV | Faman Abdallah Kone |
| 11 | G | (Ivory Coast) CIV | Aristide Otto |
| 12 | F | (Ivory Coast) CIV | Moussa Kone |
| 15 | SG | (Ivory Coast) CIV | Stéphane Konaté (captain) |
| | F | (South Sudan) SSD | Chudier Bile |
| | PG | (United States) USA | Alex Robinson |
| | C | (Nigeria) NGR | Chris Obekpa |
| | SG | (Niger) NIG | Abdoulaye Harouna |

Head coach: (Australia) Liz Mills

For the 2023 BAL Playoffs the team signed Kenyan forward Tylor Ongwae, Tunisian PG Omar Abada and Guinean centre Ousmane Drame.

=== Notable players ===
Note: Flags indicate national team eligibility at FIBA-sanctioned events. Players may hold other non-FIBA nationalities not displayed.

Criteria

To appear in this section a player must have either:

- Set a club record or won an individual award while at the club
- Played at least one official international match for their national team at any time
- Played at least one official NBA match at any time.

- (Ivory Coast) Stéphane Konaté
- (Ivory Coast) Abraham Sie

== Head coaches ==
- (Ivory Coast) Franck Sylva: (-2023)
- (Australia) Liz Mills: (2023)
- (Serbia) Milutin Nikolić: (2023–present)
