= 2020–21 GNBC season =

The 2020–21 GNBC season was the first season of Malagasy club GNBC. They qualified for the inaugural Basketball Africa League (BAL) season through the Road to BAL qualification rounds, in which they finished as the second-ranked team in the East Division.

In the inaugural BAL season, that was completely hosted in Kigali due to the COVID-19 pandemic, they were allocated in Group A. After losing all three games, including a 47-point loss to US Monastir, they were eliminated in the group phase.

== Roster ==
GNBC roster
Players
Coaches

Pos.	No.	Nat.	Name	Ht.	Age
C	00	(Madagascar)	Solondrainy, Alpha	1.98 m (6 ft 6 in)	29 – 4 May 1995
SG	1	(Madagascar)	Randriamampionona, Elly	1.88 m (6 ft 2 in)	27 – 20 July 1997
PG	2	(Madagascar)	Sen Chan, Zico	1.80 m (5 ft 11 in)	26 – 30 January 1999
PG	5	(Madagascar)	Razanamahenina, Kiady	1.84 m (6 ft 0 in)	28 – 15 December 1996
SG	7	(Madagascar)	Ramorasata, Ndranto	1.74 m (5 ft 9 in)	35 – 27 May 1989
PG	8	(Madagascar)	Ralison, Andriantsara	1.74 m (5 ft 9 in)	34 – 11 August 1990
F	11	(Madagascar)	Mory, Francis (C)	1.93 m (6 ft 4 in)	33 – 4 April 1991
C	12	(Madagascar)	Chanel, Chancy	1.93 m (6 ft 4 in)	39 – 25 January 1986
C	15	(Madagascar)	Rasolomanana, Anthony	1.98 m (6 ft 6 in)	27 – 2 May 1997
C	21	(Madagascar)	Loubacky, Rick-Ley	1.98 m (6 ft 6 in)	28 – 27 December 1996
G	23	(Madagascar)	Mandimbison, Constant	1.95 m (6 ft 5 in)	34 – 22 August 1990
C	55	(United States)	Ridley, Cameron (I)	2.06 m (6 ft 9 in)	31 – 27 October 1993

Head coach

- (Madagascar) Lova Navalona Raharidera

Assistant coach(es)

- (Madagascar) Daniel Rabearimanana

Legend

- (C) Team captain
- (I) Import player
- Injured

- Roster
Updated: 16 May 2020

== Games ==
=== Road to BAL ===
==== First round ====
30 October 2019 1	GNBC (Madagascar)	124–53	(Comoros) Usoni	Antananarivo
22:30	Scoring by quarter: 27-6, 21-26, 38-11, 38-10
	Pts: Razafimanantsoa 17; Rebs: De Claisse 13; Asts: Mandimbison 6	Boxscore	Pts: Said 16; Rebs: Said 6 Asts: Abdallah 4	Arena: Palais des Sports et la Culture

31 October 2019 2	KPA (Kenya)	98–84	(Madagascar) GNBC	Antananarivo
22:30	Scoring by quarter: 26-23, 25-20, 23-19, 24-22
	Pts: Ayodi 20; Rebs: Nyakinda 12; Asts: Odendo, Kazunguzibwa 5	Boxscore	Pts: Mory 36; Rebs: Rakotonirina, Randriamampionona 8 Asts: Mandimbison 5	Arena: Palais des Sports et la Culture

2 November 2019 3	GNBC (Madagascar)	92–67	(Seychelles) Beau Vallon Heat	Antananarivo
22:30	Scoring by quarter: 22-19, 21-9, 30-14, 19-25
	Pts: Mandimbison 30; Rebs: De Claisse 10; Asts: Razafimanantsoa 6	Boxscore	Pts: Bouchereau 14; Rebs: N'Ganga 9 Asts: Bouchereau 3	Arena: Palais des Sports et la Culture

3 November 2019 4	Cobra (South Sudan)	63–86	(Madagascar) GNBC	Antananarivo
22:30	Scoring by quarter: 16-20, 15-25, 9-22, 23-19
	Pts: Lado, Rumudu 11; Rebs: Magol 11; Asts: Morris 3	Boxscore	Pts: Randriamampionona 22; Rebs: Rakotonirina 9 Asts: Randriamampionona 4	Arena: Palais des Sports et la Culture

==== Second round ====
===== Semi-final =====
21 December 2019	Ferroviário de Maputo (Mozambique)	90–94	(Madagascar) GNBC	Kigali
20:30	Scoring by quarter: 28–17, 29–14, 19–29, 14–24
	Pts: Calvo Masa 33; Rebs: Muchate 10; Asts: Muchate & Novela 5 PIR: Calvo Masa 28	Boxscore	Pts: Randriamampionona & Mandimbison 22; Rebs: Mandimbison 10; Asts: Ralison 6 PIR: Mandimbison 33	Arena: Kigali Arena

===== Final =====
22 December 2019	Patriots (Rwanda)	94–63	(Madagascar) GNBC	Kigali
	Scoring by quarter: 16–15, 28–14, 21–18, 29–16
	Pts: Mukama 18; Rebs: Ndizeye 11; Asts: Gasana 6	Boxscore	Pts: Randriamampionona 14; Rebs: Mandimbison 6 Asts: Mandimbison 5	Arena: Kigali Arena

=== BAL ===
==== Group phase ====
17 May 2021 1	GNBC (Madagascar)	66–113	(Tunisia) US Monastir	Kigali
19:00 GMT	Scoring by quarter: 13–23, 19–25, 11–30, 23–25
	Pts: Randriamampionona 26; Rebs: Mandimbison 4 Asts: Razanamahenina 7	Boxscore	Pts: Ben Romdhane 23; Rebs: Ben Romdhane 10; Asts: Crawford 8	Arena: Kigali Arena; Attendance: 498

19 May 2021 2	Patriots (Rwanda)	78–72	(Madagascar) GNBC	Kigali
12:00 GMT	Scoring by quarter: 19-25, 23-19, 14-16, 22-12
	Pts: Costner 16; Rebs: Wamukota 11; Asts: Gasana 4	Boxscore	Pts: Razanamahenina 21; Rebs: Mory 9 Asts: Razanamahenina 6	Arena: Kigali Arena; Attendance: 1,022

23 May 2021 3	GNBC (Madagascar)	69–80	(Nigeria) Rivers Hoopers	Kigali
12:00 GMT	Scoring by quarter: 18-18, 22-23, 19-18, 10-21
	Pts: Mandimbison 19; Rebs: Mandimbison 6 Asts: Razanamahenina 5		Pts: Sullivan 19; Rebs: Koko 12; Asts: Uzoh, Daniels, Balogun 3	Arena: Kigali Arena
