= Madagascar men's national basketball team =

Madagascar
- FIBA ranking: 90 (1 September 2026)
- Joined FIBA: 1963
- FIBA zone: FIBA Africa
- National federation: Fédération Malagasy de Basket-Ball
- Coach: Mickael Pivaud

AfroBasket
- Appearances: 4
Home	Away

Former logo of the Fédération Malagasy de Basket-Ball

The Madagascar national basketball team is the national basketball team representing Madagascar. It is administered by the Fédération Malagasy de Basket-Ball (Madagascar Basketball Federation).

Its biggest success has been the 9th place at the FIBA Africa Championship 1972 where Madagascar surprisingly finished ahead of team Côte d'Ivoire and team Nigeria.

Madagascar was chosen as host of the FIBA Africa Championship 2011. The country received the bid from Côte d'Ivoire where the event could not take place because of instabilities after the civil war. Madagascar's automatic qualification is only the 3rd time in its history. Its last appearance at Africa's most prestigious basketball event was in 2003.

== Competitive record ==
=== AfroBasket ===
Year	Round	Position	GP	W	L
(United Arab Republic) 1962	Did not qualify				
(Morocco) 1964	Did not qualify				
(Tunisia) 1965	Did not qualify				
(Morocco) 1968	Did not qualify				
(Egypt) 1970	Did not qualify				
(Senegal) 1972	Ninth place	9th	6	2	4
(Central African Republic) 1974	Did not qualify				
(Egypt) 1975	Did not qualify				
(Senegal) 1978	Did not qualify				
(Morocco) 1980	Did not qualify				
(Somalia) 1981	Did not qualify				
(Egypt) 1983	Did not qualify				
(Ivory Coast) 1985	Did not qualify				
(Tunisia) 1987	Did not qualify				
(Angola) 1989	Did not qualify				
(Egypt) 1992	Did not qualify				
(Kenya) 1993	Did not qualify				
(Algeria) 1995	Did not qualify				
(Senegal) 1997	Did not qualify				
(Angola) 1999	Did not qualify				
(Morocco) 2001	Did not qualify				
(Egypt) 2003	Preliminary round	12th	6	0	6
(Algeria) 2005	Did not qualify				
(Angola) 2007	Did not qualify				
(Libya) 2009	Did not qualify				
(Madagascar) 2011	Round of 16	13th	5	1	4
(Ivory Coast) 2013	Did not qualify				
(Tunisia) 2015	Did not qualify				
(Tunisia) (Senegal) 2017	Did not qualify				
(Rwanda) 2021	Did not qualify				
(Angola) 2025	Preliminary round	14th	3	0	3
Total	4 appearances		20	3	17

=== African Games ===
- 1965-1978 : Did not qualify
- 1987 : ? (Qualified)
- 1991-2015 : Did not qualify

== Current roster ==
Roster for the AfroBasket 2025.

Madagascar men's national basketball team roster
Players
Coaches

Pos.	No.	Name	Age – Date of birth	Height	Club
F	1	Elly Randriamampionona	28 – 20 July 1997	1.88 m (6 ft 2 in)	COSPN	(Madagascar)
G	4	Mathias M'Madi	20 – 2 June 2005	1.94 m (6 ft 4 in)	CB Morón	(Spain)
G	6	Livio Ratianarivo	29 – 24 April 1996	1.86 m (6 ft 1 in)	COSPN	(Madagascar)
SG	7	Kiady Razanamahenina	28 – 15 December 1996	1.84 m (6 ft 0 in)	Jura Basket	(Switzerland)
PF	10	Hasina Rasolonandrianina	22 – 17 October 2002	1.97 m (6 ft 6 in)	FANDRASA	(Madagascar)
C	11	Lovasoa Andriatsarafara	21 – 17 January 2004	2.07 m (6 ft 9 in)	Urbaine Tamatave	(Madagascar)
C	12	Alpha Solondrainy	26 – 4 May 1999	1.98 m (6 ft 6 in)	COSPN]	(France)
C	15	Anthony Rasolomanana	28 – 2 May 1997	1.98 m (6 ft 6 in)	COSPN	(Madagascar)
G	21	Austin Rasolonjatovo	23 – 21 December 2001	1.86 m (6 ft 1 in)	Saint-Vallier Basket Drôme	(Madagascar)
PF	22	Sitraka Raharimanantoanina	24 – 20 January 2001	2.07 m (6 ft 9 in)	Cholet Basket	(France)
PG	53	Rija Lahontan (C)	33 – 30 June 1992	1.70 m (5 ft 7 in)	Ail Rousset Basket	(France)
C	91	Fiary Rakotonirina	27 – 5 September 1997	1.97 m (6 ft 6 in)	GNBC	(Madagascar)

Head coach

- (Canada) John Douaglin

Assistant coach(es)

- (Canada) Nicolas Bertault
- (Madagascar) Tiarainiaina Rakotonanahary

Legend

- (C) Team captain
- Club – describes last
  club before the tournament
- Age – describes age
  on 12 August 2025

=== Past rosters ===
Roster for the 2011 FIBA Africa Championship. (last publicized squad)

Madagascar men's national basketball team roster
Players
Coaches

Pos.	No.	Name	Age – Date of birth	Height	Club
PG	4	René Rakotondrasolo	31 – 15 October 1979	1.80 m (5 ft 11 in)	Lorient Excellence	(France)
G/F	5	Rovanantenaina Andrianjafy	22 – 4 March 1989	1.73 m (5 ft 8 in)	A.S.C.U.T.	(Madagascar)
F/C	6	Charles Ramsdell	26 – 13 January 1985	2.08 m (6 ft 10 in)	Fontedoso Carrefour El Bulevar de Avila	(Spain)
G/F	7	Romule Razafimahasahy	23 – 22 April 1988	1.88 m (6 ft 2 in)	A.S.C.U.T.	(Madagascar)
PG	8	Andry Rakotoarisoa	30 – 2 August 1981	1.78 m (5 ft 10 in)	Anamalanga	(Madagascar)
F	9	Rijaniaina Andrianiombonana	26 – 22 July 1985	1.80 m (5 ft 11 in)	Fanatic	(Madagascar)
PG	10	Yerison Rabekoto	27 – 16 April 1984	1.80 m (5 ft 11 in)	Jeunesse Canon (Mayotte)	(France)
F	11	Toto Velondrisiky	19 – 4 May 1992	1.97 m (6 ft 6 in)	A.S.C.U.M.	(Madagascar)
C	12	Robert Kilobo	28 – 12 August 1983	2.00 m (6 ft 7 in)	SEBAM	(Madagascar)
F	13	Guillaume Milisen	26 – 6 May 1985	1.86 m (6 ft 1 in)	A.S.C.U.T.	(Madagascar)
C	14	Jaofeno Djianfary	32 – 12 August 1979	1.92 m (6 ft 4 in)	A.S.C.U.T.	(Madagascar)
C	15	Ahmed Zayad	21 – 25 January 1990	1.95 m (6 ft 5 in)	A.S.C.U.M.	(Madagascar)

Head coach

- (Spain) Angel Manzano

Legend

- Club – describes current
  or most recent club
- Age – describes age
  on 17 August 2011

At the AfroBasket 2011 in Antananarivo, Charles Ramsdell hit most field goals for Madagascar, whereas Romule Razafimahasahy hit most three pointers, and Yerison Rabekoto hit most free throws.

=== Head coach position ===
- (Spain) Angel Manzano: 2011
- (Madagascar) Juan Collazo: 2020-present

== See also ==
- Madagascar women's national basketball team
- Madagascar national under-19 basketball team
- Madagascar national under-17 basketball team
- Madagascar women's national under-17 basketball team
- Madagascar national 3x3 team
