= Basketball at the 2004 Summer Olympics – Men's qualification =

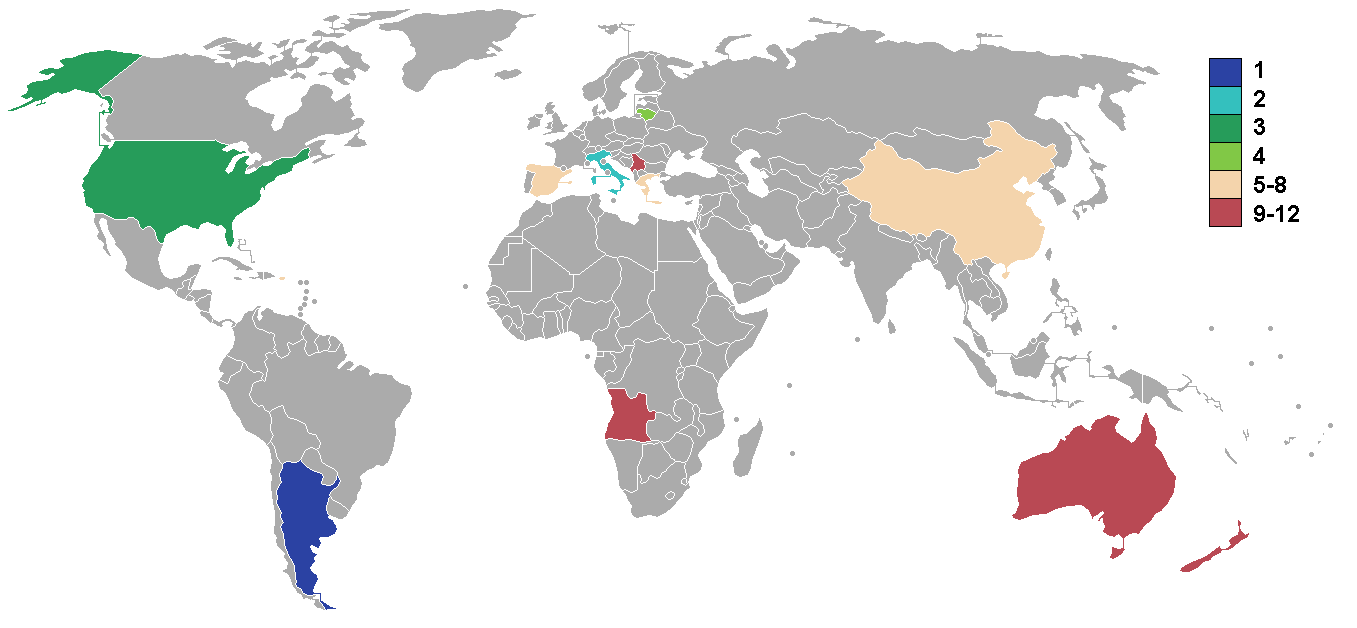
2004 men's teams.

The men's qualification for the 2004 Olympic men's basketball tournament occurred from 2002–2003; all five FIBA (International Basketball Federation) zones sent in teams.

The first qualifying tournament was the 2002 FIBA World Championship in which the champion was guaranteed of a place in the Olympics. Throughout the next two years, several regional tournaments served as qualification for the zonal tournaments, which doubles as intercontinental championships, to determine which teams were to participate in the 2004 Athens Summer Olympics.

== Qualification ==
A total of 12 teams took part in the Olympics, with each NOC sending in one team.

The host nation (Greece) qualified automatically as hosts.

Serbia and Montenegro qualified automatically by winning at the 2002 FIBA World Championship.

The other 10 teams were determined by five zonal tournaments (doubling as continental championships), held in 2003. Each zone was allocated with the following qualifying berths:

- FIBA Africa: 1 team (Champion)
- FIBA Americas: 3 teams (Champion, runner-up and third place)
- FIBA Asia: 1 team (Champion)
- FIBA Europe: 3 teams (Champion, runner-up and third place)
- FIBA Oceania: 2 teams (Champion and runner-up)

== Summary ==
| Qualified for the Olympics outright |
| Qualified automatically |

These are the final standings of the different Olympic qualifying tournaments. The venues are as follows:

- 2002 FIBA World Championship: Indianapolis (United States)
- FIBA Africa Championship 2003: Alexandria (Egypt)
- FIBA Americas Championship 2003: San Juan (Puerto Rico)
- FIBA Asia Championship 2003: Harbin (China)
- EuroBasket 2003: Borås, Luleå, Norrköping, Södertälje, Stockholm (Sweden)
- FIBA Oceania Championship 2003: Bendigo, Geelong, Melbourne (Australia)

| Rank | World | Africa | Americas | Asia | Europe | Oceania |
|---|---|---|---|---|---|---|
| 1st | Serbia and Montenegro | Angola | United States | China | Lithuania | Australia |
| 2nd | Argentina | Nigeria | Argentina | South Korea | Spain | New Zealand |
| 3rd | Germany | Egypt | Puerto Rico | Qatar | Italy | |
| 4th | New Zealand | Central African Republic | Canada | Lebanon | France | |
| 5th | Spain | Senegal | Venezuela | Iran | Greece | |
| 6th | United States | Tunisia | Mexico | Japan | Serbia and Montenegro | |
| 7th | Puerto Rico | South Africa | Brazil | Kazakhstan | Israel | |
| 8th | Brazil | Algeria | Dominican Republic | India | Russia | |
| 9th | Turkey | Morocco | Uruguay | Syria | Germany | |
| 10th | Russia | Ivory Coast | Virgin Islands | Jordan | Slovenia | |
| 11th | Angola | Mozambique | | Chinese Taipei | Croatia | |
| 12th | China | Madagascar | | Kuwait | Turkey | |
| 13th | Canada | | | Hong Kong | Latvia | |
| 14th | Venezuela | | | Uzbekistan | Ukraine | |
| 15th | Algeria | | | Philippines | Bosnia and Herzegovina | |
| 16th | Lebanon | | | Malaysia | Sweden | |

== FIBA Africa ==
The FIBA Africa Championship 2003 at Egypt determined FIBA Africa's only outright representative to the Olympics.

The tournament is structured into a preliminary round of 12 teams divided into 2 groups; the top two teams from each group advance to the knockout stages (semifinals and final).

Angola won the tournament, beating Nigeria in the final, 85–65.

== FIBA Americas ==
The FIBA Americas Championship 2003 held in the Roberto Clemente Coliseum at San Juan, Puerto Rico determined the three teams representing FIBA Americas in the Olympics.

The tournament is structured into a preliminary round of ten teams divided into 2 groups; the top four teams from each group advance to a quarterfinals Round-robin tournament, where results between groupmates carry over. The top four teams advance to the semifinals, a knockout stage deciding the first four places.

The United States defeated Argentina 106–73 in the final, and hosts Puerto Rico earned the final spot by defeating Canada 79–66 in the bronze medal match.

== FIBA Asia ==
The tournament held in Harbin, China is structured with a preliminary round of 16 teams divided into four groups, with the top two teams from each group advancing to the quarterfinals, where they'll be divided into two groups. The top two teams in the quarterfinals groups advance to the knockout semifinals and finals.

China defeated Korea 106–96 in the final, earning the only Asian berth for the Olympics.

== FIBA Europe ==
European berths for the Olympic Games were decided at EuroBasket 2003, held in Sweden.

The tournament is structured with a preliminary round of 16 teams divided into four groups, where the top team from each group advances to the quarterfinals directly. The second and third places play an extra math against the third and second places from another group. The four winners gain a spot in the quarterfinal round.

Lithuania defeated Spain 93-84 in the final, while Italy earned the third Europe spot in a 69–67 victory against France in the bronze medal match.

== FIBA Oceania ==
This time around, two spots were given to Oceania, so the only two competing nations had already qualified for the Olympic Tournament. Australia claimed the continental championship by defeating New Zealand in all three matches.
