= Elly Randriamampionona =

Malagasy basketball player

No. 1 – GNBC
- Position: Shooting guard
- League: N1A

Personal information
- Born: 20 July 1997 (age 29) Mahajanga, Madagascar
- Listed height: 1.88 m (6 ft 2 in)
- Listed weight: 78 kg (172 lb)

Career information
- Playing career: 2014–present

Career history
- 2014–2018: ASCB Boeny
- 2018–present: GNBC
- 2022: → COSPN

Career highlights
- 4× Malagasy N1A champion (2017, 2019, 2023, 2024); N1A Final MVP (2023); Malagasy President's Cup champion (2017)
Medals
Men's 3x3 basketball
Representing Madagascar
FIBA 3x3 Africa Cup
Gold medal – first place	2025 Antananarivo	Team
African Games
Gold medal – first place	2019 Rabat	3x3

Elly Randriamampionona (born 20 July 1997) is a Malagasy basketball player for GNBC and for Madagascar. Standing at 1.88 m (6 ft 2 in), he plays as shooting guard. Randriamampionona is a four-time champion of the N1A, the highest level league in Madagascar.

== Career ==
Randriamampionona started playing at a young age with Sporting Club Antsiranana before joining ASCB Boeny in 2014. In 2017, he won the Malagasy N1A and the President's Cup. In 2018, Randriamampionona signed with GNBC. He won the 2019 championship with the team and qualified for the BAL Qualifying Tournaments. There, he helped his team qualify for the first-ever Basketball Africa League (BAL) season.

In October 2022, he played on loan for COSPN in the 2023 BAL qualification.

On 30 October 2023, he won his third N1A title with GNBC, following a 89-71 win over ASCUT. Randriamampionona was named the Final MVP after his 43-point and 17-rebound performance.

== National team career ==
Randriamampionona plays for the Madagascar senior national team. He has been a member of the U15, U18 and U20 teams as well.

== 3x3 basketball ==
Randriamampionona has represented Madagascar in 3x3 basketball. On December 4, he won gold at the 2022 FIBA 3x3 Africa Cup and was named MVP as well after scoring a total of 34 points over the tournament.

== BAL career statistics ==
Legend
GP	Games played	GS	Games started	MPG	Minutes per game
FG%	Field goal percentage	3P%	3-point field goal percentage	FT%	Free throw percentage
RPG	Rebounds per game	APG	Assists per game	SPG	Steals per game
BPG	Blocks per game	PPG	Points per game	**Bold**	Career high

Year	Team	GP	GS	MPG	FG%	3P%	FT%	RPG	APG	SPG	BPG	PPG
2021	GNBC	3	3	30.9	.471	.476	.900	3.3	2.3	1.3	.0	17.0
Career		3	3	30.9	.471	.476	.900	3.3	2.3	1.3	.0	17.0

== Personal ==
Elly is the son of former basketball players Secren Antsiranana and Sirama Ambilobe.
