= Réveil de la Côte Ouest =

- Type: Weekly
- Founded: 1932
- Ceased publication: 1934
- Language: French language
- Headquarters: Majunga

Réveil de la Côte Ouest ('Awakening of the West Coast') was a French language weekly newspaper published from Majunga, Madagascar 1932–1934. Politically, Réveil de la Côte Ouest had a leftist and nationalist outlook.
