= Stade Rochelais Basket =

French basketball team

Stade Rochelais
- Nickname: Les Maritimes (The Maritimes)
- Leagues: Élite 2
- Founded: 1932
- History: Rupella (1932–1996); La Rochelle Basket 17 (1996–2000); Rupella Basket (2000–2012); Union Basket La Rochelle (2012–2015); Rupella Basket (2015–2018); Stade Rochelais Rupella (2018–2023); Stade Rochelais (2023–present)
- Arena: Salle Gaston-Neveur
- Capacity: 1,994
- Location: La Rochelle, France
- Team colors: Yellow, Black and Grey
- Head coach: Julien Cortey
- Championships: 1 French Second League
- Website: basket.staderochelais.com
Home	Away

Stade Rochelais basket is a French professional basketball team based in La Rochelle. Founded in 1932 as Rupella, the team was promoted to the LNB Pro B, the second division, for the first time in 1988. The Rochelais remained in the league for eight years, and had several former LNB Pro A players on its team throughout the years, including Don Collins and Freddy Hufnagel. The team currently plays in the Élite 2, having been relegated from the LNB Élite in the 2024–25 season.

In 1996, the club relegated back to the sixth level Nationale Masculine 4 (NM4). They returned to the third level Nationale Masculine 1 (NM1) in 2012, under coach Gregory Thiélin.

The club merged with the rugby union club Stade Rochelais in 2017, adopting the rugby club's traditional team colors of yellow and black. The basketball section became part of the omnisport club named Stade Rochelais Omnisports. In April 2020, former France national team player Aymeric Jeanneau became the director of the club and expressed the goal of bringing the team to the highest level Pro A. After a promotion to the Pro B in 2021 and a championship in 2024, they madr their debut in the LNB Élite (formerly the Pro A) in the 2024–25 season.

== Honours ==
- LNB Pro B
  - Champions (1): 2023–24

== Players ==
=== Current roster ===
Note: Flags indicate national team eligibility at FIBA-sanctioned events. Players may hold other non-FIBA nationalities not displayed.

Stade Rochelais basket roster
Players
Coaches

Pos.	No.	Nat.	Name
PG	1	(Germany)	Saibou, Joshiko	1.87 m (6 ft 2 in)	36 – 7 March 1990
G	3	(United States)	Townsend, Jase	1.90 m (6 ft 3 in)	26 – 15 July 2000
PF	5	(France)	Sanchez, Jerome	2.00 m (6 ft 7 in)	36 – 2 March 1990
G	10	(France)	Clerc, Gaëtan	1.89 m (6 ft 2 in)	35 – 13 January 1991
F	12	(France)	Digbeu, Tom	1.96 m (6 ft 5 in)	25 – 24 September 2001
C	13	(United Kingdom)	Belo, Jubrile	2.06 m (6 ft 9 in)	28 – 27 June 1998
PG	20	(France)	Leray, Mathéo	1.90 m (6 ft 3 in)	23 – 25 March 2003
G/F	24	(Spain)	Caicedo, Michael	1.99 m (6 ft 6 in)	23 – 21 June 2003
PF	33	(United States)	Hawkins, Ryan	2.01 m (6 ft 7 in)	29 – 12 May 1997
G/F	69	(France)	Hergott, Lucas	2.00 m (6 ft 7 in)	28 – 26 December 1997

Head coach

- (France) Julien Cortey

Assistant coach(es)

- (France) Josselyn Rallec
- (Germany) Dominik Günthner

Legend

- (C) Team captain
- Injured

- Roster
Updated: May 22, 2025

== Notable players ==
To appear in this section a player must have either:

- Set a club record or won an individual award as a professional player.
- Played at least one official international match for his senior national team at any time.

- (Madagascar) Kiady Razanamahenina
- (United States) Robert Turner
