= Niger men's national basketball team =

Niger
- FIBA ranking: NR (2 December 2025)
- Joined FIBA: 1963
- FIBA zone: FIBA Africa
- National federation: Fédération Nigérienne de Basket-Ball (FENIBASKET)
- Nickname: Giraffes

Olympic Games
- Appearances: None

FIBA World Cup
- Appearances: None

African Championship
- Appearances: 1 (1968)
- Medals: None
light	dark

The Niger national basketball team represents Niger in international competitions. It is administered by the Fédération Nigérienne de Basket-Ball (FENIBASKET).

Niger had its best performance at the 1968 African Basketball Championship, when Niger finished 8th after beating Côte d'Ivoire 73–62.

== Competitive record ==
=== Summer Olympics ===
yet to qualify

=== World championships ===
yet to qualify

=== FIBA Africa Championship ===
Year	Position	Tournament	Host
1968	8	FIBA Africa Championship 1968	Casablanca, Morocco

=== African Games ===
yet to qualify

== Notable players ==
Current notable players from Niger:

Niger roster
Players	Coaches
Pos. / No. / Name / Age – Date of birth / Height / Club / Ctr.; F/C / / Amadou Aboubakar Zaki / 29 – 10 February 1988 / 2.14 m (7 ft 0 in) / SO Maritime Boulogne / (France); Legend: Club – describes current club; Age – describes age on 15 May 2017

== See also ==
- Niger women's national basketball team
- Niger national under-19 basketball team
- Niger national under-17 basketball team
- Niger national 3x3 team
