= Yerison Rabekoto =

Malagasy basketball player

Personal information
- Born: 16 April 1984 (age 42) Antsiranana, Madagascar
- Listed height: 5 ft 11 in (1.80 m)
- Listed weight: 158.4 lb (72 kg)

Career information
- Playing career: 2007–2012
- Position: Point guard

Career history
- 2007–2011: SEBAM
- 2012: Jeunesse Canon

Yerison Rabekoto (born 16 April 1982) is a Malagasy retired basketball player. He played for SEBAM in Madagascar and Jeunesse Canon in France. Rabekoto was one of Madagascar's most prominent basketball figures.

He recorded second most minutes and most steals for the Madagascar national basketball team at the 2011 FIBA Africa Championship in Antananarivo.
