= Sudan men's national under-18 basketball team =

Youth basketball team representing Sudan

Sudan
- FIBA zone: FIBA Africa

World Championships
- Appearances: None

African Championships
- Appearances: None

The Sudan men's national under-18 basketball team is a national basketball team of Sudan, administered by the Sudan Basketball Association. It represents the country in international under-18 (under age 18) basketball competitions.

It appeared at the 2008 FIBA Africa Under-18 Championship qualification stage.

== See also ==
- Sudan men's national basketball team
