= Sudan men's national basketball team =

National Basketball Team of Sudan

Sudan
- FIBA ranking: NR (1 September 2026)
- Joined FIBA: 1953
- FIBA zone: FIBA Africa
- National federation: Sudan Basketball Federation

Olympic Games
- Appearances: None

FIBA World Cup
- Appearances: None

FIBA Africa Championship
- Appearances: 5
- Medals: Silver: 1962; Bronze: 1975
Home	Away

The Sudanese national basketball team is the national team of the country of Sudan. It is administered by the Sudan Basketball Association.

In the 1960s and 1970s, the country was among the continent's basketball elite as it finished runner-up at the FIBA Africa Championship in 1962 and won bronze in 1975.

The country has produced some NBA players, most notably Manute Bol and Luol Deng of the Minnesota Timberwolves. Deng, however, is not eligible for the national team, as he has been naturalized in the United Kingdom and plays for the UK in FIBA competitions and England in the Commonwealth Games. Traditionally, most of Sudan's most talented players have usually come from the South. (Bol and Deng e.g. were both born in South Sudan) Hence, the independence of South Sudan brought forth new challenges.

In recent years, several of the Sudan's top players have played key roles for teams of the US-based NCAA. Yet, these players normally do not play for the national team. Hence, the level of the national team has been very low. It finished winless at both the 2005 Islamic Solidarity Games and the 2011 Pan Arab Games.

== Competitive record ==
=== Summer Olympics ===
yet to qualify

=== World championships ===
yet to qualify

=== African Championship ===
Year	Position	Tournament	Host
1962	2nd place, silver medalist(s)	FIBA Africa Championship 1962	Cairo, United Arab Republic
1968	6	FIBA Africa Championship 1968	Casablanca, Morocco
1972	6	FIBA Africa Championship 1972	Dakar, Senegal
1975	3rd place, bronze medalist(s)	FIBA Africa Championship 1975	Alexandria, Egypt
1978	4	FIBA Africa Championship 1978	Dakar, Senegal

=== African Games ===
yet to qualify

== Current squad ==
At 2011 Pan Arab Games: (last publicized squad)

Sudan men's national basketball team roster
Players
Coaches

Pos.	No.	Name	Age – Date of birth	Height	Club
G	4	Orsd Hamend	–
G	5	Mortada Aze Elden	–
G	6	Haman Elkir	–
F/C	7	Mowafk Elmin	–
G	8	Alaa Eldin	–
F	9	Gamal Aly	–
F	10	Hassen Mostafa	–
F	11	Mazen Sabry	–
F/C	12	Elfadil Fouad	–
C	13	Ehab Heder	–
C	14	Ebrahim El Amman	–
F/C	15	Kamal Elfadel	–

Legend

- Club – describes current club
- Age – describes age
  on 06 December 2011

At the 2011 Pan Arab Games, Kamal Elfadel was Sudan's dominant player as he averaged 22 points and 11 rebounds per game.

== Notable players ==
Current notable players from South Sudan:

South Sudan men's national basketball team roster
Players
Coaches

Pos.	No.	Name	Age – Date of birth	Height	Club
F		Akoy Agau	22 – 28 November 1994	2.03 m (6 ft 8 in)	Georgetown Hoyas men's basketball	(United States)
C		Koch Bar	–	2.08 m (6 ft 10 in)	Bradley Braves men's basketball	(United States)
F/C		Thik Bol	20 – 6 January 1996	2.03 m (6 ft 8 in)	Southern Illinois Salukis men's basketball	(United States)
G		Peter Jok	22 – 30 March 1994	1.98 m (6 ft 6 in)	Iowa Hawkeyes men's basketball	(United States)
F		Wenyen Gabriel	19 – 26 March 1997	2.06 m (6 ft 9 in)	Kentucky Wildcats men's basketball	(United States)

Legend

- Club – describes current club
- Age – describes age

== See also ==
- Sudan national under-19 basketball team
