= FIBA Africa Championship 1972 =

FIBA AfroBasket 1972
6th FIBA Africa Basketball Championship

Tournament details
- Host country: Senegal
- Dates: 25 December 1971 – 2 January 1972
- Teams: 12
- Venue(s): 1 (in 1 host city)

Final positions
- Champions: Senegal (2nd title)

The FIBA Africa Championship 1972, was the sixth FIBA Africa Championship regional basketball championship held by FIBA Africa, which also served as Africa qualifier for the 1972 Summer Olympics, granting berths to the champion and runner-up. It was held in Senegal between 25 December 1971 and 2 January 1972. Twelve national teams entered the event under the auspices of FIBA Africa, the sport's regional governing body. The city of Dakar hosted the tournament. Senegal won their second title after defeating Egypt in the final.

== Format ==
- Teams were split into two round-robin groups of six teams each. The top two teams from each group advanced to the knockout semi-finals. The winners in the semi-finals competed for the championship and were granted berths to the 1968 Summer Olympics, while the losing teams from the semifinals competed for third place in an extra game.
- To define the remaining places in the final standings, teams that did not reach the semifinals played an extra game each against the team from the other group that finished in the same place in the preliminary stage. For example, third-placed teams from groups A and B played an extra game to define fifth and sixth places in the final standings.

== First round ==
Advanced to the semi-finals

=== Group A ===
Team	Pld	W	L	PF	PA	PD	Pts
Senegal	5	5	0	413	234	+179	10
Mali	5	4	1	400	319	+81	9
Tunisia	5	3	2	394	315	+79	8
Cameroon	5	2	3	365	339	+26	7
Madagascar	5	1	4	335	446	−111	6
Nigeria	5	0	5	250	504	−254	5

Cameroon	82–45	Madagascar
Scoring by half: 35–23, 47–22

Senegal	101–30	Nigeria
Scoring by half: 45–14, 56–16

Mali	65–54	Tunisia
Scoring by half: 31–23, 34–31

Mali	101–45	Nigeria
Scoring by half: 48–20, 53–25

Senegal	95–54	Madagascar
Scoring by half: 45–32, 50–22

Tunisia	84–59	Cameroon
Scoring by half: 30–34, 54–25

Mali	95–68	Madagascar
Scoring by half: 45–31, 50–37

Tunisia	96–52	Nigeria
Scoring by half: 44–24, 52–28

Senegal	65–47	Cameroon
Scoring by half: 37–16, 28–31

Cameroon	101–50	Nigeria
Scoring by half: 45–19, 56–31

Tunisia	101–63	Madagascar
Scoring by half: 48–25, 53–38

Senegal	76–44	Mali
Scoring by half: 37–24, 39–20

Madagascar	105–73	Nigeria
Scoring by half: 49–36, 56–37

Mali	95–76	Cameroon
Scoring by half: 50–37, 45–39

Senegal	76–59	Tunisia
Scoring by half: 28–21, 48–38

=== Group B ===
Team	Pld	W	L	PF	PA	PD	Pts
Egypt	5	5	0	413	348	+65	10
Central African Republic	5	4	1	439	403	+36	9
Sudan	5	3	2	381	353	+28	8
Morocco	5	2	3	404	378	+26	7
Ivory Coast	5	1	4	307	396	−89	6
Togo	5	0	5	315	381	−66	5

Sudan	92–61	Ivory Coast
Scoring by half: 42–28, 50–33

Morocco	89–66	Togo
Scoring by half: 39–30, 50–36

Egypt	96–88	Central African Republic
Scoring by half: 46–46, 50–42

Ivory Coast	62–58	Togo
Scoring by half: 30–23, 32–35

Central African Republic	97–82	Sudan
Scoring by half: 44–44, 53–38

Egypt	80–69	Morocco
Scoring by half: 33–24, 47–45

Egypt	72–63	Sudan
Scoring by half: 41–32, 31–31

Morocco	87–58	Ivory Coast
Scoring by half: 47–27, 40–31

Central African Republic	76–69 (OT)	Togo
Scoring by half: 32–29, 29–32 Overtime: 15–8

Egypt	89–70	Togo
Scoring by half: 54–38, 35–32

Sudan	79–71	Morocco
Scoring by half: 44–35, 35–36

Central African Republic	83–68	Ivory Coast
Scoring by half: 46–25, 37–43

== Knockout stage ==
=== Championship bracket ===
Semi-finals
January 1, 1972
Senegal	77
Central African Republic	66
January 1, 1972
Egypt	87
Mali	68

Final
January 2, 1972
Senegal	61
Egypt	54
Third place
January 2, 1972
Central African Republic	74
Mali	107

=== Semifinals ===
Egypt	87–68	Mali
Scoring by half: 42–38, 45–30

Senegal	77–66	Central African Republic
Scoring by half: 35–22, 42–44

=== Third place ===
Mali	107–74	Central African Republic
Scoring by half: 38–34, 69–40

=== Final ===
Senegal	61–54	Egypt
Scoring by half: 33–28, 28–26

== Classification stage ==
Fifth place

Tunisia	88–83	Sudan
Scoring by half: 40–35, 48–48

Seventh place

Morocco	62–61	Cameroon
Scoring by half: 33–35, 29–26

Ninth place

Madagascar	84–66	Ivory Coast
Scoring by half: 38–35, 46–31

Eleventh place

Togo	73–41	Nigeria
Scoring by half: 36–25, 37–16

== Final standings ==
Qualified for the 1972 Summer Olympics

Rank	Team	Record
1st place, gold medalist(s)	Senegal	7–0
2nd place, silver medalist(s)	Egypt	6–1
3rd place, bronze medalist(s)	Mali	5–2
4	Central African Republic	4–3
5	Tunisia	4–2
6	Sudan	3–3
7	Morocco	3–3
8	Cameroon	2–4
9	Madagascar	2–4
10	Ivory Coast	1–5
11	Togo	1–5
12	Nigeria	0–6
