= 2006 FIBA World Championship =

2006 edition of the FIBA World Championship

FIBA バスケットボール世界選手権 2006 FIBA Basukettobōru Sekai Senshuken 2006

Tournament details
- Host country: Japan
- Dates: 19 August – 3 September
- Officially opened by: Akihito
- Teams: 24 (from 5 confederations)
- Venues: 5 (in 5 host cities)

Final positions
- Champions: Spain (1st title)
- Runners-up: Greece
- Third place: United States
- Fourth place: Argentina

Tournament statistics
- Games played: 80
- MVP: (Spain) Pau Gasol
- Top scorer: (China) Yao Ming (25.3 points per game)

The 2006 FIBA World Championship was the 15th FIBA World Championship, the international basketball world championship for men's national teams. The tournament was hosted by Japan and held from 19 August to 3 September 2006. It was co-organised by the International Basketball Federation (FIBA), Japan Basketball Association (JABBA) and the 2006 Organising Committee.

For the first time since 1986, the World Championship was contested by 24 nations, eight more than in 2002. As a result, group rounds were held in four cities, with the knockout rounds held in Saitama City.

Spain won the tournament by defeating Greece 70–47 in the championship final. Spain won all nine games they played. Spain's gold medal in this tournament was the first medal Spain had ever won in a FIBA World Championship. Pau Gasol also became the first Spaniard to win the MVP award. It was the first time a country has won all nine of its games since 1994 when the United States won all nine games and took the gold medal home. The bronze medal was won by the United States, who defeated Argentina, 96–81, in the third place game, after a semi-finals loss to Greece. Up to 2019, including the 2014 tournament, it has been the only tournament where neither Yugoslavia (or one of its successor republics) or the United States have reached the final. The 2006 tournament marked the final appearance of Serbia and Montenegro as they broke up into the independent nations of Serbia and Montenegro after a successful independence referendum in Montenegro in May.

Seventeen years after the 2006 edition, Japan once again hosted the FIBA World Championships, now called the World Cup in 2023 in Okinawa along with the Philippines and Indonesia.

== Venues ==
Hamamatsu	2006 FIBA World Championship is located in Japan	Sapporo
Hamamatsu Arena; Capacity: 5,100	2006 FIBA World Championship is located in Japan	Sapporo Arena; Capacity: 6,400
Hiroshima	Saitama	Sendai
Hiroshima Green Arena; Capacity: 6,900	Saitama Super Arena; Capacity: 21,000	Sendai Gymnasium; Capacity: 6,100

== Qualification ==
There were 24 teams taking part in the 2006 World Cup of Basketball.

- Host nation: 1 berth
- 2004 Summer Olympics: 12 teams competing for 1 berth, removed from that country's FIBA zone
- FIBA Africa: 12 teams competing for 3 berths
- FIBA Oceania: 2 teams competing for 2 berths
- FIBA Americas: 10 teams competing for 4 berths
- FIBA Asia: 16 teams competing for 3 berths
- FIBA Europe: 16 teams competing for 6 berths
- Wild card: 4 berths

=== Qualified teams ===
Event	Date	Location	Berths	Qualified
Host nation			1	Japan
2004 Olympics	August 15–28, 2004	(Greece) Athens	1	Argentina
2005 FIBA Africa Championship	August 15–24, 2005	(Algeria) Algiers	3	Angola; Senegal; Nigeria
2005 FIBA Oceania Championship	August 17–21, 2005	(New Zealand) Auckland and Dunedin	2	Australia; New Zealand
2005 FIBA Americas Championship	August 24–September 4, 2005	(Dominican Republic) Santo Domingo	4	Brazil; Venezuela; United States; Panama
2005 FIBA Asia Championship	September 8–16, 2005	(Qatar) Doha	3	China; Lebanon; Qatar
EuroBasket 2005	4–22 September 2005	Serbia and Montenegro	6	Greece; Germany; France; Spain; Lithuania; Slovenia
Wild cards			4	Italy; Puerto Rico; Serbia and Montenegro; Turkey
TOTAL			24	

== Squads ==
At the start of tournament, all 24 participating countries had 12 players on their roster.

== Competing nations ==
The following national teams competed:

Group A	Group B	Group C	Group D
Argentina; France; Lebanon; Nigeria; Serbia and Montenegro; Venezuela	Angola; Germany; Japan; New Zealand; Panama; Spain	Australia; Brazil; Greece; Lithuania; Qatar; Turkey	China; Italy; Puerto Rico; Senegal; Slovenia; United States

Japan qualified as the host country, and Italy, Puerto Rico, Serbia and Montenegro, and Turkey gained FIBA wild-card invitations. Argentina qualified as the champion of the 2004 Olympics. The remaining 18 countries qualified through their continents' qualifying tournaments (six from Europe, four from the Americas, three from each of Asia and Africa and two from Oceania).

The draw for the 2006 World Championship was held in Tokyo on 15 January 2006. In the preliminary rounds, Group A played at Sendai, Group B at Hiroshima, Group C at Hamamatsu and Group D at Sapporo. The Medal Rounds were played at Saitama.

== Group stage ==
=== Group A ===
Venue: Sendai Gymnasium, Sendai

Pos	Team	Pld	W	L	PF	PA	PD	Pts	Qualification
1	Argentina	5	5	0	464	339	+125	10	Round of 16
2	France	5	3	2	353	329	+24	8	Round of 16
3	Nigeria	5	2	3	371	393	−22	7 (Note: Head-to-head record: Nigeria 2–0, Serbia and Montenegro 1–1, Lebanon 0–2)	Round of 16
4	Serbia and Montenegro	5	2	3	409	352	+57	7	Round of 16
5	Lebanon	5	2	3	357	451	−94	7	
6	Venezuela	5	1	4	336	426	−90	6	

Source: FIBA archive
Rules for classification: 1) points; 2) head-to-head points; 3) head-to-head goal average; 4) head-to-head number of points scored.

==== 19 August 2006 ====
Venezuela	72–82	Lebanon
Serbia and Montenegro	75–82	Nigeria
Argentina	80–70	France

==== 20 August 2006 ====
Nigeria	77–84	Venezuela
Lebanon	72–107	Argentina
France	65–61	Serbia and Montenegro

==== 21 August 2006 ====
Argentina	96–54	Venezuela
Serbia and Montenegro	104–57	Lebanon
France	64–53	Nigeria

==== 23 August 2006 ====
Nigeria	64–98	Argentina
Venezuela	65–90	Serbia and Montenegro
Lebanon	74–73	France

==== 24 August 2006 ====
Serbia and Montenegro	79–83	Argentina
Lebanon	72–95	Nigeria
France	81–61	Venezuela

=== Group B ===
Venue: Hiroshima Green Arena, Hiroshima

Pos	Team	Pld	W	L	PF	PA	PD	Pts	Qualification
1	Spain	5	5	0	476	336	+140	10	Round of 16
2	Germany	5	4	1	421	384	+37	9	Round of 16
3	Angola	5	3	2	451	406	+45	8	Round of 16
4	New Zealand	5	2	3	345	393	−48	7	Round of 16
5	Japan (H)	5	1	4	322	393	−71	6	
6	Panama	5	0	5	326	429	−103	5	

Source: FIBA archive
Rules for classification: 1) points; 2) head-to-head points; 3) head-to-head goal average; 4) head-to-head number of points scored.
(H) Hosts

==== 19 August 2006 ====
Germany	81–70	Japan
Angola	83–70	Panama
Spain	86–70	New Zealand

==== 20 August 2006 ====
Japan	62–87	Angola
New Zealand	56–80	Germany
Panama	57–101	Spain

==== 21 August 2006 ====
Angola	95–73	New Zealand
Germany	71–92	Spain
Japan	78–61	Panama

==== 23 August 2006 ====
Spain	93–83	Angola
Panama	63–81	Germany
New Zealand	60–57	Japan

==== 24 August 2006 ====
Angola	103–108 (3OT)	Germany
New Zealand	86–75	Panama
Japan	55–104	Spain

=== Group C ===
Venue: Hamamatsu Arena, Hamamatsu

Pos	Team	Pld	W	L	PF	PA	PD	Pts	Qualification
1	Greece	5	5	0	404	358	+46	10	Round of 16
2	Turkey	5	4	1	370	358	+12	9	Round of 16
3	Lithuania	5	3	2	413	353	+60	8	Round of 16
4	Australia	5	2	3	370	349	+21	7	Round of 16
5	Brazil	5	1	4	399	392	+7	6	
6	Qatar	5	0	5	310	456	−146	5	

Source: FIBA archive
Rules for classification: 1) points; 2) head-to-head points; 3) head-to-head goal average; 4) head-to-head number of points scored.

==== 19 August 2006 ====
Brazil	77–83	Australia
Greece	84–64	Qatar
Turkey	76–74	Lithuania

==== 20 August 2006 ====
Qatar	66–97	Brazil
Australia	68–76	Turkey
Lithuania	76–81(OT)	Greece

==== 22 August 2006 ====
Lithuania	106–65	Qatar
Greece	72–69	Australia
Turkey	73–71	Brazil

==== 23 August 2006 ====
Australia	57–78	Lithuania
Qatar	69–76	Turkey
Brazil	80–91	Greece

==== 24 August 2006 ====
Australia	93–46	Qatar
Lithuania	79–74	Brazil
Greece	76–69	Turkey

=== Group D ===
Venue: Sapporo Arena, Sapporo

Pos	Team	Pld	W	L	PF	PA	PD	Pts	Qualification
1	United States	5	5	0	543	428	+115	10	Round of 16
2	Italy	5	4	1	386	367	+19	9	Round of 16
3	Slovenia	5	2	3	434	433	+1	7 (Note: Head-to-head record: Slovenia 1–1 (1.04 GAvg), China 1–1 (0.99 GAvg), Puerto Rico 1–1 (0.97 GAvg))	Round of 16
4	China	5	2	3	424	455	−31	7	Round of 16
5	Puerto Rico	5	2	3	432	440	−8	7	
6	Senegal	5	0	5	355	451	−96	5	

Source: FIBA archive
Rules for classification: 1) points; 2) head-to-head points; 3) head-to-head goal average; 4) head-to-head number of points scored.

==== 19 August 2006 ====
Puerto Rico	100–111	United States
Slovenia	96–79	Senegal
China	69–84	Italy

==== 20 August 2006 ====
Senegal	79–88	Puerto Rico
Italy	80–76	Slovenia
United States	121–90	China

==== 22 August 2006 ====
Puerto Rico	90–87 (OT)	China
Italy	64–56	Senegal
Slovenia	95–114	United States

==== 23 August 2006 ====
Senegal	83–100	China
Puerto Rico	82–90	Slovenia
United States	94–85	Italy

==== 24 August 2006 ====
Slovenia	77–78	China
Italy	73–72	Puerto Rico
United States	103–58	Senegal

== Knockout stage ==
Venue: Saitama Super Arena, Saitama

Round of 16
26 August
Argentina	79
New Zealand	62
26 August
Turkey	90
Slovenia	84
26 August
Spain	87
Serbia and Montenegro	75
26 August
Italy	68
Lithuania	71
27 August
Greece	95
China	64
27 August
France	68
Angola	62
27 August
United States	113
Australia	73
27 August
Germany	78
Nigeria	77

Quarter-finals
29 August
Argentina	83
Turkey	58
29 August
Spain	89
Lithuania	67
30 August
Greece	73
France	56
30 August
United States	85
Germany	65

Semi-finals
1 September
Argentina	74
Spain	75
1 September
Greece	101
United States	95

Final
3 September
Spain	70
Greece	47
Third place
2 September
United States	96
Argentina	81

=== Round of 16 ===
26 August 2006
10:00

Argentina	79–62	New Zealand
Scoring by quarter: 21–16, 16–13, 22–15, 20–18
Pts: Oberto 23; Rebs: Oberto 10; Asts: Sánchez 5		Pts: Dickel 15; Rebs: Bradshaw 5 Asts: Dickel 4

Saitama Super Arena, Saitama
Attendance: 9,100

26 August 2006
13:00

Italy	68–71	Lithuania
Scoring by quarter: 20–17, 15–19, 14–14, 19–21
Pts: Rocca, Di Bella 15; Rebs: Di Bella 9 Asts: Soragna 5		Pts: Macijauskas 15; Rebs: Javtokas 8 Asts: Kalnietis 2

Saitama Super Arena, Saitama
Attendance: 9,100

26 August 2006
17:00

Turkey	90–84	Slovenia
Scoring by quarter: 20–19, 24–17, 16–24, 30–24
Pts: Erdoğan 24; Rebs: Gönlüm 8 Asts: Arslan 3		Pts: Nachbar 18; Rebs: Nachbar 8 Asts: Bečirovič 5

Saitama Super Arena, Saitama
Attendance: 8,150

26 August 2006
20:00

Spain	87–75	Serbia and Montenegro
Scoring by quarter: 20–10, 23–21, 23–21, 21–23
Pts: Gasol 19; Rebs: Gasol 15; Asts: Calderón 4		Pts: Miličić 18; Rebs: Miličić 15; Asts: Popović 4

Saitama Super Arena, Saitama
Attendance: 8,150

27 August 2006
10:00

Germany	78–77	Nigeria
Scoring by quarter: 25–22, 23–22, 14–14, 16–19
Pts: Nowitzki 23; Rebs: Nowitzki 9 Asts: Nowitzki 5		Pts: Ibekwe 22; Rebs: Ibekwe 10; Asts: Muoneke 4

Saitama Super Arena, Saitama
Attendance: 14,800

27 August 2006
13:00

United States	113–73	Australia
Scoring by quarter: 27–23, 32–6, 29–20, 25–24
Pts: Johnson 18; Rebs: Bosh 9 Asts: Hinrich 5		Pts: Bogut 20; Rebs: Mackinnon 7 Asts: Bruton 4

Saitama Super Arena, Saitama
Attendance: 14,800

27 August 2006
17:00

France	68–62	Angola
Scoring by quarter: 17–6, 17–18, 15–11, 19–27
Pts: Jeanneau 16; Rebs: Piétrus 7 Asts: Jeanneau 5		Pts: Almeida 13; Rebs: Gomes 7 Asts: Cipriano 7

Saitama Super Arena, Saitama
Attendance: 12,900

27 August 2006
20:00

Greece	95–64	China
Scoring by quarter: 11–18, 30–18, 26–6, 28–22
Pts: Papaloukas 19; Rebs: Kakiouzis 7 Asts: Papaloukas 6		Pts: Wang S 16; Rebs: Yao 8 Asts: Chen, Zhu, Sun 2

Saitama Super Arena, Saitama
Attendance: 12,900

=== Quarterfinals ===
29 August 2006
16:30

Spain	89–67	Lithuania
Scoring by quarter: 28–11, 19–19, 18–12, 24–25
Pts: Gasol 25; Rebs: Gasol 9 Asts: Navarro, Rodríguez 3		Pts: Lavrinovič 17; Rebs: Kleiza 14; Asts: Kleiza 5

Saitama Super Arena, Saitama
Attendance: 8,700

29 August 2006
19:30

Argentina	83–58	Turkey
Scoring by quarter: 25–16, 18–7, 32–17, 8–18
Pts: Nocioni 21; Rebs: Delfino 8 Asts: Sánchez 6		Pts: Akyol 11; Rebs: Peker 6 Asts: Demirel 4

Saitama Super Arena, Saitama
Attendance: 8,700

30 August 2006
16:30

Greece	73–56	France
Scoring by quarter: 12–8, 22–16, 19–19, 20–13
Pts: Papadopoulos, Fotsis 14; Rebs: Diamantidis 8 Asts: Diamantidis 5		Pts: Gelabale 12; Rebs: Piétrus, Diaw, Turiaf 6 Asts: Gomis, Jeanneau, Piétrus, Diaw 2

Saitama Super Arena, Saitama

30 August 2006
19:30

United States	85–65	Germany
Scoring by quarter: 23–21, 17–18, 27–13, 18–13
Pts: Anthony 19; Rebs: Wade, Bosh 7 Asts: Paul 5		Pts: Okulaja, Nowitzki 15; Rebs: Okulaja, Nowitzki 9 Asts: Femerling 2

Saitama Super Arena, Saitama

=== 5th–8th classification ===
Classification round
31 August
Lithuania	84
Turkey (OT)	95
31 August
France	75
Germany	73

Fifth place
2 September
Turkey	56
France	64
Seventh place
3 September
Lithuania	77
Germany	62

==== 5th–8th classification ====
31 August 2006
16:30

Lithuania	84–95 (OT)	Turkey
Scoring by quarter: 10–19, 17–4, 21–17, 27–35, Overtime: 9–20
Pts: Songaila 17; Rebs: Lavrinovič 7 Asts: Lavrinovič 4		Pts: Kuqo 24; Rebs: Gönlüm 8 Asts: Arslan 5

Saitama Super Arena, Saitama

31 August 2006
19:30

France	75–73	Germany
Scoring by quarter: 17–16, 21–15, 15–26, 22–16
Pts: Gomis 17; Rebs: Gelabale, Diaw 8 Asts: Diaw 3		Pts: Nowitzki 29; Rebs: Okulaja 10; Asts: Okulaja 4

Saitama Super Arena, Saitama

==== Seventh place playoff ====
3 September 2006
16:30

Lithuania	77–62	Germany
Scoring by quarter: 30–17, 17–24, 11–13, 19–8
Pts: Lavrinovič 18; Rebs: Kleiza 7 Asts: Javtokas 3		Pts: Nowitzki 18; Rebs: Okulaja, Nowitzki 6 Asts: Roller 3

Saitama Super Arena, Saitama

==== Fifth place playoff ====
2 September 2006
16:30

Turkey	56–64	France
Scoring by quarter: 7–20, 13–15, 23–14, 13–15
Pts: Atsür 15; Rebs: Gönlüm 11; Asts: Atsür, Arslan, İlyasova, Gönlüm 1		Pts: Pietrus 12; Rebs: Pietrus 9 Asts: Diaw 3

Saitama Super Arena, Saitama

=== Semifinals ===
1 September 2006
16:30

Greece	101–95	United States
Scoring by quarter: 14–20, 31–21, 32–24, 24–30
Pts: Spanoulis 22; Rebs: Kakiouzis 6 Asts: Papaloukas 12		Pts: Anthony 27; Rebs: Howard 7 Asts: James 5

Saitama Super Arena, Saitama
Attendance: 17,000

1 September 2006
19:30

Spain	75–74	Argentina
Scoring by quarter: 15–21, 25–17, 20–18, 15–18
Pts: Garbajosa 19; Rebs: Gasol 11; Asts: Navarro 5		Pts: Ginóbili 21; Rebs: Scola 8 Asts: Ginóbili 4

Saitama Super Arena, Saitama
Attendance: 17,000

=== Third place playoff ===
2 September 2006
19:30

United States	96–81	Argentina
Scoring by quarter: 21–27, 29–22, 19–13, 27–19
Pts: Wade 32; Rebs: James 9 Asts: James 7		Pts: Scola 19; Rebs: Sánchez, Nocioni 6 Asts: Sánchez 6

Saitama Super Arena, Saitama
Attendance: 16,700

=== Final ===
3 September 2006
19:30

Greece	47–70	Spain
Scoring by quarter: 12–18, 11–25, 11–11, 13–16
Pts: Kakiouzis 17; Rebs: Kakiouzis 9 Asts: Papaloukas, Diamantidis 3		Pts: Garbajosa, Navarro 20; Rebs: Jiménez 11; Asts: Garbajosa, Rodríguez 4

Saitama Super Arena, Saitama
Attendance: 18,500
Referees: Carl Jungebrand (FIN), Terry Moore (USA), Pablo Alberto Estévez (ARG)

Since the inaugural competition in 1950 the five competing countries for the title had always been two of Argentina, United States, Soviet Union, Brazil and Yugoslavia, one of which always being either United States or Yugoslavia. After the dissolution of the Soviet Union, Russia took its place in the finals of 1994 and 1998, and after the breakup of Yugoslavia, FR Yugoslavia took its place in the finals of 1998 and 2002. The 2006 final was the first and only one in which none of these five teams competed.

The final was an unexpectedly one-sided game, with Spain dominating from the beginning and limiting Greece to 47 points, the fewest points they scored in any game in the tournament. Spain won despite losing power forward Pau Gasol to injury in the semifinals. Gasol was ultimately named the tournament's most valuable player.

== Final standings ==
- Teams that were eliminated at the round of 16 are officially tied for 9th.
- Teams that were 5th at their preliminary rounds are officially tied for 17th.
- Teams that were 6th at their preliminary rounds are officially tied for 21st.

Rank	Team	Record
1	Spain	9–0
2	Greece	8–1
3	United States	8–1
4	Argentina	7–2
5	France	6–3
6	Turkey	6–3
7	Lithuania	5–4
8	Germany	5–4
9	Angola	3–3
9	Australia	2–4
9	China	2–4
9	Italy	4–2
9	New Zealand	2–4
9	Nigeria	2–4
9	Serbia and Montenegro	2–4
9	Slovenia	2–4
17	Brazil	1–4
17	Japan	1–4
17	Lebanon	2–3
17	Puerto Rico	2–3
21	Panama	0–5
21	Qatar	0–5
21	Senegal	0–5
21	Venezuela	1–4

== All-Tournament Team ==
- (Spain) Pau Gasol
- (Spain) Jorge Garbajosa
- (United States) Carmelo Anthony
- (Argentina) Manu Ginóbili
- (Greece) Theodoros Papaloukas

== Leading scorers ==
No.	Player	Team	PPG
1	Yao Ming	China	25.3
2	Dirk Nowitzki	Germany	23.2
3	Pau Gasol	Spain	21.3
4	Carlos Arroyo	Puerto Rico	21.2
5	Larry Ayuso	Puerto Rico	21.2

== Referees ==
For the 2006 World Championship, FIBA selected 40 professional referees.

Group A
- (Japan) Aibara, Nobuyasu
- (Iran) Avanessian, Heros
- (Australia) Aylen, Michael
- (Morocco) Chlif, Abdellilah
- (Lithuania) Dovidavičius, Virginijus
- (Italy) Facchini, Fabio
- (Finland) Jungebrand, Carl
- (United States) Moore, Terry Matthew
- (Uruguay) Trías Iglesias, Álvaro Darío
Group B
- (Mozambique) Muhimua Joao, Abreu
- (Serbia and Montenegro) Belošević, Ilija
- (Puerto Rico) Carrión, José Aníbal
- (Argentina) Chiti, Alejandro César
- (Lebanon) Noujaim, Rabah
- (Ukraine) Ryzhyk, Borys
- (Slovakia) Sudek, Petr
- (France) Viator, Eddie
- (China) Yang Maogong
Group C
- (Spain) Arteaga, Juan Carlos
- (Italy) Cerebuch, Guerrino
- (Argentina) Estévez, Pablo Alberto
- (Canada) Homsy, Mike Amir
- (Dominican Republic) Mercedes Sánchez, Reynaldo Antonio
- (Japan) Miyatake, Yosuke
- (Croatia) Muhvić, Dubravko
- (Slovenia) Pukl, Saša
- (United States) Rush, Eddie Fernanzo
- (Puerto Rico) Vázquez, Jorge
Group D
- (Israel) Bachar, Shmuel
- (Lithuania) Brazauskas, Romualdas
- (Australia) Butler, Scott Jason
- (Venezuela) Delgado Casadiego, Daniel Alfredo
- (Japan) Hirahara, Yuji
- (Serbia and Montenegro) Jovčić, Milivoje
- (Brazil) Maranho, Cristiano Jesus
- (Spain) Martín Bertrán, José Antonio
- (Angola) Simão, Domingos Francisco
