= ASCB Boeny =

Malagasy basketball club

- League: Malagasy N1A
- Location: Mahajanga, Boeny, Madagascar
- Championships: 1 Malagasy League

Association Sportive et Culturelle de Boeny, better known as ASCB Boeny, is a Malagasy basketball club based in Mahajanga (Boeny). The team plays in the Malagasy N1A, the national highest level league. The club joined the N1A in 2017, and won the national championship the same year.

== Honours ==
Malagasy N1A

- Champions (1): 2017

Malagasy President Cup

- Champions (1): 2017

== Notable players ==
- Elly Randriamampionona (2014–2018)
