= Vincent Da Sylva =

Senegalese-French basketball player

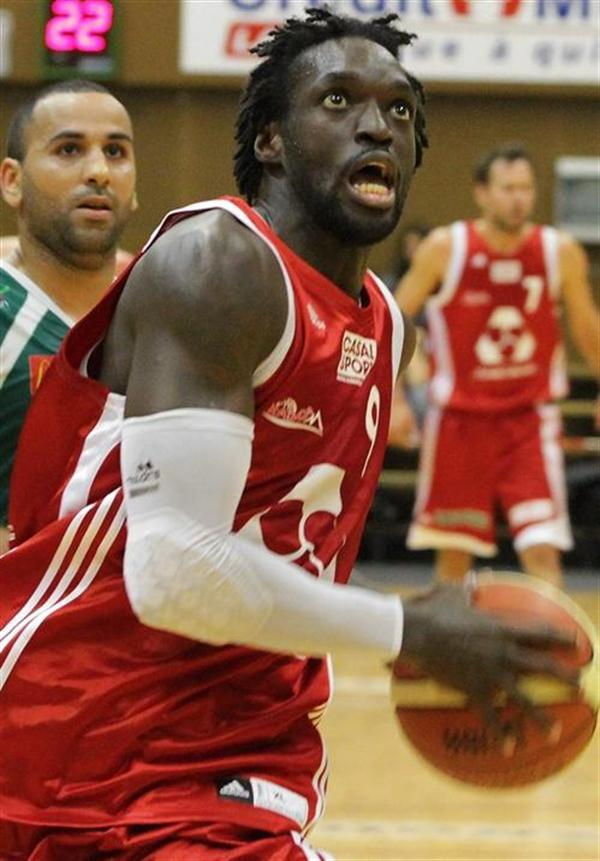

Personal information
- Born: 8 January 1973 (age 53) Ziguinchor, Senegal
- Listed height: 197 cm (6 ft 6 in)
- Listed weight: 90 kg (198 lb)

Career information
- Playing career: 1991–2013
- Position: Forward
- Number: 9

Career history
- 1991–1995: Casa Sports
- 1995–1997: AS Douanes
- 1997–2001: Liban
- 2001–2002: Maurienne

Vincent Da Sylva (born 8 January 1973) is a Senegalese-French retired basketball player. He represented Senegal at the 1998 FIBA World Championship. In his career, he played in Senegal, Lebanon and France.

== Honours ==
- Bronze medal with the Championship of Africa in 1994 (Alexandria, Egypt)
- Gold medal Championship of Africa in 1997 (Dakar, Sénégal)

=== Individual awards ===
- Best Scorer of the Championship of Senegal: 1996-97
- All Star FLB (Lebanon): 1998
