= Jérôme Sanchez =

French basketball player

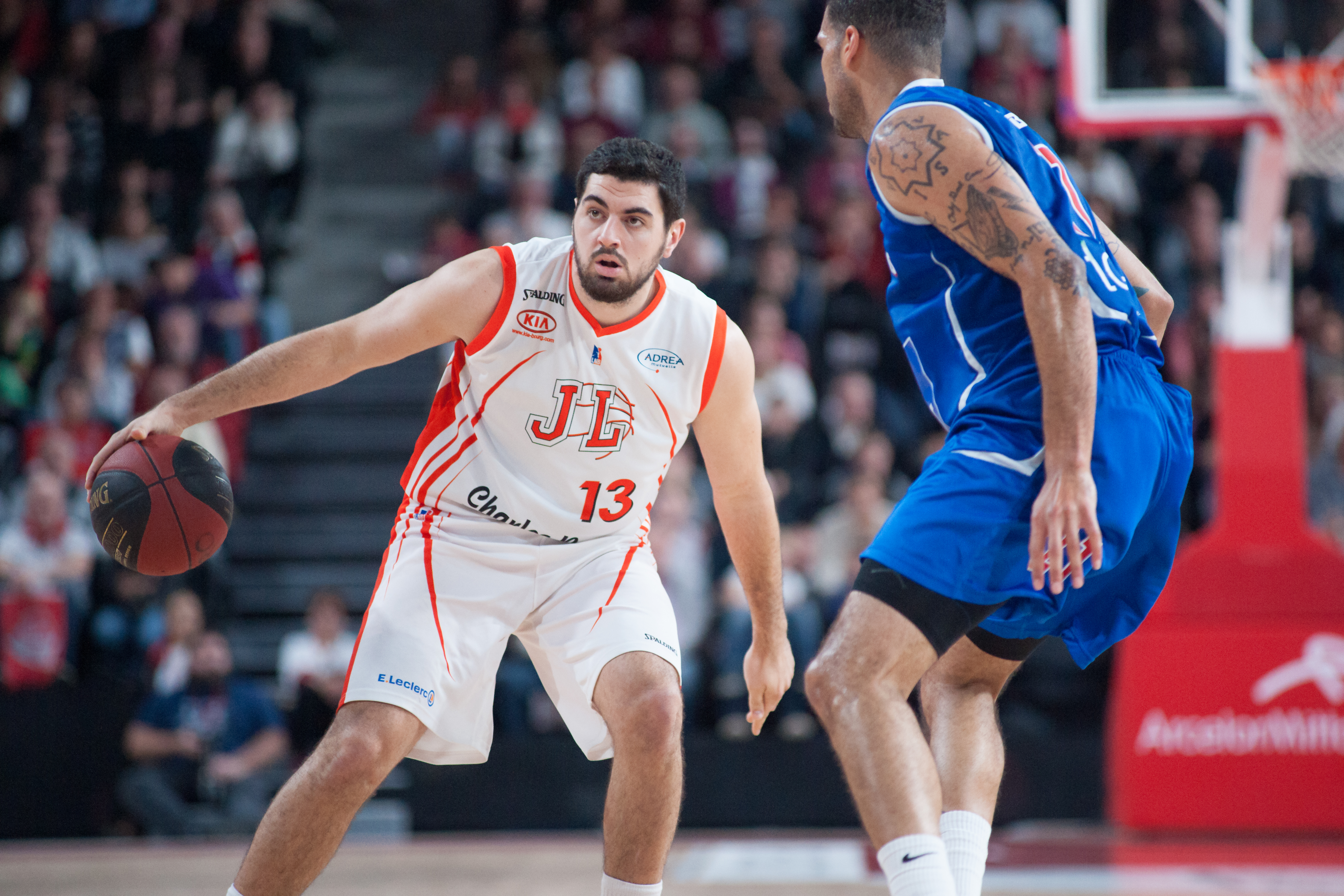
- Sanchez (left) in November 2014

No. 5 – Stade Rochelais
- Position: Forward
- League: Pro A

Personal information
- Born: March 2, 1990 (age 36) Vénissieux, France
- Listed height: 6 ft 6 in (1.98 m)
- Listed weight: 235 lb (107 kg)

Career information
- NBA draft: 2012: undrafted
- Playing career: 2007–present

Career history
- 2007–2008: JL Bourg
- 2008-2010: ASVEL
- 2010–2015: JL Bourg
- 2015–2020: Boulazac Basket Dordogne
- 2022–present: Stade Rochelais

Jérôme Sanchez (born March 2, 1990) is a French professional basketball player for Stade Rochelais of the Pro A.

Sanchez signed with Boulazac on June 17, 2015. He re-signed with the team on July 13, 2017.
