= Antoine Mendy (basketball) =

French-born Senegalese basketball player

Personal information
- Born: August 16, 1983 (age 43) Paris, France
- Listed height: 6 ft 6 in (1.98 m)
- Listed weight: 191 lb (87 kg)

Career information
- Playing career: 2002–2022
- Position: Shooting guard

Career history
- 2002–2004: RPB Rueil
- 2005–2006: BC Boncourt
- 2006–2007: Reims
- 2007–2013: Élan Béarnais
- 2013–2015: Dijon
- 2015–2017: Orléans
- 2017: JL Bourg
- 2019: Lille
- 2019–2020: Rupella
- 2021–2022: Cergy Pontoise
Medals
Men's basketball
Representing Senegal
AfroBasket
Bronze medal – third place	2017 Tunisia/Senegal

Antoine Mendy (born August 16, 1983) is a French-born Senegalese former basketball player.

He represented Senegal's national basketball team at the 2009 African Basketball Championship.
