= Senegal men's national basketball team =

Senegal
- FIBA ranking: 47 ▲1 (1 September 2026)
- Joined FIBA: 1962
- FIBA zone: FIBA Africa
- National federation: Federation Senegalaise de Basketball
- Coach: Cheikh Sarr
- Nickname: The Lions

Olympic Games
- Appearances: 3

FIBA World Cup
- Appearances: 5

AfroBasket
- Appearances: 30
- Medals: Gold: (1968, 1972, 1978, 1980, 1997); Silver: (1970, 1974, 1975, 1992, 1995, 2005); Bronze: (1983, 1989, 1993, 2013, 2017, 2021, 2025)
Home	Away

The Senegal national basketball team (French: Équipe de basketball du Senegal) represents Senegal in men's international basketball and it is overseen by Federation Senegalaise de basketball, five time a gold medallist (in 1968, 1972, 1978, 1980, and 1997), a six time silver medallist, and a four time bronze medallist at the FIBA Africa Championship. Senegal was the first Sub-Saharan African team to qualify for the Summer Olympics Basketball Tournament.

The team has included several players who have competed in the U.S. National Basketball Association, including former Charlotte Bobcats center DeSagana Diop and current Minnesota Timberwolves center Gorgui Dieng, and is considered to be, along with those of Nigeria and Angola, a top African side.

== History ==
Senegal's international participation debuted at the 1968 Summer Olympics. They would have a dominating performance on the African continent at times in the years to follow. Senegal has had many world-elite basketball players, especially at the center position, which helped the team to compete at many major international tournaments. At times, however, the team was overly dependent on its NBA-players. An example was in the mid-2000s, when it struggled with injuries. Having finished as the runner-up to Angola in the 2005 FIBA Africa Championship, Senegal qualified for play in the 2006 FIBA World Championship, where the squad finished last in Group D and twenty-second among the twenty-four sides to have contested the championship, having lost to the United States, Italy, Slovenia, China, and Puerto Rico.

== Performance table ==
=== Olympic Games ===
Year	Position	Tournament	Host
1968	15	1968 Summer Olympics	Mexico City, Mexico
1972	15	1972 Summer Olympics	Munich, Germany
1980	11	1980 Summer Olympics	Moscow, Soviet Union

=== FIBA World Cup ===
Year	Position	Tournament	Host
1978	14	1978 FIBA World Championship	Philippines
1998	15	1998 FIBA World Championship	Greece
2006	22	2006 FIBA World Championship	Japan
2014	16	2014 FIBA Basketball World Cup	Spain
2019	30	2019 FIBA Basketball World Cup	China

=== FIBA Africa Championship ===
Year	Position	Tournament	Host
1962	–	FIBA Africa Championship 1962	Cairo, Egypt
1964	5	FIBA Africa Championship 1964	Casablanca, Morocco
1965	4	FIBA Africa Championship 1965	Tunis, Tunisia
1968	1st place, gold medalist(s)	FIBA Africa Championship 1968	Casablanca, Morocco
1970	2nd place, silver medalist(s)	FIBA Africa Championship 1970	Alexandria, Egypt
1972	1st place, gold medalist(s)	FIBA Africa Championship 1972	Dakar, Senegal
1974	2nd place, silver medalist(s)	FIBA Africa Championship 1974	Bangui, Central African Republic
1975	2nd place, silver medalist(s)	FIBA Africa Championship 1975	Alexandria, Egypt
1978	1st place, gold medalist(s)	FIBA Africa Championship 1978	Dakar, Senegal
1980	1st place, gold medalist(s)	FIBA Africa Championship 1980	Rabat, Morocco
1981	5	FIBA Africa Championship 1981	Mogadishu, Somalia
1983	3rd place, bronze medalist(s)	FIBA Africa Championship 1983	Alexandria, Egypt
1985	4	FIBA Africa Championship 1985	Abidjan, Côte d'Ivoire
1987	6	FIBA Africa Championship 1987	Tunis, Tunisia
1989	3rd place, bronze medalist(s)	FIBA Africa Championship 1989	Luanda, Angola
1992	2nd place, silver medalist(s)	FIBA Africa Championship 1992	Cairo, Egypt
1993	3rd place, bronze medalist(s)	FIBA Africa Championship 1993	Nairobi, Kenya
1995	2nd place, silver medalist(s)	FIBA Africa Championship 1995	Algiers, Algeria
1997	1st place, gold medalist(s)	FIBA Africa Championship 1997	Dakar, Senegal
1999	7	FIBA Africa Championship 1999	Angola
2001	7	FIBA Africa Championship 2001	Morocco
2003	4	FIBA Africa Championship 2003	Alexandria, Egypt
2005	2nd place, silver medalist(s)	FIBA Africa Championship 2005	Algiers, Algeria
2007	9	FIBA Africa Championship 2007	Angola
2009	7	FIBA Africa Championship 2009	Libya
2011	5	FIBA Africa Championship 2011	Antananarivo, Madagascar
2013	3rd place, bronze medalist(s)	FIBA Africa Championship 2013	Côte d'Ivoire
2015	4	FIBA Africa Championship 2015	Radès, Tunisia
2017	3rd place, bronze medalist(s)	AfroBasket 2017	Senegal/Tunisia
2021	3rd place, bronze medalist(s)	AfroBasket 2021	Rwanda
2025	3rd place, bronze medalist(s)	AfroBasket 2025	Angola

=== African Games ===
- 1965 – (silver)
- 1973 – 4th
- 1978 – (gold)
- 1987 – (silver)
- 1991 – (bronze)
- 1999 – 5th
- 2003 – (silver)

== Team ==
=== Current roster ===
Roster for the AfroBasket 2025.

Senegal men's national basketball team roster
Players
Coaches

Pos.	No.	Name	Age – Date of birth	Height	Club	Ctr.
SG	0	Brancou Badio (C)	26 – 17 February 1999	1.88 m (6 ft 2 in)	Valencia Basket	(Spain)
F	1	Ousmane Ndiaye	21 – 19 March 2004	2.10 m (6 ft 11 in)	Tornadoes Sports Academy	(Grenada)
SG	3	Makhtar Gueye	28 – 7 January 1997	2.09 m (6 ft 10 in)	ASC Ville de Dakar	(Senegal)
G	5	Jean Jacques Boissy	25 – 28 January 2000	1.83 m (6 ft 0 in)	REG BBC	(Rwanda)
PF	7	Ibrahima Faye	28 – 10 January 1997	2.09 m (6 ft 10 in)	Shanxi Loongs	(China)
C	11	Ibrahima Diallo	25 – 10 December 1999	2.13 m (7 ft 0 in)	Austin Spurs	(United States)
C	16	Ibou Badji	22 – 13 October 2002	2.11 m (6 ft 11 in)	Wisconsin Herd	(United States)
C	29	Gora Camara	24 – 12 April 2001	2.12 m (6 ft 11 in)	Rinascita Basket Rimini	(Italy)
SG	33	Babacar Diallo	24 – 30 December 2000	2.00 m (6 ft 7 in)	High Point Panthers	(United States)
PF	43	Amar Sylla	23 – 1 October 2001	2.05 m (6 ft 9 in)	Bilbao Basket	(Spain)
G	45	Karim Mané	25 – 16 May 2000	1.93 m (6 ft 4 in)	Calgary Surge	(Canada)
F	77	Pape Moustapha Diop	29 – 1 January 1996	2.02 m (6 ft 8 in)	JA Vichy Basket	(France)

Head coach

- (Senegal) DeSagana Diop

Assistant coach(es)

- (Senegal) Mamadou Gueye
- (Senegal) Elhadj Mbodji

Legend

- (C) Team captain
- Club – describes last
  club before the tournament
- Age – describes age
  on 12 August 2025

=== Famous former players ===
- DeSagana Diop

=== Head coach position ===
- (Senegal) Abdourahmane N'Diaye – 2005
- (United States) Sam Vincent – 2007
- (Senegal) Parfaito Adjivon – 2009
- (Senegal) Abdourahmane N'Diaye – 2009–10
- (France) Alain Weisz – 2011
- (Senegal) Cheikh Sarr – 2012–2015
- (Spain) Porfirio Fisac – 2016–2017
- (Senegal) Moustapha Gaye – 2019–2020
- (Senegal) Boniface N'Dong – 2020–present

=== Past rosters ===
1968 Olympic Games: finished 15th among 16 teams

Cheikh Fall, Moussa Sene, Alioune Gueye, Babacar Dia, Papa Diop, Mousse N'Diaye, Babacar Traore, Claude Sadio, Claude Constantino, Babacar Seck, Mansour Diagne, Doudou Camara (Coach: Alioune Diop)

1972 Olympic Games: finished 15th among 16 teams

Cheikh Fall, Babacar Traore, Mohamadou Diop, Babacar Seck, Papa Diop, Alioune Gueye, Pierre Sagna, Abdourahmane N'Diaye, Sylvestre Lopis, Assane Thiam, Joseph Diandy, Doudou Camara (Coach: Amadou Diaw)

1978 World Championship: finished 14th among 14 teams

Mathieu Faye, Bireyma Sadi Diagne, Madiagne N'Diaye, A.Diouf, B.Kaba, J.Lopez, M.Diagne, M.Gueye, J.Toupane, A.Diop, A.Dogue, L.Diop (Coach: I.Diagne)

1980 Olympic Games: finished 11th among 12 teams

Mathieu Faye, Madiagne N'Diaye, Mohamadou Diop, Oumar Dia, Mamadou Diop, Bassirou Badji, Yamar Samb, Bireyma Sadi Diagne, Yaya Cissokho, Modou Tall, Moussa M'Bengue, Hadrame N'Diaye (Coach: Ibrahima Diagne)

1998 World Championship: finished 15th among 16 teams

Makhtar N'Diaye, Mamadou Diouf, Mamadou N'Diaye, Cheikh Yaya Dia, Raymond Carvalho, Mouhamadou Sow, Assane N'Diaye, Boubacar Aw, Kader Malik Fall, Vincent Da Sylva, Samba Aly Ngone Niang, Omer Ba (Coach: Ousseynou Ndiaga Diop)

2006 World Championship: finished 22nd among 24 teams

Makhtar N'Diaye, Babacar Cisse, Mamadou Diouf, Sitapha Savane, Malick Badiane, Mamadou N'Diaye, El Kabir Pene, Pape Ibrahim Faye, Mouhamadou Niang, Souleymane Aw, N'Dongo N'Diaye, Meleye N'Doye (Coach: Moustapha Gaye)

2014 World Championship: finished 16th among 24 teams

Senegal men's national basketball team - 2014 FIBA Basketball World Cup roster
Players
Coaches

Pos.	No.	Name	Age – Date of birth	Height	Club
G	4	Thierno Niang	24 – 8 March 1990	1.85 m (6 ft 1 in)	Milwaukee Panthers	(United States)
G	5	Xane D'Almeida	31 – 21 January 1983	1.83 m (6 ft 0 in)	Tarbes–Lourdes	(France)
F	6	Ibrahima Thomas	27 – 7 February 1987	2.11 m (6 ft 11 in)	Azad University	(Iran)
G	7	Mamadou N'Doye	34 – 6 October 1979	1.91 m (6 ft 3 in)	UGB	(Senegal)
F	8	Mohamed Diop	33 – 14 May 1981	1.98 m (6 ft 6 in)	UGB	(Senegal)
F	9	Maleye N'Doye	34 – 19 August 1980	2.03 m (6 ft 8 in)	Paris-Levallois Basket	(France)
F	10	Djibril Thiam	28 – 6 July 1986	2.06 m (6 ft 9 in)	Toyama Grouses	(Japan)
F	11	Mouhammad Faye	28 – 14 September 1985	2.08 m (6 ft 10 in)	Panelefsiniakos	(Greece)
F	12	Maurice Ndour	22 – 18 June 1992	2.06 m (6 ft 9 in)	Ohio Bobcats	(United States)
C	13	Hamady N'Diaye	27 – 12 January 1987	2.13 m (7 ft 0 in)	Guangxi Rhinos	(China)
C	14	Gorgui Dieng	24 – 18 January 1990	2.11 m (6 ft 11 in)	Minnesota Timberwolves	(United States)
F	15	Abdou Badji	22 – 4 April 1992	2.06 m (6 ft 9 in)	Neuchâtel Basket	(Switzerland)

Head coach

- (Senegal) Cheikh Sarr

Legend

- Club – describes last
  club before the tournament
- Age – describes age
  on 30 August 2014

Team for the 2015 AfroBasket:

Senegal men's national basketball team roster
Players
Coaches

Pos.	No.	Name	Age – Date of birth	Height	Club
G	4	Thierno Niang	25 – 8 March 1990	1.85 m (6 ft 1 in)	Geish Army	(Egypt)
G	5	Xane D'Almeida	32 – 21 January 1983	1.83 m (6 ft 0 in)	Tarbes–Lourdes	(France)
F	6	Ibrahima Thomas	28 – 7 February 1987	2.11 m (6 ft 11 in)	Al-Muharraq SC	(Bahrain)
SF	7	Mohamed Diop	34 – 14 May 1981	1.98 m (6 ft 6 in)	Escuela de Oficiales de la Fap	(Peru)
F	8	Antoine Mendy	32 – 16 August 1983	1.98 m (6 ft 6 in)	Orléans Loiret Basket	(France)
F	9	Maleye N'Doye	35 – 19 August 1980	1.99 m (6 ft 6 in)	Paris-Levallois Basket	(France)
G	10	Ibrahima Mbengue	32 – 13 October 1982	2.03 m (6 ft 8 in)	AS Douanes Dakar	(Senegal)
F	11	Mouhammad Faye	29 – 14 September 1985	2.06 m (6 ft 9 in)	Pallacanestro Varese	(Italy)
C	12	Mouhamed Sene	29 – 12 May 1986	2.12 m (6 ft 11 in)	Austin Spurs	(United States)
C	13	Cheikh Mbodj	28 – 1 August 1987	2.08 m (6 ft 10 in)	Czarni Słupsk	(Poland)
C	14	Gorgui Dieng	25 – 18 January 1990	2.11 m (6 ft 11 in)	Minnesota Timberwolves	(United States)
F/C	15	Abdou Badji	23 – 4 April 1992	2.08 m (6 ft 10 in)	SAM Massagno Basket	(Switzerland)

Head coach

- (Senegal) Cheikh Sarr

Assistant coach(es)

- (Senegal) Parfait Adjivon
- (Senegal) Raoul Toupane

Legend

- Club – describes last
  club before the tournament
- Age – describes age
  on 19 August 2015

== Kit ==
=== Manufacturer ===
2015 – Nike

=== Sponsor ===
2015 – Orange

== See also ==
- Senegal national under-19 basketball team
- Senegal national under-17 basketball team
- Senegal national 3x3 team
- Senegal women's national basketball team
