= GNBC (basketball) =

- Leagues: Malagasy N1A
- Founded: 2012
- History: GNBC (2012–present)
- Arena: Palais des Sports Mahamasina (Antananarivo)
- Capacity: 7,090
- Location: Antsirabe, Vakinankaratra, Madagascar
- President: Filamatra Ravoavy
- Head coach: Lova Navalona Raharidera
- Championships: 4 (2016, 2019, 2023, 2024)
- President's Cup titles: 4 (2016, 2018, 2022, 2025)
Home	Away

Gendarmerie Nationale Basketball Club, commonly known as GNBC, is a Malagasy basketball club based in Antsirabe, Vakinankaratra. The team plays in the Malagasy N1A and played in the inaugural season of the Basketball Africa League (BAL). Established in 2012, the team has won its national championship four times.

== History ==
The public sports institution GNBC was established in 2012. In September 2019, GNBC grabbed the N1A title after edging COSPN in the final. As national champions, GNBC played in the first round of the qualifying tournament of the Basketball Africa League (BAL). In the first round, the team finished second in its group and advanced to the second round. On 21 December 2019, GNBC qualified for the inaugural BAL season, after surprisingly beating Ferroviário Maputo in the semi-finals.

In the inaugural season of the BAL, GNBC played in Group A and lost all three games to Patriots BBC, Rivers Hoopers and US Monastir.

GNBC waited four more years until it next national title, which came on 30 October 2023, following a 89-71 win over ASCUT in the final. The team was led by final MVP Elly Randriamampionona, who scored 43 points and had 17 rebounds in the final. They won another championship in 2024.

== Honours ==
- N1A

Winners (4): 2016, 2019, 2023, 2024

- Malagasy President's Cup

Winners (4): 2016, 2018, 2022, 2025

- N1A Western Conference Cup

Winners (1): 2022

- Indian Ocean Club Championships

Runners-up (2): 2016, 2017

== Players ==
=== Current roster ===
The following is the GNBC roster for the 2021 BAL season:

Note: Flags indicate national team eligibility at FIBA-sanctioned events. Players may hold other non-FIBA nationalities not displayed.

GNBC roster
Players
Coaches

Pos.	No.	Nat.	Name	Ht.	Age
C	00	(Madagascar)	Solondrainy, Alpha	1.98 m (6 ft 6 in)	30 – 4 May 1995
SG	1	(Madagascar)	Randriamampionona, Elly	1.88 m (6 ft 2 in)	27 – 20 July 1997
PG	2	(Madagascar)	Sen Chan, Zico	1.80 m (5 ft 11 in)	26 – 30 January 1999
PG	5	(Madagascar)	Razanamahenina, Kiady	1.84 m (6 ft 0 in)	28 – 15 December 1996
SG	7	(Madagascar)	Ramorasata, Ndranto	1.74 m (5 ft 9 in)	35 – 27 May 1989
PG	8	(Madagascar)	Ralison, Andriantsara	1.74 m (5 ft 9 in)	34 – 11 August 1990
F	11	(Madagascar)	Mory, Francis (C)	1.93 m (6 ft 4 in)	34 – 4 April 1991
C	12	(Madagascar)	Chanel, Chancy	1.93 m (6 ft 4 in)	39 – 25 January 1986
C	15	(Madagascar)	Rasolomanana, Anthony	1.98 m (6 ft 6 in)	28 – 2 May 1997
C	21	(Madagascar)	Loubacky, Rick-Ley	1.98 m (6 ft 6 in)	28 – 27 December 1996
G	23	(Madagascar)	Mandimbison, Constant	1.95 m (6 ft 5 in)	34 – 22 August 1990
C	55	(United States)	Ridley, Cameron (I)	2.06 m (6 ft 9 in)	31 – 27 October 1993

Head coach

- (Madagascar) Lova Navalona Raharidera

Assistant coach(es)

- (Madagascar) Daniel Rabearimanana

Legend

- (C) Team captain
- (I) Import player
- Injured

- Roster
Updated: 16 May 2020
