= N1A =

Malagasy N1A
- Organising body: Madagascar Basketball Federation
- Country: Madagascar
- Confederation: FIBA Africa
- Number of teams: 12
- Level on pyramid: 1
- Domestic cup: Coupe du President
- International cup: Basketball Africa League (BAL)
- Current champions: COSPN (5th title) (2026)
- Most championships: ASCUT (6 titles)

The N1A is the premier basketball league for men' s teams in Madagascar. Currently, 12 teams play in the competition to determine the national champions of Madagascar.

The defending champions are COSPN, who have won the 2025 season. ASCUT holds the record for most titles with six championships.

The winners of each N1A season play in the Road to BAL, the qualifying rounds of the Basketball Africa League (BAL).

== Format ==
The season begins with 12 teams in two conferences (West and East), the top four qualify for the Elite 8. The bottom team from each group is relegated to the N1B (the national second level). The top four teams from the Elite 8 advance to the Final Four that are played in a best-of-three series to determine the N1A champion.

== Teams ==
These were the 12 teams of the 2022 season:

Team	Location
Western Conference
Cosmos	Atsimo Andrefana
SEBAM	Boeny
GNBC	Vakinankaratra
TGBC	Boeny
MB2ALL	Antananarivo
SBC	Vakinankaratra
MCB	Antsinanana
Eastern Conference
ASCB Boeny	Boeny
COSPN	Analamanga
COSPN 2	Analamanga
ASCUT	Toamasina
ASCB Boeny	Boeny
AS Fanalamanga	Alaotra-Mangoro

== Winners ==
Year	Winner	Runners-up	Third place	Ref.
2007	SEBAM Boeny (1)			
2008	ASCUT (1)			
2010	SEBAM Boeny (2)			
2011	ASCUT (2)			
2012	ASCUT (3)			
2013	ASCUT (4)	COSFA		
2014	ASCUT (5)	COSFA	COSPN	
2015	SEBAM Boeny (3)			
2016	GNBC (1)	COSPN	ASCUT	
2017	ASCB Boeny (1)	SBBC Boeny	ASCUT	
2018	COSPN (1)	ASCB Boeny	Cosmos	
2019	GNBC (2)	COSPN	ASCB Boeny	
2020–21	ASCUT (6)	GNBC	SEBAM Boeny	
2021	COSPN (2)	SEBAM Boeny	GNBC	
2022	COSPN (3)	ASCUT		
2023	GNBC (3)	ASCUT		
2024	GNBC (4)	ASCUT		
2025	COSPN (4)	GNBC		
2026	COSPN (4)	BCB Boeny		

=== Performance by club ===
Club	Wins	Runners-up	Seasons won	Seasons runners-up
ASCUT	6	3	2008, 2011, 2012, 2013, 2014, 2021	2022, 2023, 2024
COSPN	5	2	2018, 2021, 2022, 2025, 2026	2016, 2019
GNBC	4	2	2016, 2019, 2023, 2024	2021, 2025
SEBAM Boeny	3	1	2007, 2010, 2015	2021
ASCB Boeny	1	1	2017	2018
SBBC Boeny	0	1	–	2017
COSFA	0	2	–	2013, 2014

== Coupe du President ==
In Madagascar, the national federation also organises a cup competition called the Coupe du President (English: President's Cup).

Year	Winners	Runners-up	Score	Third place	MVP	Ref.
2015	ASCUT	COSFA	80–75	GNBC		
2016	GNBC	COSPN	79–72	ASCUT	Ndranto Marosata	
2017	ASCB Boeny	TMBB Analamanga				
2018	GNBC	ASCUT	98–92	MB2ALL	Fabrice Constantinides	
2022	GNBC	COSPN		ASCUT		
2025	GNBC	RBC Boeny	83–49	MBC Atsinanana		
