= Kiady Razanamahenina =

Malagasy basketball player (born 1996)

Lyonso
- Position: Point guard
- League: Nationale Masculin 1

Personal information
- Born: 15 December 1996 (age 29) Longjumeau, France
- Listed height: 1.84 m (6 ft 0 in)
- Listed weight: 77 kg (170 lb)

Career information
- NBA draft: 2018: undrafted
- Playing career: 2014–present

Career history
- 2014–2015: Mulhouse
- 2015–2017: BC Porte
- 2017–2018: Troys
- 2018–2019: Cergy Pontoise
- 2019–2020: Sorgues BC
- 2020–2021: GET Vosges
- 2021: GNBC
- 2021–2022: JSA Bordeaux
- 2022: Stade Rochelais
- 2023: BC Boncourt
- 2023-present: Lyonso

Kiady Mijoro Razanamahenina (born 15 December 1996) is a Malagasy basketball player who plays for Lyonso. Standing at 1.84 m (6 ft 1/2 in), he plays as point guard. Razanamahenina also plays for the Madagascar national team.

== Professional career ==
Born in Longjumeau, France, Razanamahenina played youth basketball with Union Paray Athis Basket. The beginning of his professional career, he played for several teams in the French lower leagues.

In the 2020–21 season, he played with GET Vosges in the Nationale Masculine 1, the French third tier league.

In 2021, Razanamahenina was signed by GNBC to play for the team in the inaugural season of the Basketball Africa League (BAL) in May.

In July 2021, Razanamahenina signed with JSA Bordeaux.

In 2022, he played for Stade Rochelais of the LNB Pro B. In March 2023, he joined BC Boncourt of the Swiss Basketball League (SBL).

Razanamahenina joined Lyonso of the French NM1 in August 2023.

== National team career ==
In 2021, Razanamahenina was called up for the Madagascar senior national team for the first time to play in the AfroBasket 2021 qualifiers.

== BAL career statistics ==
Legend
GP	Games played	GS	Games started	MPG	Minutes per game
FG%	Field goal percentage	3P%	3-point field goal percentage	FT%	Free throw percentage
RPG	Rebounds per game	APG	Assists per game	SPG	Steals per game
BPG	Blocks per game	PPG	Points per game	**Bold**	Career high

Year	Team	GP	GS	MPG	FG%	3P%	FT%	RPG	APG	SPG	BPG	PPG
2021	GNBC	3	2	26.9	.395	.412	.667	2.0	6.0	0.7	.0	13.0
Career		3	2	26.9	.395	.412	.667	2.0	6.0	0.7	.0	13.0
