= FIBA Africa Championship 1975 =

1975 FIBA AfroBasket
8th FIBA African Basketball Championship

Tournament details
- Host country: Egypt
- Dates: December 20-28
- Teams: 6 (from 34 federations)
- Venue: 1 (in 1 host city)

Final positions
- Champions: Egypt (4th title)

The FIBA Africa Championship 1975 was hosted by Egypt from December 20 to December 28, 1975. The games were played in Alexandria. Egypt won the tournament, its fourth African Championship, and a berth in the 1976 Summer Olympics by going undefeated in the round robin format.

== Competing nations ==
The following national teams competed:

Congo
Egypt
Senegal
Sudan
Tunisia
Zaire

== Round robin ==
Team	Pld	W	L
Egypt	5	5	0
Senegal	5	3	2
Sudan	5	3	2
Zaire	5	2	3
Tunisia	5	2	3
Congo	5	0	5

Tunisia	105–104	Congo
Senegal	83–68	Sudan
Egypt	79–65	Zaire
Sudan	82–71	Tunisia
Senegal	89–68	Zaire
Egypt	92–62	Congo
Sudan	81–78	Zaire
Egypt	75–70	Tunisia
Senegal	79–50	Congo
Egypt	89–71	Sudan
Zaire	83–68	Congo
Tunisia	84–64	Senegal
Sudan	93–62	Congo
Zaire	101–81	Tunisia
Egypt	70–61	Senegal
