= Cameron Ridley =

American basketball player (born 1993)

Personal information
- Born: October 27, 1993 (age 33) Fayetteville, North Carolina, U.S.
- Listed height: 6 ft 10 in (2.08 m)
- Listed weight: 306 lb (139 kg)

Career information
- High school: Fort Bend Bush (Richmond, Texas)
- College: Texas (2012–2016)
- NBA draft: 2016: undrafted
- Playing career: 2016–present
- Position: Center

Career history
- 2016–2017: Hiroshima Dragonflies
- 2017–2018: Nishinomiya Storks
- 2021: GNBC
- 2022-2023: Bumi Borneo Pontianak

Career highlights
- McDonald's All-American (2012)

Cameron DeVon Ridley (born October 27, 1993) is an American professional basketball player who last played for Bumi Borneo Pontianak of the Indonesian Basketball League (IBL).

== Career ==
Ridley was a former McDonald's All-American. In his four-year career at Texas, he averaged 8.2 points, 6.3 rebounds and 1.9 blocks per game. Ridley averaged 11.1 points, a team-high 8.5 rebounds and 2.8 blocks per game as a senior. He played in 13 games before fracturing his foot and missing all of conference play. He played for the Chicago Bulls in NBA Summer League.

In April 2021, Ridley signed with GNBC from Madagascar ahead of the 2021 BAL season. He made his BAL debut against US Monastir and scored 12 points before falling out with an injury.

== BAL career statistics ==
Legend
GP	Games played	GS	Games started	MPG	Minutes per game
FG%	Field goal percentage	3P%	3-point field goal percentage	FT%	Free throw percentage
RPG	Rebounds per game	APG	Assists per game	SPG	Steals per game
BPG	Blocks per game	PPG	Points per game	**Bold**	Career high

Year	Team	GP	GS	MPG	FG%	3P%	FT%	RPG	APG	SPG	BPG	PPG
2021	GNBC	1	1	16.7	.750	–	–	2.0	.0	2.0	.0	12.0
Career		1	1	16.7	.750	–	–	2.0	.0	2.0	.0	12.0
