= Aymeric Jeanneau =

French basketball player

Personal information
- Born: 10 October 1978 (age 48) La Roche-sur-Yon
- Listed height: 6 ft 2 in (1.88 m)

Career information
- Playing career: 1996–present
- Position: Point guard

Career history
- 1996–2003: Cholet Basket
- 2003–2004: STB Le Havre
- 2004–2006: Strasbourg IG
- 2006–2010: ASVEL Basket
- 2010–2013: Strasbourg IG
Medals
Men's basketball
Representing France
European U-18 Championship
Silver medal – second place	1996 France	U-18 Team

Aymeric Jeanneau (born 10 October 1978) is a French professional basketball player. He is a 1.85 m (6 ft 1 in) tall point guard.

== Biography ==
He started his career at Saint-Fulgent before joining the centre of excellence at Cholet Basket. He stayed at Cholet for a long time, under the management of Éric Girard, whom he followed to STB Le Havre and SIG. Jeanneau won the French Championship title with SIG in 2004/2005. Aymeric then had the chance to play in the Euroleague with the Strasbourg team in the 2005/2006 season. At the end of this season, he decided to leave SIG to move to ASVEL where he rejoined Laurent Foirest, his teammate at the 2006 FIBA World Championship in Japan with the French team.

The new Villeurbanne player was then announced as the reserve for Tony Parker for EuroBasket 2007 in Spain. However, a meniscus injury after only a few days into the tournament meant that he missed the rest of the competition.

== Honors ==
- French Championships : 2005, 2009
- Coupe de France : 1998, 1999, 2008
- Match des champions : 2009
- Semaine des As : 2010
- 39 caps for France (as of 11/06/2008).
- 12th best passer in the history of proA (1172).
