= 2003 FIBA Africa Championship =

FIBA Africa Championship

Tournament details
- Host country: Egypt
- City: Alexandria
- Dates: 7–16 August
- Teams: 12
- Venue(s): 1 (in 1 host city)

Final positions
- Champions: Angola (7th title)
- Runners-up: Nigeria
- Third place: Egypt
- Fourth place: Senegal

Tournament statistics
- MVP: (Angola) Miguel Lutonda

The 2003 FIBA Africa Championship was the 22nd FIBA Africa Championship, played under the rules of FIBA, the world governing body for basketball, and the FIBA Africa thereof. The tournament was hosted by Egypt from August 7 to 16 2003.

Angola defeated Nigeria 85–65 in the final to win their seventh title. and securing a spot at the 2004 Summer Olympics.

== Draw ==
Group A	Group B
Algeria; Central African Republic; Egypt; Ivory Coast; Mozambique; Nigeria	Angola; Madagascar; Morocco; Senegal; South Africa; Tunisia

== Preliminary round ==
Times given below are in UTC+2.

=== Group A ===
Qualified for the semi-finals

Team	Pts.	W	L	PF	PA	Diff
Nigeria	9	4	1	366	299	+67
Egypt	9	4	1	431	357	+74
Central African Rep.	8	3	2	399	340	+59
Algeria	7	2	3	376	382	-6
Mozambique	6	1	4	261	402	-141
Ivory Coast	6	1	4	360	413	-53

7 August 2003
21:00

Egypt	98–53	Mozambique

Alexandria

8 August 2003
17:00

Central African Rep.	83–75	Ivory Coast

Alexandria

19:00

Algeria	77–62	Nigeria

Alexandria

9 August 2003
17:00

Algeria	73–62	Mozambique

Alexandria

19:00

Nigeria	83–61	Ivory Coast

Alexandria

21:00

Egypt	91–84	Central African Rep.

Alexandria

10 August 2003
17:00

Mozambique	69–67	Ivory Coast

Alexandria

19:00

Nigeria	69–64	Central African Rep.

Alexandria

21:00

Egypt	86–79	Algeria

Alexandria

12 August 2003
17:00

Central African Rep.	81–36	Mozambique

Alexandria

19:00

Ivory Coast	85–78	Algeria

Alexandria

21:00

Nigeria	69–56	Egypt

Alexandria

13 August 2003
17:00

Nigeria	83–41	Mozambique

Alexandria

19:00

Central African Rep.	87–69	Algeria

Alexandria

21:00

Egypt	100–72	Ivory Coast

Alexandria

=== Group B ===
Qualified for the semi-finals

Team	Pts.	W	L	PF	PA	Diff
Angola	10	5	0	454	307	+147
Senegal	8	3	2	410	363	+47
Tunisia	8	3	2	369	314	+55
Morocco	7	2	3	350	394	-44
South Africa	7	2	3	258	310	-52
Madagascar	5	0	5	249	402	-153

8 August 2003
17:00

South Africa	20–0	Madagascar

Alexandria

19:00

Tunisia	75–63	Morocco

Alexandria

21:00

Angola	73–60	Senegal

Alexandria

9 August 2003
17:00

Angola	101–55	South Africa

Alexandria

19:00

Morocco	76–71	Madagascar

Alexandria

21:00

Senegal	75–71	Tunisia

Alexandria

10 August 2003
17:00

Senegal	112–63	Madagascar

Alexandria

19:00

Angola	71–63	Tunisia

Alexandria

21:00

Morocco	69–50	South Africa

Alexandria

12 August 2003
17:00

Tunisia	91–51	Madagascar

Alexandria

19:00

Angola	106–65	Morocco

Alexandria

21:00

South Africa	79–71	Senegal

Alexandria

13 August 2003
17:00

Angola	103–64	Madagascar

Alexandria

19:00

Tunisia	69–54	South Africa

Alexandria

21:00

Senegal	92–77	Morocco

Alexandria

== Knockout stage ==
=== 11th place match ===
15 August 2003
17:00

Ivory Coast	87–52	Madagascar
Pts: Kouame 21		Pts: Saotra 21

Alexandria

=== 9th place match ===
15 August 2003
19:00

South Africa	77–70	Mozambique
Pts: Molebatsi 19		Pts: Tamele 22

Alexandria

=== 7th place match ===
15 August 2003
15:00

Algeria	82–68	Morocco
Pts: Doubal 19		Pts: Bakkas 21

Alexandria

=== 5th place match ===
15 August 2003
21:00

Central African Rep.	75–64	Tunisia
Pts: Koundjia 20		Pts: Essayed 24

Alexandria

=== Semifinals bracket ===
Semi-finals
August 14–21:00
Angola	64
Egypt	61
August 14–19:00
Nigeria	78
Senegal	55

Final
August 16–21:00
Angola	85
Nigeria	65
Third place
August 16–19:00
Egypt	81
Senegal	79

14 August 2003
19:00

Nigeria	78–55	Senegal
Pts: Muoneke 21		Pts: Diallo 18

Alexandria

21:00

Angola	82–68	Egypt
Pts: Lutonda 20		Pts: Mounir 14

Alexandria

=== Bronze medal match ===
16 August 2003
19:00

Egypt	81–79	Senegal
Pts: Moneim 20		Pts: Diallo 20

Alexandria

=== Final ===
16 August 2003
21:00

Angola	85–65	Nigeria
Scoring by quarter: 22-24, 18-8, 18-10, 27-23
Pts: Baduna 20		Pts: Muoneke 21

Alexandria

== Final standings ==
Qualified for the 2004 Summer Olympics

Rank	Team	Record
1st place, gold medalist(s)	Angola	7–0
2nd place, silver medalist(s)	Nigeria	5–2
3rd place, bronze medalist(s)	Egypt	5–2
4	Senegal	3–4
5	Central African Rep.	4–2
6	Tunisia	3–3
7	Algeria	3–3
8	Morocco	2–4
9	South Africa	3–3
10	Mozambique	1–5
11	Ivory Coast	2–4
12	Madagascar	0–6

== Awards ==
2003 FIBA Africa Championship winners

Angola
Seventh title

Most Valuable Player
(Angola) Miguel Lutonda

== See also ==
- 2002 FIBA Africa Clubs Champions Cup
