= FIBA Africa Championship 1968 =

FIBA AfroBasket 1968
4th FIBA Africa Basketball Championship

Tournament details
- Host country: Morocco
- Dates: 29 March – 6 April
- Teams: 9
- Venue(s): 1 (in 1 host city)

Final positions
- Champions: Senegal (1st title)

The FIBA Africa Championship 1968, was the fourth FIBA Africa Championship regional basketball championship held by FIBA Africa, which also served as Africa qualifier for the 1968 Summer Olympics, granting berths to the champion and runner-up. It was held in Morocco between 29 March and 6 April 1968. Nine national teams entered the event under the auspices of FIBA Africa, the sport's regional governing body. The city of Casablanca hosted the tournament. Senegal won their first title after defeating hosts Morocco in the final.

== Format ==
- Teams were split into two round-robin groups of five and four teams. The top two teams from each group advanced to the knockout semi-finals. The winners in the semi-finals competed for the championship and were granted berths to the 1968 Summer Olympics, while the losing teams from the semifinals competed for third place in an extra game.
- The third and fourth teams from each group were cross-paired and competed in a separate bracket to define places fifth through eighth in the final standings. The bottom team in the five-team group occupied ninth place in the final standings.

== First round ==
Advanced to the semi-finals

=== Group A ===
Team	Pld	W	L	PF	PA	PD	Pts
Morocco	4	4	0	321	242	+79	8
Mali	4	3	1	295	273	+22	7
Ivory Coast	4	2	2	274	275	−1	6
Sudan	4	1	3	234	274	−40	5
Congo	4	0	4	234	294	−60	4

Sudan	50–43	Congo
Scoring by half: 23–18, 27–25

Morocco	66–59	Ivory Coast
Scoring by half: 41–27, 25–32

Mali	71–62	Sudan
Scoring by half: 30–25, 41–37

Morocco	83–54	Congo
Scoring by half: 43–14, 40–40

Ivory Coast	86–67	Congo
Scoring by half: 41–25, 45–42

Morocco	79–68	Mali
Scoring by half: 31–34, 48–34

Morocco	93–61	Sudan
Scoring by half: 38–30, 55–31

Mali	81–62	Ivory Coast
Scoring by half: 35–30, 46–32

Mali	75–70	Congo
Scoring by half: 37–37, 38–33

Ivory Coast	67–61	Sudan
Scoring by half: 27–38, 40–23

=== Group B ===
Team	Pld	W	L	PF	PA	PD	Pts
Senegal	3	2	1	218	167	+51	5
Central African Republic	3	2	1	230	208	+22	5
Algeria	3	2	1	215	215	0	5
Niger	3	0	3	186	259	−73	3

Central African Republic	94–68	Niger
Scoring by half: 41–22, 53–46

Algeria	67–61	Senegal
Scoring by half: 33–31, 34–30

Senegal	83–47	Niger
Scoring by half: 37–17, 46–30

Central African Republic	83–66	Algeria
Scoring by half: 36–34, 47–32

Algeria	82–71	Niger
Scoring by half: 32–34, 50–37

Senegal	74–53	Central African Republic
Scoring by half: 36–19, 38–34

== Knockout stage ==
=== Championship bracket ===
Semi-finals
April 5
Morocco	67
Central African Republic	58
April 5
Senegal	62
Mali	54

Final
April 6
Morocco	60
Senegal	67
Third place
April 6
Central African Republic	76
Mali	60

=== Semifinals ===
Senegal	62–54	Mali
Scoring by half: 17–25, 45–29

Morocco	67–58	Central African Republic
Scoring by half: 27–22, 40–36

=== Third place ===
Central African Republic	76–60	Mali
Scoring by half: 35–22, 41–38

=== Final ===
Senegal	67–60	Morocco
Scoring by half: 33–26, 34–34

== Classification stage ==
Classification round
April 5
Sudan	73
Algeria	70
April 5
Niger	73
Ivory Coast	62

Fifth place
April 6
Sudan	2
Niger	0
Seventh place
April 6
Algeria	64
Ivory Coast	65

Niger	73–62	Ivory Coast
Scoring by half: 31–30, 42–32

Sudan	73–70	Algeria
Scoring by half: 37–31, 36–39

Algeria	64–65	Ivory Coast
Scoring by half: 32–27, 32–38

Sudan	2–0	Niger

== Final standings ==
Qualified for the 1968 Summer Olympics

Rank	Team	Record
1st place, gold medalist(s)	Senegal	4–1
2nd place, silver medalist(s)	Morocco	5–1
3rd place, bronze medalist(s)	Central African Republic	3–2
4	Mali	3–3
5	Sudan	3–3
6	Niger	1–4
7	Ivory Coast	4–3
8	Algeria	2–3
9	Congo	0–4
