= COSPN =

Malagasy basketball club

- Nickname: Les Policiers (The Policemen)
- Leagues: N1A
- Arena: Palais des Sports Mahamasina
- Capacity: 7,090
- Location: Antananarivo, Analamanga
- Head coach: Jean de Dieu Randrianarivelo
- 2022 position: N1A, 1st of 12
- Championships: 4 (2018, 2021, 2022, 2025)

Club Omnisport de La Police Nationale, commonly known as COSPN or COSPN Analamanga, is a Malagasy basketball club based in Antananarivo, Analamanga. The team plays in the N1A, the top tier level in Madagascar. COSPN is affiliated to the national police force and has won the league four times, in 2018, 2021, 2022 and 2025.

In December 2018, COSPN qualified for the 2018–19 Africa Basketball League after defeating Premium Cobras from the Seychelles in the Zone 7 qualification. It was the COSPN's debut at Africa's highest continental level.

== Honours ==
- N1A

Winners (4): 2018, 2021, 2022, 2025
Runners-up (2): 2016, 2019

- President's Cup
  - Winners (1): 2022
- FIBA Africa Zone 7 Championship
  - Champions (1): 2017

== In African competitions ==
FIBA Africa Basketball League (1 appearances)

2018–19 – Group Stage

Road to BAL (1 appearance)

2023 – Elite 16

== Players ==
=== Current roster ===
Note: Flags indicate national team eligibility at FIBA-sanctioned events. Players may hold other non-FIBA nationalities not displayed.

COSPN roster
Players
Coaches

Pos.	No.	Nat.	Name	Ht.	Age
F	1	(Madagascar)	Randriamampionona, Elly	1.88 m (6 ft 2 in)	29 – 20 July 1997
SG	2	(Madagascar)	Rahajaniaina, Orlando	1.86 m (6 ft 1 in)	29 – 18 June 1997
	3	(Nigeria)	Adewunmi, Samuel		27 – 18 January 1999
G	6	(Madagascar)	Ratianarivo, Livio	1.86 m (6 ft 1 in)	30 – 24 April 1996
C	12	(Madagascar)	Solondrainy, Alpha	1.98 m (6 ft 6 in)	27 – 4 May 1999
C	14	(Madagascar)	Rakoto, Sylvestre	1.93 m (6 ft 4 in)	33 – 5 February 1993
C	15	(Madagascar)	Rasolomanana, Anthony	1.98 m (6 ft 6 in)	29 – 2 May 1997
SG	23	(Madagascar)	Solonomeniavo, Riza	1.93 m (6 ft 4 in)	32 – 6 April 1994
SG	30	(Madagascar)	Rakotovao, Marco	1.86 m (6 ft 1 in)	25 – 20 May 2001
PG	32	(Madagascar)	Tsarafeno, Edito	1.73 m (5 ft 8 in)	24 – 9 November 2001
PF	50	(United States)	Coulter, Bishop	1.96 m (6 ft 5 in)	29 – 24 January 1997
C	99	(Nigeria)	Umeadi, Emmanuel	2.09 m (6 ft 10 in)	30 – 30 August 1996

Head coach

- (Madagascar) Jean De Dieu Randrianarivelo

Assistant coach(es)

- (Madagascar) Jacques Andriamihaja
- (Madagascar) Richardin Ratsitokana

Legend

- (C) Team captain
- (I) Import player
- Injured

- Roster
Updated: 26 November 2023
