= ASCUT =

- Leagues: N1A
- Founded: 2004
- Location: Toamasina, Madagascar
- Team colors: Red, black and white
- President: Narison Rafidimanana (president in honor)
- Head coach: Pierre Rabearison
- Championships: 6 Malagasy Leagues

Association Sportive de la Commune Urbaine de Toamasina, commonly known as ASCUT, is a Malagasy basketball team from Toamasina. The team plays in the N1A, the highest national level and has won the national championship 6 times.

== History ==
The club was established in 2004 by Narson Rafidimanana, at the time the vice-president of the urban community of Toamasina. One year after the club's creation it won the national second division N1B. In 2006, ASCUT entered the N1A, the country's highest level, for the first time.

The team won its first national championship in 2008 and later had a fourpeat with consecutive championships from 2011 to 2014.

In 2021, ASCUT won its sixth Malagasy N1A title after defeating GNBC in the final. Pierre Rabearison was the team's head coach.

The team was originally scheduled to play in the 2022 BAL Qualifying Tournaments but withdrew.

== Honours ==
- N1A

Champions (6): 2008, 2011, 2012, 2013, 2014, 2020–21

- N1B

Champions (1): 2005

- President's Cup
  - Winners (1): 2015
- Indian Ocean Champions Cup

Champions (2): 2009, 2013
