= Mahajanga =

City and district in Boeny, Madagascar

Mahajanga Majunga
- District and city
- Majunga
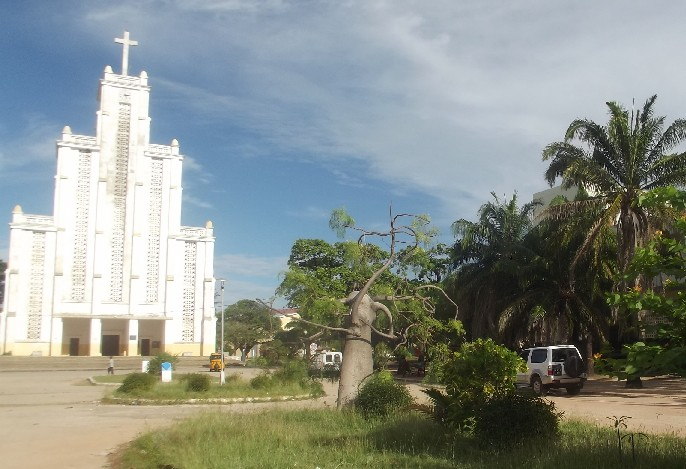
- Mahajanga Cathedral

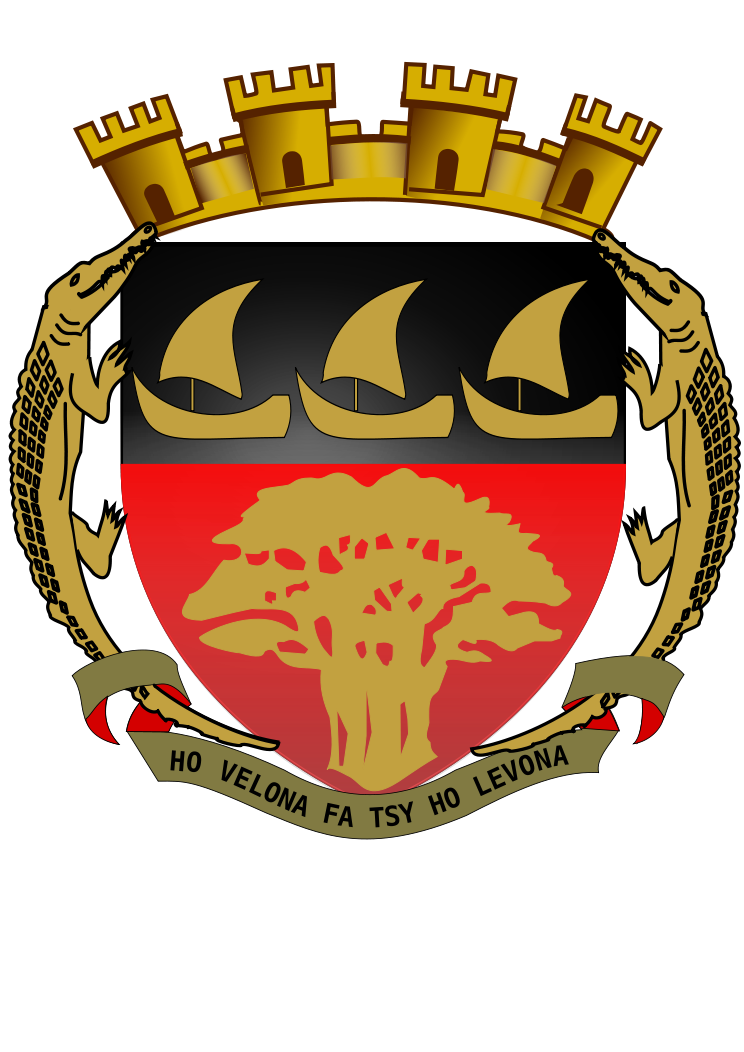
- Coat of arms

- Location in Madagascar
- Coordinates: 15°43′S 46°19′E
- Country: Madagascar
- Region: Boeny
- District: Mahajanga District
- Commune: Mahajanga

Government
  - Chef de Region de Majunga: Adakalo Nasolo

Area
  - Total: 51.05 km^{2} (19.71 sq mi)

Population (2018 census)
  - Total: 246,022
  - Density: 4,819/km^{2} (12,480/sq mi)
- Climate: Aw

Mahajangā ([maːˈdzaŋɡə̥]; French: Majunga) is a city and an administrative district on the northwest coast of Madagascar. The city of Mahajanga (Mahajanga I) is the capital of the Boeny Region. The district (identical to the city) had a population of 258,068 in 2020.

== City ==
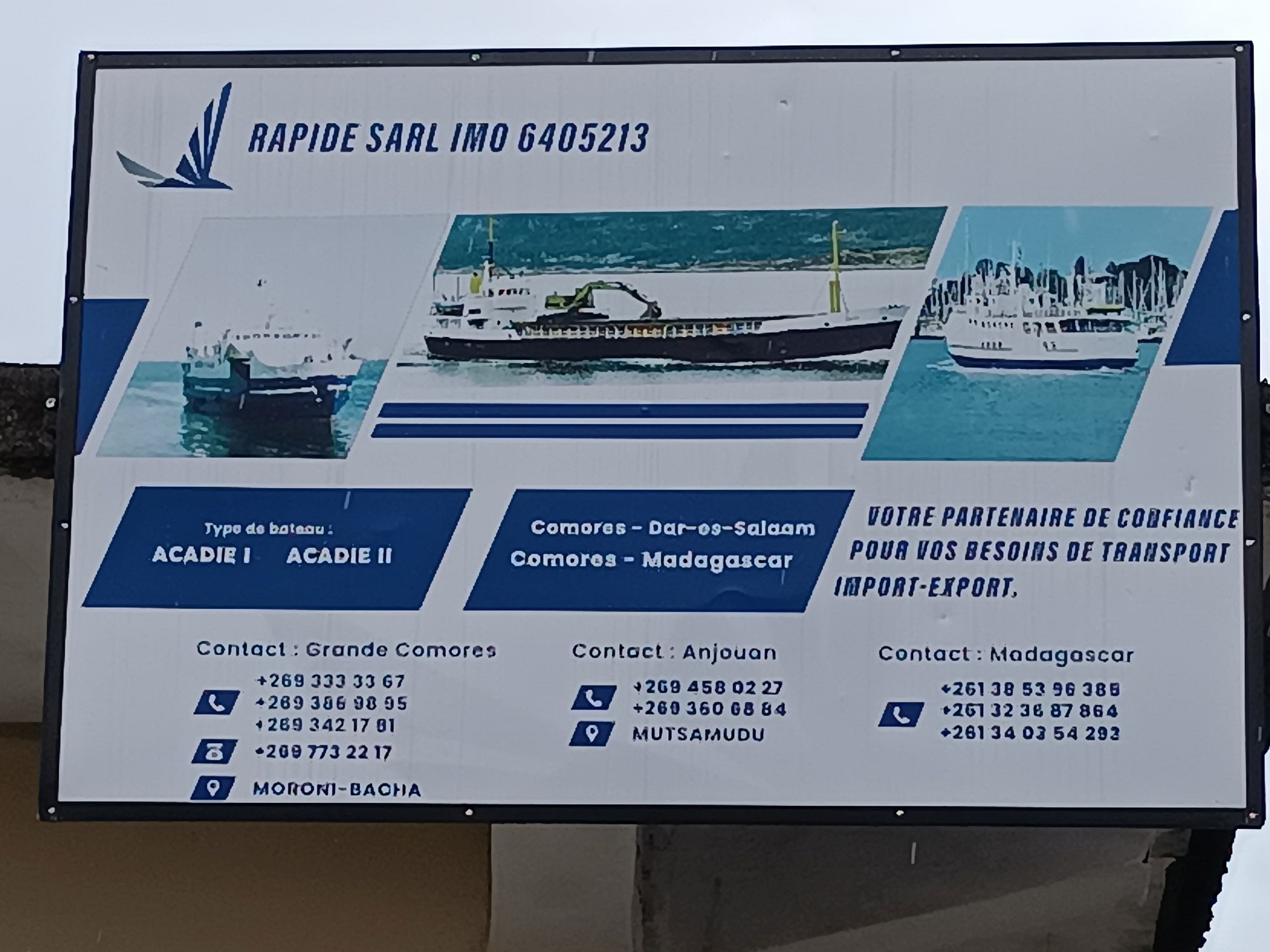
Acadie

Mahajanga is a seaport, the second most important one in Madagascar after Toamasina. The marine terminal accommodates containerships and small (150 gross ton) general cargo freighters. Because of the limited water depth at the wharf, only small ships can call at the terminal. Deeper-draft ships anchor off the terminal and transfer cargo to and from barges, which move it to and from the terminal.

Severe storms during December 2006 damaged the bulkhead, allowing water to flow in and wash backfill out from under the terminal's paving blocks. The resulting collapse of pavement blocks has made operations at the terminal less efficient and reduced the storage space available. The largest and most valuable containerized export is frozen shrimp.

There is an international airport with regional flights to Mayotte, vessels of Acadie are connecting the town with Mutsamudu and Moroni.

Mahajanga is on the Betsiboka River, which then leads to Bombetoka Bay.

The city has a sizable Muslim population. In 1977, it was the scene of ethnic unrest, forcing the evacuation of the Comorian minority living there. Mahajanga is also the seat of a Roman Catholic Diocese (Cathedral of the Holy Heart of Mary).

=== Baobab ===
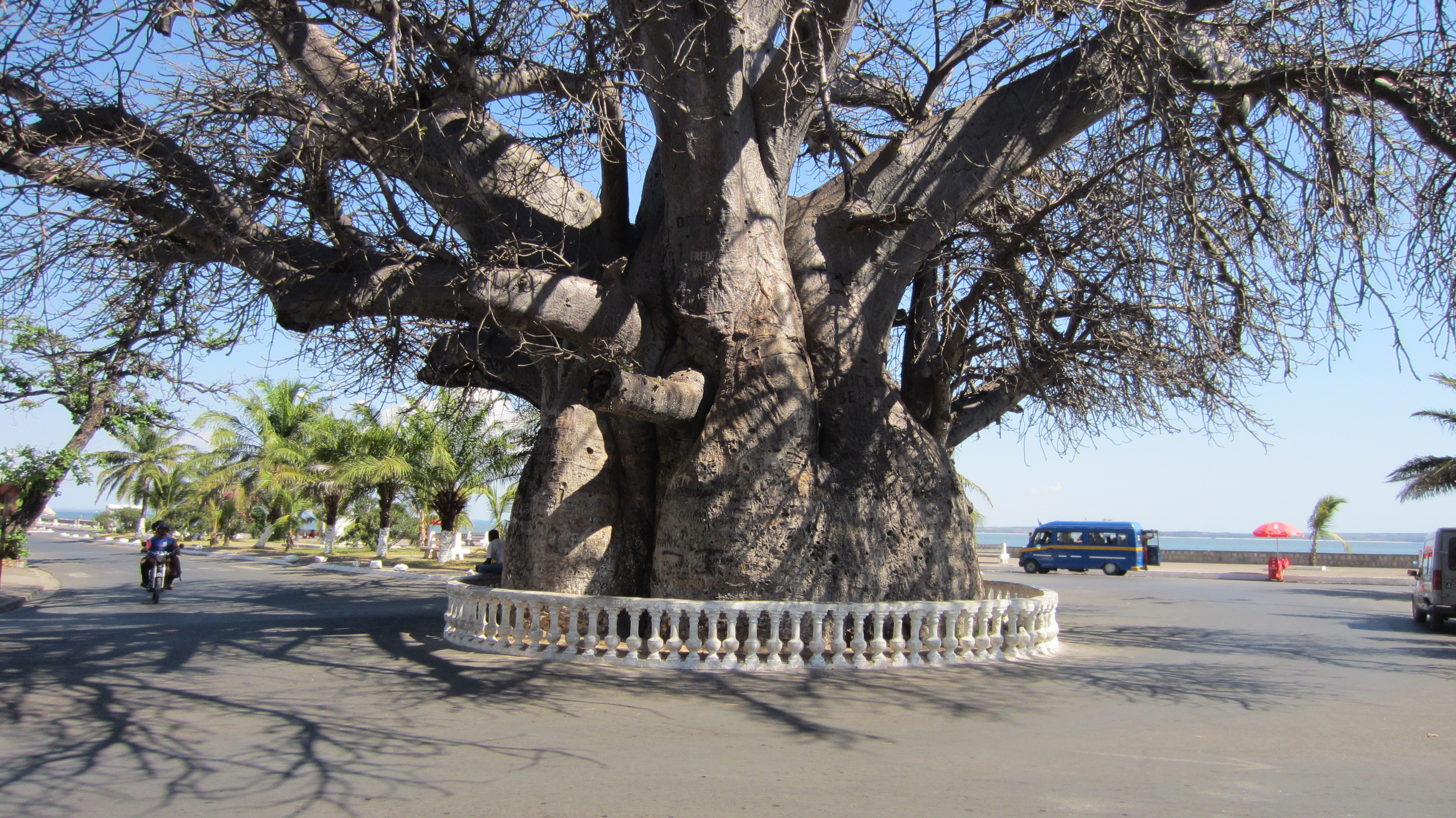
The baobab in Mahajanga

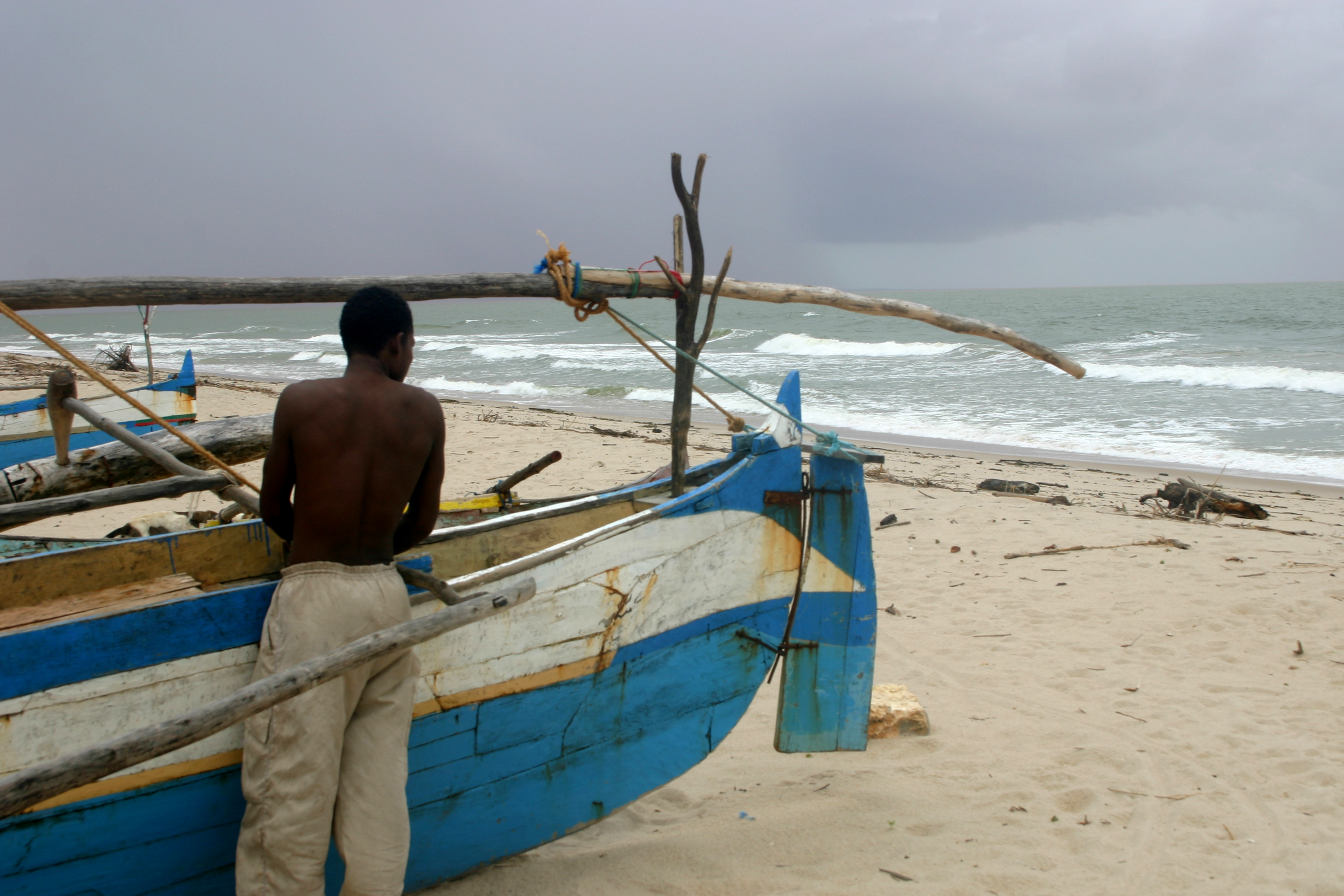
One of the beaches north of the city

The African baobab tree near the coast is the largest specimen in Madagascar, having a circumference of 21 metres (69 ft), and is the symbol of the city. Its age is unknown, but it is usually said to be 700–800 years old. It was once used as a site of important meetings, and, in the 19th century, as a site for executions. It is said that to honor the Malagasy ancestors, anyone who visits it must walk around it seven times.

== History ==
According to Jane Hooper, "Since the tenth century, ports in the north of Madagascar, home to an Islamized population, had attracted merchants and migrants from East Africa, the Middle East, and even the Far East. At least a dozen ports were identified in northern Madagascar by the late fifteenth century by the Arab geographer Ibn Mājid...By the early eighteenth century, Andriamandisoarivo, with the support of his eight-hundred-man army, founded a new Sakalava dynasty in the north which he named Volamena, meaning red money or gold. His descendants were known as the Zafibolamena, children of the Volamena. He died in the northern city of Bezavo around 1710, having cemented his name in traditions as the founder of a powerful new kingdom. His kingdom contained the port of Mazalagem Nova, or Massaliege, already a prosperous center for trade, as well as the new ports of Boina and Mahajanga (Majunga)...One English captain described the northwestern town of Mahajanga as a bustling, cosmopolitan port in 1764. He wrote that the town, built "after the Indian fashion," contained many stone buildings and mosques. Inhabited by "native" Muslims and others from "Surate, Johana, Mosembeck, and the Commoro islands," Mahajanga was clearly a prosperous and cosmopolitan port. Within the city, the Sakalava rulers allowed Muslims to practice their religion freely. In return, the Sakalava instituted a series of trading controls. The king appointed a "purser authorized to carry trade on in the king's name, in conjunction with another purser that comes down from the king." Sakalava kings and queens even allowed visiting European merchants to trade with local Muslim merchants as well as with Sakalava representatives and appeared to be increasingly tapped into these networks crossing the southwestern Indian Ocean region. A Sakalava queen married an East African (or Comorian) man around the middle of the eighteenth century, according to English and Dutch reports. Sakalava kings and queens also incorporated Islamic beliefs and rituals into their practice of divine kingship and some converted to Islam by the early nineteenth century."

=== Indian community ===
Picture from street in Mahajanga with Indian wagons. October 1912. Photo by Walter Kaudern.

In the 1780s, a community of roughly 200 Muslim traders from the Indian subcontinent had formed at Mahajanga at the mouth of the Betsiboka River, according to French traveler Dumaine. Thus, the etymology of the word "Mahajanga" may be Indic. Confusion arose over their legal status; they often declared themselves to be Malagasy subjects to evade the laws against slave-holding or the building of stone houses, both forbidden to British subjects. Their dhows, which they used to transport goods to and from the African mainland, flew French flags. Initial arrivals were mainly Muslim Khojas, Ismailis and Da'udi Bohras, with some Hindus settling later.

The 1911 census found 4,480 Indians in the country, making them 21% of the total foreign population and the second-largest foreign population, after the French. Following the nationalisation of private businesses in the 1970s, many of them were compelled to leave; those who remained were largely uneducated, but stayed on and gradually built their businesses. By 2000, they were generally believed to control 50-60% of the country's economy, making them the target of demonstrators during periods of unrest.

In December 2006, a cyclone hit Mahajanga, causing significant damage to the port facilities and to some buildings on or near the coast.

=== Military history ===
The city has an airfield which the British used to station Shackleton aircraft to support the Beira Patrol from May 1966.

== Region ==
Mahajanga is the capital city of the Boeny Region.

== Notable people ==
Ali Soilih (1937 – 1978) a Comorian socialist revolutionary and political figure who served as the Dictator of the State of the Comoros from 3 January 1976 to 13 May 1978.

== Sports ==
- Fosa Juniors FC is the local football club.
- ASCB Boeny (basketball) - Malagasy champions 2017

The stadium Jacques Rabemananjara, with its 8,000 places, is the 5th largest in the country.

== Climate ==
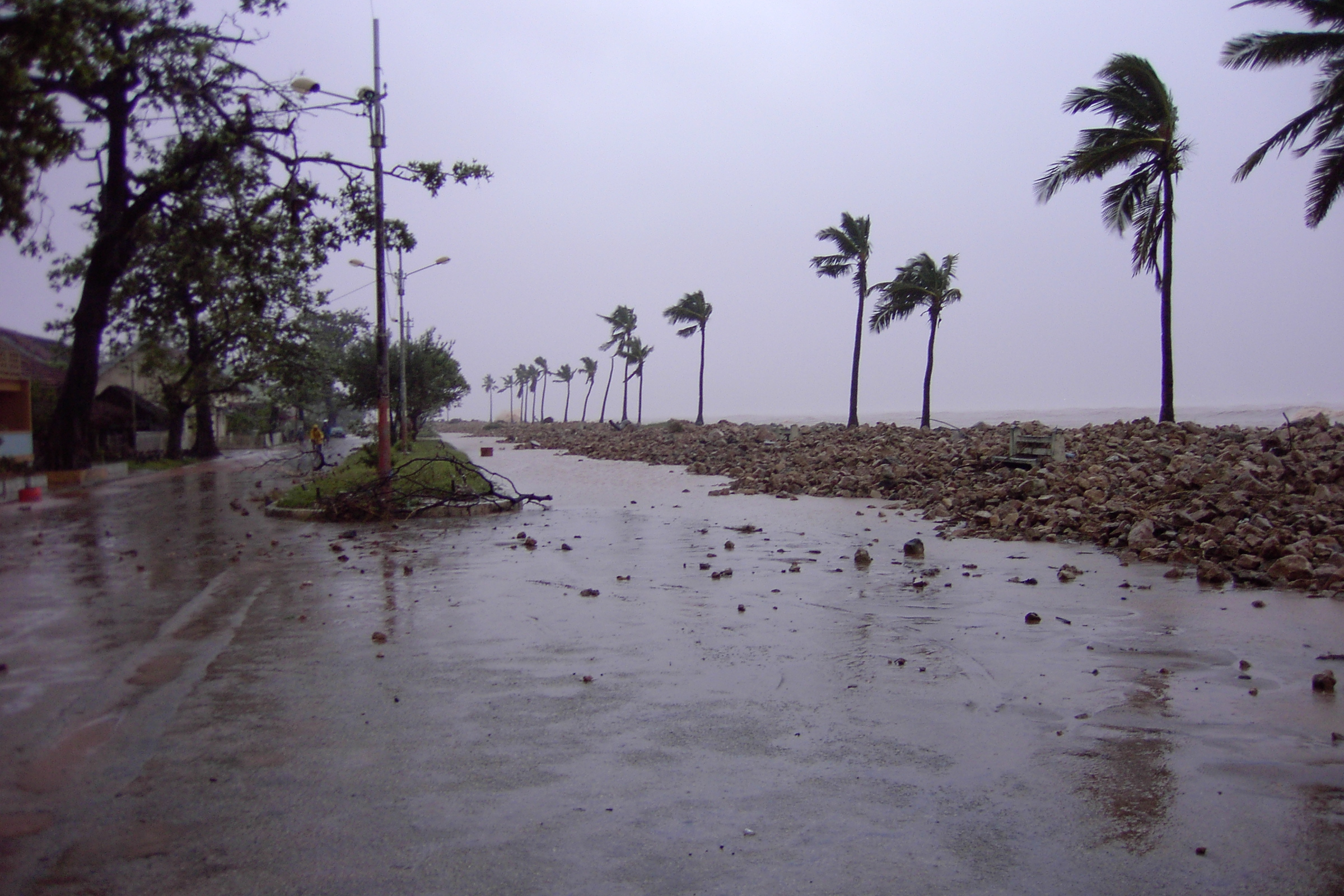
The coast promenade after the cyclone Gafilo in 2004

Mahajanga has a tropical savanna climate (Köppen Aw) with two distinct seasons: a humid, rainy wet season from November to mid-April, and a sunny, less humid and practically bone-dry dry season for the remaining six-and-a-half months. Cyclones can occur during the wet season, producing very heavy rain and extensive erosion.

Climate data for Mahajanga (1991–2020)
Month	Jan	Feb	Mar	Apr	May	Jun	Jul	Aug	Sep	Oct	Nov	Dec	Year
Record high °C (°F)	36.4 (97.5)	35.2 (95.4)	37.0 (98.6)	38.1 (100.6)	36.2 (97.2)	35.0 (95.0)	34.0 (93.2)	35.3 (95.5)	37.0 (98.6)	39.2 (102.6)	38.0 (100.4)	38.0 (100.4)	39.2 (102.6)
Mean daily maximum °C (°F)	31.4 (88.5)	31.5 (88.7)	32.6 (90.7)	33.3 (91.9)	32.7 (90.9)	31.6 (88.9)	31.2 (88.2)	31.9 (89.4)	32.7 (90.9)	33.3 (91.9)	33.2 (91.8)	32.3 (90.1)	32.3 (90.2)
Daily mean °C (°F)	27.9 (82.2)	27.9 (82.2)	28.4 (83.1)	28.4 (83.1)	27.1 (80.8)	25.5 (77.9)	25.0 (77.0)	25.5 (77.9)	26.6 (79.9)	27.9 (82.2)	28.7 (83.7)	28.4 (83.1)	27.3 (81.1)
Mean daily minimum °C (°F)	24.3 (75.7)	24.3 (75.7)	24.3 (75.7)	23.5 (74.3)	21.6 (70.9)	19.5 (67.1)	18.7 (65.7)	19.2 (66.6)	20.5 (68.9)	22.5 (72.5)	24.1 (75.4)	24.5 (76.1)	22.2 (72.0)
Record low °C (°F)	19.6 (67.3)	20.0 (68.0)	20.3 (68.5)	19.3 (66.7)	16.3 (61.3)	15.2 (59.4)	12.6 (54.7)	14.0 (57.2)	15.7 (60.3)	16.4 (61.5)	19.7 (67.5)	19.5 (67.1)	12.6 (54.7)
Average precipitation mm (inches)	485.8 (19.13)	328.7 (12.94)	186.8 (7.35)	48.8 (1.92)	4.1 (0.16)	1.1 (0.04)	1.0 (0.04)	2.1 (0.08)	2.0 (0.08)	15.5 (0.61)	101.9 (4.01)	198.1 (7.80)	1,375.7 (54.16)
Average precipitation days (≥ 1.0 mm)	18.4	15.7	10.5	3.1	0.5	0.2	0.2	0.2	0.3	1.8	5.2	11.8	67.9
Average relative humidity (%)	82	83	81	73	67	64	62	60	63	66	72	80	71
Mean monthly sunshine hours	209.0	184.9	244.8	269.9	294.9	282.9	291.5	303.1	307.0	319.7	288.2	227.3	3,223.2
Source 1: NOAA (sun, 1961-1990)
Source 2: Weltwetter Spiegel Online (humidity)

== Education ==
The University of Mahajanga is located in Ambondrona campus.

French schools:

- Collège français Françoise-Dolto

== Literature ==
- R. J. Barendse, Arabian Seas 1700-1763: The Western Indian Ocean in the eighteenth century
- Du Maine, Idée de la côte orientale de Madagascar, Paris, 1792.
