= 2022–23 Championnat Pro A =

- Association: Tunisian Basketball Federation
- League: Championnat Pro A
- Number of teams: 10

Season
- Season MVP: Radhouane Slimane (US Monastir); Naim Dhifallah (Club Africain)
- Relegated to Nationale 1: US Ansar; Stade Nabeulien

Super Play-offs
- Finals champions: US Monastir (8th title)
- Runners-up: Club Africain
- Finals MVP: Oussama Marnaoui (US Monastir)

Seasons
- ← 2021-22 2023–24 →

The 2022–23 Championnat Pro A is the 68th season of the Championnat Pro A, the highest level league of Tunisia professional basketball.

US Monastir won its 8th national title, including its fifth consecutive title. As champions, they qualified directly for the 2024 BAL season.

== Teams ==
Étoile Sportive du Sahel was promoted from the Nationale 1.

== Regular season ==
Pos	Team	Pld	W	L	GF	GA	GD	Pts	Qualification
1	Club Africain	18	16	2	1303	1083	+220	34	Advance to Playoffs
2	US Monastir	18	14	4	1302	1103	+199	32	Advance to Playoffs
3	Ezzahra Sports	18	11	7	1225	1150	+75	29	Advance to Playoffs
4	Étoile du Sahel	18	11	7	1109	1140	−31	29	Advance to Playoffs
5	DS Grombalia	18	10	8	1259	1211	+48	28	Advance to Playoffs
6	ES Radès	18	10	8	1250	1203	+47	28	Advance to Playoffs
7	Stade Nabeulien	18	10	8	1274	1271	+3	28	Relegated to Relegation Round
8	JS Kairouan	18	4	14	1180	1347	−167	22	Relegated to Relegation Round
9	JS Menazah	18	2	16	1191	1333	−142	20	Relegated to Relegation Round
10	US Ansar	18	2	16	1091	1343	−252	20	Relegated to Relegation Round

Source: Azscore

== Play-off ==
Pos	Team	Pld	W	L	GF	GA	GD	Pts	Qualification
1	Monastir	10	9	1	739	630	+109	19	Advance to Super Play-off
2	Club Africain	10	7	3	730	617	+113	17	Advance to Super Play-off
3	Ezzahra	10	4	6	639	657	−18	14	Advance to Super Play-off
4	ES Radès	10	4	6	696	738	−42	14	Advance to Super Play-off
5	Étoile Sahel	10	4	6	644	713	−69	14	Advance to Play-out
6	Grombalia	10	2	8	614	707	−93	12	Advance to Play-out

Source: pAzscore

== Relegation round ==
Pos	Team	Pld	W	L	GF	GA	GD	Pts	Qualification
1	JS Kairouan	6	4	2	406	412	−6	10	Advance to Play-out
2	Stade Nabeulien	6	3	3	383	380	+3	9	Advance to Play-out
3	JS Menezah	6	3	3	421	407	+14	9	Advance to Play-out
4	Ansar (R)	6	2	4	389	400	−11	8	Relegated to Nationale 1

Source: Azscore
(R) Relegated

== Play-out ==
Pos	Team	Pld	W	L	GF	GA	GD	Pts	Qualification
1	JS Menezah	10	6	4	746	701	+45	16	
2	Ezzahra	10	6	4	706	707	−1	16	
3	JS Kairouan	10	5	5	709	678	+31	15	
4	Grombalia	10	5	5	688	698	−10	15	
5	BC Mahdia	10	4	6	698	717	−19	14	
6	Stade Nabeulien (R)	10	4	6	603	649	−46	14	Relegated to Nationale 1

Source: Azscore
(R) Relegated

== Super Play-offs ==
The Super Play-offs began on 10 April 2023 and ended on 26 May 2023.

Semifinals
1	US Monastir	66	103	76	3
4	Étoile du Sahel	58	90	73	0
2	Club Africain	74	80	79	105	3
3	ES Radès	61	66	80	99	1

Finals
1	US Monastir	92	78	68	79	3
2	Club Africain	89	72	72	76	1

== Individual awards ==
Récompense	Joueur	Club
Co-MVP	Radhouane Slimane	US Monastir
Co-MVP	Naim Dhifallah	Club Africain
Meilleur joueur de la finale	Oussama Marnaoui	US Monastir
All-Championnat Pro A Team	Mahdi Sayeh	Club Africain
All-Championnat Pro A Team	Oussama Marnaoui	US Monastir
All-Championnat Pro A Team	Lassaad Chouaya	US Monastir
All-Championnat Pro A Team	Radhouane Slimane	US Monastir
All-Championnat Pro A Team	Naim Dhifallah	Club Africain
