= 2023–24 Championnat Pro A =

- Association: Tunisian Basketball Federation
- League: Championnat Pro A
- Teams: 10

Season

Super Play-offs
- Finals champions: US Monastir (9th title)
- Runners-up: Club Africain
- Finals MVP: Oussama Marnaoui

Seasons
- ← 2022-23 2024–25 →

The 2023–24 Championnat Pro A was the 69th season of the Championnat Pro A, the highest level league of Tunisia professional basketball organised by the Tunisia Basketball Federation (TBBF). US Monastir won its 9th national title, including its sixth consecutive title. As champions, they qualified directly for the 2025 BAL season.

== First phase ==
Pos	Team	Pld	W	L	Pts	Qualification or relegation
1	US Monastir	18	18	0	36	Advance to playoffs
2	Club Africain	18	16	2	34	Advance to playoffs
3	ES Sahel	18	11	7	29	Advance to playoffs
4	JS Kairouan	18	10	8	28	Advance to playoffs
5	ES Radès	18	9	9	27	Advance to playoffs
6	La Goulette Kram	18	9	9	27	Advance to playoffs
7	Stade Nabeulien	18	6	12	24	Qualification for play-down
8	JS Menazah	18	6	12	24	Qualification for play-down
9	DS Grombalia	18	4	14	22	Qualification for play-down
10	Ezzahra Sports	18	1	17	19	Qualification for play-down

Source: Afrobasket

== Playoffs ==
Pos	Team	Pld	W	L	Pts	Qualification or relegation
1	US Monastir	10	9	1	19	Advance to Super Playoffs
2	Club Africain	10	9	1	19	Advance to Super Playoffs
3	JS Kairouan	10	4	6	14	Advance to Super Playoffs
4	ES Radès	10	4	6	14	Advance to Super Playoffs
5	ES Sahel	9	2	7	11	
6	La Goulette Kram	10	1	9	11	

Source: Afrobasket

== Super Playoffs ==
Semifinals
1	US Monastir	66	83	58
4	ES Radès	61	70	50
2	Club Africain	71	81	63
3	JS Kairouan	60	46	57

Finals
1	US Monastir	82	83	58	56	78
2	Club Africain	72	72	81	69	58
Third place
3	JS Kairouan	144
4	ES Radès	74

== Play-out ==
Pos	Team	Pld	W	L	Pts	Qualification or relegation
1	JS Menazah	1	1	0	2	
2	Stade Nabeulien	1	1	0	2	
3	Ezzahra Sports	1	0	1	1	
4	DS Grombalia (R)	1	0	1	1	Relegated

Source: Afrobasket
(R) Relegated

== Individual awards ==
Best Team by Position	Omar Abada	Club africain
Best Team by Position	Achref Gannouni	US Monastir
Best Team by Position	Oussama Marnaoui	US Monastir
Best Team by Position	Firas Lahyani	US Monastir
Best Team by Position	Fares Ochi	Club africain
Finals MVP	Oussama Marnaoui	US Monastir
