= 2019–20 Championnat Pro A =

Basketball season in Tunisia

2019–20 Championnat National A
- Season: 2019–20
- Dates: 28 September 2019 – 8 August 2020
- Teams: 12

Finals
- Champions: US Monastir; 5th title
- Runners-up: ES Radès

The 2019–20 Championnat National A is the 65th season of the Championnat National A, the highest basketball league in Tunisia. The season started 28 September 2019 and ended 8 August 2020. The winners will qualify for the 2021 BAL season.

On 14 March 2020 the season was postponed due to the COVID-19 pandemic. On 9 May, it was announced the league was to resume behind closed doors on 15 July.

Eventually, US Monastir won its second-straight title.

== Teams ==
This season, 12 teams played in the league. CA Bizertin and Stade Gabèsien were promoted from the Nationale B.

Club	City	Arena	Capacity
CA Bizertin	Bizerte	Salle Fatnassi Bizerte	2,000
Club Africain	Tunis	Salle Chérif-Bellaminej	2,500
Dalia Sport Grombalia	Grombalia	Salle Couverte de Grombalia	1,400
ES La Goulette	La Goulette	Salle couverte de La Goulette-Le Kram	1,800
ES Radès	Radès	Salle Couverte Taoufik-Bouhima	3,500
ES Sahel	Sahel	Sousse Indoor Sports Hall	5,000
Hammamet	Hammamet	Salle d'Hammamet	2,500
JS Kairouan	Kairouan	Salle Kairouan	2,000
JS Menzah	Tunis (El Menzah)	Palais des sports d'El Menzah	4,500
Stade Gabèsien	Gabès	Salle omnisports de Gabès	1,800
Stade Nabeulien	Nabeul	Salle Bir Challouf	5,000
US Monastir	Monastir	Mohamed-Mzali Sports Hall	4,075

== First stage ==
=== Group A ===
Pos	Team	Pld	W	L	Qualification or relegation
1	US Monastir	9	9	0	Qualification to Super 6
2	ES Sahel	9	6	3	Qualification to Super 6
3	Club Africain	9	6	3	Qualification to Super 6
4	ES La Goulette	9	4	5	
5	Stade Nabeulien	9	2	7	
6	Stade Gabèsien	9	0	9	Play-out

Source: FTBB

=== Group B ===
Pos	Team	Pld	W	L	Qualification or relegation
1	ES Radès	10	9	1	Qualification to Super 6
2	JS Kairouan	10	7	3	Qualification to Super 6
3	Dalia Sport Grombalia	10	7	3	Qualification to Super 6
4	AS Hammamet	10	4	6	
5	JS Manazeh	10	3	7	
6	CA Bizertin	10	0	10	Play-out

Source: FTBB

== Super 6 ==
Pos	Grp	Team	Pld	W	L	Pts	Qualification or relegation
1	A	US Monastir	10	9	1	19	Qualification to Playoffs
2	B	ES Radès	10	6	4	16	Qualification to Playoffs
3	B	Dalia Sport Grombalia	10	6	4	16	Qualification to Playoffs
4	B	JS Kairouan	10	4	6	14	Qualification to Playoffs
5	A	Club Africain	10	4	6	14	
6	A	ES Sahel	10	1	9	11	

Source: Afrobasket.com

== Playoffs ==
=== Bracket ===
Semifinals
1	US Monastir	2
4	JS Kairouan	0
2	ES Radès	2
3	Dalia Sport Grombalia	1

Finals
1	US Monastir	2
2	ES Radès	0

=== Semifinals ===
Team 1	Series	Team 2	Game 1	Game 2	Game 3
US Monastir	2–0	JS Kairouan	72–64	71–65	
ES Radès	2–1	Dalia Sport Grombalia	82–80	68–88	75–71

=== Finals ===
Team 1	Series	Team 2	Game 1	Game 2	Game 3
US Monastir	2–0	ES Radès	89–69	82–77	
