= 2020 FIBA Men's Olympic Qualifying Tournaments squads =

The 2020 FIBA Men's Olympic Qualifying Tournaments includes teams whose rosters consists of 12 players; a team may opt to have one naturalized player as per FIBA eligibility rules in their roster.

Player ages are as of 29 June 2021, the first day of the tournament.

== OQT Victoria, Canada ==
=== Canada ===
Canada National Basketball Team roster
Players
Coaches

Pos.	No.	Name	Age – Date of birth	Height	Club	Ctr.
G	4	Nickeil Alexander-Walker	22 – September 2, 1998	6 ft 6 in (1.98 m)	New Orleans Pelicans	(United States)
G/F	9	RJ Barrett	21 – June 14, 2000	6 ft 7 in (2.01 m)	New York Knicks	(United States)
G	2	Trae Bell-Haynes	25 – September 5, 1995	6 ft 2 in (1.88 m)	Crailsheim Merlins	(Germany)
F	10	Anthony Bennett	28 – March 13, 1993	6 ft 8 in (2.03 m)	Cangrejeros de Santurce	(Puerto Rico)
F	11	Aaron Doornekamp	35 – December 5, 1985	6 ft 7 in (2.01 m)	CB 1939 Canarias	(Spain)
G	1	Luguentz Dort	22 – April 19, 1999	6 ft 4 in (1.93 m)	Oklahoma City Thunder	(United States)
G	6	Cory Joseph	29 – August 20, 1991	6 ft 3 in (1.91 m)	Detroit Pistons	(United States)
F/C	8	Trey Lyles	25 – November 5, 1995	6 ft 10 in (2.08 m)	San Antonio Spurs	(United States)
G	23	Mychal Mulder	27 – June 12, 1994	6 ft 4 in (1.93 m)	Golden State Warriors	(United States)
F/C	44	Andrew Nicholson	31 – December 8, 1989	6 ft 9 in (2.06 m)	Fujian Sturgeons	(China)
F/C	7	Dwight Powell	29 – July 20, 1991	6 ft 11 in (2.11 m)	Dallas Mavericks	(United States)
F	22	Andrew Wiggins	26 – February 23, 1995	6 ft 7 in (2.01 m)	Golden State Warriors	(United States)

Head coach

- (United States) Nick Nurse

Assistant coach(es)

- (Canada) Jon Goodwillie
- (Canada) Gord Herbert
- (Canada) John Corbacio
- (Canada) Michael Meeks
- (United States) Nate Bjorkgren
- (Canada) Nate Mitchell

Legend

- (C) Team captain
- (NP) Naturalized player
- Club – describes last
  club before the tournament
- Age – describes age
  on 29 June 2021

=== Greece ===
Roster.

Greece national basketball team roster
Players
Coaches

Pos.	No.	Name	Age – Date of birth	Height	Club	Ctr.
F/C	37	Kostas Antetokounmpo	23 – 20 November 1997	2.08 m (6 ft 10 in)	Los Angeles Lakers	(United States)
C	6	Vassilis Kavvadas	29 – 28 December 1991	2.06 m (6 ft 9 in)	Iraklis	(Greece)
F/C	44	Dinos Mitoglou	25 – 11 June 1996	2.10 m (6 ft 11 in)	Panathinaikos	(Greece)
PG	8	Nick Calathes (C)	32 – 7 February 1989	1.98 m (6 ft 6 in)	Barcelona	(Spain)
SG	5	Giannoulis Larentzakis	27 – 22 September 1993	1.96 m (6 ft 5 in)	Olympiacos	(Greece)
G/F	1	Nikos Rogkavopoulos	20 – 27 June 2001	2.03 m (6 ft 8 in)	AEK Athens	(Greece)
C	14	Georgios Papagiannis	23 – 3 July 1997	2.20 m (7 ft 3 in)	Panathinaikos	(Greece)
PG	4	Dimitrios Katsivelis	29 – 1 October 1991	1.98 m (6 ft 6 in)	AEK Athens	(Greece)
SF	31	Charis Giannopoulos	31 – 13 July 1989	2.01 m (6 ft 7 in)	Promitheas Patras	(Greece)
PF	2	Linos Chrysikopoulos	28 – 1 December 1992	2.08 m (6 ft 10 in)	AEK Athens	(Greece)
G	10	Kostas Sloukas	31 – 15 January 1990	1.90 m (6 ft 3 in)	Olympiacos	(Greece)
F	41	Leonidas Kaselakis	31 – 1 June 1990	2.02 m (6 ft 8 in)	Panathinaikos	(Greece)

Head coach

- (United States) Rick Pitino

Assistant coach(es)

- (Greece) Thanasis Skourtopoulos
- (Greece) Ilias Papatheodorou
- (Greece) Sotiris Manolopoulos
- (United States) Richard Pitino

Legend

- (C) - Team captain
- Club – describes last
  club before the tournament
- Age – describes age
  on 29 June 2021

=== Czech Republic ===
Czech Republic men's national basketball team – 2020 FIBA Men's Olympic Qualifying Tournament roster
Players
Coaches

Pos.	No.	Name	Age – Date of birth	Height	Club	Ctr.
C	1	Patrik Auda	31 – August 29, 1989	6 ft 9 in (2.06 m)	Yokohama B-Corsairs	(Japan)
G	4	Tomáš Vyoral	28 – September 28, 1992	6 ft 3 in (1.91 m)	JIP Pardubice	(Czech Republic)
G	6	Patrick Samoura	20 – November 15, 2000	6 ft 6 in (1.98 m)	Cochise College	(United States)
G	8	Tomáš Satoranský	29 – October 30, 1991	6 ft 7 in (2.01 m)	Chicago Bulls	(United States)
F	11	Blake Schilb	37 – December 23, 1983	6 ft 6 in (1.98 m)	Champagne Châlons-Reims	(France)
C	12	Ondřej Balvín	28 – September 20, 1992	7 ft 1 in (2.16 m)	Bilbao Basket	(Spain)
G	13	Jakub Šiřina	33 – November 21, 1987	6 ft 1 in (1.85 m)	BK Opava	(Czech Republic)
C	15	Martin Peterka	26 – January 12, 1995	6 ft 8 in (2.03 m)	Löwen Braunschweig	(Germany)
F	17	Jaromír Bohačík	29 – May 26, 1992	6 ft 6 in (1.98 m)	SIG Strasbourg	(France)
G	19	Ondřej Sehnal	23 – October 10, 1997	6 ft 3 in (1.91 m)	USK Praha	(Czech Republic)
F	23	Lukáš Palyza	31 – November 10, 1989	6 ft 8 in (2.03 m)	Basketball Nymburk	(Czech Republic)
C	24	Jan Veselý	31 – April 24, 1990	7 ft 0 in (2.13 m)	Fenerbahçe Basketball	(Turkey)

Head coach

- (Israel) Ronen Ginzburg

Assistant coach(es)

- (Czech Republic) Petr Czudek
- (Czech Republic) Jan Pospíšil

Legend

- Club – describes last
  club before the tournament
- Age – describes age
  on 29 June 2021

=== Turkey ===
Roster for the 2020 FIBA Men's Olympic Qualifying Tournaments.

Turkey men's national basketball team roster
Players
Coaches

Pos.	No.	Name	Age – Date of birth	Height	Club	Ctr.
SF	1	Metecan Birsen	26 – 6 April 1995	2.05 m (6 ft 9 in)	Karşıyaka	(Turkey)
SG	2	Şehmus Hazer	22 – 15 May 1999	1.90 m (6 ft 3 in)	Beşiktaş Icrypex	(Turkey)
SF	6	Cedi Osman	26 – 8 April 1995	2.00 m (6 ft 7 in)	Cleveland Cavaliers	(United States)
PF	8	Ersan İlyasova	34 – 15 May 1987	2.08 m (6 ft 10 in)	Utah Jazz	(United States)
SG	10	Melih Mahmutoğlu	31 – 12 May 1990	1.91 m (6 ft 3 in)	Fenerbahçe	(Turkey)
PG	17	Berk Uğurlu	25 – 27 April 1996	1.90 m (6 ft 3 in)	Tofaş	(Turkey)
PG	18	Doğuş Özdemiroğlu	25 – 17 April 1996	1.91 m (6 ft 3 in)	Darüşşafaka	(Turkey)
SG	19	Buğrahan Tuncer	28 – 23 March 1993	1.94 m (6 ft 4 in)	Anadolu Efes	(Turkey)
C	21	Sertaç Şanlı	29 – 5 August 1991	2.14 m (7 ft 0 in)	FC Barcelona	(Spain)
G/F	22	Furkan Korkmaz	23 – 24 July 1997	2.00 m (6 ft 7 in)	Philadelphia 76ers	(United States)
F/C	23	Alperen Şengün	18 – 25 July 2002	2.06 m (6 ft 9 in)	Houston Rockets	(United States)
C	77	Ömer Yurtseven	23 – 19 June 1998	2.14 m (7 ft 0 in)	Miami Heat	(United States)

Head coach

- (Turkey) Orhun Ene

Assistant coach(es)

- (Turkey) Ahmet Arif Çakı
- (Turkey) Sedat Özyer
- (Turkey) Ümit Temoçin
- (Turkey) Mehmet Okur
- (Turkey) Murat Hüseyin Yılmaz

Legend

- (C) Team captain
- Club – describes last
  club before the competition
- Age – describes age
  on 29 June 2021

=== China ===
China men's national basketball team - 2020 FIBA Men's Olympic Qualifying Tournament roster
Players
Coaches

Pos.	No.	Name	Age – Date of birth	Height	Club	Ctr.
G	2	Xu Jie	21 – January 16, 2000	5 ft 11 in (1.8 m)	Guangdong Southern Tigers	(China)
G	3	Hu Mingxuan	23 – March 10, 1998	6 ft 3 in (1.91 m)	Guangdong Southern Tigers	(China)
G	4	Zhao Jiwei	25 – August 25, 1995	6 ft 1 in (1.85 m)	Liaoning Flying Leopards	(China)
F	8	Zhang Zhenlin	22 – January 28, 1999	6 ft 9 in (2.06 m)	Liaoning Flying Leopards	(China)
F	10	Zhou Peng	31 – October 11, 1989	6 ft 9 in (2.06 m)	Guangdong Southern Tigers	(China)
C	12	Ren Junfei	31 – April 2, 1990	6 ft 9 in (2.06 m)	Guangdong Southern Tigers	(China)
C	13	Liu Chuanxing	21 – July 30, 1999	7 ft 5 in (2.26 m)	Qingdao Eagles	(China)
C	14	Shen Zijie	23 – September 3, 1997	6 ft 11 in (2.11 m)	Shenzhen Aviators	(China)
C	15	Zhou Qi	25 – January 16, 1996	6 ft 11 in (2.11 m)	Xinjiang Flying Tigers	(China)
G	16	Lu Wenbo	23 – August 4, 1997	6 ft 4 in (1.93 m)	Zhejiang Golden Bulls	(China)
C	21	Wang Shaojie	24 – September 17, 1996	6 ft 10 in (2.08 m)	Beijing Royal Fighters	(China)
G	33	Wu Qian	26 – July 7, 1994	6 ft 3 in (1.91 m)	Zhejiang Golden Bulls	(China)

Head coach

- (China) Du Feng

Assistant coach(es)

- (China) Guo Shiqiang
- (China) Yang Wenhai

Legend

- Club – describes last
  club before the tournament
- Age – describes age
  on 29 June 2021

=== Uruguay ===
Uruguay national basketball team - 2020 FIBA Men's Olympic Qualifying Tournament roster
Players
Coaches

Pos.	No.	Name	Age – Date of birth	Height	Club	Ctr.
F	2	Juan Ducasse	22 – September 2, 1998	6 ft 9 in (2.06 m)	Club Trouville	(Uruguay)
G	5	Joaquín Rodríguez	22 – June 14, 1999	6 ft 4 in (1.93 m)	Obras Sanitarias	(Argentina)
G	6	Bruno Fitipaldo	29 – August 2, 1991	6 ft 1 in (1.85 m)	CB 1939 Canarias	(Spain)
F	7	Mathías Calfani	29 – January 21, 1992	6 ft 8 in (2.03 m)	Kawasaki Brave Thunders	(Japan)
F	9	Federico Haller	33 – June 5, 1988	6 ft 6 in (1.98 m)	Club Malvín	(Uruguay)
F	10	Emiliano Serres	24 – June 7, 1997	6 ft 9 in (2.06 m)	Obras Sanitarias	(Argentina)
G	11	Jayson Granger	31 – September 15, 1989	6 ft 3 in (1.91 m)	Alba Berlin	(Germany)
C	14	Nicolás Borsellino	35 – May 8, 1986	6 ft 8 in (2.03 m)	Peñarol	(Uruguay)
C	15	Esteban Batista	37 – September 2, 1983	6 ft 9 in (2.06 m)	Nacional	(Uruguay)
G	21	Luciano Parodi	27 – February 16, 1994	5 ft 10 in (1.78 m)	Minas Tênis Clube	(Brazil)
G	25	Santiago Véscovi	19 – September 14, 2001	6 ft 2 in (1.88 m)	Tennessee	(United States)
C	33	Kiril Wachsmann	36 – November 12, 1984	6 ft 8 in (2.03 m)	Club Malvín	(Uruguay)

Head coach

- (Argentina) Rubén Magnano

Assistant coach(es)

- (Uruguay) Edgardo Kogan
- (Uruguay) Javier Isis

Legend

- Club – describes last
  club before the tournament
- Age – describes age
  on 29 June 2021

== OQT Split, Croatia ==
=== Croatia ===
Croatia national basketball team – 2020 FIBA Men's Olympic Qualifying Tournament roster
Players
Coaches

Pos.	No.	Name	Age – Date of birth	Height	Club	Ctr.
C	2	Miro Bilan	31 – July 21, 1989	7 ft 0 in (2.13 m)	Dinamo Sassari	(Italy)
G	8	Mario Hezonja	26 – February 25, 1995	6 ft 7 in (2.01 m)	Panathinaikos	(Greece)
G	10	Roko Ukić	36 – December 5, 1984	6 ft 2 in (1.88 m)	Split	(Croatia)
F	12	Pavle Marčinković	32 – May 6, 1989	6 ft 6 in (1.98 m)	Split	(Croatia)
C	15	Darko Planinić	30 – November 22, 1990	6 ft 11 in (2.11 m)	Cibona	(Croatia)
G	23	Mateo Drežnjak	22 – March 8, 1999	6 ft 5 in (1.96 m)	Cibona	(Croatia)
F	26	Luka Babić	29 – September 29, 1991	6 ft 7 in (2.01 m)	Split	(Croatia)
G	32	Roko Rogić	28 – September 25, 1992	6 ft 2 in (1.88 m)	MBC	(Germany)
F	33	Željko Šakić	33 – April 14, 1988	6 ft 8 in (2.03 m)	Avtodor	(Russia)
C	41	Ante Žižić	24 – January 4, 1997	6 ft 11 in (2.11 m)	Maccabi Tel Aviv	(Israel)
G	44	Bojan Bogdanović	32 – April 18, 1989	6 ft 8 in (2.03 m)	Utah Jazz	(United States)
G	55	Antonio Jordano	22 – February 25, 1999	6 ft 3 in (1.91 m)	Zadar	(Croatia)

Head coach

- (Croatia) Veljko Mršić

Assistant coach(es)

- (Croatia) Damir Mulaomerović
- (Croatia) Domagoj Kujundžić

Legend

- Club – describes last
  club before the tournament
- Age – describes age
  on 29 June 2021

=== Russia ===
Russia national basketball team – 2020 FIBA Men's Olympic Qualifying Tournament roster
Players
Coaches

Pos.	No.	Name	Age – Date of birth	Height	Club	Ctr.
G	4	Evgeny Baburin	33 – July 4, 1987	6 ft 3 in (1.91 m)	Nizhny Novgorod	(Russia)
G	6	Grigory Motovilov	23 – February 7, 1998	6 ft 4 in (1.93 m)	Lokomotiv Kuban	(Russia)
G	7	Anton Kardanakhishvili	19 – March 19, 2002	6 ft 5 in (1.96 m)	CSKA Moscow	(Russia)
C	8	Vladimir Ivlev	31 – February 28, 1990	6 ft 9 in (2.06 m)	Parma Basket	(Russia)
G	9	Ivan Ukhov	25 – September 11, 1995	6 ft 4 in (1.93 m)	CSKA Moscow	(Russia)
F	11	Semyon Antonov	31 – July 18, 1989	6 ft 8 in (2.03 m)	CSKA Moscow	(Russia)
C	15	Timofey Mozgov	34 – July 16, 1986	7 ft 1 in (2.16 m)	Khimki	(Russia)
G	19	Ivan Strebkov	29 – July 27, 1991	6 ft 4 in (1.93 m)	Nizhny Novgorod	(Russia)
F	20	Andrey Vorontsevich	33 – July 17, 1987	6 ft 9 in (2.06 m)	CSKA Moscow	(Russia)
F	25	Anton Astapkovich	27 – January 29, 1994	6 ft 8 in (2.03 m)	Nizhny Novgorod	(Russia)
G	30	Mikhail Kulagin	26 – August 4, 1994	6 ft 3 in (1.91 m)	Enisey	(Russia)
G	44	Artem Komolov	28 – June 1, 1993	6 ft 4 in (1.93 m)	Nizhny Novgorod	(Russia)

Head coach

- (Russia) Sergei Bazarevich

Assistant coach(es)

- (Russia) Sergei Bykov
- (Russia) Dmitry Bazarevich

Legend

- Club – describes last
  club before the tournament
- Age – describes age
  on 29 June 2021

=== Brazil ===
Brazil men's national basketball team - 2020 FIBA Men's Olympic Qualifying Tournament roster
Players
Coaches

Pos.	No.	Name	Age – Date of birth	Height	Club	Ctr.
PG	2	Yago dos Santos	22 – 9 March 1999	1.68 m (5 ft 6 in)	Flamengo	(Brazil)
PG	5	Rafa Luz	29 – 11 February 1992	1.88 m (6 ft 2 in)	BC Nevėžis	(Lithuania)
SG	8	Vítor Benite	31 – 20 February 1990	1.90 m (6 ft 3 in)	San Pablo Burgos	(Spain)
PG	9	Marcelo Huertas	38 – 25 May 1983	1.90 m (6 ft 3 in)	Iberostar Tenerife	(Spain)
SF	10	Alex Garcia	41 – 4 March 1980	1.89 m (6 ft 2 in)	Bauru	(Brazil)
C	11	Anderson Varejão	38 – 28 September 1982	2.07 m (6 ft 9 in)	Cleveland Cavaliers	(United States)
SF	14	Leonardo Meindl	28 – 20 March 1993	2.00 m (6 ft 7 in)	Montakit Fuenlabrada	(Spain)
PF	18	Lucas Dias	25 – 6 July 1995	2.07 m (6 ft 9 in)	Franca	(Brazil)
C	28	Lucas Mariano	27 – 24 September 1993	2.08 m (6 ft 10 in)	São Paulo	(Brazil)
C	30	Rafael Hettsheimeir	35 – 16 June 1986	2.08 m (6 ft 10 in)	Flamengo	(Brazil)
G	32	George de Paula	25 – 24 May 1996	1.97 m (6 ft 6 in)	São Paulo	(Brazil)
PF	50	Bruno Caboclo	25 – 20 September 1995	2.02 m (6 ft 8 in)	Limoges CSP	(France)

Head coach

- (Croatia) Aleksandar Petrović

Assistant coach(es)

- (Brazil) César Guidetti
- (Brazil) Léo Figueiró

Legend

- Club – describes last
  club before the tournament
- Age – describes age
  on June 29, 2021

=== Germany ===
Germany national basketball team – 2020 FIBA Men's Olympic Qualifying Tournament roster
Players
Coaches

Pos.	No.	Name	Age – Date of birth	Height	Club	Ctr.
G	0	Isaac Bonga	21 – November 8, 1999	6 ft 8 in (2.03 m)	Washington Wizards	(United States)
G	1	Joshiko Saibou	31 – March 7, 1990	6 ft 2 in (1.88 m)	Champagne Châlons-Reims	(France)
G	4	Maodo Lô	28 – December 31, 1992	6 ft 4 in (1.93 m)	Alba Berlin	(Germany)
F	5	Niels Giffey	30 – June 8, 1991	6 ft 7 in (2.01 m)	Žalgiris	(Lithuania)
F	6	Jan Niklas Wimberg	25 – February 11, 1996	6 ft 9 in (2.06 m)	Niners Chemnitz	(Germany)
C	7	Johannes Voigtmann	28 – September 30, 1992	6 ft 10 in (2.08 m)	CSKA Moscow	(Russia)
F	12	Robin Benzing	32 – January 25, 1989	6 ft 11 in (2.11 m)	Basket Zaragoza	(Spain)
F	13	Moritz Wagner	24 – April 26, 1997	6 ft 11 in (2.11 m)	Orlando Magic	(United States)
F	19	Lukas Wank	24 – January 19, 1997	6 ft 6 in (1.98 m)	Löwen Braunschweig	(Germany)
F	22	Danilo Barthel	29 – October 24, 1991	6 ft 9 in (2.06 m)	Fenerbahçe	(Turkey)
F	32	Johannes Thiemann	27 – February 9, 1994	6 ft 9 in (2.06 m)	Alba Berlin	(Germany)
G	42	Andreas Obst	24 – July 13, 1996	6 ft 3 in (1.91 m)	ratiopharm Ulm	(Germany)

Head coach

- (Germany) Henrik Rödl

Assistant coach(es)

- (Canada) Roy Rana
- (Australia) Alan Ibrahimagic

Legend

- Club – describes last
  club before the tournament
- Age – describes age
  on 29 June 2021

=== Mexico ===
Mexico national basketball team – 2020 FIBA Men's Olympic Qualifying Tournament roster
Players
Coaches

Pos.	No.	Name	Age – Date of birth	Height	Club	Ctr.
G	2	José Estrada	27 – February 15, 1994	6 ft 2 in (1.88 m)	Soles de Mexicali	(Mexico)
F	3	Fabián Jaimes	28 – September 22, 1992	6 ft 6 in (1.98 m)	Panteras de Aguascalientes	(Mexico)
G	4	Paul Stoll	35 – December 14, 1985	5 ft 11 in (1.8 m)	Hapoel Tel Aviv	(Israel)
G	5	Diego Willis	22 – May 11, 1999	6 ft 4 in (1.93 m)	NJIT	(United States)
G	9	Francisco Cruz	31 – October 3, 1989	6 ft 3 in (1.91 m)	Afyon Belediye	(Turkey)
F	10	Gabriel Girón	33 – February 27, 1988	6 ft 3 in (1.91 m)	Centauros de Chihuahua	(Mexico)
G	13	Orlando Méndez-Valdez	35 – April 29, 1986	6 ft 0 in (1.83 m)	Capitanes de la Ciudad de México	(Mexico)
C	14	Gustavo Ayón	36 – April 1, 1985	6 ft 9 in (2.06 m)	Astros de Jalisco	(Mexico)
F	15	Jorge Camacho	32 – April 16, 1989	6 ft 8 in (2.03 m)	Leñadores de Durango	(Mexico)
C	17	Alejandro Reyna	24 – February 17, 1997	6 ft 9 in (2.06 m)	Aguacateros de Michoacán	(Mexico)
F	35	Marco Ramos	34 – February 26, 1987	6 ft 7 in (2.01 m)	Dorados de Chihuahua	(Mexico)
F	44	Daniel Amigo	25 – September 13, 1995	6 ft 10 in (2.08 m)	Pieno žvaigždės	(Lithuania)

Head coach

- (Mexico) Omar Quintero

Assistant coach(es)

- (Spain) Edu Torres
- (Mexico) Gustavo Quintero

Legend

- Club – describes last
  club before the tournament
- Age – describes age
  on 29 June 2021

=== Tunisia ===
Tunisia national basketball team – 2020 FIBA Men's Olympic Qualifying Tournament roster
Players
Coaches

Pos.	No.	Name	Age – Date of birth	Height	Club	Ctr.
F	0	Joackim Ali Haddad	22 – March 20, 1999	6 ft 5 in (1.96 m)	SMUC Marseille	(France)
G	1	Oussama Marnaoui	22 – June 16, 1999	6 ft 5 in (1.96 m)	US Monastir	(Tunisia)
G	3	Achref Gannouni	24 – April 16, 1997	6 ft 4 in (1.93 m)	Étoile Sportive de Radès	(Tunisia)
G	4	Omar Abada	28 – April 20, 1993	6 ft 2 in (1.88 m)	US Monastir	(Tunisia)
G	7	Mourad El Mabrouk	34 – October 19, 1986	6 ft 2 in (1.88 m)	Ezzahra Sports	(Tunisia)
F	9	Mohamed Hdidane	35 – April 27, 1986	6 ft 8 in (2.03 m)	Ezzahra Sports	(Tunisia)
C	11	Mokhtar Ghyaza	34 – November 15, 1986	6 ft 8 in (2.03 m)	US Monastir	(Tunisia)
F	15	Mohamed Mortadha Ben Taher	20 – October 16, 2000	6 ft 6 in (1.98 m)	Étoile Sportive de Radès	(Tunisia)
F	32	Ahmed Addami	23 – July 14, 1997	6 ft 8 in (2.03 m)	Club Africain	(Tunisia)
F	45	Radhouane Slimane	40 – August 16, 1980	6 ft 9 in (2.06 m)	US Monastir	(Tunisia)
C	50	Salah Mejri	35 – June 15, 1986	7 ft 1 in (2.16 m)	Étoile Sportive du Sahel	(Tunisia)
C	99	Mohamed Fares Ochi	22 – February 8, 1999	6 ft 11 in (2.11 m)	Club Africain	(Tunisia)

Head coach

- (Germany) Dirk Bauermann

Assistant coach(es)

- (Tunisia) Oualid Zrida
- (Tunisia) Amine Rzig

Legend

- Club – describes last
  club before the tournament
- Age – describes age
  on 29 June 2021

== OQT Kaunas, Lithuania ==
=== Lithuania ===
Lithuania men's basketball team - 2020 FIBA Men's Olympic Qualifying Tournament roster
Players
Coaches

Pos.	No.	Name	Age – Date of birth	Height	Club	Ctr.
PG	5	Mantas Kalnietis (C)	34 – September 6, 1986	1.96 m (6 ft 5 in)	Žalgiris	(Lithuania)
PF	8	Tadas Sedekerskis	23 – January 17, 1998	2.04 m (6 ft 8 in)	Baskonia	(Spain)
F/C	10	Regimantas Miniotas	24 – March 14, 1996	2.06 m (6 ft 9 in)	Bilbao Basket	(Spain)
C	11	Domantas Sabonis	25 – May 3, 1996	2.11 m (6 ft 11 in)	Indiana Pacers	(United States)
C	17	Jonas Valančiūnas	29 – May 6, 1992	2.13 m (7 ft 0 in)	Memphis Grizzlies	(United States)
SF	19	Mindaugas Kuzminskas	31 – October 19, 1989	2.06 m (6 ft 9 in)	Lokomotiv Kuban	(Russia)
PF	21	Gytis Masiulis	23 – April 10, 1998	2.06 m (6 ft 9 in)	Bilbao Basket	(Spain)
PF	22	Eimantas Bendžius	31 – April 23, 1990	2.07 m (6 ft 9 in)	Dinamo Sassari	(Italy)
SG	31	Rokas Giedraitis	28 – August 16, 1992	2.00 m (6 ft 7 in)	Baskonia	(Spain)
PG	31	Rokas Jokubaitis	20 – November 19, 2000	1.93 m (6 ft 4 in)	Barcelona	(Spain)
SG	33	Tomas Dimša	27 – January 2, 1994	1.96 m (6 ft 5 in)	Žalgiris	(Lithuania)
SG	40	Marius Grigonis	27 – April 26, 1994	1.98 m (6 ft 6 in)	CSKA Moscow	(Russia)
PG	43	Lukas Lekavičius	27 – March 30, 1994	1.81 m (5 ft 11 in)	Žalgiris	(Lithuania)
SF	51	Arnas Butkevičius	28 – October 10, 1992	1.97 m (6 ft 6 in)	Rytas	(Lithuania)

Head coach

- (Lithuania) Darius Maskoliūnas

Assistant coach(es)

- (Lithuania) Benas Matkevičius
- (Lithuania) Tomas Masiulis

Legend

- (C) Team captain
- Club – describes last
  club before the tournament
- Age – describes age
  on 29 June 2021

=== Poland ===
Poland national basketball team – 2020 FIBA Men's Olympic Qualifying Tournament roster
Players
Coaches

Pos.	No.	Name	Age – Date of birth	Height	Club	Ctr.
F	1	Jarosław Zyskowski	28 – July 16, 1992	6 ft 8 in (2.03 m)	RETAbet Bilbao Basket	(Spain)
F	2	Aleksander Balcerowski	20 – November 19, 2000	7 ft 1 in (2.16 m)	Herbalife Gran Canaria	(Spain)
F	3	Michał Sokołowski	28 – December 11, 1992	6 ft 5 in (1.96 m)	De' Longhi Treviso	(Italy)
F	5	Aaron Cel	34 – March 4, 1987	6 ft 9 in (2.06 m)	Polski Cukier Toruń	(Poland)
G	6	A. J. Slaughter	33 – August 3, 1987	6 ft 3 in (1.91 m)	Herbalife Gran Canaria	(Spain)
G	9	Mateusz Ponitka	27 – August 29, 1993	6 ft 6 in (1.98 m)	Zenit Saint Petersburg	(Russia)
G	10	Łukasz Kolenda	21 – July 28, 1999	6 ft 5 in (1.96 m)	Trefl Sopot	(Poland)
G	23	Michał Michalak	27 – November 2, 1993	6 ft 6 in (1.98 m)	SYNTAINICS MBC	(Germany)
G	30	Jakub Garbacz	27 – March 17, 1994	6 ft 6 in (1.98 m)	Arged BM Slam Stal	(Poland)
C	34	Adam Hrycaniuk	37 – March 15, 1984	6 ft 9 in (2.06 m)	Asseco Arka Gdynia	(Poland)
G	55	Łukasz Koszarek	37 – January 12, 1984	6 ft 2 in (1.88 m)	Enea Zastal Zielona Góra	(Poland)
C	77	Damian Kulig	34 – June 23, 1987	6 ft 9 in (2.06 m)	Polski Cukier Toruń	(Poland)

Head coach

- (United States) Mike Taylor

Assistant coach(es)

- (Poland) Arkadiusz Miłoszewski
- (Poland) Marcin Woźniak

Legend

- Club – describes last
  club before the tournament
- Age – describes age
  on 29 June 2021

=== Slovenia ===
Slovenia national basketball team – 2020 FIBA Men's Olympic Qualifying Tournament roster
Players
Coaches

Pos.	No.	Name	Age – Date of birth	Height	Club	Ctr.
G	5	Luka Rupnik	28 – May 20, 1993	6 ft 1 in (1.85 m)	Cedevita Olimpija	(Slovenia)
G	6	Aleksej Nikolić	26 – February 21, 1995	6 ft 3 in (1.91 m)	BCM Gravelines-Dunkerque	(France)
G	7	Klemen Prepelič	28 – October 20, 1992	6 ft 2 in (1.88 m)	Valencia Basket	(Spain)
F	8	Edo Murić	29 – November 27, 1991	6 ft 8 in (2.03 m)	Cedevita Olimpija	(Slovenia)
C	10	Mike Tobey	26 – October 10, 1994	6 ft 11 in (2.11 m)	Valencia Basket	(Spain)
G	11	Jaka Blažič	30 – June 30, 1990	6 ft 5 in (1.96 m)	Cedevita Olimpija	(Slovenia)
F	15	Gregor Hrovat	26 – August 18, 1994	6 ft 5 in (1.96 m)	Cholet	(France)
C	27	Žiga Dimec	28 – February 20, 1993	6 ft 11 in (2.11 m)	Cedevita Olimpija	(Slovenia)
F	30	Zoran Dragić	32 – June 22, 1989	6 ft 5 in (1.96 m)	Saski Baskonia	(Spain)
F	31	Vlatko Čančar	24 – April 10, 1997	6 ft 8 in (2.03 m)	Denver Nuggets	(United States)
F	55	Jakob Čebašek	30 – April 28, 1991	6 ft 7 in (2.01 m)	Dinamo București	(Romania)
F	77	Luka Dončić	22 – February 28, 1999	6 ft 7 in (2.01 m)	Dallas Mavericks	(United States)

Head coach

- (Slovenia) Aleksander Sekulić

Assistant coach(es)

- (Slovenia) Dalibor Damjanović
- (Slovenia) Jernej Valentinčič

Legend

- Club – describes last
  club before the tournament
- Age – describes age
  on 29 June 2021

=== Venezuela ===
Venezuela national basketball team – 2020 FIBA Men's Olympic Qualifying Tournament roster
Players
Coaches

Pos.	No.	Name	Age – Date of birth	Height	Club	Ctr.
G	5	Gregory Vargas	35 – February 18, 1986	5 ft 11 in (1.8 m)	Cocodrilos de Caracas	(Venezuela)
F	6	Garly Sojo	21 – September 23, 1999	6 ft 5 in (1.96 m)	Broncos de Caracas	(Venezuela)
G	8	David Cubillán	33 – July 27, 1987	6 ft 0 in (1.83 m)	Trotamundos	(Venezuela)
G	9	Pedro Chourio	31 – March 13, 1990	6 ft 1 in (1.85 m)	Spartans Distrito Capital	(Venezuela)
F	10	José Gregorio Vargas	39 – January 23, 1982	6 ft 5 in (1.96 m)	Gigantes de Guayana	(Venezuela)
F	11	Luis Bethelmy	34 – October 14, 1986	6 ft 7 in (2.01 m)	Cocodrilos de Caracas	(Venezuela)
F	13	Anyelo José Cisneros Sierra	24 – January 31, 1997	6 ft 6 in (1.98 m)	Diablos de Miranda	(Venezuela)
F	14	Miguel Ruiz	30 – December 20, 1990	6 ft 8 in (2.03 m)	Gimnasia y Esgrima	(Argentina)
C	15	Windi Graterol	34 – September 10, 1986	6 ft 8 in (2.03 m)	Spartans Distrito Capital	(Venezuela)
G	19	Heissler Guillent	34 – December 17, 1986	6 ft 0 in (1.83 m)	Guaiqueríes de Margarita	(Venezuela)
G	20	Yohanner Sifontes	25 – August 19, 1995	6 ft 2 in (1.88 m)	Spartans Distrito Capital	(Venezuela)
F	24	Michael Carrera	28 – January 7, 1993	6 ft 5 in (1.96 m)	Guaiqueríes de Margarita	(Venezuela)

Head coach

- (Argentina) Fernando Duró

Assistant coach(es)

- (Venezuela) Pablo Favarel
- (Venezuela) Ronald Guillén

Legend

- Club – describes last
  club before the tournament
- Age – describes age
  on 29 June 2021

=== South Korea ===
2021 Squad at the 2020 FIBA Men's Olympic Qualifying Tournaments – Kaunas

South Korea FIBA Men's Olympic Qualifying Tournaments roster
Players
Coaches

Pos.	No.	Name	Age – Date of birth	Height	Club	Ctr.
G/F	1	Lee Hyun-jung	20 – October 23, 2000	2.01 m (6 ft 7 in)	Davidson	(United States)
G	2	Byeon Jun-hyeong	25 – March 11, 1996	1.86 m (6 ft 1 in)	Anyang KGC	(South Korea)
G	4	Kim Nak-hyeon	26 – March 12, 1995	1.80 m (5 ft 11 in)	Incheon Electroland Elephants	(South Korea)
C	8	Ha Yun-gi	22 – March 12, 1999	2.03 m (6 ft 8 in)	Korea University	(South Korea)
F	10	Moon Seong-gon	28 – May 9, 1993	1.93 m (6 ft 4 in)	Anyang KGC	(South Korea)
F	11	Yang Hong-seok	24 – February 7, 1997	1.99 m (6 ft 6 in)	Busan KT Sonicboom	(South Korea)
F	13	Kang Sang-jae	26 – December 31, 1994	2.03 m (6 ft 8 in)	Incheon Electroland Elephants	(South Korea)
F	20	Ra Gun-ah	32 – February 20, 1989	2.03 m (6 ft 8 in)	Jeonju KCC Egis	(South Korea)
F/C	22	Yeo Jun-seok	19 – March 20, 2002	2.06 m (6 ft 9 in)	Yongsan High School	(South Korea)
G	23	Jeon Seong-hyun	29 – November 5, 1991	1.90 m (6 ft 3 in)	Anyang KGC	(South Korea)
C	33	Lee Seoung-hyun	29 – April 16, 1992	1.98 m (6 ft 6 in)	Goyang Orion Orions	(South Korea)
SG	43	Lee Dae-sung	31 – May 30, 1990	1.93 m (6 ft 4 in)	Goyang Orion Orions	(South Korea)

Head coach

- (South Korea) Cho Sang-hyun

Assistant coach(es)

- (South Korea) Kim Dong-woo

Legend

- (C) Team captain
- Club – describes last
  club before the tournament
- Age – describes age
  on June 30, 2021

=== Angola ===
Angola national basketball team – 2020 FIBA Men's Olympic Qualifying Tournament roster
Players
Coaches

Pos.	No.	Name	Age – Date of birth	Height	Club	Ctr.
C	2	Yanick Moreira	29 – July 31, 1991	6 ft 9 in (2.06 m)	AEK	(Greece)
G	3	Selton Miguel	20 – October 24, 2000	6 ft 4 in (1.93 m)	Kansas State	(United States)
C	8	Jilson Bango	22 – January 6, 1999	6 ft 10 in (2.08 m)	Primeiro de Agosto	(Angola)
G	10	Joshua Pereira Kashila	22 – April 15, 1999	6 ft 3 in (1.91 m)	SAGU	(United States)
F	11	Teotonio Dò	27 – March 20, 1994	6 ft 9 in (2.06 m)	Primeiro de Agosto	(Angola)
F	13	Aboubakar Gakou	24 – May 27, 1997	6 ft 7 in (2.01 m)	Petro de Luanda	(Angola)
G	14	Edson Ndoniema	30 – February 11, 1991	6 ft 4 in (1.93 m)	Primeiro de Agosto	(Angola)
F	15	Eduardo Mingas	42 – January 29, 1979	6 ft 6 in (1.98 m)	Primeiro de Agosto	(Angola)
G	16	Hermenegildo Santos	30 – August 16, 1990	6 ft 3 in (1.91 m)	Primeiro de Agosto	(Angola)
G	19	Glofate Buiamba	22 – January 5, 1999	6 ft 5 in (1.96 m)	Interclube	(Angola)
F	23	Malick Cisse	28 – April 24, 1993	6 ft 8 in (2.03 m)	Primeiro de Agosto	(Angola)
G	47	Pedro Bastos	28 – January 8, 1993	6 ft 4 in (1.93 m)	Primeiro de Agosto	(Angola)

Head coach

- (Spain) Josep Clarós

Assistant coach(es)

- (Angola) Aníbal Moreira
- (Angola) Miguel Lutonda

Legend

- Club – describes last
  club before the tournament
- Age – describes age
  on 29 June 2021

== OQT Belgrade, Serbia ==
=== Serbia ===
The following is the Serbia roster for the Olympic Qualifying Tournament.

Serbia national basketball team – 2020 FIBA Men's Olympic Qualifying Tournament roster
Players
Coaches

Pos.	No.	Name	Age – Date of birth	Height	Club	Ctr.
C	3	Filip Petrušev	21 – 15 April 2000	2.10 m (6 ft 11 in)	Mega Basket	(Serbia)
PG	4	Miloš Teodosić (C)	34 – 19 March 1987	1.95 m (6 ft 5 in)	Virtus Bologna	(Italy)
PF	8	Nemanja Bjelica	33 – 9 May 1988	2.09 m (6 ft 10 in)	Miami Heat	(United States)
SF	10	Nikola Kalinić	29 – 8 November 1991	2.02 m (6 ft 8 in)	Valencia	(Spain)
SG	12	Dragan Milosavljević	32 – 11 May 1989	1.98 m (6 ft 6 in)	Mega Basket	(Serbia)
G	22	Vasilije Micić	27 – 13 January 1994	1.95 m (6 ft 5 in)	Anadolu Efes	(Turkey)
PG	24	Stefan Jović	30 – 3 November 1990	1.96 m (6 ft 5 in)	Khimki	(Russia)
SF	27	Dejan Davidovac	26 – 17 January 1995	2.03 m (6 ft 8 in)	Crvena zvezda	(Serbia)
PG	30	Aleksa Avramović	26 – 25 October 1994	1.92 m (6 ft 4 in)	Estudiantes	(Spain)
SG	31	Ognjen Dobrić	26 – 27 October 1994	1.98 m (6 ft 6 in)	Crvena zvezda	(Serbia)
SF	33	Danilo Anđušić	30 – 22 April 1991	1.95 m (6 ft 5 in)	JL Bourg	(France)
C	51	Boban Marjanović	32 – 15 August 1988	2.22 m (7 ft 3 in)	Dallas Mavericks	(United States)

Head coach

- (Serbia) Igor Kokoškov

Assistant coach(es)

- (Serbia) Jovica Antonić
- (Serbia) Dejan Milojević
- (Serbia) Vladimir Jovanović

Legend

- (C) Team captain
- Club – describes last
  club before the tournament
- Age – describes age
  on 29 June 2021

=== Italy ===
Italy national basketball team – 2020 FIBA Olympic Qualifying Tournaments roster
Players
Coaches

Pos.	No.	Name	Age – Date of birth	Height	Club	Ctr.
PG	0	Marco Spissu	26 – 5 February 1995	1.84 m (6 ft 0 in)	Banco di Sardegna Sassari	(Italy)
PG	1	Nico Mannion	19 – 4 September 2001	1.88 m (6 ft 2 in)	Golden State Warriors	(United States)
SG	7	Stefano Tonut	27 – 7 November 1993	1.94 m (6 ft 4 in)	Reyer Venezia	(Italy)
PF	9	Nicolò Melli	30 – 26 January 1991	2.06 m (6 ft 9 in)	Dallas Mavericks	(United States)
SF	13	Simone Fontecchio	25 – 9 December 1995	2.03 m (6 ft 8 in)	Alba Berlin	(Germany)
C	16	Amedeo Tessitori	26 – 7 October 1994	2.08 m (6 ft 10 in)	Virtus Bologna	(Italy)
PF	17	Giampaolo Ricci	29 – 27 September 1991	2.02 m (6 ft 8 in)	Virtus Bologna	(Italy)
SF	23	Awudu Abass	28 – 27 January 1993	1.98 m (6 ft 6 in)	Virtus Bologna	(Italy)
SF	24	Riccardo Moraschini	30 – 8 January 1991	1.94 m (6 ft 4 in)	Olimpia Milano	(Italy)
SG	31	Michele Vitali	29 – 31 October 1991	1.96 m (6 ft 5 in)	Brose Bamberg	(Germany)
PF	33	Achille Polonara	29 – 23 November 1991	2.05 m (6 ft 9 in)	Saski Baskonia	(Spain)
PG	54	Alessandro Pajola	21 – 9 November 1999	1.94 m (6 ft 4 in)	Virtus Bologna	(Italy)

Head coach

- (Italy) Meo Sacchetti

Assistant coach(es)

- (Italy) Emanuele Molin
- (Italy) Piero Bucchi
- (Italy) Paolo Galbiati
- (Italy) Riccardo Fois

Legend

- (C) Team captain
- Club – describes last
  club before the tournament
- Age – describes age
  on 29 June 2021

=== Puerto Rico ===
Puerto Rico national basketball team – 2020 Summer Olympics qualification tournament roster
Players
Coaches

Pos.	No.	Name	Age – Date of birth	Height	Club	Ctr.
F	0	Isaiah Piñeiro	24 – February 28, 1997	6 ft 7 in (2.01 m)	Darüşşafaka	(Turkey)
PF	1	George Conditt	20 – August 22, 2000	6 ft 11 in (2.11 m)	Iowa State Cyclones	(United States)
G	9	Gary Browne	28 – March 24, 1993	6 ft 1 in (1.85 m)	Dolomiti Energia Trento	(Italy)
G	10	Iván Gandia	23 – September 14, 1997	6 ft 2 in (1.88 m)	Inter Bratislava	(Slovakia)
C	12	Jorge Díaz	31 – November 13, 1989	6 ft 11 in (2.11 m)	Piratas de Quebradillas	(Puerto Rico)
PF	15	Timajh Parker-Rivera	27 – February 9, 1994	6 ft 8 in (2.03 m)	Gigantes de Carolina	(Puerto Rico)
SG	22	Emmanuel Andújar	29 – January 27, 1992	6 ft 6 in (1.98 m)	Santeros de Aguada	(Puerto Rico)
SG	23	Isaac Sosa	31 – February 16, 1990	6 ft 3 in (1.91 m)	Cangrejeros de Santurce	(Puerto Rico)
G	24	Gian Clavell	27 – November 26, 1993	6 ft 4 in (1.93 m)	Promitheas Patras	(Greece)
F	32	Christopher Ortiz	28 – April 2, 1993	6 ft 8 in (2.03 m)	Brujos de Guayama	(Puerto Rico)
PF	34	Arnaldo Toro Barea	22 – October 28, 1998	6 ft 9 in (2.06 m)	St. John's Red Storm	(United States)
F	42	Gilberto Clavell	31 – August 10, 1989	6 ft 7 in (2.01 m)	Santeros de Aguada	(Puerto Rico)

Head coach

- (Puerto Rico) Eddie Casiano

Assistant coach(es)

- (Puerto Rico) Manolo Cintrón
- (Puerto Rico) Rafael Torres

Legend

- (C) Team captain
- Club – describes last
  club before the tournament
- Age – describes age
  on 29 June 2021

=== Dominican Republic ===
Dominican Republic men's national basketball team roster
Players
Coaches

Pos.	No.	Name	Age – Date of birth	Height	Club	Ctr.
SG	1	Brandone Francis	26 – 10 September 1994	1.93 m (6 ft 4 in)	Acunsa GBC	(Spain)
G	2	Rigoberto Mendoza	28 – 6 July 1992	1.90 m (6 ft 3 in)	Santeros de Aguada	(Puerto Rico)
SG	3	Adonys Henriquez	26 – 13 November 1994	1.98 m (6 ft 6 in)	Río Ourense Termal	(Spain)
PG	4	Gelvis Solano	27 – 1 June 1994	1.85 m (6 ft 1 in)	Trillizos de Medellin	(Colombia)
SG	5	Víctor Liz	35 – 12 May 1986	1.88 m (6 ft 2 in)	Leones de Ponce	(Puerto Rico)
SF	7	Sadiel Rojas	31 – 16 July 1989	1.93 m (6 ft 4 in)	UCAM Murcia	(Spain)
PG	10	Andrés Feliz	23 – 15 July 1997	1.83 m (6 ft 0 in)	Prat	(Spain)
PF	13	Angel Nuñez	29 – 9 October 1991	2.03 m (6 ft 8 in)	Mets de Guaynabo	(Puerto Rico)
PF	15	Brayan Martínez	29 – 9 October 1991	2.03 m (6 ft 8 in)	Panteras	(Panama)
C	30	Jhonatan Araújo	24 – 19 July 1996	2.08 m (6 ft 10 in)	Club Atlético Peñarol	(Uruguay)
PG	33	Mike Torres	26 – 24 November 1994	1.89 m (6 ft 2 in)	Real Betis	(Spain)
C	40	Luís Santos	26 – 6 December 1994	2.03 m (6 ft 8 in)	Bameso	(Dominican Republic)

Head coach

- (Dominican Republic) Melvyn Lopez

Assistant coach(es)

- (Dominican Republic) José Mercedes Rosario
- (Venezuela) David Díaz

Legend

- (C) Team captain
- Club – describes last
  club before the tournament
- Age – describes age
  on 29 June 2021

=== Philippines ===
The following is the Philippines' final roster for the Olympic Qualifying Tournament which was announced on 24 June 2021.

Philippines national basketball team – 2020 FIBA Olympic Qualifying Tournament roster
Players
Coaches

Pos.	No.	Name	Age – Date of birth	Height	Club	Ctr.
G	3	RJ Abarrientos	21 – September 14, 1999	1.81 m (5 ft 11 in)	FEU	(Philippines)
F/C	5	Isaac Go (C)	25 – June 7, 1996	2.00 m (6 ft 7 in)	Terrafirma Dyip	(Philippines)
G/F	7	Mike Nieto	24 – May 31, 1997	1.88 m (6 ft 2 in)	Rain or Shine Elasto Painters	(Philippines)
F/C	11	Kai Sotto	19 – May 11, 2002	2.16 m (7 ft 1 in)	Adelaide 36ers	(Australia)
G	15	Jordan Heading	25 – January 30, 1996	1.88 m (6 ft 2 in)	San Miguel Alab Pilipinas	(Philippines)
C	18	Geo Chiu	20 – May 18, 2001	2.03 m (6 ft 8 in)	Ateneo	(Philippines)
G/F	23	William Navarro	24 – February 3, 1997	1.99 m (6 ft 6 in)	Ateneo	(Philippines)
G	24	Dwight Ramos	22 – September 2, 1998	1.93 m (6 ft 4 in)	Ateneo	(Philippines)
G	27	S. J. Belangel	22 – June 27, 1999	1.77 m (5 ft 10 in)	Ateneo	(Philippines)
F	28	Justine Baltazar	24 – February 19, 1997	2.03 m (6 ft 8 in)	De La Salle	(Philippines)
F	33	Carl Tamayo	20 – February 13, 2001	2.01 m (6 ft 7 in)	NU	(Philippines)
C	34	Angelo Kouame	23 – December 15, 1997	2.11 m (6 ft 11 in)	Ateneo	(Philippines)

Head coach

- (New Zealand) Tab Baldwin

Assistant coach(es)

- (Philippines) Jong Uichico
- (Philippines) Sandy Arespacochaga

Legend

- (C) Team captain
- Club – describes last
  club before the tournament
- Age – describes age
  on June 30, 2021
