= 2024–25 Championnat Pro A =

- League: Championnat Pro A
- Season: Regular season
- Duration: 21 September 2024 – TBD 2025

Regular season
- Relegated: ES Goulettoise

Finals
- Champions: Club Africain (5th title)
- Runners-up: US Monastir

The 2024–25 Championnat Pro A season was the 70th season of the Championnat Pro A, the top-tier basketball league in Tunisia. The season began on 21 September 2024 and ended 31 May 2025. It featured ten teams competing in multiple phases: a regular season, followed by the Super 6, playoffs, and finals.

Club Africain won their fifth championship after winning the finals over US Monastir, and thus qualified for the 2026 BAL season for the first time.

== Regular season ==
| Pos | Team | Pld | W | L | Pts | Qualification |
|---|---|---|---|---|---|---|
| 1 | JS Kairouanaise | 18 | 16 | 2 | 34 | Qualified for Super 6 |
| 2 | Club Africain | 18 | 15 | 3 | 33 | Qualified for Super 6 |
| 3 | US Monastir | 18 | 15 | 3 | 33 | Qualified for Super 6 |
| 4 | Etoile Sportive Sahel | 18 | 12 | 6 | 30 | Qualified for Super 6 |
| 5 | Dalia Sportive de Grombalia | 18 | 8 | 10 | 26 | Qualified for Super 6 |
| 6 | US Ansar | 18 | 7 | 11 | 25 | Qualified for Super 6 |
| 7 | JS Menazah | 18 | 6 | 12 | 24 | To relegation round |
| 8 | ES Goulettoise | 18 | 6 | 12 | 24 | To relegation round |
| 9 | BC Mahdia | 18 | 3 | 15 | 21 | To relegation round |
| 10 | ES Rades | 18 | 2 | 16 | 20 | To relegation round |

Source: Sofascore

== Super 6 ==
| Pos | Team | Pld | W | L | Pts | Qualification |
|---|---|---|---|---|---|---|
| 1 | US Monastir | 10 | 8 | 2 | 18 | Qualified for Playoffs |
| 2 | Club Africain | 10 | 8 | 2 | 18 | Qualified for Playoffs |
| 3 | JS Kairouanaise | 10 | 7 | 3 | 17 | Qualified for Playoffs |
| 4 | Etoile Sportive Sahel | 10 | 4 | 6 | 14 | Qualified for Playoffs |
| 5 | US Ansar | 10 | 2 | 8 | 12 | |
| 6 | Dalia Sportive de Grombalia | 10 | 1 | 9 | 11 | |

Source: Sofascore

== Relegation round ==
| Pos | Team | Pld | W | L | Pts | Qualification |
|---|---|---|---|---|---|---|
| 1 | ES Rades | 6 | 6 | 0 | 12 | |
| 2 | BC Mahdia | 6 | 3 | 3 | 9 | |
| 3 | JS Menazah | 6 | 2 | 4 | 8 | |
| 4 | ES Goulettoise (R) | 6 | 1 | 5 | 7 | Relegated |

Source: Sofascore
(R) Relegated

== Playouts ==
| Pos | Team | Pld | W | L | Pts | Qualification |
|---|---|---|---|---|---|---|
| 1 | JS Menazah | 9 | 6 | 3 | 15 | |
| 2 | ES Rades | 10 | 6 | 4 | 16 | |
| 3 | US Ansar | 10 | 5 | 5 | 15 | |
| 4 | Dalia Sportive de Grombalia | 10 | 5 | 5 | 15 | |
| 5 | BC Mahdia | 10 | 5 | 5 | 15 | |
| 6 | AS Hammamet (R) | 10 | 3 | 7 | 13 | Relegated |

Source: Sofascore
(R) Relegated

== Super Playoffs ==
Semifinals
1 | US Monastir | 72 | 68 | 52 | 71 | 70 | 3
4 | Etoile Sportive Sahel | 55 | 61 | 57 | 74 | 51 | 2
2 | Club Africain | 87 | 82 | 63 | 2
3 | JS Kairouanaise | 77 | 77 | 71 | 1

Finals
1 | US Monastir | 73 | 73 | 53 | 75 | 1
2 | Club Africain | 77 | 60 | 70 | 77 | 3
