= Oussama Marnaoui =

Tunisian basketball player

No. 7 – Club Africain
- Position: Shooting guard
- League: CNA

Personal information
- Born: 16 June 1999 (age 27) Kairouan, Tunisia
- Listed height: 1.93 m (6 ft 4 in)

Career information
- High school: Wesley Christian High School (Allen City, Kentucky)
- NBA draft: 2021: undrafted
- Playing career: 2019–present

Career history
- 2019–2020: JS Kairouan
- 2020–2024: US Monastir
- 2024–2025: JS Kairouan
- 2025–present: Club Africain

Career highlights
- 1x BAL champion (2022); 4× Tunisian League champion (2021, 2022, 2023, 2024); 2× Tunisian Cup winner (2021, 2022); 1× Tunisian Super Cup winner (2025); 1× Tunisian Federation Cup winner (2025); 2× Tunisian League Finals MVP (2023, 2024); 2× Tunisian League All-First Team (2023, 2024)

Oussama Marnaoui (born 16 June 1999) is a Tunisian professional basketball player for Club Africain and the Tunisian national team.

Marnaoui began his professional career with JS Kairouan, where he played for one season before moving to US Monastir. During his time with Monastir, he won three consecutive league titles and was named Finals MVP in their 2023 championship season. He returned to JS Kairouan for the 2024–25 season, and in 2025, he signed with defending champions Club Africain.

He represented Tunisia at the FIBA AfroBasket 2021, where the team won the gold medal.

== BAL career statistics ==
Legend
| GP | Games played | GS | Games started | MPG | Minutes per game |
| FG% | Field goal percentage | 3P% | 3-point field goal percentage | FT% | Free throw percentage |
| RPG | Rebounds per game | APG | Assists per game | SPG | Steals per game |
| BPG | Blocks per game | PPG | Points per game | **Bold** | Career high |

| Year | Team | GP | GS | MPG | FG% | 3P% | FT% | RPG | APG | SPG | BPG | PPG |
|---|---|---|---|---|---|---|---|---|---|---|---|---|
| 2021 | Monastir | 4 | 0 | 5.9 | .455 | .333 | .769 | 1.0 | .0 | .5 | .3 | 5.3 |
| Career | | 4 | 0 | 5.9 | .455 | .333 | .769 | 1.0 | .0 | .5 | .3 | 5.3 |
