= Kyle Vinales =

American basketball player

Free agent
- Position: Point guard / shooting guard

Personal information
- Born: June 18, 1992 (age 34) Farmington Hills, Michigan, U.S.
- Listed height: 6 ft 2 in (1.88 m)
- Listed weight: 180 lb (82 kg)

Career information
- High school: North Farmington (Farmington Hills, Michigan); The Phelps School (Malvern, Pennsylvania)
- College: Central Connecticut (2011–2015)
- NBA draft: 2015: undrafted
- Playing career: 2015–present

Career history
- 2015: Vaqueros de Bayamón
- 2015–2016: Club Africain
- 2016: Brujos de Guayama
- 2016–2017: Club Africain
- 2017: Brujos de Guayama
- 2017–2018: US Monastir
- 2018: Caciques de Humacao
- 2018–2019: AEK Larnaca
- 2019: Brujos de Guayama
- 2019–2020: Kalev/Cramo
- 2020–2021: Lietkabelis
- 2021: Cangrejeros de Santurce
- 2021: Gigantes de Carolina
- 2021–2022: SC Derby
- 2022: Mets de Guaynabo
- 2022–2023: SLUC Nancy Basket
- 2023: Legia Warszawa
- 2023: Indios de Mayagüez
- 2023–2024: Avtodor
- 2024: Indios de Mayagüez
- 2024–2025: Zamalek
- 2025: Al Ittihad Alexandria
- 2025–2026: Pécs
- 2026: Guizhou Raptors
- 2026: Sichuan Blue Whales
- 2026: Niagara River Lions

Career highlights
- Tunisian League champion (2015); Tunisian League Finals MVP (2015); Tunisian League MVP (2015); Cypriot League All-Star (2018); BSN All Star (2018); VTB League All-Star (2020); First-team All-NEC (2013); NEC Rookie of the Year (2012); NEC All-Rookie Team (2012)

Kyle Vinales (born June 18, 1992) (/vɪnælɛz/) is a Puerto Rican professional basketball player. He previously played college basketball for the Central Connecticut Blue Devils.

== High school career ==
Vinales began playing basketball with The Phelps School in Malvern, Pennsylvania. Under head coach Brian Shanahan, he emerged as a pure scorer with a diverse attacking game. However, the combo guard would later move to North Farmington High School and start playing with coach Tom Negoshian. He spent his sophomore, junior, and senior seasons at Farmington Hills. In his last year with North Farmington, Vinales averaged about 25.7 points per game. Some of his greatest honors in high school include All-Oakland County and Second Team All-State.

== Collegiate career ==
Before committing to Central Connecticut State University, Vinales was rated as a one-star recruit by ESPN Recruiting Nation Basketball with a scout grade of 78. He officially signed with the team on November 8, 2010.

Vinales made an excellent career debut after scoring 24 points and recording 5 steals in a loss against Yale on November 11, 2011. He would score a season-high 39 points in his second game against Niagara. Due to his performances, Vinales was named Northeast Conference Rookie of the Week on several occasions, but never earned more prestigious honors.

In his sophomore season at CCSU, Vinales became known as one of the top scorers in the NCAA. He averaged the seventh-most points in the Division I and became the quickest player in school history to reach the 1,000 point ceiling. Vinales was named NEC Player of the Week during the season, and was also named the conference's Rookie of the Year, making the All-Rookie Team as well. Following the season, Vinales made the decision to return to Central Connecticut despite the strong possibility of the transfer.

In his third year playing basketball for CCSU, Vinales continued to be one of the most aggressive scorers in the NCAA. However, in January 2014, Vinales injured his shooting hand during practice. Howie Dickenman, the team's head coach, made the statement, "You hate to see it happen to someone who works so hard."

Kyle never played in his senior year. He announced that he would not be playing via Twitter, saying "No more college ball for me. Time to start my pro career" after he was arrested in October 2014 for allegedly assaulting his girlfriend. He ended his career with 1,514 points and hopes to play in the NBA. However, he was later signed by the Puerto Rican team Vaqueros de Bayamon for the 2015 season.

== Professional career ==
In 2015 Vinales won the Tunisian League MVP, averaging 22.4 points and 6 assists per game, while also winning the Tunisian championship that same year. In 2018, he was named into the all-BSN team, which is an honour for the Puerto Rican league's top five players. During the BSN season, he averaged 20.1 points, 3.4 rebounds, and 3.6 assists per game for the Grises de Humacao.

On September 30, 2019, Vinales signed with Kalev/Cramo of the Latvian–Estonian League.

On July 12, 2020, he signed with Lietkabelis of the Lithuanian Basketball League. Vinales played for Gigantes de Carolina of the Puerto Rican league in 2021, averaging 11.2 points, 5.0 assists, and 3.4 rebounds per game. On September 7, 2021, he signed with KK Studentski centar of the Prva A Liga and the ABA League.

In February, 2022, Vinales signed with Mets de Guaynabo of the Puerto Rican League.

On July 4, 2022, he signed with SLUC Nancy Basket of the LNB Pro A.

On January 1, 2023, he signed with Legia Warszawa of the Polish Basketball League.

=== The Basketball Tournament ===
Vinales joined House of 'Paign, a team composed primarily of Illinois alumni in The Basketball Tournament 2020. He scored five points and dished out four assists in a 76–53 win over War Tampa in the first round.
