= Adel Tlatli =

Tunisian basketball coach (born 1958)

US Monastir
- Position: Head coach
- League: Championnat Pro A BAL

Personal information
- Born: 31 August 1958 (age 68)
- Coaching career: 1986–present

Career history

Coaching
- 1986–1989: Stade Nabeulien
- 1989–1990: Dalia Sportive de Grombalia
- 1990–1991: Stade Nabeulien
- 1991–1993: US Monastir
- 1993–1994: Stade Nabeulien
- 1994–1995: US Monastir
- 1995–1996: Club Africain
- 1996–1997: Ezzahra Sports
- 1997–1998: Stade Nabeulien
- 1998–1999: El Akma
- 1999–2000: CS Sfax
- 2000–2004: JS Kairouan
- 2001: Tunisia
- 2004–2016: Tunisia
- 2016–2018: ES Radès
- 2020–2022: Kuwait
- 2023–present: US Monastir

Career highlights
- As head coach: 6× Championnat Pro A champion (1989, 2001–2003, 2007, 2008); 3× Tunisian Cup winner (2002, 2017, 2018); Maghreb Championship winner (2003); Kuwaiti League champion (2012)
Medals
Head coach for Tunisia
men's national basketball team
AfroBasket
Gold medal – first place	Madagascar 2011
Bronze medal – third place	Libya 2009
Bronze medal – third place	Tunisia 2015
Arab Championship
Gold medal – first place	Rabat 2009
Gold medal – first place	Tunis 2008
Mediterranean Games
Bronze medal – third place	Turkey 2013

Mohamed Adel Tlatli (born 31 August 1958) is a Tunisian professional basketball coach. He is the current head coach of US Monastir of the Championnat Pro A and the Basketball Africa League (BAL). He is a six-time national champion and a three-time national cup winner.

Tlatli coached the Tunisia national team for 12 years (in 2001 and from 2004 to 2016), guiding them to AfroBasket gold in 2011 and bronze in 2009. He is the current head coach of the Kuwait national team.

== Coaching career ==
=== National team career ===
==== Tunisia ====
Tlati began as head coach of the senior men's Tunisian national basketball team in 2001, and coached them for 12 years between 2004 and 2016. He coached the team since the FIBA Africa Championship 2001.

Tlati was re-appointed in April 2004. At the FIBA Africa Championship 2009, Tlatli led the team to a bronze medal, earning the nation's first ever FIBA World Championship berth in 2010. Tlatli coached Tunisia at the 2012 Olympics, where they finished in 12th place.

In 2020, Tlati spent weeks learning from United States head coach Mike Krzyzewski at Duke University.

Tlati and the Tunisian federation decided to part ways in 2016, leaving as the longest-serving coach in Africa in 15 years.

==== Kuwait ====
Since 2020, Tlati coaches the Kuwait national team.

=== Club career ===
Tlati began his career with Stade Nabeulien. He later coached Dalia Sportive de Grombalia, US Monastir, Club Africain, Ezzahra Sports and CS Sfax during the 1980s and 1990s.

In the 2000s, he only coached JS Kairouan for four years between 2000 and 2004, winning three Championnat Pro A championships and one Tunisian Cup.

Between 2016 and 2018, Tlati coached ES Radès.

He signed as head coach for US Monastir in December 2023 for a third stint with the team, returning to the team after 28 years.

== See also ==
- List of FIBA AfroBasket winning head coaches
