= Tunisian Basketball Federation Cup =

- Organising body: Tunisia Basketball Federation
- Founded: 1995; 31 years ago
- First season: 1995
- Country: Tunisia
- Confederation: FIBA Africa
- Current champions: ES Radès (1st title) (2026)
- Most championships: Club Africain (4 titles)

The Tunisian Basketball Federation Cup or FTBB Cup, is an annual basketball cup in Tunisian men's basketball. The tournament is organised by the Tunisia Basketball Federation (FTBB).

It is contested by the teams that did not qualify for the play-off phase of the Championnat Pro A. Since 2018, the games are played during the FIBA national teams qualifiers which means most games are contested without team's internationals. Club Africain is the record holder for most titles, with a total of four. The current champion is ES Radès, who won the title in the 2026.

== History ==
In the 2012 final, the US Monastir beat Ezzahra Sports at the Kairouan Indoor Sports Hall and the JS Kairouan in the semi-final. In the 2013 final, the CA Bizertin won the final 87–77 against the JS Kairouan. In the 2014 final, the ES Goulettoise defeated the JS Menazah in the final. In the 2015 final, the JS Kairouan defeated Stade Nabeulien.

During the season of 2017–18, the Tunisian Basketball Federation created a new version of the Federation Cup: a tournament with three teams from the Championnat Pro A. This tour is during the qualifying phase between 8 November – 1 December 2017) of national equipment for the 2019 FIBA Basketball World Cup. The Club Africain will submit the first final version of the new version of the ES Sahel 73–70 at the Bir Challouf hall in Nabeul.

During the 2018–19 season, the Club Africain won the second edition of the new version in the final against DS Grombalia 67–65 at the Bir Challouf hall in Nabeul. This tournament pits twelve teams from the Championnat Pro A against each other without their players playing in the national team, a criterion pushing ES Radès to withdraw from the tournament (six of its players are affected). The competition takes place during the qualifying phase between 9 November and 22 December 2018 of the national teams for the 2019 World Cup.

For the third edition in 2020–21, the Tunisian Basketball Federation changed the name of the competition to the Abderraouf-Menjour Cup. Seven teams participated in this tournament between 9 December and 12 December 2020, while the Club Africain, US Monastir, ES Radès, and AS Hammamet withdrew, and the ES Sahel withdrew before its first match. Ezzahra Sports won the final against Stade Nabeulien 69–68 after the over time at the Bir Challouf hall in Nabeul.

During the 2023–24 season, the ES Sahel won the final against JS Kairouan 70–64 at the Ben Ammar Hall in La Goulette. At the end of the 2024–25 season, JS Kairouan defeated ES Sahel in the final 74–60 in La Goulette, winning the trophy for the second time.

For the 2025–26 season, the Tunisian Basketball Federation reverted to the previous format of the competition. ES Radès won the Federation Cup for the first time in its history, securing the top spot with six victories in six matches.

== Finals ==
Season	Champions	Final score	Runners-up
1995	Club Africain	?–?	Unknown
1996–1997	Not played		
1998	Club Africain	?–?	Unknown
1999–2011	Not played		
2012	US Monastir	?–?	Ezzahra Sports
2013	CA Bizertin	87–77	JS Kairouan
2014	ES Goulettoise	?–?	JS Menazah
2015	JS Kairouan	?–?	Stade Nabeulien
2016	Not played		
2017	Club Africain	73–70	ES Sahel
2018	Club Africain	67–65	DS Grombalia
2019	Not played		
2020	Ezzahra Sports	69–68 (OT)	Stade Nabeulien
2021–2022	Not played		
2023	ES Sahel	70–64	JS Kairouan
2024	Not played		
2025	JS Kairouan	74–60	ES Sahel
2026	ES Radès	74–50	ES Goulettoise

== Champions ==
=== By Team ===
Team	City	Titles	Winning years
Club Africain	Tunis	4	1995, 1998, 2017, 2018
JS Kairouan	Kairouan	2	2015, 2025
US Monastir	Monastir	1	2012
CA Bizertin	Bizerte	1	2013
ES Goulettoise	La Goulette	1	2014
Ezzahra Sports	Ezzahra	1	2020
ES Sahel	Sousse	1	2023
ES Radès	Radès	1	2026
