= 2014–15 Tunisian Men's Basketball League =

Tunisian Division I Basketball League
- Season: 2014–15
- Champions: Club Africain

The 2014–15 Tunisian Men’s Basketball League is the 60th season of Tunisia's premier professional men's basketball league. It is organized by the Fédération Tunisienne de Basketball.

== Teams ==
=== Group A ===
- Club Africain
- CA Bizertin
- EO Goulette et Kram
- Ezzahra Sports
- Gazelec Sport de Tunis
- JS Kairouan
- US Monastir

=== Group B ===
- AS Hammamet
- Club Sportif des Cheminots
- ES Radès
- Étoile du Sahel
- JS El Menzah
- Sfax Railways Sports
- Stade Nabeulien

== Regular season ==
Win: 2 points, Loss: 1 point

=== Group A ===
Pos	Team	Pts	P	W	L	PF	PA	PD	Qualification or relegation
1	Club Africain	24	12	12	0	927	690	+237	Championship Playoffs
2	US Monastir	21	12	9	3	928	857	+71	Championship Playoffs
3	JS Kairouan	18	12	6	6	834	848	–14	Championship Playoffs
4	EO Goulette et Kram	18	12	6	6	778	809	–31	Championship Playoffs
5	CA Bizertin	17	12	5	7	838	875	–37	Relegation Playoffs
6	Ezzahra Sports	16	12	4	8	758	844	–86	Relegation Playoffs
7	Gazelec Sport de Tunis	12	12	0	12	710	850	–140	Relegation Playoffs

=== Group B ===
Pos	Team	Pts	P	W	L	PF	PA	PD	Qualification or relegation
1	Étoile du Sahel	22	12	10	2	841	723	+118	Championship Playoffs
2	ES Radès	22	12	10	2	885	753	+132	Championship Playoffs
3	Stade Nabeulien	21	12	9	3	812	697	+115	Championship Playoffs
4	AS Hammamet	18	12	6	6	804	733	+71	Championship Playoffs
5	JS El Menzah	17	12	5	7	861	791	+70	Relegation Playoffs
6	Club Sportif des Cheminots	14	12	2	10	739	814	–75	Relegation Playoffs
7	Sfax Railways Sports	12	12	0	12	532	963	–431	Relegation Playoffs

== Playoffs ==
=== Championship playoff ===
Win: 2 points, Loss: 1 point
Club Africain and Étoile du Sahel started the playoff with 1 bonus point since each team won its group in regular season.

Pos	Team	Pts	P	W	L	PF	PA	PD	Qualification
1	Étoile Sportive de Radès	26	14	12	2	1105	1000	+105	Super Playoffs
2	Club Africain	24	14	9	5	1069	994	+75	Super Playoffs
3	Étoile du Sahel	24	14	9	5	1061	990	+71	Super Playoffs
4	US Monastir	21	14	7	7	1094	1040	+56	Super Playoffs
5	Stade Nabeulien	21	14	7	7	942	959	–17	
6	AS Hammamet	21	14	7	7	972	1033	–61	
7	JS Kairouan	17	14	3	11	968	1112	–144	
8	EO Goulette et Kram	16	14	2	12	962	1045	–83	

Updated to games played on 14 March 2015.
(Q)=Qualified to the phase of tournament indicated.

== Super Playoffs ==
The winner of the Championship Playoff will play against the fourth, and the second will play against the third. In the super playoffs, a team needs 2 victories to advance to the finals, in which 2 victories are needed to win the title.
Teams that secured a spot in the super playoffs are:

- Étoile Sportive de Radès (game 11 out of 14)
- Club Africain (game 11 out of 14)
- Étoile du Sahel (game 12 out of 14)
- US Monastir (game 13 out of 14)

=== Semifinals ===
==== (1) Étoile Sportive de Radès vs. (4) US Monastir ====
4 April 2015
16:00

Étoile Sportive de Radès 83, US Monastir 76
Scoring by quarter: 17–24, 22–15, 20–21, 24–16

Salle de Radès, Radès

11 April 2015
16:00

US Monastir 80, Étoile Sportive de Radès 68
Scoring by quarter: 14–16, 18–16, 24–20, 24–16

Salle de Monastir, Monastir

18 April 2015
16:15

Étoile Sportive de Radès 61, US Monastir 53
Scoring by quarter: 18–12, 19–12, 10–16, 14–13
ES Radès wins series 2-1

Salle de Radès, Radès

==== (2) Club Africain vs. (3) Étoile du Sahel ====
4 April 2015
16:00

Club Africain 66, Étoile du Sahel 65
Scoring by quarter: 13–18, 14–11, 17–18, 22–18

Salle de La Goulette, La Goulette

11 April 2015
15:00

Étoile du Sahel 74, Club Africain 84
Scoring by quarter: 27–19, 15–26, 14–22, 18–17
Club Africain wins series 2-0

Salle de Sousse, Sousse

=== Finals ===
==== Game 1 ====
2 May 2015
16:00

Étoile Sportive de Radès 61, Club Africain 63
Scoring by quarter: 11–16, 14–16, 11–14, 25–17

Salle de Radès, Radès

==== Game 2 ====
8 May 2015
16:00

Club Africain 78, Étoile Sportive de Radès 68
Scoring by quarter: 14–17, 22–12, 18–21, 24–18
Club Africain wins series 2-0

Salle de La Goulette, La Goulette
