= Mohamed El Kardani =

Egyptian basketball player and coach (born 1977)

US Monastir
- Position: Head coach
- League: BAL

Personal information
- Born: 24 April 1977 (age 49)
- Listed height: 1.96 m (6 ft 5 in)
- Listed weight: 115 kg (254 lb)

Career history

Coaching
- ?: Gezira
- 2021–2022: Al-Ittihad Jeddah
- 2022–2023: Gezira
- 2023–2024: Al-Ittihad Jeddah
- 2024–present: US Monastir

Mohamed Mounir El Kardani (Note: Sometimes romanized as Mohamed El-Kerdany.) (born 24 April 1977) is an Egyptian former basketball player and current coach. He is the current head coach of US Monastir of the Basketball Africa League (BAL). During his playing career, he played as power forward and represented the Egypt national team in international competitions.

His last team was Gezira, where he played in the 2010–11 season.

== Playing career ==
El Kardani played for the Egypt national team and played in the AfroBasket in 2007 and 2010. He also played at the under-22 World Championship in 1997, and the African Under-22 championship in 1996. During his club career he represented Sporting Alexandria, with who he played in the 2013 FIBA Africa Clubs Champions Cup, among others.

== Coaching career ==
Kardani began his coaching career with Gezira. From 2021, he coached Al-Ittihad Jeddah of the Saudi Basketball League, as well as the Saudi Arabia national team. He then returned to Gezira for 2022–23, before going back to Al Ittihad for a second stint in June 2023.

In April 2024, Kardani was hired as the new head coach of US Monastir, succeeding Adel Tlatli who left the team for personal reasons. He coached the team in the Basketball Africa League (BAL), reaching the quarter-finals in 2024.

== Head coaching record ==
=== BAL ===
Legend
Regular season	G	Games coached	W	Games won	L	Games lost	W–L %	Win–loss %
Playoffs	PG	Playoff games	PW	Playoff wins	PL	Playoff losses	PW–L %	Playoff win–loss %

Team	Year	G	W	L	W–L%	Finish	PG	PW	PL	PW–L%	Result
US Monastir	2024	6	3	3	.500	3rd in Sahara Conference	2	1	1	.500	Lost in Quarter-finals
