= Anis Hedidane =

Tunisian basketball player

Medal record

Men's basketball

Representing Tunisia

FIBA Africa Championship
Bronze medal – third place	2009 Libya	Tunisia

Anis Hedidane (born November 9, 1986) is a Tunisian professional basketball player. He plays at the shooting guard position.

== Pro career ==
Hedidane has played pro club basketball with Stade Nabeulien in the Tunisian Basketball League.

== Tunisian national team ==
Hedidane is a member of the senior men's Tunisian national basketball team. He made his debut for the senior team as a 22-year-old at the 2009 FIBA Africa Championship. He saw action in eight of Tunisia's nine games, who earned the bronze medal, and its first ever trip to the FIBA World Championship.
