= Tunisian Basketball Super Cup =

- Organising body: Tunisia Basketball Federation
- Founded: 2003; 23 years ago
- First season: 2003
- Country: Tunisia
- Confederation: FIBA Africa
- Current champions: Club Africain (5th titles) (2025)
- Most championships: Club Africain (5 titles)

The Tunisian Basketball Super Cup or Champions Trophy, is an annual basketball super cup in Tunisian men's basketball opposing the Championnat Pro A champion to the winner of the Tunisian Cup (or the vice-champion if the champion is also the winner of the Tunisian Cup). The tournament is organised by the Tunisia Basketball Federation (FTBB). The current champion is Club Africain, who won the title in the 2025.

== History ==
During the first edition of the Tunisian Super Cup in 2003, Club Africain won the title against JS Kairouan. In the 2004 Tunisian Super Cup, Club Africain won the title again against Stade Nabeulien. In October 2005, JS Kairouan won the Tunisian Super Cup against US Monastir at the Sousse Indoor Sports Hall. On 10 January 2015, Club Africain won the 2014 edition final against ES Sahel 78–73 at the El Menzah Sports Palace. The 2015 Super Cup between Club Africain and ES Sahel was canceled due to a lack of sponsors. The 2016 edition between the same two clubs was again canceled due to a busy schedule.

The 2019 Tunisian Super Cup between the US Monastir and ES Radès, originally scheduled for 11 April 2020, at the Palais des sports Marcel-Cerdan in Paris, was postponed due to COVID-19 pandemic and ultimately canceled. On 10 March 2024, Club Africain won the 2023 Tunisian Super Cup against the US Monastir 68–48 at the Salle Omnisport de Radès. On 21 December 2024, the US Monastir defeated Club Africain 64–60 in the final at the Salle Omnisport de Radès. On 20 December 2025, Club Africain won the Tunisian Super Cup final against US Monastir 72–64, Omar Abada was the best player of the match.

== Finals ==
Season	Date	Champions	Final score	Runners-up
2003	Unknown	Club Africain	?–?	JS Kairouan
2004	Unknown	Club Africain	?–?	Stade Nabeulien
2005	Unknown	JS Kairouan	?–?	US Monastir
2006–2013	Not played			
2014	10 January 2015	Club Africain	78–73	ES Sahel
2015–2022	Not played			
2023	10 March 2024	Club Africain	68–48	US Monastir
2024	21 December 2024	US Monastir	64–60	Club Africain
2025	20 December 2025	Club Africain	72–64	US Monastir

== Champions ==
=== By Team ===
Team	City	Titles	Winning years
Club Africain	Tunis	5	2003, 2004, 2014, 2023, 2025
JS Kairouan	Kairouan	1	2005
US Monastir	Monastir	1	2024
