= Radhouane Slimane =

Tunisian basketball player (born 1980)

Free agent
- Position: Power forward
- League: iraqi Basketball League

Personal information
- Born: 16 August 1980 (age 46) Kairouan, Tunisia
- Listed height: 2.05 m (6 ft 9 in)
- Listed weight: 120 kg (265 lb)

Career information
- Playing career: 1998–present

Career history
- 1998–2004: JS Kairouan
- 2005–2006: Barreirense
- 2006–2007: Al Shabab Dubai
- 2008–2009: Sharjah
- 2009–2010: Al-Nasr Dubai
- 2010–2011: Sharjah
- 2011: →ES Sahel
- 2012–2013: Al-Hilal Riyadh
- 2013–2014: Baniyas Club
- 2014: →US Monastir
- 2014–2015: Al Wasl
- 2015–2018: ES Sahel
- 2018–2023: US Monastir
- 2019: →JS Kairouan
- 2020: →AS Salé
- 2020: Dynamo Lebanon
- 2023–2024: Sagesse SC
- 2024: Al-Difaa Al-Jawi SC

Career highlights
- BAL champion (2022); All-BAL First Team (2022); 9× Tunisian League champion (2001, 2002, 2003, 2011, 2019–2023); Tunisian League MVP (2023); 8× Tunisian Cup winner (2002, 2005, 2011, 2016, 2020–2023); 2× Arab Club Championship winner (2015, 2016); Maghreb Championship (2003); Tunisian Cup Final MVP (2022); iraq Basketball League Winner (2024); iraq Basketball League Final Mvp (2024)
Medals
Men's basketball
Representing Tunisia
AfroBasket
Gold medal – first place	2011 Madagascar
Gold medal – first place	2017 Tunisia/Senegal
Gold medal – first place	2021 Rwanda

Radhouane Slimane (born 16 August 1980) is a Tunisian former basketball player. Standing at 2.05 m (6 ft 8 1/2 in), and nicknamed "Sekka" in the Tunisian basketball scene, Slimane mainly played as power forward.

Born in Kairouan, he started out his career playing six seasons with his hometown team JS Kairouan. Slimane then played in Portugal, the United Arab Emirates as well as other Arab countries. He spent significant time with ES Sahel before signing with US Monastir. He captained Monastir to their first BAL championship in 2022.

Slimane played for the Tunisia national basketball team during his career, winning three AfroBasket tournaments in 2011, 2017 and 2021.

== Early life ==
Slimane was born in Kairouan, a city in which basketball is very popular and picked up the sport at a young age. After succeeding in the junior level, he joined JS Kariouan's senior team that plays in the Championnat Pro A.

== Career ==
Slimane has played for several teams in his ten-year basketball career, including stops in Portugal, Saudi Arabia, the United Arab Emirates, and his native Tunisia. He is known for his rough, physical style of play.

Slimane is a member of the Tunisia national basketball team and made his most recent appearance at the 2010 FIBA World Championship. Prior to that, he competed at the 2007 FIBA Africa Championship before having a fallout with the Tunisian Federation. Shortly before the 2010 World Championship, he made amends with the Federation and joined the team in Turkey.

In September 2018, Slimane signed a 2-year contract with US Monastir for a second stint with the team. He led Monastir to their first-ever BAL championship in the 2022, and was named to the All-BAL First Team following a season in which he averaged 14.4 points per game.

On 3 October 2023, Slimane joined Sagesse Club for the 2023-24 season.

He announced his retirement in July 2026 at age 45.

== National team career ==
When playing for JS Kairouan, scouts noticed his talent and subsequently Slimane played with the Tunisia senior team at 2001 FIBA Africa Championship at age 21. At the 2001 tournament, Tunisia lost to Algeria in the semi-finals. In the 2005 and 2007 Afrobasket tournaments, Slimane was the leading scorer. He missed the 2009 tournament due to issues with the national federation. At AfroBasket 2011, Slimane and Tunisia won their first gold medal. Slimane then played with Tunisia at the 2012 Summer Olympics in London.

Slimane missed the 2015 Afrobasket after he left the team three days ahead of the tournament due to a disagreement with the head coach.

He won a second gold medal at AfroBasket 2017 and another medal at AfroBasket 2021.

== Coaching career ==
Slimane made his coaching debut in July 2024, as he was on the Miami Heat's coaching staff as assistant during the 2024 NBA Summer League, and won the championship of the exhibition tournament.

== Awards and accomplishments ==
=== Club ===
JS Kairouan

- 3× Championnat National A: (2001, 2002, 2003)
- 2× Tunisian Cup: (2002, 2005)
- Maghreb Championship: (2003)

ES Sahel

- Championnat National A: (2011)
- 2× Arab Club Basketball Championship: (2015, 2016)
- 2× Tunisian Cup: (2011, 2016)

US Monastir

- Basketball Africa League: (2022)
- 4× Championnat National A: (2019, 2020, 2021, 2022)
- 3× Tunisian Cup: (2020, 2021, 2022)

=== National team ===
Tunisia

- AfroBasket: (gold) Gold medal in 2011, 2017, 2021

=== Individual ===
- All-BAL First Team: (2022)
- Tunisian Cup Final MVP: (2022)
- Championnat National A Best Forward of the Season: (2019)

== BAL career statistics ==
Legend
GP	Games played	GS	Games started	MPG	Minutes per game
FG%	Field goal percentage	3P%	3-point field goal percentage	FT%	Free throw percentage
RPG	Rebounds per game	APG	Assists per game	SPG	Steals per game
BPG	Blocks per game	PPG	Points per game	**Bold**	Career high
†	Won an BAL championship

Year	Team	GP	GS	MPG	FG%	3P%	FT%	RPG	APG	SPG	BPG	PPG
2021	Monastir	6	6	22.4	**.488**	**.481**	.818	4.0	2.7	.5	.0	10.3
2022†	Monastir	**8**	**8**	**31.0**	.424	.294	**.903**	5.0	**3.9**	**1.1**	**.6**	**14.4**
2023	Monastir	5	5	28.9	.304	.207	.889	**5.4**	1.6	1.0	.2	10.0
