= Championnat Nationale 1 (Tunisia) =

Tunisian basketball league

- Organising body: Tunisia Basketball Federation
- Founded: 1955; 71 years ago
- First season: 1955–56
- Country: Tunisia
- Confederation: FIBA Africa
- Number of teams: 12
- Level on pyramid: 2
- Promotion to: Championnat Pro A
- Relegation to: Championnat Nationale 2
- Current champions: Stade Nabeulien (2024–25)

The Championnat Nationale 1, is the second tier professional basketball league in Tunisia, established in 1955. As the 2025–26 season, the league features 12 teams. The league is organised by the Tunisia Basketball Federation (FTBB). The highest-placed teams are promoted to the Championnat Pro A.

== Format ==
The Championnat Nationale 1 is played in the following system:

1. Preliminary round: the eighteen teams are divided in two groups of nine and play each other home and away.
2. Play-offs: the four highest placed teams from the preliminary round play each other home and away.
3. Super Play-off: the four highest teams from the play-offs play in the semi-finals and finals which are best-of-three series.
4. Play-out: the teams ranked 5th to 9th play each other home and away.

== Teams ==
=== 2025–26 teams ===
The following 12 teams are the teams for the 2025–26 season:

Club	City
AS Marsa	La Marsa
Avenir Mégrine Sport	Mégrine
Bardo Sport	Le Bardo
CA Bizerte	Bizerte
CS National Guard	Ariana
CS Hammam-Lif	Hammam-Lif
CS Hammam Sousse	Hammam Sousse
CB M'saken	M'saken
CS Sfaxien	Sfax
Ezzahra Sports	Ezzahra
JA Bougatfa	Tunis
SS Sfax	Sfax

== Champions ==
=== By Year ===
- 1955–56:
- 1956–57:
- 1957–58:
- 1958–59: ES Tunis
- 1959–60:
- 1960–61:
- 1961–62:
- 1962–63:
- 1963–64:
- 1964–65:
- 1965–66:
- 1966–67: CA GAS
- 1967–68:
- 1968–69:
- 1969–70:
- 1970–71:
- 1971–72:
- 1972–73: CA GAS
- 1973–74: CS Hammam-Lif
- 1974–75: CA GAS
- 1975–76: CS Hammam-Lif
- 1976–77:
- 1977–78:
- 1978–79:
- 1979–80:
- 1980–81:
- 1981–82:
- 1982–83:
- 1983–84:
- 1984–85:
- 1985–86:
- 1986–87:
- 1987–88:
- 1988–89:
- 1989–90:
- 1990–91:
- 1991–92:
- 1992–93:
- 1993–94:
- 1994–95:
- 1995–96:
- 1996–97:
- 1997–98:
- 1998–99:
- 1999–00:
- 2000–01:
- 2001–02:
- 2002–03:
- 2003–04:
- 2004–05:
- 2005–06:
- 2006–07:
- 2007–08:
- 2008–09: CS Hammam-Lif
- 2009–10:
- 2010–11:
- 2011–12: CS Hammam-Lif
- 2012–13: Tunis Air Club
- 2013–14: Sfax RS
- 2014–15: DS Grombalia
- 2015–16: Stade Gabèsien
- 2016–17: ES Tunis
- 2017–18: CA Bizerte
- 2018–19: Stade Gabèsien
- 2019–20: Ezzahra Sports
- 2020–21: SS Sfaxien
- 2021–22: ES Sahel
- 2022–23: ES Goulettoise
- 2023–24: BC Mahdia
- 2024–25: Stade Nabeulien
