= Ridha Charfeddine =

Tunisian politician and sportsmanager

Ridha Charfeddine (born 2 July 1952) is a Tunisian politician and football executive. He has been a member of the Assembly of the Representatives of the People since October 2014.

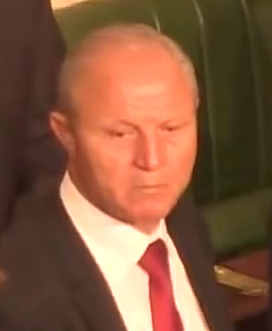
Charfeddine in 2014

== Career ==
Charfeddine was born in Sousse on 2 July 1952. He has been chairman of Étoile Sportive du Sahel since 4 May 2012.

In the October 2014 parliamentary elections he was elected to the Assembly of the Representatives of the People for Nidaa Tounes.

On 8 October 2015 Charfeddine survived an assassination attempt near Sousse when the car he was travelling in was shot at various times.
