= Tunisia Basketball Federation =

- Sport: Basketball
- Founded: 28 October 1960
- President: Sofien Jribi
- No. of teams: 53 clubs
- Country: Tunisia
- Continent: Africa
- Website: Official website

The Tunisia Basketball Federation (Arabic: الجامعة التونسية لكرة السلة,) is the governing body of basketball in Tunisia. It established on 28 October 1960. that was Formed in 1956, it is based in the capital town Tunis. The FTBB is a member of the FIBA and also belong to the FIBA Africa zone.

On 10 August 2025, Sofien Jribi was elected president of the federation, succeeding Ali Benzarti, who had served for 19 years.

== Competitions ==
Competition	Year	Champions	Runners-up	Next edition
Senior (Men's)
Championnat Pro A	2025–26	US Monastir	JS Kairouan	2026–27
Tunisian Basketball Cup	2025–26	Club Africain	US Monastir	2026–27
Tunisian Basketball Super Cup	2025	Club Africain	US Monastir	TBD
Tunisian Basketball Federation Cup	2026	ES Radès		TBD
Senior (Women's)
Tunisian Women's Division I	2025–26	CS Sfaxien	ES Cap Bon	2026–27
Tunisian Women's Basketball Cup	2025–26	CS Sfaxien	ASF Jemmal	2026–27
Tunisian Women's Basketball Super Cup	2025	ASF Jemmal	CS Sfaxien	TBD

== Presidents ==
- 1955–1956: Antoine Olivieri
- 1956–1958: Hassine Harrouche
- 1958–1959: Mohamed Mehrezi
- 1959–1962: Mohamed Salah
- 1962–1963: Abdellatif Rassaâ
- 1963–1965: Hassine Harrouche
- 1965–1971: Morched Ben Ali
- 1971–1972: Hassine Harrouche
- 1972–1975: Abdeljawad Mzoughi
- 1975–1977: Morched Ben Ali
- 1977–1980: Mohamed Boudamgha
- 1980–1982: Ahmed Majbour
- 1982–1991: Abderraouf Menjour
- 1991–1993: Mustapha Kamel Fourti
- 1993–1995: Abderraouf Menjour
- 1995–1998: Rafik Dey Daly
- 1998–2005: Mahmoud Bedoui
- 2006–2025: Ali Benzarti
- 2025: Marouane Chaieb (interim)
- 2025–present: Sofien Jribi

== Men's structure ==
Pyramidal structure of basketball leagues in Tunisia for the 2025–26 season
Level	League system
1	Championnat Pro A 12 teams
2	Championnat Nationale 1; 12 teams
