= Lukas Wank =

German basketball player (born 1997)

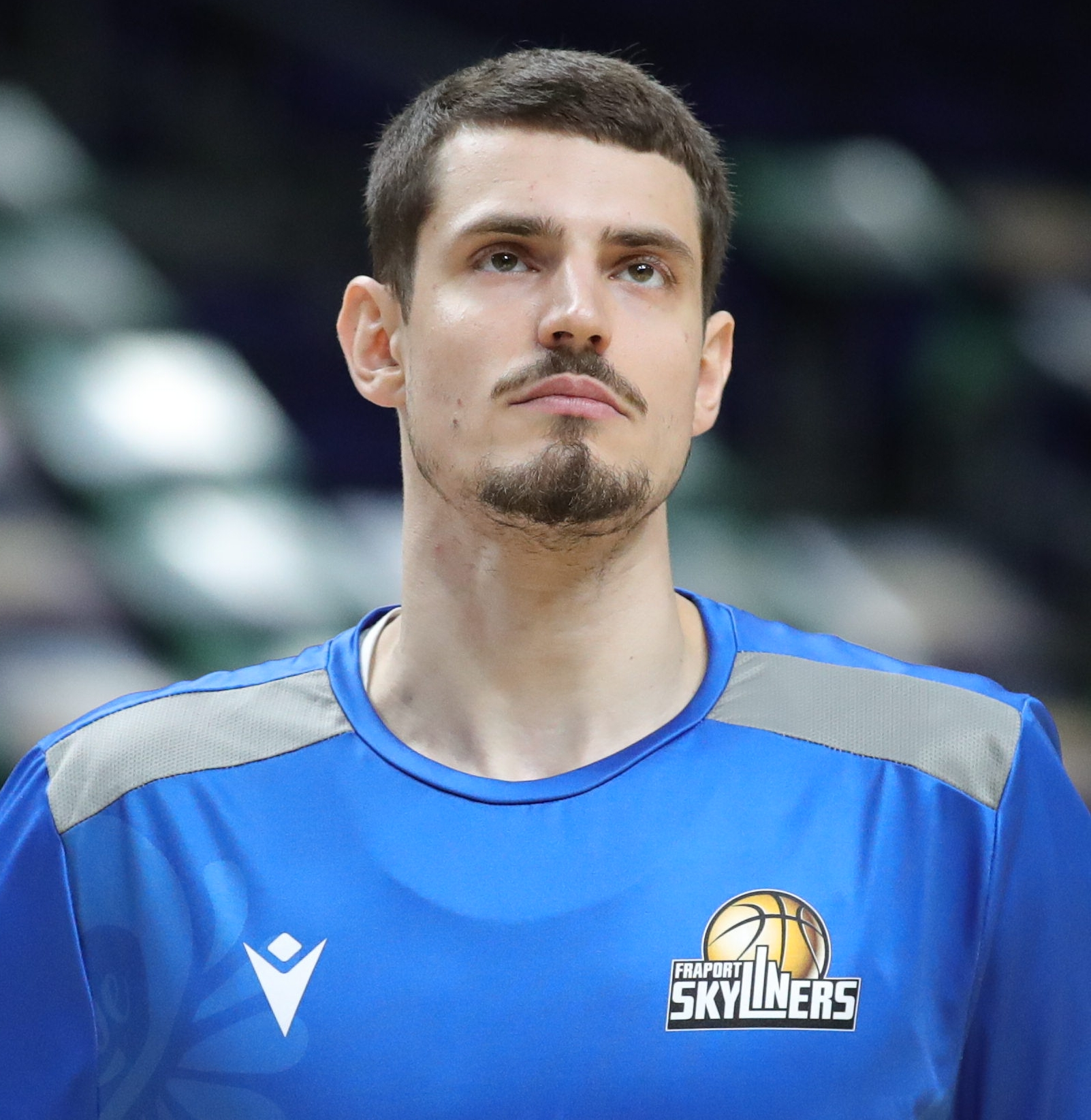
- Wank with Skyliners Frankfurt in January 2023

Personal information
- Born: 19 January 1997 (age 29) Altenburg, Germany
- Listed height: 6 ft 6 in (1.98 m)
- Listed weight: 200 lb (91 kg)

Career information
- Playing career: 2014–present
- Position: Small forward

Career history
- 2014–2016: Science City Jena
- 2016–2017: s.Oliver Würzburg
- 2016–2017: → TG Würzburg
- 2017–2018: RheinStars Köln
- 2018–2019: Niners Chemnitz
- 2019–2021: Löwen Braunschweig
- 2021–2023: Skyliners Frankfurt
- 2023–2024: Baskets Oldenburg
- 2024–2025: Würzburg Baskets

Lukas Nathanael Christian Wank (born 19 January 1997) is a German basketball player.

== Professional career ==
Having played his entire professional career in his native Germany, Lukas Wank started in 2014 with Science City Jena.

On July 5, 2016, he signed with s.Oliver Würzburg of the Basketball Bundesliga.

On October 8, 2017, he signed with RheinStars Köln of the ProA.

On May 29, 2018, he signed with Niners Chemnitz of the ProA.

On June 24, 2019, he signed with Löwen Braunschweig of the Basketball Bundesliga.

On July 6, 2021, he signed with Skyliners Frankfurt of the Basketball Bundesliga.

On June 18, 2024, he signed with Würzburg Baskets of the Basketball Bundesliga (BBL). In 2025 he terminated his contract with Würzburg as he will move to Brazil for personal reasons.

== National team career ==
At the U18 European Championships in 2015, Wank reached the quarter-finals with the German national team. In May 2017 he was called up to the U20 -national team. At the U20 European Championships in the summer of 2017, he came seventh overall with the German team and scored an average of 3.1 Points per match. In 2019 he was called up to the A2 national team and with this in July 2019 he took part in the Summer Universiade in Naples in fifth place. In February 2020 he was in the extended squad of the senior national team for the first time. Wank played his first senior international match in June 2021 against the Czech Republic. The following month he contributed to the German team's qualification for the Olympic Games in Tokyo, and played in two games when the Olympics finally took place in 2021. Wank was used in two games in the Men's tournament at the Olympics.
