= AS Hammamet =

- Nickname: ASH
- Leagues: Championnat Pro A
- Founded: 1945; 81 years ago
- Arena: Salle d'Hammamet
- Capacity: 2,500
- Location: Hammamet, Tunisia

AS Hammamet, is a Tunisian basketball club based in Hammamet. Established in 1945, the team currently plays in the Championnat National B, the second national tier.

In 2013, the club was runner-up in the Arab Club Basketball Championship.

== Honours ==
Arab Championship

- Runners-up (1): 2017
