= US Monastir (basketball) =

Basketball club in Tunisia

Union Sportive Monastirienne
- 2024–25 US Monastir basketball season
- Nickname: Blue Empire; USM
- Leagues: Championnat Pro A BAL
- Founded: 1923; 103 years ago
- History: US Monastir; 1923–present
- Arena: Mohamed-Mzali Sports Hall
- Capacity: 5,000
- Location: Monastir, Tunisia
- Team colors: Blue and white
- President: Moslem Slama
- Team captain: Ghayeza Mokhtar
- Championships: 1 BAL; 10 Tunisian League; 6 Tunisian Cup; 1 Tunisian Federation Cup; 1 Tunisian Super Cup
- Website: usmonastir.org.tn
Home	Away

Union Sportive Monastirienne (Arabic: الاتحاد الرياضي المنستيري), commonly known as US Monastir, is a Tunisian professional basketball club based in Monastir. Established in 1959, the team plays in the Pro A the first division league in Tunisia and has won ten national championships. USMonastir also plays in the Basketball Africa League (BAL) since the inaugural season in 2021. Home games are played in the Mohamed-Mzali Sports Hall.

US Monastir has won ten Tunisian Leagues and six Tunisian Cups. US Monastir won the BAL championship in 2022, becoming the first and only Tunisian team to win the competition until the present.

== History ==
The club was established in 1923 and won its first Tunisian League title in 1998 after defeating Ezzahra Sports in the league finals. As the national champions, USMonastir played in the Arab Club Basketball Championship where it lost all three group stage games. In the 1999–2000 season, USMonastir won its first-ever double after winning both the league and cup title. USMonastir beat Club Africain in the league final and Ezzahra in the cup final (66–61). In 2005, USMonastir won its third Tunisian championship, defeating Stade Nabeulien 66–51. The first international title for USMonastir arrived in 2012, when they won the Maghreb Basketball Championship after defeating ES Radès in the final. In 2014, USMonastir made its debut in the FIBA Africa Club Championship, Africa's top continental league, for the first time. In 2017, the club ended at third place in the continental league. In 2019, USMonastir won its fourth Tunisian championship defeating ES Rades. Again in 2020 USMonastir won its fifth Tunisian championship and the second in row defeating the same ES Rades. In 2021, USMonastir defeated Ezzahra Sports in the Tunisian finals and won its sixth championship, and the third in a row.

In 2021, USMonastir was one of the twelve teams to play in the new Basketball Africa League (BAL) as they qualified as Tunisian national champions. In the inaugural season of the league, USMonastir reached the Finals where it lost to Zamalek despite being favourites in the competition. Three players of USMonastir (Omar Abada, Makrem Ben Romdhane and Wael Arakji) were named to the All-BAL First Team. In the following season, the 2021–22 season, USMonastir won the national double after capturing the CNA and Tunisian Cup titles. On 28 May 2022, USMonastir won its first-ever BAL and African championship after defeating Petro de Luanda in the 2022 BAL Finals, becoming the first Tunisian team to win the BAL. Point guard Michael Dixon was named the league's MVP; Ater Majok and Radhouane Slimane were named to the All-BAL First Team. Representing the African continent, USMonastir played in the 2023 edition of the FIBA Intercontinental Cup, where it finished in fourth place after losing to the Spanish team CB Canarias and the American team Rio Grande Valley Vipers.

In the 2023 BAL season, USMonastir brought back coach Perišić three days before the tournament. However, USMonastir was unable to qualify for the playoffs as the team ended with a 3–2 record and was ranked fifth based on a tiebreaker. USMonastir began the 2023–24 season with Adel Tlatli as head coach, but hired Mohamed Kardani in April 2024.

== Arenas ==
Since its opening on 6 April 2006, USMonastir plays its home games in the Mohamed-Mzali Sports Hall, which has a capacity of 5,000 people.

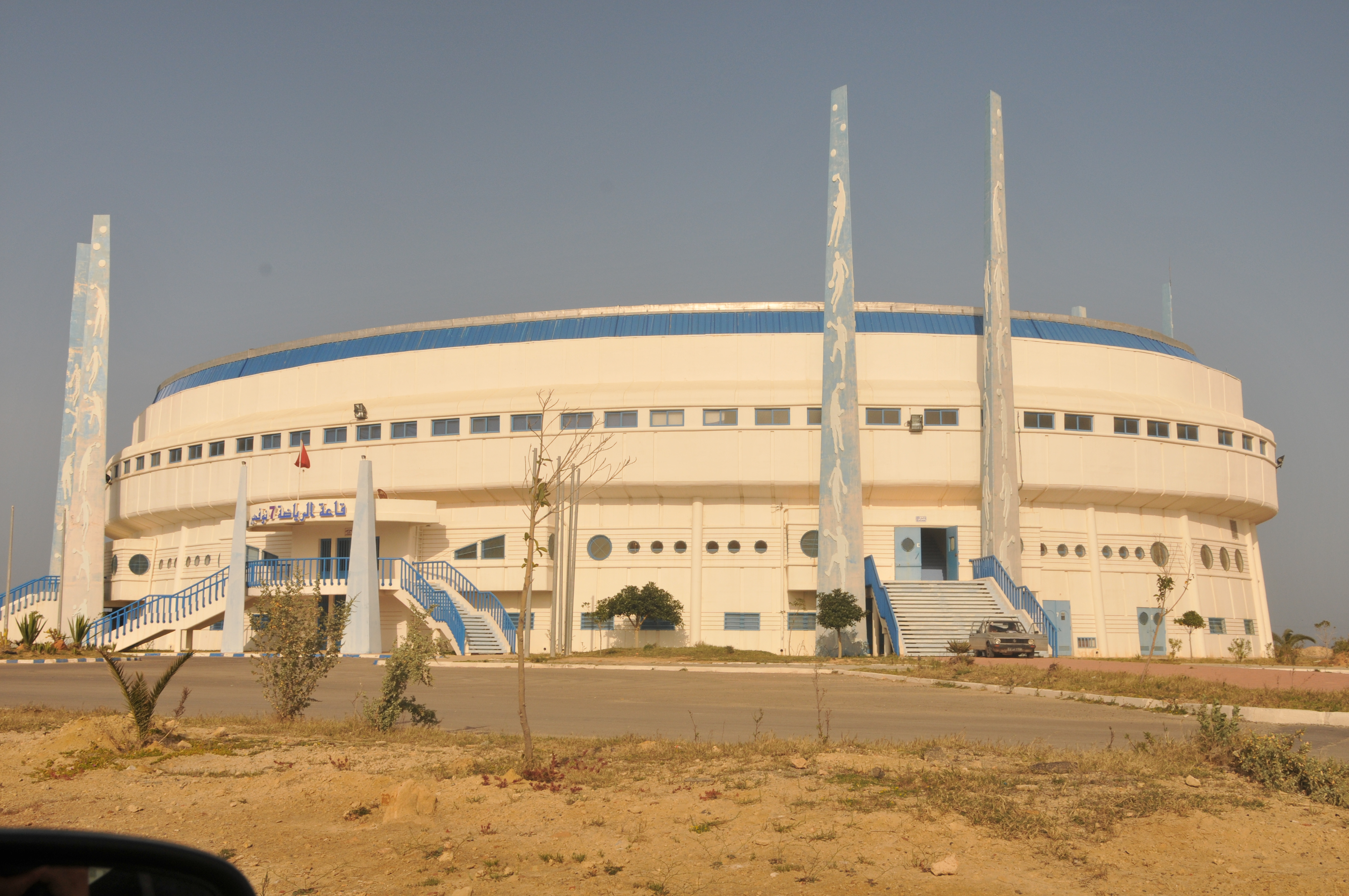

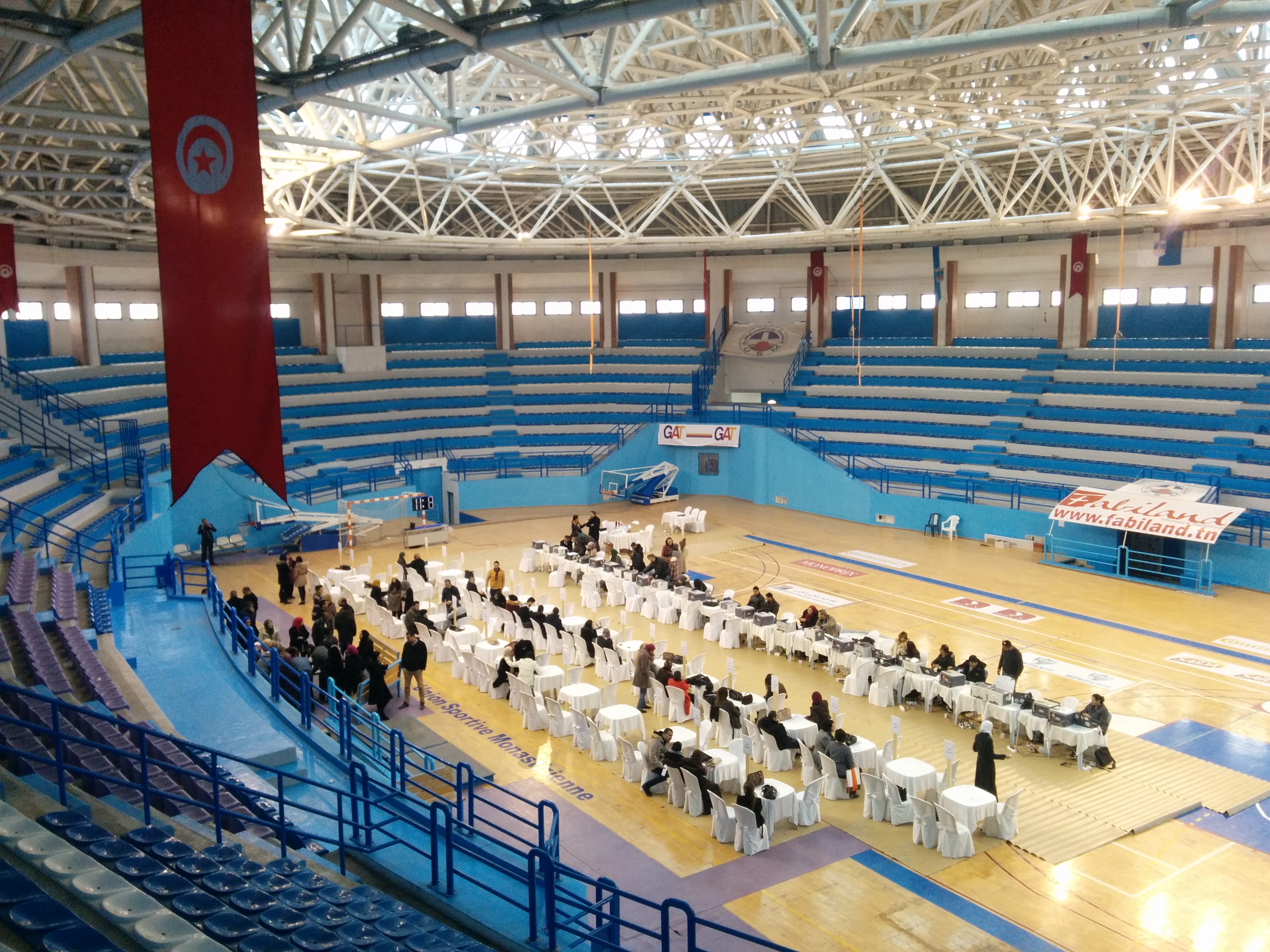

== Players ==
=== Current roster ===
Note: Flags indicate national team eligibility at FIBA-sanctioned events. Players may hold other non-FIBA nationalities not displayed.

2023–24 US Monastir roster
Players
Coaches

Pos.	No.	Nat.	Name	Ht.	Age
G	00	(Tunisia)	Bouallegue, Amrou	1.94 m (6 ft 4 in)	30 – 24 December 1995
G	1	(United States)	Crawford, Chris (I)	1.94 m (6 ft 4 in)	34 – 30 September 1992
G	2	(Tunisia)	Ganouni, Achraf	1.92 m (6 ft 4 in)	29 – 16 April 1997
C	4	(Tunisia)	Ghyaza, Mokhtar (C)	2.04 m (6 ft 8 in)	39 – 15 November 1986
G	5	(Tunisia)	Marmouch, Yassine	1.95 m (6 ft 5 in)	23 – 1 June 2003
SF	7	(Tunisia)	Marnaoui, Oussama	1.96 m (6 ft 5 in)	27 – 16 June 1999
SG	10	(Tunisia)	Chouaya, Lassaad	1.90 m (6 ft 3 in)	37 – 22 August 1989
G	12	(Tunisia)	Bedoui, Ahmed	1.98 m (6 ft 6 in)	19 – 28 July 2007
C	13	(South Sudan)	Majok, Ater (I)	2.10 m (6 ft 11 in)	39 – 4 July 1987
G	14	(United States)	Williams II, George (I)	1.95 m (6 ft 5 in)	36 – 16 April 1990
F	15	(Tunisia)	Addami, Ahmed	1.88 m (6 ft 2 in)	29 – 14 July 1997
F	23	(Tunisia)	Lahyani, Firas	2.01 m (6 ft 7 in)	35 – 16 July 1991
SF	24	(Mali)	Doucouré, Sadio (I)	2.01 m (6 ft 7 in)	34 – 27 July 1992

Head coach

- (Egypt) Mohamed El Kardani

Assistant coach(es)

- (Tunisia) M'hamed Gaddour

Legend

- (C) Team captain
- (I) Import player
- (E): BAL Elevate player
- Injured

- Roster
Updated: 4 May 2024

=== Past rosters ===
- 2021 BAL season
- 2022 BAL season
- 2023 BAL season

=== Notable players ===
Note: Flags indicate national team eligibility at FIBA-sanctioned events. Players may hold other non-FIBA nationalities not displayed.

Criteria

To appear in this section a player must have either:

- Set a club record or won an individual award while at the club
- Played at least one official international match for their national team at any time
- Played at least one official NBA match at any time.

- (France) mohamed taha gheriani (1 seasons: '26–'now)
- (Tunisia) khalil hadj massoud (1 seasons: '25–'now)
- (Tunisia) yassin ghedira (4 seasons: '21–'25)
- (Tunisia) Omar Abada (2 seasons: '19–'21)
- (Tunisia) Makrem Ben Romdhane (1 season: '20–'21)
- (Tunisia) Radhouane Slimane (3 seasons: '14, '20-)
- (Tunisia) Michael Roll (1 season: '23)
- (Lebanon) Wael Arakji (1 season: '21)
- (Kenya) Tom Wamukota (1 season: '19-'20)
- (United States Virgin Islands) Walter Hodge (1 season: '20)
- (South Sudan) Ater Majok (2 seasons: '20-'22)
- (Ivory Coast) Solo Diabate (1 season: '21-'22)

=== Individual awards ===
Tunisian Cup MVP
- Firas Lahyani – 2017
- Omar Abada – 2020, 2021
- Radhouane Slimane – 2022
- Oussama Marnaoui – 2023

All-BAL First Team

- Omar Abada – 2021
- Wael Arakji – 2021
- Makrem Ben Romdhane – 2021
- Radhouane Slimane – 2022
- Ater Majok – 2022

BAL Defensive Player of the Year

- Ater Majok – 2022

BAL All-Defensive Team

- Ater Majok – 2022

BAL Sportsmanship Award

- Makrem Ben Romdhane – 2021

== Honours ==
=== National ===
- Championnat Pro A

Champions (10): 1997–98, 1999–2000, 2004–05, 2018–19, 2019–20, 2020–21, 2021–22, 2022–23, 2023–24, 2025–26
Runner-up (2): 2017–18, 2024–25

- Tunisian Basketball Cup

Champions (6): 1999–2000, 2019–20, 2020–21, 2021–22, 2022–23, 2024–25
Runner-up (10): 1991–92, 1997–98, 1998–99, 2000–01, 2004–05, 2014–15, 2015–16, 2016–17, 2018–19, 2023–24

- Tunisian Basketball Super Cup

Champions (1): 2024
Runner-up (2): 2005, 2023, 2025

- Tunisian Basketball Federation Cup

Champion (1): 2012

=== International ===
- Basketball Africa League

Champion (1): 2022
Runner-up (1): 2021

- FIBA Africa Clubs Champions Cup

Third place (1): 2017

- Arab Club Basketball Championship

Third place (1): 2019

- Maghreb Championship

Champion (1): 2012

- FIBA Intercontinental Cup

Fourth Place (1): 2023

== Season by season ==
=== Overall (2018–present) ===
Season	Tier	League	Regular season					Playoffs	Tunisian Cup	International competitions		Head coach
Season	Tier	League	Finish	Played	Wins	Losses	Win%	Playoffs	Tunisian Cup	League	Result	Head coach
US Monastir
2018–19	1	CNA	2nd	14	10	4	.714	Champions	Finalist	DNQ		Said El Bouzidi
2019–20	1	CNA	1st	19	18	1	.947	Champions	Winner	N/A		Miodrag Perišić
2020–21	1	CNA	1st	14	12	2	.857	Champions	Winner	BAL	Runner-up	Safouane Ferjani Mounir Ben Slimane
2021–22	1	CNA	2nd	18	13	5	.722	Champions	Winner	BAL	Champions	Toni Vujanic Miodrag Perišić
2022–23	1	CNA	1st	19	18	1	.947	Champions	Winner	BAL	Regular Season	Marouan Kechrid Linos Gavriel
2023–24	1	CNA	1st	18	18	0	1.000	Champions	Runners-up	BAL	Quarterfinalist	Adel Tlatli Mohamed Kirdani

=== BAL (2021–present) ===
BAL champions	Conference champions	Playoff berth

Season	League		Regular season				Postseason	Head coach	Captain
Season	League	Conference	Finish	Wins	Losses	Win %	Postseason	Head coach	Captain
US Monastir
2021	BAL	Group A	1st	3	0	1.000	Won quarterfinals (Douanes) 86–62; Won semifinals (Patriots) 87–46; Lost finals (Zamalek) 63–76	Mounir Ben Slimane	Radhouane Slimane
2022	BAL	Sahara	2nd	4	1	.800	Won quarterfinals (Cape Town) 106–67; Won semifinals (Zamalek) 88–81; Won finals (Petro) 83–72	Miodrag Perišić	Radhouane Slimane
2023	BAL	Sahara	4th	3	2	.600	Did not qualify	Miodrag Perišić	Radhouane Slimane
2024	BAL	Sahara	3rd	3	3	.500	Won seeding game (Petro) 70–67; Lost quarterfinals (Hoopers) 88–92	Mohamed Kirdani	Mokhtar Ghyaza
2025	BAL	Sahara	1st	4	2	.667	Won seeding game (Hoopers) 89–81; Lost quarterfinals (Petro) 84–95	Vasco Curado	Radhouane Slimane
Regular season record				17	8	.680	1 BAL championship		
Playoffs record				7	3	.700	1 BAL championship		

== Head coaches ==
The following people have been head coach of US Monastir (since 2009):

- (Tunisia) Adel Tlatli (1991–1993)
- (Tunisia) Adel Tlatli (1994–1995)
- (Romania) Costel Cernat (2009)
- (Tunisia) Walid Gharbi
- (Tunisia) Safouane Ferjani
- (Tunisia) Monoom Aoun (2015–2016)
- (Greece) George Ketselidis (2016–2017)
- (Serbia) Željko Zečević (2017–2018)
- (Tunisia) Ridha Labidi (2018)
- (Morocco) Said El Bouzidi (2018–2019)
- (Serbia) Miodrag Perišić (2019–2020)
- (Tunisia) Walid Zrida (2020)
- (Tunisia) Safouane Ferjani (2020–2021)
- (Tunisia) Mounir Ben Slimane (2021)
- (Serbia) Toni Vujanic (2021–2022)
- (Serbia) Miodrag Perišić (2022)
- (Tunisia) Marouan Kechrid (2022)
- (Cyprus) Linos Gavriel (2022–?)
- (Serbia) Miodrag Perišić (2023)
- (Serbia) Miloš Gligorijević (2023)
- (Tunisia) Adel Tlatli (2023–2024)
- (Egypt) Mohamed El Kardani (2024–2025)
- (Portugal) Vasco Curado (2025–present)
