= Championnat Pro A =

Tunisian basketball league

- Organising body: Tunisia Basketball Federation
- Founded: 1955; 71 years ago
- First season: 1955–56
- Country: Tunisia
- Confederation: FIBA Africa
- Number of teams: 12
- Level on pyramid: 1
- Relegation to: Championnat Nationale 1
- Domestic cup(s): Tunisian Cup; Tunisian Federation Cup
- Supercup: Tunisian Super Cup
- International cup: Basketball Africa League
- Current champions: US Monastir (10th title) (2025–26)
- Most championships: ES Radès (13 titles)

The Championnat Pro A, is the highest tier professional basketball league in Tunisia, established in 1955. As the 2025–26 season, the league features 12 teams. The league is organised by the Tunisia Basketball Federation (FTBB).

ES Radès is the record holder for most titles, with a total of thirteen. The current champion is US Monastir, who won the title in the 2025–26 season. The champions of each Championnat Pro A season qualify directly for the Basketball Africa League (BAL).

== Format ==
Each league season of the Pro A usually starts in the end of September or beginning of October, and has the following format:

1. Preliminary round: All teams compete in two-legged matches. The six highest-ranked teams advance to the title round, while the remaining teams advance to the relegation round.
2. Second phase:
  1. Play-offs: Six teams compete again in two-legged matches, with the top four qualifying for the Super Playoffs.
  2. Play-outs: The remaining teams compete in two-legged matches. The last-ranked team relegated to Championnat Nationale 1. The remaining teams continue in the play-outs.
3. Super Playoffs: The four remaining teams compete in a best-of-three knockout stage. The winners of the final are declared champions.
4. Super Play-outs: The first, second, and third-place teams from the play-outs face the fifth and sixth-place teams from the play-offs. The sixth-placed team in the Super Play-out is also relegated to the Championnat Nationale 1.

== Teams ==
Locations of teams for the 2025–26 Championnat Pro A teams

=== 2025–26 teams ===
The following 12 teams are the teams for the 2025–26 season:

Club	City	Arena	Capacity
AS Hammamet	Hammamet	Hammamet Indoor Sports Hall	2,500
BC Mahdia	Mahdia	Rached-Khouja Indoor Hall	2,000
Club Africain	Tunis	Chérif-Bellamine Indoor Hall	2,500
DS Grombalia	Grombalia	Grombalia Indoor Hall	1,400
ES Goulettoise	La Goulette	La Goulette Indoor Hall	1,800
ES Radès	Radès	Taoufik-Bouhima Indoor Hall	3,500
ES Sahel	Sousse	Sousse Indoor Sports Hall	5,000
JS Kairouan	Kairouan	Aziz Miled Sports Hall	2,000
JS Menazah	El Menzah	El Menzah Sports Palace	5,500
Stade Nabeulien	Nabeul	Salle Bir Challouf	5,000
US Ansar	Dar Chaabane	Dar Chaâbane Indoor Hall	1,000
US Monastir	Monastir	Mohamed-Mzali Sports Hall	4,075

== Champions ==
=== By season ===
- 1955–56: L'Orientale (1)
- 1956–57: Stade Gaulois (1)
- 1957–58: AS Française (1)
- 1958–59: Avant-Garde de Tunis (1)
- 1959–60: Avant-Garde de Tunis (2)
- 1960–61: AS Française (2)
- 1961–62: Avant-Garde de Tunis (3)
- 1962–63: Stade Nabeulien (1)
- 1963–64: ES Radès (1)
- 1964–65: ES Radès (2)
- 1965–66: ES Radès (3)
- 1966–67: ES Radès (4)
- 1967–68: ES Radès (5)
- 1968–69: ES Radès (6)
- 1969–70: ES Radès (7)
- 1970–71: ES Radès (8)
- 1971–72: ES Radès (9)
- 1972–73: Zitouna Sports (1)
- 1973–74: CS Cheminots (1)
- 1974–75: Stade Nabeulien (2)
- 1975–76: ES Radès (10)
- 1976–77: ES Tunis (1)
- 1977–78: CS Cheminots (2)
- 1978–79: ES Tunis (2)
- 1979–80: ES Tunis (3)
- 1980–81: ES Sahel (1)
- 1981–82: Ezzahra Sports (1)
- 1982–83: Ezzahra Sports (2)
- 1983–84: ES Radès (11)
- 1984–85: ES Goulettoise (1)
- 1985–86: ES Goulettoise (2)
- 1986–87: ES Goulettoise (3)
- 1987–88: ES Goulettoise (4)
- 1988–89: Stade Nabeulien (3)
- 1989–90: ES Goulettoise (5)
- 1990–91: ES Goulettoise (6)
- 1991–92: Stade Nabeulien (4)
- 1992–93: Ezzahra Sports (3)
- 1993–94: Ezzahra Sports (4)
- 1994–95: ES Goulettoise (7)
- 1995–96: Stade Nabeulien (5)
- 1996–97: Ezzahra Sports (5)
- 1997–98: US Monastir (1)
- 1998–99: Ezzahra Sports (6)
- 1999–00: US Monastir (2)
- 2000–01: JS Kairouan (1)
- 2001–02: JS Kairouan (2)
- 2002–03: JS Kairouan (3)
- 2003–04: Club Africain (1)
- 2004–05: US Monastir (3)
- 2005–06: Stade Nabeulien (6)
- 2006–07: ES Sahel (2)
- 2007–08: Stade Nabeulien (7)
- 2008–09: ES Sahel (3)
- 2009–10: Stade Nabeulien (8)
- 2010–11: ES Sahel (4)
- 2011–12: ES Sahel (5)
- 2012–13: ES Sahel (6)
- 2013–14: Club Africain (2)
- 2014–15: Club Africain (3)
- 2015–16: Club Africain (4)
- 2016–17: ES Radès (12)
- 2017–18: ES Radès (13)
- 2018–19: US Monastir (4)
- 2019–20: US Monastir (5)
- 2020–21: US Monastir (6)
- 2021–22: US Monastir (7)
- 2022–23: US Monastir (8)
- 2023–24: US Monastir (9)
- 2024–25: Club Africain (5)
- 2025–26: US Monastir (10)

=== By Team ===
Team	City	Titles	Winning seasons
ES Radès	Radès	13	1963–64, 1964–65, 1965–66, 1966–67, 1967–68, 1968–69, 1969–70, 1970–71, 1971–72, 1975–76, 1983–84, 2016–17, 2017–18
US Monastir	Monastir	10	1997–98, 1999–00, 2004–05, 2018–19, 2019–20, 2020–21, 2021–22, 2022–23, 2023–24, 2025–26
Stade Nabeulien	Nabeul	8	1962–63, 1974–75, 1988–89, 1991–92, 1995–96, 2005–06, 2007–08, 2009–10
ES Goulettoise	La Goulette	7	1984–85, 1985–86, 1986–87, 1987–88, 1989–90, 1990–91, 1994–95
Ezzahra Sports	Ezzahra	6	1981–82, 1982–83, 1992–93, 1993–94, 1996–97, 1998–99
ES Sahel	Sousse	6	1980–81, 2006–07, 2008–09, 2010–11, 2011–12, 2012–13
Club Africain	Tunis	5	2003–04, 2013–14, 2014–15, 2015–16, 2024–25
JS Kairouan	Kairouan	3	2000–01, 2001–02, 2002–03
ES Tunis	Tunis	3	1976–77, 1978–79, 1979–80
Avant-Garde de Tunis	Tunis	3	1958–59, 1959–60, 1961–62
AS Française	Tunis	2	1957–58, 1960–61
CS Cheminots	Tunis	2	1973–74, 1977–78
Zitouna Sports	Tunis	1	1972–73
Stade Gaulois	Tunis	1	1956–57
L'Orientale	Tunis	1	1955–56

== Finals ==
Only including finals from the 2009–10 season until now.

Season	Champions	Runners-up	Final score
2009–10	Stade Nabeulien (8)	ES Sahel	2–0
2010–11	ES Sahel (3)	Stade Nabeulien	2–0
2011–12	ES Sahel (4)	Stade Nabeulien	2–0
2012–13	ES Sahel (5)	ES Radès	2–0
2013–14	Club Africain (2)	ES Sahel	2–1
2014–15	Club Africain (3)	ES Radès	2–0
2015–16	Club Africain (4)	ES Sahel	2–1
2016–17	ES Radès (12)	ES Sahel	2–0
2017–18	ES Radès (13)	US Monastir	2–1
2018–19	US Monastir (4)	ES Radès	3–1
2019–20	US Monastir (5)	ES Radès	2–0
2020–21	US Monastir (6)	Ezzahra Sports	2–0
2021–22	US Monastir (7)	Ezzahra Sports	3–1
2022–23	US Monastir (8)	Club Africain	3–1
2023–24	US Monastir (9)	Club Africain	3–2
2024–25	Club Africain (5)	US Monastir	3–1
2025–26	US Monastir (10)	JS Kairouan	3–0
