= JS Menazah =

- Nickname: JSM
- Leagues: Championnat Pro A
- Founded: 1997; 29 years ago
- Arena: Palais des sports d'El Menzah
- Capacity: 5,500
- Location: El Menzah, Tunis, Tunisia
- President: (Tunisia) Kais Bleh
- Championships: 1× Women's Tunisian Cups
Home	Away

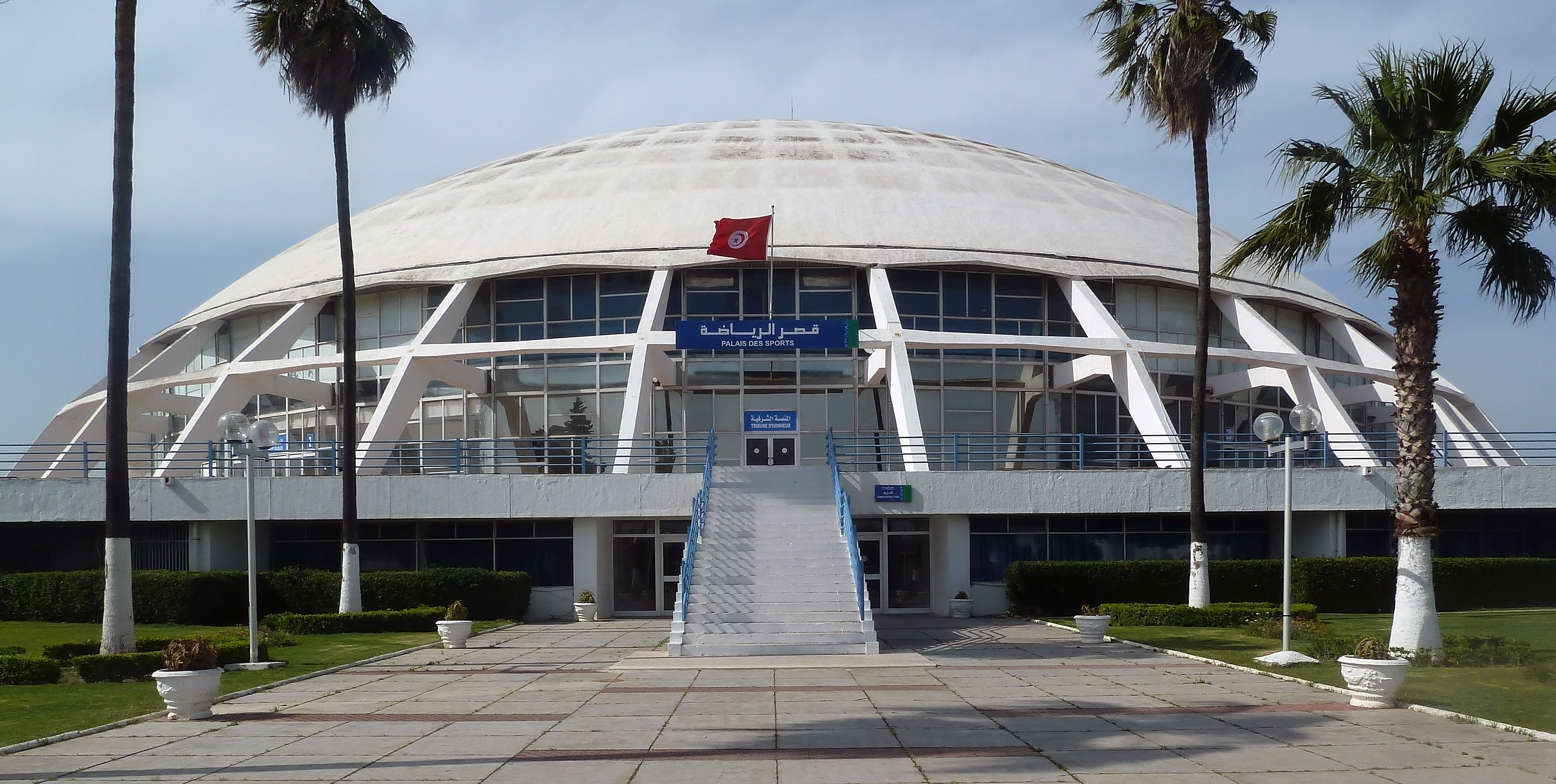
The Palais des Sports d'El Menzah, where JS Menazah plays its home games

Jeunesse Sportive Menazah (Arabic: الشبيبة الرياضية بالمنازه), commonly known as JS Menazah or JSM, is a Tunisian basketball club based in the El Menzah suburbs in Tunis. Established in 1997, the team plays in the Championnat National A.

The team plays in the Palais des sports d'El Menzah, which has a capacity for 5,500 people. In 2017, JSM participated in the Arab Nations Basketball Championship.

== Honours ==
Women's Tunisian Cups

- Champions (1): 2023
