= Dalia Sportive de Grombalia =

- Leagues: Championnat Pro A
- Founded: 1993; 33 years ago
- Arena: Salle Couverte de Grombalia
- Capacity: 1,200
- Location: Grombalia, Tunisia
- President: Mohamed Zied Abid
- Head coach: Safouane Ferjani
Home

Dalia Sportive de Grombalia (Arabic: الدالية الرياضية بڤرمبالية), also known as DSG, is a Tunisian basketball club from Grombalia. Founded in 1993, the team plays in the Championnat National A. The club won its first trophy in 2006, when it won the Tunisian Cup.

== Honours ==
Tunisian Basketball Cup

- Winners (1): 2005–06

Championnat Nationale 1 (Second Division)

- Champions (1): 2014–15

== Players ==
=== Notable players ===
Note: Flags indicate national team eligibility at FIBA-sanctioned events. Players may hold other non-FIBA nationalities not displayed.

Criteria

To appear in this section a player must have either:

- Set a club record or won an individual award while at the club
- Played at least one official international match for their national team at any time
- Played at least one official NBA match at any time.

- (Democratic Republic of the Congo) Rolly Fula
- (North Macedonia) Nenad Zivčević
- (Ivory Coast) Willy Kouassi
