= Étoile Sportive du Sahel (basketball) =

- Nickname: ESS
- Leagues: Championnat Pro A
- Founded: 1957; 69 years ago
- Arena: Olympic Sports Hall
- Capacity: 5,000
- Location: Sousse, Tunisia
- President: Maher Karoui
- Head coach: Amine Rzig
- Website: www.etoile-du-sahel.com
Home	Away

Étoile Sportive du Sahel (Arabic: النجم الرياضي الساحلي) is a Tunisian professional basketball club from Sousse. The club competes in the Championnat Pro A, the first division and has won six league championships in its history.

Notable former players of the team include senior men's Tunisian national basketball team members Makrem Ben Romdhane, Amine Rzig, Salah Mejri. Sahel has won one FIBA Africa Champions Cup, in 2011.

== Honors ==
=== Domestic leagues ===
- Championnat Pro A
  - Champions (6): 1980–81, 2006–07, 2008–09, 2010–11, 2011–12, 2012–13
  - Runners-up (3): 2013–14, 2015–16, 2016–17
- Tunisian Basketball Cup
  - Champions (5): 1980–81, 2010–11, 2011–12, 2012–13, 2015–16
  - Runners-up (3): 1979–80, 1981–82, 2009–10
- Championnat Nationale 1
  - Champions (1): 2021–22
- Tunisian Basketball Super Cup
  - Runners-up (1): 2014
- Tunisian Basketball Federation Cup
  - Champions (1): 2023
  - Runners-up (1): 2017

=== Continental leagues ===
- FIBA Africa Clubs Champions Cup
  - Champions (1): 2011
  - Runners-up (2): 2008, 2013
- Arab Club Championship
  - Champions (2): 2015, 2016
- Houssem Eddine Hariri Tournament
  - Runners-up (3): 2012, 2015, 2016

== Presidents ==
N°	Country	Name	Years				
1	(Tunisia)	Ali Driss	1957–1959				
2	(Tunisia)	Mohamed Atoui	1959–1960				
3	(Tunisia)	Ali Driss	1960–1961				
4	(Tunisia)	Hamed Karoui	1961–1981				
5	(Tunisia)	Abdeljelil Bouraoui	1981–1984				
6	(Tunisia)	Hamadi Mestiri	1984–1988				
7	(Tunisia)	Abdeljelil Bouraoui	1988–1990				
8	(Tunisia)	Hamadi Mestiri	1990–1993				
9	(Tunisia)	Othman Jenayah	1993–2006				
10	(Tunisia)	Moez Driss	2006–2009				
11	(Tunisia)	Hamed Kammoun	2009–2011				
12	(Tunisia)	Hafedh Hmaied	2011–2012				
13	(Tunisia)	Ridha Charfeddine	2012–2021				
14	(Tunisia)	Maher Karoui	2021–2022	15	(Tunisia)	Othmen Jnayeh	2022–present
