= Stade Nabeulien =

- Leagues: Championnat Pro A
- Founded: 1936; 90 years ago
- Arena: Salle Bir Challouf
- Capacity: 5,000
- Location: Nabeul, Tunisia
Home	Away

Stade Nabeulien is a Tunisian professional basketball club from Nabeul. The club competes in the Championnat National A. Notable players of the team include senior men's Tunisian national basketball team members Mohamed Hdidane, Nizar Knioua, and Anis Hedidane.

== Honours ==
=== Domestic competitions ===
Tunisian League

- Champions (8): 1962–63, 1974–75, 1988–89, 1991–92, 1995–96, 2005–06, 2007–08, 2009–10

Tunisian Cup

- Champions (12): 1965–66, 1972–73, 1979–80, 1989–90, 1992–93, 1995–96, 1996–97, 2003–04, 2006–07, 2007–08, 2008–09, 2009–10

=== International competitions ===
Arab Championship

- Champions (1): 1997

== Notable coaches ==
- (Serbia) Vojkan Benčić

== In African competitions ==
FIBA Africa Clubs Champions Cup (1 appearance)

- 2008 – Fourth Place
