= Club Africain (basketball) =

- Nickname: فرع الشيخة
- Leagues: Championnat Pro A
- Founded: 1956; 70 years ago
- History: Club Africain; 1956–present
- Arena: Salle Chérif-Bellamine
- Capacity: 2500
- Location: Tunis, Tunisia
- Team colors: Red and White
- President: Sami El Cadhi
- Head coach: Antonio Luis Pérez Cainzos
- Championships: 5 Tunisian Leagues; 8 Tunisian Cups; 4 Tunisian Supercups
Home	Away

Club Africain (Arabic: النادي الإفريقي) is a Tunisian professional basketball club from Tunis. The club competes in the Championnat Pro A, the top tier of professional basketball in Tunisia. The team has won the national championship five times, the last time being in 2025. Notable players of the team include senior men's Tunisian national basketball team members Mourad El Mabrouk, Marouan Kechrid, Marouen Lahmar, and Naim Dhifallah.

== History ==
The basketball section of Club Africain was established in 1956. The team entered the first-level Championnat National A in the 1979–80 season. Three years later, in 1982, the club won its first trophy when it captured the Tunisian Cup. Rival ES Radès was defeated in the final with a score of 86–71.

In 1999, a second Tunisian Cup was won after US Monastir was narrowly edged in the final, 72–69. Two years later, the third Cup was captured after beating Monastir again.

In 2004, Club Africain won its first Championnat National A championship, after defeating JS Kairouan in the final, 88–87. Naim Dhifallah scored a buzzer-beater with 0.9 seconds on the clock to bring the team its first national title.

Four years later, in 2008, Club Africain made its debut at the international stage when it played in the Zone 4 qualifiers for the 2008 FIBA Africa Clubs Champions Cup. In 2014, the team hosted the FIBA Africa Champions Cup and eventually captured the third place in the tournament.

On March 10, 2024, the Club Africain won the Super Cup of Tunisia 2023 final for the fourth time against the Union Sportive Monastirienne (68-48) at the Radès Sports Hall.

On July 6, 2024, Club Africain won the Tunisian Cup final for the seventh time, defeating Union Sportive Monastirienne 87–55 at the Radès Sports Hall

On May 24, 2025, Club Africain won their fifth championship, ending a 9-year drought, after defeating Monastir 3–1 in the finals over four games.

On February 1, 2026, Club Africain won the Dubai International Tournament for the first time after defeating Beirut Sports Club (71–62) in the semifinals and the United Arab Emirates men's national basketball team (93–77) in the final. Omar Abada was named Most Valuable Player, Oussama Marnaoui won the Top Scorer award, Jamelle Hagins was named Best Center, and Antonio Pérez Caínzos received the Best Coach award of the tournament.

On May 9, 2026, Club Africain won its eighth Tunisian Cup after defeating Union Sportive Monastirienne 67–50 at the Salle Omnisports de Radès.

== Honours ==
- Championnat Pro A (5 titles): 2003–04, 2013–14, 2014–15, 2015–16, 2024–25
- Tunisian Basketball Cup (8 titles): 1981–82, 1998–99, 2000–01, 2002–03, 2013–14, 2014–15, 2023–24, 2025–26
- Tunisian Basketball Super Cup (4 titles): 2003, 2004, 2014, 2023
- Tunisian Basketball Federation Cup (4 titles): 1995, 1998, 2017, 2018

== Players ==
=== Current roster ===
Note: Flags indicate national team eligibility at FIBA-sanctioned events. Players may hold other non-FIBA nationalities not displayed.

Club Africain roster
Players
Coaches

Pos.	No.	Nat.	Name	Ht.	Age
SG	3	(Tunisia)	Romdhane, Youssef	1.91 m (6 ft 3 in)	29 – 27 March 1997
SG	4	(Tunisia)	Bhouri, Eskander	1.90 m (6 ft 3 in)	29 – 12 July 1997
SF	6	(Tunisia)	Ben Maati, Seif	1.95 m (6 ft 5 in)	32 – 17 March 1994
SG	7	(Tunisia)	El Mabrouk, Mourad	1.94 m (6 ft 4 in)	39 – 19 October 1986
PF	8	(Tunisia)	Zahi, Hichem (C)	2.00 m (6 ft 7 in)	44 – 5 October 1981
SF	9	(Tunisia)	Mili, Aziz	2.01 m (6 ft 7 in)	26 – 15 August 2000
PG	11	(Tunisia)	Trabelsi, Aymen	1.87 m (6 ft 2 in)	39 – 6 January 1987
PG	12	(Tunisia)	Oueslati, Mahid	1.80 m (5 ft 11 in)	34 – 12 February 1992
C	21	(Tunisia)	Selmi, Mohamed	2.13 m (7 ft 0 in)	28 – 31 March 1998
PG	24	(Tunisia)	Abada, Omar	1.90 m (6 ft 3 in)	37 – 22 August 1989
PG	25	(Tunisia)	Guizani, Amenallah	1.92 m (6 ft 4 in)	26 – 14 July 2000
F/C	31	(Tunisia)	Saada, Haithem	2.05 m (6 ft 9 in)	31 – 3 February 1995
C	99	(Tunisia)	Ochi, Fares	2.10 m (6 ft 11 in)	27 – 8 February 1999

Head coach

- (Tunisia) Safouane Ferjani

Assistant coach(es)

- (Tunisia) Mohamed Ismail Basbas

Legend

- (C) Team captain
- Injured

- Roster
Updated: November 1, 2023

== Coaches ==
Nat.	Name	Years
(Tunisia)	Monoom Aoun	2003–2006
(Tunisia)	Sami Hussaini	2006–2007
(Tunisia)	Monoom Aoun	2007–2008, 2011–2012
(Serbia)	Branislav Jenc	2012
(Bosnia and Herzegovina)	Dragan Petričević	2012–2013
(Tunisia)	Monoom Aoun	2013–2015
(Serbia)	Predrag Badnjarević	2015–2016
(Portugal)	Mário Palma	2015–2016
(Portugal)	Vasco Curado	2016–2017
(Tunisia)	Zouhaier Ayachi	2017–2018
(Tunisia)	Racem Marzouki	2018–2018
(Tunisia)	Nidhal Ben Abdelkrim	2018–2019
(Portugal)	Mário Palma	2019–

== See also ==
- Club Africain (football)
- Club Africain (handball)
