= Basketball at the 2013 Mediterranean Games =

Tournament details
- Host country: Turkey
- Dates: June 18 – June 25
- Teams: 7 (from 2 federations)
- Venue: 1 (in 1 host city)

The basketball tournament at the 2013 Mediterranean Games in Mersin took place between 18 June and 25 June. The men's tournament was held at the Servet Tazegül Arena. A women's tournament was also planned, but was cancelled because too few teams applied.

== Participating nations ==
The following nations applied to compete in the men's tournament. Albania and Greece declared the withdrawal of their teams from the Games on May 10, 2013. Algeria will be participating in place of Albania. At least six nations competing is the requirement for the tournament to be held. None of the Asian nations have applied to compete.

Men

Federation	Nation
FIBA Africa	Algeria; Egypt; Tunisia
FIBA Europe	Italy; Macedonia; Serbia; Turkey

== Preliminary round ==
All times are Eastern European Summer Time (UTC+3).

=== Group A ===
Qualified for the semifinals

Team	Pld	W	L	PF	PA	PD	Pts
Turkey	3	3	0	260	191	+69	6
Macedonia	3	2	1	220	225	-5	5
Egypt	3	1	2	218	239	-21	4
Algeria	3	0	3	228	271	-43	3

June 18
17:15

Report

North Macedonia	74–67 (OT)	Egypt
Scoring by quarter: 13–20, 12–8, 11–14, 20–14, Overtime: 18–11
Pts: Trajkovski 20; Rebs: Trajkovski 12; Asts: Karadžovski 5		Pts: El-Gammal 16; Rebs: Marei, Abdellah 11; Asts: Abdellah 4

Servet Tazegül Arena, Mersin
Referees: Ciulin (ROU), Tsekov (BUL), Martolini (ITA)

June 18
19:30

Report

Turkey	97–68	Algeria
Scoring by quarter: 20–16, 24–16, 30–16, 23–20
Pts: Mahmutoğlu 17; Rebs: Savaş 6 Asts: Ermiş 5		Pts: Harat 25; Rebs: Harat 7 Asts: Kaouane 3

Servet Tazegül Arena, Mersin
Referees: Licina (SRB), Langar (TUN), Mikhaylov (RUS)

June 19
17:15

Report

Algeria	81–89	North Macedonia
Scoring by quarter: 26–25, 14–17, 13–22, 28–25
Pts: Harat 27; Rebs: Harat 14; Asts: Kaouane 7		Pts: Kostoski 21; Rebs: Karadžovski 6 Asts: Kostoski 6

Servet Tazegül Arena, Mersin
Referees: Mikhaylov (RUS), Cortes (ESP), Langar (TUN)

June 19
19:30

Report

Egypt	66–86	Turkey
Scoring by quarter: 15–23, 10–16, 20–20, 21–27
Pts: El-Gammal 19; Rebs: Marei 5 Asts: El-Gammal 4		Pts: Savaş 19; Rebs: Türkyılmaz 8 Asts: Ermiş 9

Servet Tazegül Arena, Mersin
Referees: Tsekov (BUL), Martolini (ITA), Licina (SRB)

June 21
17:45

Report

Egypt	85–79	Algeria
Scoring by quarter: 15–15, 22–12, 19–17, 14–26
Pts: Abdallah 14; Rebs: Marei 12; Asts: Khedr 7		Pts: Cheriet, Gaham 14; Rebs: Cheriet 9 Asts: Kaouane 11

Servet Tazegül Arena, Mersin
Referees: Licina (SRB), Ciulin (ROU), Cortes (ESP)

June 21
20:00

Report

Turkey	77–57	North Macedonia
Scoring by quarter: 29–18, 15–13, 22–13, 11–13
Pts: Çetin, Savaş 15; Rebs: Kılıçlı 11; Asts: Ermiş 7		Pts: Sokolov 13; Rebs: Šterjov 5 Asts: Avramovski, Kostoski 3

Servet Tazegül Arena, Mersin
Referees: Martolini (ITA), Mikhaylov (RUS), Tsekov (BUL)

=== Group B ===
Qualified for the semifinals

Team	Pld	W	L	PF	PA	PD	Pts
Serbia	2	2	0	157	137	+20	4
Tunisia	2	1	1	141	123	+18	2
Italy	2	0	2	107	145	-38	2

June 18
15:00

Report

Serbia	77–64	Italy
Scoring by quarter: 20–10, 18–17, 19–16, 20–21
Pts: Kalinić 15; Rebs: Dimić, Jović 7 Asts: Jović 5		Pts: Moraschini 20; Rebs: Vitali, Mazzola 4 Asts: De Nicolao, Cournooh 2

Servet Tazegül Arena, Mersin
Referees: Cortes (ESP), Abd El-Moneim (EGY), Denkovski (MKD)

June 19
15:00

Report

Italy	43–68	Tunisia
Scoring by quarter: 5–12, 13–14, 11–24, 14–18
Pts: Vitali 10; Rebs: Cervi 9 Asts: Moraschini 2		Pts: El Mabrouk, Ghayaza 10; Rebs: Ben Romdhane 11; Asts: Ben Romdhane 3

Servet Tazegül Arena, Mersin
Referees: Yilmaz (TUR), Kaddour (ALG), Ciulin (ROU)

June 21
15:30

Report

Tunisia	73– 80	Serbia
Scoring by quarter: 16–18, 20–23, 21–12, 16–27
Pts: Ben Romdhane 24; Rebs: Ben Romdhane 12; Asts: Ben Romdhane, Kechrid 2		Pts: Dimić 14; Rebs: Dimić 7 Asts: Jović, Živanović 2

Servet Tazegül Arena, Mersin
Referees: Denkovski (MKD), Yilmaz (TUR), El-Moneim (EGY)

== Elimination stage ==
=== Championship bracket ===
Semi-finals
June 22
Serbia	94
North Macedonia	49
June 22
Turkey	77
Tunisia	69

Final
June 25
Serbia	62
Turkey	79
Third place
June 25
North Macedonia	58
Tunisia	63

=== Fifth place match ===
June 22
15:00

Egypt	40–83	Italy
Scoring by quarter: 15–21, 3–21, 9–23, 13–18

Servet Tazegül Arena, Mersin

=== Semifinals ===
June 22
17:15

Serbia	94–49	North Macedonia
Scoring by quarter: 27–11, 22–8, 23–15, 22–15

Servet Tazegül Arena, Mersin

June 22
19:30

Turkey	77–69	Tunisia
Scoring by quarter: 20–13, 23–20, 13–20, 21–16

Servet Tazegül Arena, Mersin

=== Bronze medal match ===
June 25
17:15

North Macedonia	58–63	Tunisia
Scoring by quarter: 15–15, 16–14, 11–19, 16–15

Servet Tazegül Arena, Mersin

=== Gold medal match ===
June 25
19:30

Serbia	62–79	Turkey
Scoring by quarter: 18–21, 10–24, 19–17, 15–17

Servet Tazegül Arena, Mersin

== Final standings ==
Rank	Team	Record
Gold medal	Turkey	5–0
Silver medal	Serbia	3–1
Bronze medal	Tunisia	2–2
4	North Macedonia	2–3
5	Italy	1–2
6	Egypt	1–3
7	Algeria	0–3

== Medal summary ==
=== Events ===
Event	Gold	Silver	Bronze
Men	Turkey (TUR); Barış Ermiş; Barış Hersek; Birkan Batuk; Can Mutaf; Cemal Nalga; Deniz Kılıçlı; Doğuş Balbay; Emre Bayav; İzzet Türkyılmaz; Melih Mahmutoğlu; Oğuz Savaş; Serhat Çetin	Serbia (SRB); Miloš Dimić; Stefan Jović; Nikola Marković; Stefan Živanović; Nikola Kalinić; Filip Čović; Nemanja Arnautović; Đorđe Drenovac; Đorđe Majstorović; Nikola Malešević; Darko Balaban; Stefan Nastić	Tunisia (TUN); Omar Mouhli; Mokhtar Mohamed Ghayaza; Makrem Ben Romdhane; Amine Rzig; Youssef Gaddour; Salah Mejri; Radhouane Slimane; Omar Abada; Nizar Knioua; Mourad El Mabrouk; Marouan Kechrid; Zied Chennoufi
