= Tunisia A' national basketball team =

Tunisia
- Joined FIBA: 1956
- FIBA zone: FIBA Africa
- National federation: FTBB
- Coach: Amine Rzig
- Nickname(s): نسور قرطاج (Eagles of Carthage)

AfroCan
- Appearances: 2
- Medals: None
Home	Away

First international
- Tunisia 77–58 Guinea; Bamako, Mali – July 20, 2019

Biggest win
- Tunisia 77–58 Guinea; Bamako, Mali – July 20, 2019

Biggest defeat
- Tunisia 76–82 Kenya (OT); Bamako, Mali – July 24, 2019

The Tunisian A' national basketball team (Arabic: منتخب تونس لكرة السلة للمحليين), nicknamed Les Aigles de Carthage (The Eagles of Carthage or The Carthage Eagles), is the national basketball team of Tunisia.

The team is governed by the Tunisia Basketball Federation (FTBB). (Arabic: الجامعة التونسية لكرة السلة)

== Competitive record ==
=== AfroCan ===
AfroCan
Year	Round	Position	GP	W	L	PF	PA	PD
(Mali) 2019	Quarterfinals	7th	5	3	2	356	339	+17
(Angola) 2023	Quarterfinals	5th	5	4	1	335	306	+29
Total	Quarterfinals	2/2	10	7	3	691	645	+46

== Team ==
=== Current roster ===
This is the 2018-2019 roster.

Tunisia A' national basketball team roster
Players
Coaches

Pos.	No.	Name	Age – Date of birth	Height	Club	Ctr.
C	5	Mohamed Abbassi	29 – 22 April 1986	2.02 m (6 ft 8 in)	Étoile Sportive de Radès	(Tunisia)
G	6	Nizar Knioua	32 – 8 June 1983	1.89 m (6 ft 2 in)	Stade Nabeulien	(Tunisia)
G	7	Mourad El Mabrouk	28 – 19 October 1986	1.85 m (6 ft 1 in)	Club Africain	(Tunisia)
F	9	Mohamed Hdidane	29 – 27 April 1986	2.06 m (6 ft 9 in)	Stade Nabeulien	(Tunisia)
C	11	Mokhtar Ghyaza	28 – 15 November 1986	2.04 m (6 ft 8 in)	Étoile Sportive de Radès	(Tunisia)

Head coach

- (Tunisia) Amine Rzig

Assistant coaches

- (Tunisia) Khelil Ben Ameur
- (Tunisia) Kacem Louerchefani

Legend

- Club – describes last
  club before the tournament
- Age – describes age
  on 20 August 2015

== See also ==
- Tunisia national basketball team
- Tunisia women's national basketball team
- Tunisia men's national under-20 basketball team
- Tunisia national under-19 basketball team
- Tunisia national under-17 basketball team
- Tunisia women's national under-20 basketball team
- Tunisia women's national under-19 basketball team
- Tunisia women's national under-17 basketball team
- Tunisia national 3x3 team
- Tunisia women's national 3x3 team
- Tunisia Basketball Federation
