= 2010 FIBA World Championship Group B =

Group B of the 2010 FIBA World Championship commenced on August 28 and ended on September 2. The group played all of its games at Abdi İpekçi Arena in Istanbul, Turkey.

The group was composed of Brazil, Croatia, Iran, Slovenia, Tunisia and the United States. Their average FIBA World Ranking at the start of the tournament was 19; excluding Tunisia, the lowest in the rankings, it was 14.4. Tunisia, which finished third at the FIBA Africa Championship 2009, and the Asian champion Iran, both made their tournament debuts, while Croatia returned for the first time since 1994. The four teams with the best records in group play – USA, Slovenia, Brazil, and Croatia – advanced to the knockout stage.

== Standings ==
| Pos | Team | Pld | W | L | PF | PA | PD | Pts | Qualification |
|---|---|---|---|---|---|---|---|---|---|
| 1 | United States | 5 | 5 | 0 | 455 | 331 | +124 | 10 | Eighth–finals |
| 2 | Slovenia | 5 | 4 | 1 | 393 | 376 | +17 | 9 | Eighth–finals |
| 3 | Brazil | 5 | 3 | 2 | 398 | 354 | +44 | 8 | Eighth–finals |
| 4 | Croatia | 5 | 2 | 3 | 395 | 407 | −12 | 7 | Eighth–finals |
| 5 | Iran | 5 | 1 | 4 | 301 | 367 | −66 | 6 | |
| 6 | Tunisia | 5 | 0 | 5 | 300 | 407 | −107 | 5 | |

Source: FIBA archive
Rules for classification: 1) points; 2) head-to-head points; 3) head-to-head goal average; 4) head-to-head number of points scored.

All times local (UTC+3)

== August 28 ==
Group B began play on August 28 with three consecutive blowouts. Slovenia scored the first seven points of the game and never trailed in an 80–56 victory over Tunisia. Goran Dragić scored 16 points and dished out eight assists for Slovenia in the victory.

In the second game of the day, the United States handled Croatia in a 28-point victory. The Croatians hung with the United States for the first quarter before the Americans outscored them 26–6 in the second quarter. Eric Gordon scored 16 points to lead the Americans; all twelve players scored, including five in double figures for the United States.

Asian champions Iran made their World Championship debut in the final game of the day against Brazil. The Iranians never seriously mounted a challenge in a 16-point loss. Four players scored in double digits for the Brazilians, led by Leandro Barbosa's 21.

=== Tunisia vs. Slovenia ===
August 28
16:30

Report

| Tunisia | 56–80 | Slovenia |
Scoring by quarter: 14–22, 14–17, 12–24, 16–17
| Pts: Slimane 11; Rebs: Mejri 6 Asts: Slimane, Kechrid 2 | | Pts: Dragić 16; Rebs: Vidmar 7 Asts: Dragić 8 |

Abdi İpekçi Arena, Istanbul
Attendance: 12,500
Referees: Romualdas Brazauskas (LTU), Jose Hernan Melgarejo Pinto (COL), Stephen Seibel (CAN)

=== USA vs. Croatia ===
August 28
19:00

Report

| United States | 106–78 | Croatia |
Scoring by quarter: 22–20, 26–6, 30–22, 28–30
| Pts: Gordon 16; Rebs: Love 10; Asts: Billups, Curry, Westbrook 4 | | Pts: Bogdanović 17; Rebs: Tomić 8 Asts: Ukić 4 |

Abdi İpekçi Arena, Istanbul
Attendance: 12,500
Referees: Reynaldo Antonio Mercedes Sanchez (DOM), Yuji Hirahara (JPN), Christos Christodoulou (GRE)

=== Iran vs. Brazil ===
August 28
21:30

Report

| Iran | 65–81 | Brazil |
Scoring by quarter: 12–22, 17–17, 17–22, 19–20
| Pts: Haddadi 16; Rebs: Haddadi 9 Asts: Kamrani 4 | | Pts: Giovannoni 17; Rebs: Marquinhos 8 Asts: Huertas 9 |

Abdi İpekçi Arena, Istanbul
Attendance: 12,500
Referees: Recep Ankarali (TUR), José Martín (ESP), David Chambon (FRA)

== August 29 ==
Day 2 in Group B play featured another three straight blowouts. In the first game, the United States jumped out to a 10–2 lead and never looked back in a 22-point victory over Slovenia. After Slovenia had cut the lead to five late in the first half, the Americans went on a 31–9 run stretching into the third quarter to blow the game open. Kevin Durant led the United States with 22 points, while five Americans reached double figures for the second consecutive game.

Croatia rebounded from a Day One loss to the United States by beating winless Iran 75–54. The Croatians opened up a 22-point first half lead and were never seriously challenged, despite Hamed Haddadi's game-high 27 points and 9 rebounds. Roko Ukić and Bojan Bogdanović each had 13 points for Croatia in the victory.

Brazil remained undefeated by beating Tunisia 80–65 in the day's final game. Leandro Barbosa scored 21 points – 16 in the first quarter alone – and grabbed 6 rebounds while Tiago Splitter added 16 points.

=== Slovenia vs. USA ===
August 29
16:30

Report

| Slovenia | 77–99 | United States |
Scoring by quarter: 11–23, 17–19, 18–25, 31–32
| Pts: Nachbar 13; Rebs: Nachbar 4 Asts: Dragić, Bečirović 4 | | Pts: Durant 22; Rebs: Love 11; Asts: Rose, Billups 5 |

Abdi İpekçi Arena, Istanbul
Attendance: 12,500
Referees: José Martín (ESP), Christos Christodoulou (GRE), Stephen Seibel (CAN)

=== Croatia vs. Iran ===
August 29
19:00

Report

| Croatia | 75–54 | Iran |
Scoring by quarter: 22–13, 22–11, 9–16, 22–14
| Pts: Ukić, Bogdanović 13; Rebs: Tomić, Banić 7 Asts: Ukić 4 | | Pts: Haddadi 27; Rebs: Haddadi 9 Asts: Davari 4 |

Abdi İpekçi Arena, Istanbul
Attendance: 12,500
Referees: Romualdas Brazauskas (LTU), Recep Ankarali (TUR), Carlos José Julio (ANG)

=== Brazil vs. Tunisia ===
August 29
21:30

Report

| Brazil | 80–65 | Tunisia |
Scoring by quarter: 26–16, 17–14, 16–18, 21–17
| Pts: Barbosa 21; Rebs: Barbosa 6 Asts: Huertas, Giovannoni 3 | | Pts: Kechrid 15; Rebs: Slimane 8 Asts: Kechrid 3 |

Abdi İpekçi Arena, Istanbul
Attendance: 12,500
Referees: Yuji Hirahara (JPN), David Chambon (FRA), Reynaldo Antonio Mercedes Sanchez (DOM)

== August 30 ==
Day 3 of Group B action finally brought three competitive games. The two former Yugoslav republics faced off in the day's first game in a rematch of the Eurobasket 2009 quarterfinal. Like the Eurobasket quarterfinal, Slovenia again prevailed, this time with a 91–84 victory over the Croatians. Slovenia quickly erased a five-point halftime deficit, taking the lead for good on Miha Zupan's three-pointer with 6:33 remaining in the game. Poor free-throw shooting proved to be Croatia's undoing, as they shot only 15 of 26 from the foul line. Uroš Slokar and Jaka Lakovič each scored 15 points for the Slovenians, while Roko Ukić scored a game-high 20 points for Croatia in the losing effort.

Tournament debutants Iran and Tunisia faced off in the second game of the day, each looking for their first ever World Championship victory. The Iranians came away with the victory after Hamed Haddadi turned in another strong performance (23 points, 13 rebounds). Iran opened up a 24-point second half lead as Tunisia struggled to shoot the ball, scoring only 36 points in the first three quarters. The Tunisians used a furious 21–2 run to pull to within three with five minutes left before Iran pulled away for the victory.

Unbeaten Brazil and United States met in the day's final game in a match that would determine the group winner, in all likelihood. Brazil was again without the services of Anderson Varejão, who rested with a sprained right ankle after expecting to be ready for the game. Brazil led for much of the first three quarters in a tight game before Derrick Rose made a shot that gave the USA a 52–50 lead that they would not relinquish until the fourth quarter. After Brazil tied the game in the fourth, Lamar Odom's dunk with 7:13 left that gave the Americans a 64–62 lead that they would not relinquish. Brazil had two chances to send the game to overtime in the final seconds, but Marcelo Huertas missed two free throws and Leandro Barbosa's shot clanged off the rim as time expired. Kevin Durant led the Americans with 27 points and 10 rebounds as most of the Americans struggled in their first real challenge of the tournament.

=== Slovenia vs. Croatia ===
August 30
16:30

Report

| Slovenia | 91–84 | Croatia |
Scoring by quarter: 16–18, 23–26, 26–15, 26–25
| Pts: Slokar, Lakovič 15; Rebs: Brezec 8 Asts: Dragić, Lakovič 4 | | Pts: Ukić 20; Rebs: Žorić 9 Asts: Ukić 7 |

Abdi İpekçi Arena, Istanbul
Attendance: 12,500
Referees: Reynaldo Antonio Mercedes Sanchez (DOM), Yuji Hirahara (JPN), David Chambon (FRA)

=== Tunisia vs. Iran ===
August 30
19:00

Report

| Tunisia | 58–71 | Iran |
Scoring by quarter: 11–23, 12–10, 13–22, 22–16
| Pts: Romdhane, Mejri 10; Rebs: Mejri 9 Asts: Slimane, Hdidane 3 | | Pts: Haddadi 23; Rebs: Haddadi 13; Asts: Kamrani 3 |

Abdi İpekçi Arena, Istanbul
Attendance: 12,500
Referees: José Martín (ESP), Jose Hernan Melgarejo Pinto (COL), Carlos José Julio (ANG)

=== USA vs. Brazil ===
August 30
21:30

Report

| United States | 70–68 | Brazil |
Scoring by quarter: 22–28, 21–18, 18–13, 9–9
| Pts: Durant 27; Rebs: Durant 10; Asts: Billups 3 | | Pts: Marquinhos 16; Rebs: Splitter 10; Asts: Huertas 5 |

Abdi İpekçi Arena, Istanbul
Attendance: 12,500
Referees: Romualdas Brazauskas (LTU), Christos Christodoulou (GRE), Stephen Seibel (CAN)

== August 31 ==
Rest day.

== September 1 ==
Group B was back in action on September 1 following a rest day. In the first game of the day, Tunisia continued to struggle as Croatia jumped out to a 20-point halftime lead en route to an 84–64 victory. Bojan Bogdanović led the Croatians with 19 points while Makrem Ben Romdhane was the only Tunisian in double figures, with a game-high 23 points. The victory, coupled with Iran's loss, clinched a spot in the knockout round for Croatia. Tunisia, meanwhile, was eliminated with the loss.

The Americans clinched first place in the group with an 88–51 victory over Iran in the day's second game. Iran provided some resistance for the lethargic Americans, trailing by single digits for much of the first half before being outscored by 23 in the second half. Kevin Love led the Americans with 13 points in only 11 minutes of action, while Hamed Haddadi again led the Iranians with 19 points.

In the battle for second place in the group, Slovenia beat Brazil 80–77 despite Anderson Varejão making his tournament debut for the Brazilians. Primož Brezec hit his first seven shots to help Slovenia take a 14-point halftime lead. Brazil cut the lead to two with 4 minutes remaining but could come no closer as Slovenia clinched second place in the group. Slovenia's loss also eliminated Iran from contention, sending Croatia and Brazil to the knockout round.

=== Croatia vs. Tunisia ===
September 1
16:30

Report

| Croatia | 84–64 | Tunisia |
Scoring by quarter: 23–12, 20–11, 22–17, 19–24
| Pts: Bogdanović 19; Rebs: Tomić 9 Asts: Planinić, Popović 5 | | Pts: Romdhane 23; Rebs: Slimane 9 Asts: Knioua 4 |

Abdi İpekçi Arena, Istanbul
Attendance: 12,500
Referees: Romualdas Brazauskas (LTU), Stephen Seibel (CAN), Carlos José Julio (ANG)

=== Iran vs. USA ===
September 1
19:00

Report

| Iran | 51–88 | United States |
Scoring by quarter: 13–19, 15–23, 11–20, 12–26
| Pts: Haddadi 19; Rebs: Kazemi, Haddadi 5 Asts: Davoudi 2 | | Pts: Love 13; Rebs: Love, Chandler 6 Asts: Curry 5 |

Abdi İpekçi Arena, Istanbul
Attendance: 12,500
Referees: David Chambon (FRA), Yuji Hirahara (JPN), Jose Hernan Melgarejo Pinto (COL)

=== Brazil vs. Slovenia ===
September 1
21:30

Report

| Brazil | 77–80 | Slovenia |
Scoring by quarter: 18–20, 12–24, 21–23, 26–13
| Pts: Machado 20; Rebs: Varejão, Splitter 4 Asts: Huertas 10 | | Pts: Lakovič 20; Rebs: Bečirovič 9 Asts: Bečirovič 4 |

Abdi İpekçi Arena, Istanbul
Attendance: 12,500
Referees: José Martín (ESP), Recep Ankarali (TUR), Reynaldo Antonio Mercedes Sanchez (DOM)

== September 2 ==
There was little to play for on Day 5 of Group B play, as only Brazil and Croatia had positions to play for. The United States sleepwalked to a six-point halftime lead before taking over in the second half in a 92–57 victory over Tunisia. Eric Gordon scored 21 points as the United States finished group play undefeated for the second consecutive World Championship. Tunisia ended their first World Championship appearance without a win.

In the day's second game, Slovenia held off a late charge by Iran in a 65–60 victory. Hamed Haddadi scored 15 points to conclude a strong tournament for the Iranian team.

The only game of the day with implication in the standings had little drama as Brazil rebounded from two straight losses dominated Croatia in a 92–74 victory. With the victory, Brazil clinched third place in the group to set up a quarterfinal match with rivals and Group A runner-up Argentina.

=== USA vs. Tunisia ===
September 2
16:30

Report

| United States | 92–57 | Tunisia |
Scoring by quarter: 19–13, 20–20, 24–13, 29–13
| Pts: Gordon 21; Rebs: Iguodala 6 Asts: 6 tied with 2 | | Pts: Kechrid 15; Rebs: Mejri 8 Asts: Dhifallah 2 |

Abdi İpekçi Arena, Istanbul
Attendance: 12,500
Referees: Recep Ankarali (TUR), Carlos José Julio (ANG), Jose Hernan Melgarejo Pinto (COL)

=== Slovenia vs. Iran ===
September 2
19:00

Report

| Slovenia | 65–60 | Iran |
Scoring by quarter: 19–6, 9–17, 24–11, 13–26
| Pts: Dragić 18; Rebs: Dragić 6 Asts: Bečirovič 3 | | Pts: Haddadi 15; Rebs: Kazemi 14; Asts: Davari 4 |

Abdi İpekçi Arena, Istanbul
Attendance: 12,500
Referees: Yuji Hirahara (JPN), Christos Christodoulou (GRE), Reynaldo Antonio Mercedes Sanchez (DOM)

=== Brazil vs. Croatia ===
September 2
21:30

Report

| Brazil | 92–74 | Croatia |
Scoring by quarter: 22–19, 26–16, 24–15, 20–24
| Pts: Machado 18; Rebs: Varejão 12; Asts: Huertas 6 | | Pts: Popović 15; Rebs: Bogdanović, Lončar 6 Asts: Tomas 3 |

Abdi İpekçi Arena, Istanbul
Attendance: 12,500
Referees: Romualdas Brazauskas (LTU), Stephen Seibel (CAN), David Chambon (FRA)
