= FIBA AfroBasket All-Tournament Team =

Two-year award by the International Basketball Federation

The AfroBasket All-Tournament Team is a FIBA award given every two years, awarded to the five strongest competitors throughout the tournament.

== Honourees ==
Year	Player	Position	Team	Ref.
2005	Miguel Lutonda	Guard	Angola	
2005	Abdelhalim Sayah	Guard	Algeria	
2005	Olímpio Cipriano	Forward	Angola	
2005	Ime Udoka	Forward	Nigeria	
2005	Boniface N'Dong	Center	Senegal	
2007	Marques Houtman	Guard	Cape Verde	
2007	Olímpio Cipriano (2)	Forward	Angola	
2007	Rodrigo Mascarenhas	Forward	Cape Verde	
2007	Luc Mbah a Moute	Forward	Cameroon	
2007	Joaquim Gomes	Forward	Angola	
2009	Pape-Philippe Amagou	Guard	Ivory Coast	
2009	Amine Rzig	Guard	Tunisia	
2009	Romain Sato	Forward	Central African Republic	
2009	Joaquim Gomes (2)	Forward	Angola	
2009	DeSagana Diop	Center	Senegal	
2011	Marouan Kechrid	Guard	Tunisia	
2011	Carlos Morais	Guard	Angola	
2011	Ime Udoka (2)	Forward	Nigeria	
2011	Makrem Ben Romdhane	Center	Tunisia	
2011	Salah Mejri	Center	Tunisia	
2013	Mouloukou Diabate	Guard	Ivory Coast	
2013	Carlos Morais (2)	Guard	Angola	
2013	Maleye Ndoye	Forward	Senegal	
2013	Eduardo Mingas	Forward	Angola	
2013	Assem Marei	Forward	Egypt	
2015	Carlos Morais (3)	Guard	Angola	
2015	Chamberlain Oguchi	Guard	Nigeria	
2015	Al-Farouq Aminu	Forward	Nigeria	
2015	Gorgui Dieng	Forward	Senegal	
2015	Makram Ben Romdhane (2)	Center	Tunisia	
2017	Gorgui Dieng (2)	Forward	Senegal	
2017	Ike Diogu	Forward-center	Nigeria	
2017	Mourad El Mabrouk	Guard	Tunisia	
2017	Mohamed Hdidane	Forward	Tunisia	
2017	Ikenna Iroegbu	Guard	Nigeria	
2021	Gorgui Dieng (3)	Forward	Senegal	
2021	Omar Abada	Guard	Tunisia	
2021	Matt Costello	Forward	Ivory Coast	
2021	Edy Tavares	Center	Cape Verde	
2021	Makram Ben Romdhane (3)	Center	Tunisia	
2025	Childe Dundão	Guard	Angola	
2025	Brancou Badio	Guard	Senegal	
2025	Mahamane Coulibaly	Forward	Mali	
2025	Bruno Fernando	Forward	Angola	
2025	Aliou Diarra	Center	Mali	

== See also ==
- FIBA AfroBasket Most Valuable Player
- FIBA Basketball World Cup Most Valuable Player
- FIBA Basketball World Cup All-Tournament Team
- FIBA Awards
