= JS Kairouan (basketball) =

Tunisian professional basketball club

- Nickname: Chabiba, JSK
- Leagues: Championnat Pro A
- Founded: 1942; 84 years ago
- Arena: Salle Azaiez Miled
- Capacity: 3,000
- Location: Kairouan, Tunisia
- Main sponsor: Hummel
- President: Chokri Rahmani
- Team manager: Mohamed Slim Mejbri
- Head coach: Marouan Kechrid
- Assistant: Jad Jaouadi
- Team captain: Ahmed Dhif
- 2025-26 position: 2nd
- Championships: 3
Home	Away

Jeunesse Sportive Kairouan, also known as JS Kairouan or Chabiba , is a Tunisian professional basketball club from Kairouan. The club competes in the Championnat National A, the highest league in Tunisian basketball. Kairouan has won the league three times, with three consecutive titles in 2001, 2002 and 2003.

The team plays its home games at the Salle Azaïez Miled in Kairouan, an indoor arena with a seating capacity of 3,000. Known across the league as one of the most hostile environments for visiting teams, the venue frequently reaches full capacity during high-stakes domestic playoffs and international fixtures. The connection between the club and its fanbase is central to JSK’s identity; during their 2019 continental campaign, club leadership famously insisted on hosting key FIBA AfroLeague matches in Kairouan rather than moving to a larger neutral stadium in Tunis, citing the home crowd at Salle Azaïez Miled as an essential factor for the team's performance. The team colors are green and white.

Known locally as Chabiba (meaning "The Youth"), JS Kairouan holds a distinct reputation in Tunisian sports as an elite talent factory. Unlike many top-tier Tunisian clubs that rely heavily on expensive transfers, JSK's basketball success has historically been built around its local academy and home-grown players. The club is famous for producing high-caliber players who went on to lead the Tunisian national team.

JS Kairouan holds a unique place in Tunisian basketball history as one of the few elite clubs based outside the traditional power bases of Tunis and the coastal Sahel region. Their emergence as a championship force in the late 1990s and early 2000s directly challenged the long-standing dominance of capital giants like Club Africain and coastal clubs. Matches against neighboring rivals US Monastir and Étoile Sportive du Sahel, as well as Tunis-based teams, routinely rank among the most intensely followed fixtures in the Championnat Pro A.

In March 2019, the club qualified for 2018–19 Africa Basketball League Final 4.

== History ==
Although this section has existed since 1962, it only began to make a name for itself starting in 1985. Before that, it was part of the lower divisions and often failed to complete the season. In the 1985–1986 season, the team won the second division championship but failed in the promotion playoffs.

The club’s leadership decided to focus more seriously on the discipline and brought in specialized coaches: Habib Belhassen followed by Abdessattar Elloumi. This allowed the club to reach the top tier for the first time in 1989. The team’s first experience in the first division was difficult, and the squad — which included players such as Ahmed Kéfi, Moncef Aininou, and Ali Zaïri — was relegated to the honor division. A year later, it regained its place, and the section, led by Mohamed Atallah and then by Moncef Chemli, continued to progress, improving its standings year after year as basketball became increasingly established in Kairouan.

In 1995, the cadet team became champions of Tunisia, while the under-13s won the cup in 1999 and 2001. The first major achievement at senior level came with the team’s first national championship win in 2001, thanks to a group of high-level players such as Radhouane Slimane, Atef Maoua, and Walid Dhouibi. That title was followed by others, including a double in 2002 and a Maghreb championship won in 2003. In October 2005, JSK won the Tunisian Super Cup final against Union Sportive Monastirienne at the Sousse sports hall.

On March 26, 2003, Jeunesse Sportive Kairouanaise won the Maghreb Championship held at the Ibn Yassine hall in Rabat, after defeating Widad Adabi Boufarik in the final (67–55).

In 2013, Jeunesse Sportive Kairouanaise lost the Federation Cup final against Club Athlétique Bizertin (77–87). In 2015, JSK won the Federation Cup by defeating Stade Nabeulien in the final.

During the first edition of the AfroLeague in 2019 (the former name of the FIBA Africa Clubs Champions Cup), Jeunesse Sportive Kairouanaise finished third in the qualifying tournament and second in its group during the final phase. In the quarterfinals, they defeated Étoile Sportive de Radès (68–67 in Kairouan and 74–73 in Radès). JSK was eliminated in the semifinals by Association Sportive de Salé (81–73) and lost the third-place match against Smouha SC (58–69).

Ahmed Dhif was the tournament’s best passer with an average of 5.7 assists per game and had the third-best free throw percentage (80%). Lawrence Gilbert Jr., selected for the tournament's second team, was the fourth-best scorer with 17.4 points per game. Maodo Nguirane, also selected for the second team, was the second-best rebounder with 11.1 rebounds per game, the most efficient player, and had the most double-doubles (four in total). Jawhar Jaouadi had the fifth-best free throw percentage (79.2%).

== Honours ==
Tunisian League

- Winners (3): 2000–01, 2001–02, 2002–03

Tunisian Cup

- Winners (2): 2001–02, 2004–05

Tunisian Federation Cup

- Winners (2): 2015, 2025

Tunisian Super Cup

- Winners (1): 2005

Maghrebine Basketball Cup

- Winners (1): 2003

== In African competitions ==
FIBA Africa Basketball League (1 appearances)

2018–19 – Fourth Place

== Players ==
=== Current roster ===
Note: Flags indicate national team eligibility at FIBA-sanctioned events. Players may hold other non-FIBA nationalities not displayed.

JS Kairouan roster
Players
Coaches

Pos.	No.	Nat.	Name	Ht.	Wt.	Age
PG	8	(Tunisia)	Dhif, Youssef	1.82 m (6 ft 0 in)		24 – 15 February 2002
G	2	(Tunisia)	Mnafedh, Mohamed	1.86 m (6 ft 1 in)		25 – 1 June 2001
PF	34	(Tunisia)	Chihi, Belhassen	1.95 m (6 ft 5 in)		28 – 19 August 1998
C	11	(Nigeria)	Azolibe, Francis	2.06 m (6 ft 9 in)		27 – 4 October 1999
C	35	(Tunisia)	Hammi, Amenallah	2.04 m (6 ft 8 in)		20 – 11 August 2006

Head coach

- (Tunisia) Marouan Kechrid

Assistant coach(es)

- (Tunisia) Jad Jaouadi

Legend

- (C) Team captain
- Injured

- Roster
Updated: October 9, 2026

== Former Players ==
- (Tunisia) Mohamed Abbassi
- (Tunisia) Ahmed Addami
- (Tunisia) Ahed Ajmi
- (Tunisia) Islem Ajmi
- (Tunisia) Hamdi Braa
- (United States) Detrek Browning
- (United States) Da'Quan Cook
- (Tunisia) Ahmed Dhif
- (Tunisia) Naim Dhifallah
- (Tunisia) Hamza Foudhaili
- (Tunisia) Youssef Gaddour
- (Tunisia) Omar Abada
- (Tunisia) Jawhar Jaouadi
- (Senegal) Mansour Kasse
- (Tunisia) Marouan Kechrid
- (Tunisia) Souheil Kechrid
- (United States) Lawrence Gilbert Jr
- (Tunisia) Wassef Kechrid
- (Tunisia) Marouan Laghnej
- (Greece) Damien Issa
- (United States) Jordan Eric Jackson Jr.
- (United States) Malcolm Battles
- (Senegal) Maodo Nguirane
- (Tunisia) Atef Maoua
- (Tunisia) Oussama Marnaoui
- (United States) Zeke Marshall
- (Tunisia) Wassef Methnani
- (Serbia) Radoslav Pekovic
- (Tunisia) Hamza Slimane
- (Tunisia) Radhouane Slimane
- (Kenya) Tom Wamukota
- (United States) George Williams
- (Saint Vincent and the Grenadines) Nyika Williams

== See also ==
- JS Kairouan
