= 2012 FIBA Stanković Continental Champions' Cup =

2012 FIBA Stanković Continental Champions Cup
9th FIBA Stanković Continental Champions Cup

Tournament details
- Host country: China
- Dates: July 6 – 10
- Teams: 4
- Venue(s): 1 (in 1 host city)

Final positions
- Champions: China (1st title)

Tournament statistics
- Games played: 8

The 2012 FIBA Stanković Continental Champions' Cup, or 2012 FIBA Mini World Cup, officially called Dongfeng Yueda KIA FIBA Stanković Continental Champions' Cup 2012, was the 9th annual FIBA Stanković Continental Champions' Cup tournament. It was held in Guangzhou, China, from July 6 to 10.

== Participating teams ==
- Australia
- China
- Russia
- Tunisia

== Game results ==
All 4 teams played a round-robin tournament first. The top 2 teams advanced to final while the other 2 teams fought for the 3rd place.

=== Round-robin ===
Team	Pld	W	L	PF	PA	PD	Pts
China	3	3	0	225	165	+60	6
Australia	3	1	2	180	190	-10	4
Russia	3	1	2	191	202	-11	4
Tunisia	3	1	2	169	208	-39	4

- All time UTC+8.

July 06
19:30

China	85–54	Tunisia
Scoring by quarter: 24–21, 21-13, 26-11, 14-9
Pts: Yi Jianlian 22; Rebs: Yi Jianlian 10; Asts: Ding Jinhui, Sun Yue, Zhu Fangyu, Guo Ailun 3		Pts: Marouan Kechrid 12; Rebs: Mehdi Hafsi 6 Asts: Marouan Kechrid 5

Tianhe Sports Center, Guangzhou

July 06
21:30

Russia	61–76	Australia
Scoring by quarter: 10-16, 15-20, 21-16, 15-24
Pts: Nikita Barinov 16; Rebs: Nikita Barinov 16; Asts: Zaytsev Viatcheslav 4		Pts: Jason Cadee 21; Rebs: Cameron Bairstow, Clint Steindl 5 Asts: Mills, Jason Cadee 5

Tianhe Sports Center, Guangzhou

July 07
16:00

Russia	63–53	Tunisia
Scoring by quarter: 8-14, 15-13, 21–13, 19-13
Pts: Nikita Barinov 14; Rebs: Nikita Barinov 5 Asts: Nikita Barinov, Maxim Kolyshkin 3		Pts: Makrem Ben Romdhane 21; Rebs: Amine Rzig 8 Asts: Marouan Kechrid 4

Tianhe Sports Center, Guangzhou

July 07
19:30

China	67–44	Australia
Scoring by quarter: 21-9, 12-10, 15-9, 19-16
Pts: Zhu Fangyu 12; Rebs: Zhang Zhaoxu 10; Asts: Sun Yue, Liu Wei 3

Tianhe Sports Center, Guangzhou

July 08
16:00

Tunisia	62–60	Australia
Scoring by quarter: 12-14, 17-18, 13-16, 20-12
Pts: Makrem Ben Romdhane 24; Rebs: Makrem Ben Romdhane 12; Asts: Marouan Kechrid 6		Pts: Clint Steindl, Hugh Greenwood 11; Rebs: Cody Ellis 7 Asts: Jason Cadee 7

Tianhe Sports Center, Guangzhou

July 08
19:30

China	73–67	Russia
Scoring by quarter: 13–20, 24–12, 16–14, 20-21
Pts: Yi Jianlian 28; Rebs: Yi Jianlian 17; Asts: Guo Ailun 4

Tianhe Sports Center, Guangzhou

=== Third-place Playoff ===
July 10
19:30

Tunisia	80–51	Russia
Scoring by quarter: 19-11, 17-7, 21-12, 23-21
Pts: Makrem Ben Romdhane 17; Rebs: Makrem Ben Romdhane 13; Asts: Makrem Ben Romdhane 4		Pts: Ivan Lazarev 13; Rebs: Nikita Barinov 8 Asts: Ivan Strebkov 5

Tianhe Sports Center, Guangzhou

=== Final ===
July 10
21:30

China	70–51	Australia
Scoring by quarter: 18-10, 16-8, 20-13, 16-20

Tianhe Sports Center, Guangzhou

== Final standings ==
Rank	Team	Record
Gold medal	China	4-0
Silver medal	Australia	1-3
Bronze medal	Tunisia	2-2
4th	Russia	1-3

== Individual awards ==
=== All-Star Five ===
- Jason Cadee ( Australia)
- Sun Yue ( China)
- Zhu Fangyu ( China)
- Yi Jianlian ( China)
- Wang Zhizhi ( China)
