= 2025 Arab Basketball Championship =

Tournament details
- Host country: Bahrain
- City: Isa Town
- Dates: 25 July − 2 August
- Teams: 7 (from 2 confederations)
- Venue: 1 (in 1 host city)

Final positions
- Champions: Algeria (2nd title)
- Runners-up: Tunisia
- Third place: United Arab Emirates
- Fourth place: Bahrain

Tournament statistics
- Games played: 21
- MVP: (Bahrain) JaKarr Sampson
- Top scorer: (United Arab Emirates) DeMarco Dickerson (24.8 ppg)

The 2025 Arab Basketball Championship was the 26th edition of the Arab Basketball Championship for men's national basketball teams of the Arab World, organized by the Arab Basketball Confederation. The championship was hosted by Bahrain for the first time, and it was held from 25 July to 2 August 2025.

Algeria went undefeated at the tournament to win their second title by defeating host Bahrain 70–69 in the 6th matchday.

== Host selection ==
Initially, on 1 February 2025, Tunisia was announced as the host of the upcoming 2025 Arab Championship, with all matches scheduled to take place in Nabeul. However, by mid-July, the Arab Basketball Confederation confirmed that Bahrain would host the 26th edition of the Championship, following Tunisia's withdrawal from organizing the event.

== Participating teams ==
Seven of the 22 teams affiliated with the Arab Confederation participated in this edition. Owing to the scheduling of the 2025 FIBA Asia Cup immediately following the tournament, the Asian member associations that had qualified for the continental event chose not to take part, with the exception of Qatar, which fielded a reserve team.

Team	App	First	Last	Best placement in tournament	WR
Algeria	15th	1974	2023	Champions (2005)	121
Bahrain	4th	1978	2018	Third place (2017)	66
Egypt U23 (Note: Egypt fielded an olympic team, as the first team was preparing for the 2025 AfroBasket tournament scheduled to take place in Angola from August 12 to 24.)	19th	1974	2023	Champions (13 times)	38
Kuwait	7th	1975	2023	Third place (1975, 1978)	112
Qatar B	3rd	1999	2007	Semi-finals (1999)	87
Tunisia	14th	1981	2023	Champions (1981, 1983, 2008, 2009)	36
United Arab Emirates	9th	1987	2023	Third place (1997)	103

== Standings ==
Pos	Team	Pld	W	L	PF	PA	PD	Pts
1st place, gold medalist(s)	Algeria (C)	6	6	0	511	421	+90	12
2nd place, silver medalist(s)	Tunisia	6	5	1	506	448	+58	11
3rd place, bronze medalist(s)	United Arab Emirates	6	3	3	456	495	−39	9 (Note: Head-to-head: United Arab Emirates 81–79 Bahrain)
4	Bahrain (H)	6	3	3	486	468	+18	9
5	Egypt U23	6	2	4	496	474	+22	8 (Note: Head-to-head: Qatar B 69–90 Egypt)
6	Qatar B	6	2	4	418	473	−55	8
7	Kuwait	6	0	6	422	516	−94	6

Source: ABC
Rules for classification: 1) Points; 2) Head-to-head results; 3) Points difference; 4) Points scored.
(C) Champions; (H) Hosts

== Results ==
25 July 2025
16:00

Boxscore

Tunisia	81–86	Algeria
Scoring by quarter: 20–23, 12–13, 16–22, 33–28
Pts: Abada 13; Rebs: Methnani 8 Asts: Abada 8		Pts: Sedoud 21; Rebs: Sedoud 4 Asts: Briki 8

Khalifa Sports City Arena

25 July 2025
18:00

Boxscore

Kuwait	79–87	United Arab Emirates
Scoring by quarter: 21–23, 19–23, 19–22, 20–19
Pts: Adnan Hasan 23; Rebs: Adnan Hasan 11; Asts: Al-Baloushi 8		Pts: Al-Shabibi 26; Rebs: Al-Shabibi 14; Asts: Ahmed 6

Khalifa Sports City Arena

25 July 2025
20:00

Boxscore

Bahrain	72–61	Qatar B
Scoring by quarter: 14–6, 17–18, 19–13, 22–24
Pts: Sampson 26; Rebs: Husain Ali 13; Asts: Salman 6		Pts: Janjić 22; Rebs: Janjić 11; Asts: Janjić 6

Khalifa Sports City Arena

26 July 2025
16:00

Boxscore

Kuwait	61–86	Tunisia
Scoring by quarter: 16–21, 14–21, 10–23, 21–21
Pts: Al-Shammari 17; Rebs: Al-Shammari, Adnan Hasan 6 Asts: Al-Baloushi 9		Pts: Jawadi 21; Rebs: Toumi 11; Asts: Abada 8

Khalifa Sports City Arena

26 July 2025
18:00

Boxscore

Qatar B	69–90	Egypt U23
Scoring by quarter: 18–31, 13–26, 12–12, 26–21
Pts: Moosa 19; Rebs: Hussein, Jama 6 Asts: Moosa 3		Pts: M. Mohamed, Yasser 12; Rebs: Khaled 9 Asts: Amin 8

Khalifa Sports City Arena

26 July 2025
20:00

Boxscore

United Arab Emirates	81–79	Bahrain
Scoring by quarter: 21–23, 25–13, 12–28, 23–15
Pts: Dickerson, Al-Shabibi 18; Rebs: Ndiaye, Dickerson 10; Asts: Dickerson 12		Pts: Sampson 29; Rebs: Sampson 10; Asts: Buallay 5

Khalifa Sports City Arena

27 July 2025
16:00

Boxscore

Egypt U23	96–65	Kuwait
Scoring by quarter: 23–19, 29–18, 23–15, 21–13
Pts: M. Mohamed 15; Rebs: Mostafa, H. Ashraf 7 Asts: Amin 7		Pts: Al-Shammari 17; Rebs: Al-Shammari 5 Asts: Al-Bahar 3

Khalifa Sports City Arena

27 July 2025
18:00

Boxscore

Algeria	99–61	United Arab Emirates
Scoring by quarter: 27–14, 20–13, 28–22, 24–12
Pts: Roubai 14; Rebs: Ben Zaim 7 Asts: Alain 7		Pts: Dickerson 19; Rebs: Ndiaye 4 Asts: Khalil, Hussein 4

Khalifa Sports City Arena

27 July 2025
20:00

Boxscore

Bahrain	86–97	Tunisia
Scoring by quarter: 23–26, 22–22, 24–24, 17–25
Pts: Husain Ali 24; Rebs: Sampson 7 Asts: Husain Ali 6		Pts: Abada 24; Rebs: Toumi 11; Asts: Abada 8

Khalifa Sports City Arena

29 July 2025
16:00

Boxscore

Algeria	92–66	Qatar B
Scoring by quarter: 28–14, 20–20, 20–13, 24–19
Pts: Ben Zaim 21; Rebs: Ben Zaim 11; Asts: Labouize 4		Pts: Janjić 19; Rebs: Janjić 7 Asts: Moosa 4

Khalifa Sports City Arena

29 July 2025
18:00

Boxscore

United Arab Emirates	70–78	Tunisia
Scoring by quarter: 15–24, 22–19, 16–22, 17–13
Pts: Dickerson 27; Rebs: Al-Shabibi 12; Asts: A. Ahmed 6		Pts: Abada 18; Rebs: Ochi 9 Asts: Gannouni 8

Khalifa Sports City Arena

29 July 2025
20:00

Boxscore

Egypt U23	85–91	Bahrain
Scoring by quarter: 25–28, 25–25, 13–11, 22–27
Pts: M. Mohamed 19; Rebs: M. Ashraf 10; Asts: Amin 9		Pts: Sampson 28; Rebs: Chism, Sampson 9 Asts: three player 4

Khalifa Sports City Arena

30 July 2025
16:00

Boxscore

Qatar B	78–71	United Arab Emirates
Scoring by quarter: 15–15, 27–19, 17–21, 19–16
Pts: Janjić 33; Rebs: Avdic 9 Asts: Janjić, Avdic 6		Pts: Dickerson 28; Rebs: three players 8 Asts: Dickerson 9

Khalifa Sports City Arena

30 July 2025
18:00

Boxscore

Kuwait	74–86	Algeria
Scoring by quarter: 16–24, 25–14, 19–26, 14–22
Pts: Al-Hamidi 22; Rebs: Al-Baloushi, Adnan Hasan 9 Asts: Al-Baloushi 10		Pts: Bensalah 15; Rebs: three players 6 Asts: Alain 9

Khalifa Sports City Arena

30 July 2025
20:00

Boxscore

Tunisia	85–73	Egypt U23
Scoring by quarter: 23–17, 22–22, 19–21, 21–13
Pts: Jawadi 21; Rebs: Ochi 9 Asts: Abada 7		Pts: Moheb 20; Rebs: Amin 5 Asts: Four players 3

Khalifa Sports City Arena

1 August 2025
16:00

Boxscore

Egypt U23	82–86	United Arab Emirates
Scoring by quarter: 21–18, 15–17, 24–19, 22–32
Pts: Amin 28; Rebs: Khaled, Moheb 6 Asts: Amin 7		Pts: Dickerson 33; Rebs: Ndiaye, Dickerson 9 Asts: A. Ahmed, Ndiaye 5

Khalifa Sports City Arena

1 August 2025
18:00

Boxscore

Kuwait	69–72	Qatar B
Scoring by quarter: 17–18, 23–21, 17–16, 12–17
Pts: Adnan Hasan 25; Rebs: Al-Shammari 11; Asts: Al-Baloushi 8		Pts: Janjić 24; Rebs: Arfa 11; Asts: Moosa 9

Khalifa Sports City Arena

1 August 2025
20:00

[ Boxscore]

Algeria	70–69	Bahrain
Scoring by quarter: 13–10, 18–23, 17–24, 22–12
Pts: Alain, Sedoud 12; Rebs: Ben Zaim 12; Asts: Briki 6		Pts: Sampson 21; Rebs: Chism, Sampson 10; Asts: three players 3

Khalifa Sports City Arena

2 August 2025
16:00

Boxscore

Qatar B	72–79	Tunisia
Scoring by quarter: 14–22, 17–29, 22–18, 19–10
Pts: Janjić 32; Rebs: Arfa 11; Asts: Janjić, Moosa 5		Pts: Marnaoui 21; Rebs: Ochi 9 Asts: Abada 5

Khalifa Sports City Arena

2 August 2025
18:00

Boxscore

Egypt U23	70–78	Algeria
Scoring by quarter: 12–17, 16–15, 27–21, 15–25
Pts: Moa. Tareq 18; Rebs: three players 6 Asts: Amin 6		Pts: Sedoud 25; Rebs: Ben Zaim 8 Asts: Briki 5

Khalifa Sports City Arena

2 August 2025
20:00

Boxscore

Kuwait	74–89	Bahrain
Scoring by quarter: 15–22, 21–16, 21–26, 17–25
Pts: Al-Shammari 28; Rebs: Al-Shammari, Al-Hamidi 7 Asts: Asadallah 5		Pts: Husain Ali 21; Rebs: Chism 15; Asts: Husain Ali 8

Khalifa Sports City Arena

== Statistics and awards ==
=== Statistical leaders ===
==== Players ====
Points

Name	PPG
(Bahrain) JaKarr Sampson	25.4
(United Arab Emirates) DeMarco Dickerson	24.8
(Qatar) Dejan Janjić	24.0
(Bahrain) Mustafa Husain Ali	21.5
(Qatar) Abdulla Moosa	16.2

Rebounds

Name	RPG
(Bahrain) JaKarr Sampson	8.2
(Tunisia) Yacine Toumi	8.2
(United Arab Emirates) Qais Al-Shabebi	7.7
(Bahrain) Wayne Chism	7.7
(Algeria) Sid Ali Ben Zaim	7.5

Assists

Name	APG
(Kuwait) Ahmed Al-Baloushi	6.8
(Egypt) Ebrahim Amin	6.7
(Tunisia) Omar Abada	6.2
(United Arab Emirates) DeMarco Dickerson	6.2
(Algeria) Sofiane Briki	5.7

Blocks

Name	BPG
(Qatar) Oussama Arfa	4.2
(Qatar) Owen Ikenna Amah	1.5
(Egypt) Abdulrahman Khaled	1.5
(Bahrain) Somto Patrick Onoduenyi	1.5
(United Arab Emirates) Mamadou Ndiaye	1.3

Steals

Name	SPG
(Qatar) Dejan Janjić	2.8
(Bahrain) Ali Jaber	2.0
(United Arab Emirates) DeMarco Dickerson	1.8
(United Arab Emirates) Abdulaziz Ahmed	1.7
(Egypt) Ebrahim Amin	1.5
(Algeria) Sofiane Briki	1.5
(Tunisia) Yacine Toumi	1.5

Efficiency

Name	EFFPG
(Tunisia) Omar Abada	13.2
(Algeria) Sofiane Briki	11.8
(Algeria) Moussaab Koob	10.5
(Tunisia) Bilel Jaziri	9.2
(Tunisia) Yacine Toumi	8.8

== See also ==
- 2025 Arab Women's Basketball Championship
