= Rashaad Singleton =

American basketball player (born 1987)

ES Radès
- Position: Center
- League: Championnat National A

Personal information
- Born: May 22, 1987 (age 39) St. Marys, Georgia, U.S.
- Listed height: 7 ft 0 in (2.13 m)
- Listed weight: 257 lb (117 kg)

Career information
- High school: Graceville (Graceville, Florida)
- College: Georgia (2005–2009)
- NBA draft: 2009: undrafted
- Playing career: 2009–present

Career history
- 2009–2010: Oita Heat Devils
- 2010–2011: ASU
- 2011–2012: Sendai 89ers
- 2012: Panteras de Aguascalientes
- 2013: Singapore Slingers
- 2013–2014: Al Morog
- 2014: Al-Wakrah
- 2015: Gigantes de Carolina
- 2015: Indios de Mayagüez
- 2017: TGE
- 2020–2021: Ezzahra Sports
- 2021–present: ES Radès

Donald Rashaad Singleton (born May 22, 1987) is an American basketball player who plays for ES Radès of the Championnat National A. Standing at 7 ft 0 in (2.13 m), he plays as center. Singleton played four seasons of college basketball for Georgia, before turning professionally in 2009.

== Career ==
On March 7, 2013, Singleton signed with the Singapore Slingers of the ASEAN Basketball League. He averaged 11.8 points and 10.4 rebounds per game in 11 ABL games.

In August 2013, Singleton signed in Japan with the Shimane Susanoo Magic. However, he left the team on August 22, before playing a game.

For the 2013–14 season, he signed with Al Morog in Libya. Here, he averaged 20.8 points, 17.4 rebounds and 4.2 blocks per game.

In November 2014, Singleton signed with Al-Wakrah SC in Qatar.

In February 2020, Singleton signed with GNBC in Madagascar to play in the inaugural season of the Basketball Africa League (BAL). However, the season was postponed due to the COVID-19 pandemic.
