= Novović =

Novović is a surname. Notable people with the surname include:

- Ivan Novović (born 1989), Montenegrin footballer
- Marijan Novović (1947–2013), Serbian basketball player and coach
