= ANBC =

ANBC may refer to:

- CNBC Asia, formerly ANBC, a television channel
- Antrim and Newtownabbey Borough Council
- Arab Nations Basketball Championship
