= Ahmed Addami =

Tunisian basketball player

No. 41 – US Monastir
- Position: Power forward / center
- League: Championnat National A

Personal information
- Born: 14 July 1997 (age 29) Kairouan, Tunisia
- Listed height: 2.03 m (6 ft 8 in)

Career information
- NBA draft: 2019: undrafted
- Playing career: 2016–present

Career history
- 2016–2020: JS Kairouan
- 2020–2022: Club Africain
- 2021–2022: →Ezzahra Sports
- 2022–present: US Monastir

Ahmed Addami (born 14 July 1997) is a Tunisian professional basketball player for US Monastir and the Tunisian national team.

He represented Tunisia at the FIBA AfroBasket 2021, where the team won the gold medal.
