= Ziyed Chennoufi =

Tunisian basketball player (born 1988)

No. 4 – US Monastir
- Position: Small forward
- League: Championnat National A

Personal information
- Born: 29 November 1988 (age 37) Hagen, Germany
- Listed height: 2.00 m (6 ft 7 in)
- Listed weight: 100 kg (220 lb)

Career information
- Playing career: 2006–present

Career history
- 2006–2008: Phoenix Hagen
- 2008–2010: BSG Ludwigsburg
- 2008–2011: →Kirchheim Knights
- 2011–2014: Étoile Sportive du Sahel
- 2014–2017: Club Africain
- 2017–2020: Étoile Sportive de Radès
- 2020–2022: Ezzahra Sports
- 2022–present: US Monastir
Medals
Men's basketball
Representing Tunisia
AfroBasket
| Gold medal – first place | 2017 Tunisia/Senegal |
| Gold medal – first place | 2021 Rwanda |

Ziyed Chennoufi (born November 29, 1988) is a German-Tunisian basketball player for US Monastir and the Tunisian national team.

He participated at the AfroBasket 2017.
