= FIBA Africa Championship 1970 =

1970 FIBA AfroBasket
5th FIBA African Basketball Championship

Tournament details
- Host country: Egypt
- Dates: 9–15 March
- Teams: 7 (from 33 federations)
- Venue: 1 (in 1 host city)

Final positions
- Champions: Egypt (3rd title)

The FIBA Africa Championship 1970, was the fifth FIBA Africa Championship regional basketball championship held by FIBA Africa, which also served as Africa qualifier for the 1970 FIBA World Championship, granting one berth to the champion. It was held in Egypt between 9 March and 15 March 1970. Seven national teams entered the event under the auspices of FIBA Africa, the sport's regional governing body. The city of Alexandria hosted the tournament. Egypt won their third title after defeating Senegal in the final.

== Format ==
- Teams were split into two round-robin groups of four and three teams. The top two teams from each group advanced to the knockout semi-finals. The winners in the semi-finals competed for the championship, while the losing teams from the semifinals competed for third place in an extra game. The champion qualified for the 1970 FIBA World Championship.
- The third teams from each group played an extra game to define fifth and sixth place in the final standings. The bottom team from the four-team group was placed seventh in the final standings.

== First round ==
Advanced to the semi-finals

=== Group A ===
Team	Pld	W	L	PF	PA	PD	Pts
Egypt	3	3	0	306	178	+128	6
Central African Republic	3	2	1	283	194	+89	5
Palestine	3	1	2	216	281	−65	4
Somalia	3	0	3	163	315	−152	3

Egypt	112–53	Palestine
Scoring by half: 54–24, 58–29

Somalia	45–107	Central African Republic
Scoring by half: 22–63, 23–44

Somalia	71–104	Palestine
Scoring by half: 32–55, 39–49

Egypt	90–78	Central African Republic
Scoring by half: 42–42, 48–36

Somalia	47–104	Egypt
Scoring by half: 18–46, 29–58

Palestine	59–98	Central African Republic
Scoring by half: 31–46, 28–52

=== Group B ===
Team	Pld	W	L	PF	PA	PD	Pts
Senegal	2	2	0	107	83	+24	4
Tunisia	2	1	1	119	85	+34	3
Libya	2	0	2	85	143	−58	2

Senegal	44–39	Tunisia
Scoring by half: 19–18, 25–21

Libya	41–80	Tunisia
Scoring by half: 20–48, 21–32

Libya	44–63	Senegal
Scoring by half: 22–32, 22–31

== Knockout stage ==
=== Championship bracket ===
Semi-finals
March 14
Egypt	79
Tunisia	76
March 14
Senegal	66
Central African Republic	57

Final
March 15
Egypt	70
Senegal	63
Third place
March 15
Tunisia	73
Central African Republic	56

=== Semifinals ===
Central African Republic	57–66	Senegal
Scoring by half: 24–37, 33–29

Egypt	79–76	Tunisia
Scoring by half: 39–40, 40–36

=== Third place ===
Central African Republic	56–73	Tunisia
Scoring by half: 26–30, 30–43

=== Final ===
Egypt	70–63	Senegal
Scoring by half: 35–29, 35–34

== Fifth place ==
Palestine	55–78	Libya
Scoring by half: 31–30, 24–48

== Final standings ==
Qualified for the 1970 FIBA World Championship

Rank	Team	Record
1st place, gold medalist(s)	Egypt	5–0
2nd place, silver medalist(s)	Senegal	3–1
3rd place, bronze medalist(s)	Tunisia	2–2
4	Central African Republic	2–3
5	Libya	1–2
6	Palestine	1–3
7	Somalia	0–3
