= Tunisia men's national basketball team =

Men's national basketball team representing Tunisia

Tunisia
- FIBA ranking: 50 ▲1 (1 September 2026)
- Joined FIBA: 1956
- FIBA zone: FIBA Africa
- National federation: FTBB
- Coach: Adel Tlatli
- Nickname(s): نسور قرطاج (Eagles of Carthage)

Olympic Games
- Appearances: 1

FIBA World Cup
- Appearances: 2

AfroBasket
- Appearances: 24
- Medals: (gold) Gold: (2011, 2017, 2021); (silver) Silver: (1965); (bronze) Bronze: (1970, 1974, 2009, 2015)

African Games
- Appearances: 4
- Medals: (gold) Gold: (1973); (bronze) Bronze: (1978)

Arab Championship
- Appearances: 14
- Medals: (gold) Gold: (1981, 1983, 2008, 2009); (silver) Silver: (2022, 2025); (bronze) Bronze: (1991, 1992, 2002, 2007, 2023)
| Home | Away |

First international
- Tunisia 77–68 Morocco (Beirut, Lebanon; 1957)

Biggest win
- Tunisia 101–40 Chad (Yaoundé, Cameroon; 25 November 2017)

Biggest defeat
- Tunisia 36–93 France (Pau, France; 31 July 2023)
Medal record
| Event | 1st | 2nd | 3rd |
|---|---|---|---|
| AfroBasket | 3 | 1 | 4 |
| African Games | 1 | 0 | 1 |
| Arab Championship | 4 | 1 | 4 |
| Pan Arab Games | 0 | 0 | 3 |
| Mediterranean Games | 0 | 0 | 1 |
| Stanković Cup | 0 | 1 | 2 |
| Total | 8 | 3 | 15 |

The Tunisia men's national basketball team (Arabic: منتخب تونس لكرة السلة), nicknamed The Eagles of Carthage, represents Tunisia in international basketball. The team is governed by the Tunisia Basketball Federation (FTBB). To date, it has taken part in the regional championship the AfroBasket 23 times. In terms of the number of successful performances, it is inferior to the traditionally strong teams of Senegal, Côte d'Ivoire, and Egypt. In 2011, the Tunisian national team became the champion of Africa for the first time in its history, defeating the Angola team in the AfroBasket 2011 final. The team's previous success was silver at the home Africa Championship 1965. The team also won bronze medals in the 1970, 1974, 2009 and 2015 competitions.

Despite fairly successful performances (the Tunisian national team never finished lower than eighth), the team was unable to repeat or even come close to the successes of the 1970s. The success of the 2009 was quite unexpected, when the team took third place at the AfroBasket 2009. Following the results of the draw, forward Amine Rzig was included in the symbolic team of the tournament, and the team in the preliminary round won 4 games with two defeats, but in three matches the Tunisian team won with a difference of two or one point. Tunisia reached the quarter-finals for the first time since 1974, where they defeated Mali by one point. And although Tunisia lost to Angola in the semi-finals, Cameroon was beaten in the bronze medal match, and the Tunisian team automatically qualified for the 2010 FIBA World Championship in Turkey. This was also the first time in the team's history that they qualified for the FIBA Basketball World Cup. However, the team performed poorly at the World Cup, losing all five matches in Group B and eventually finishing in 24th place. In 2017 as co-hosts, Tunisia won its second AfroBasket trophy by beating Nigeria 77–65 in the final. It retains its title in 2021 by beating Ivory Coast in the final with a score of 78–75.

At the Arab level, Tunisia participated in the Arab Basketball Championship 14 times, won the title four times in 1981, 1983, 2008, 2009, while it came in second place in 2022 and 2025 and third place five times, the last of which was in 2023.

== History ==
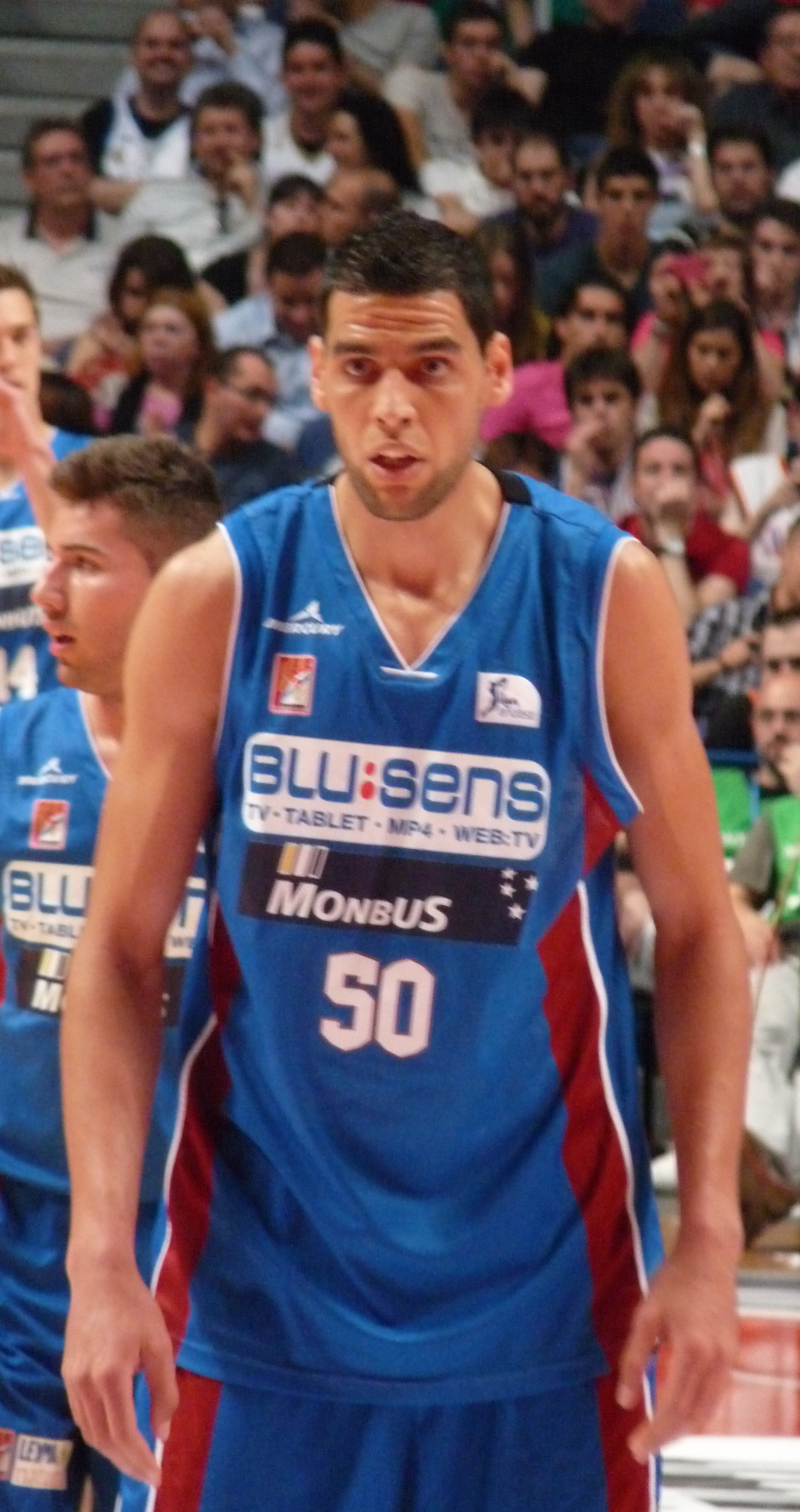
Salah Mejri is the country's most recognized player

In 2011, they won their first ever FIBA Africa Championship, after beating Angola in the final. Their previous best finish was at the FIBA Africa Championship 1965, when they won the silver medal as the host country. They also won a bronze medal at the FIBA Africa Championship 1970 and FIBA Africa Championship 1974.

Although the Tunisians never finished worse than eighth in any of their succeeding appearances, they were not able to break onto the podium again until a surprise bronze medal run at the FIBA Africa Championship 2009. Led by All-Tournament First Team forward Amine Rzig, the Tunisians went 4–2 in the preliminary rounds, winning three games by two points or less. They reached the semi-finals for only the second time since 1974, by another slim margin – this time a one-point victory over Mali. Although they were defeated by Angola in the semi-finals, the Tunisians topped Cameroon in the bronze medal game, to claim Africa's third and final automatic berth in the 2010 FIBA World Championship – its first ever FIBA World Cup berth. The Tunisians struggled to compete in the World Championship, losing all five of their games, and finishing last in Group B, and 24th overall. Yet, after almost forty years of mediocrity in Africa, Tunisia has become noted as one of the continent's prime competitors again. Its appearances at the global stage have marked a new milestone in the team's history.

== Honours ==
=== Official competitions ===
- AfroBasket

(gold) Champions: 2011, 2017, 2021
(silver) Runner-up: 1965
(bronze) Third place: 1970, 1974, 2009, 2015

- African Games

(gold) Champions: 1973
(bronze) Third place: 1978

- Arab Championship

(gold) Champions: 1981, 1983, 2008, 2009
(silver) Runner-up: 2022, 2025
(bronze) Third place: 1991, 1992, 2002, 2007, 2023

- Pan Arab Games

(bronze) Third place: 1957, 1985, 1992

- Mediterranean Games

Third place: 2013

=== Minor competitions ===
- FIBA Stanković Cup

(silver) Runner-up: 2018
(bronze) Third place: 2012, 2019

- King Abdullah II International Cup

(gold) Champions: 2008
(silver) Runner-up: 2004, 2007, 2011
(bronze) Third place: 2003, 2021

- Czech Republic Basketball Tournament

(silver) Runner-up: 2019

=== Awards ===
- AfroBasket Most Valuable Player

2011: Salah Mejri
2021: Makram Ben Romdhane

- AfroBasket All-Tournament Team

2009: Amine Rzig
2011: Marouan Kechrid, Makrem Ben Romdhane, Salah Mejri
2015: Makram Ben Romdhane (2)
2017: Mourad El Mabrouk, Mohamed Hdidane
2021: Omar Abada, Makram Ben Romdhane (3)

== Competitive record ==
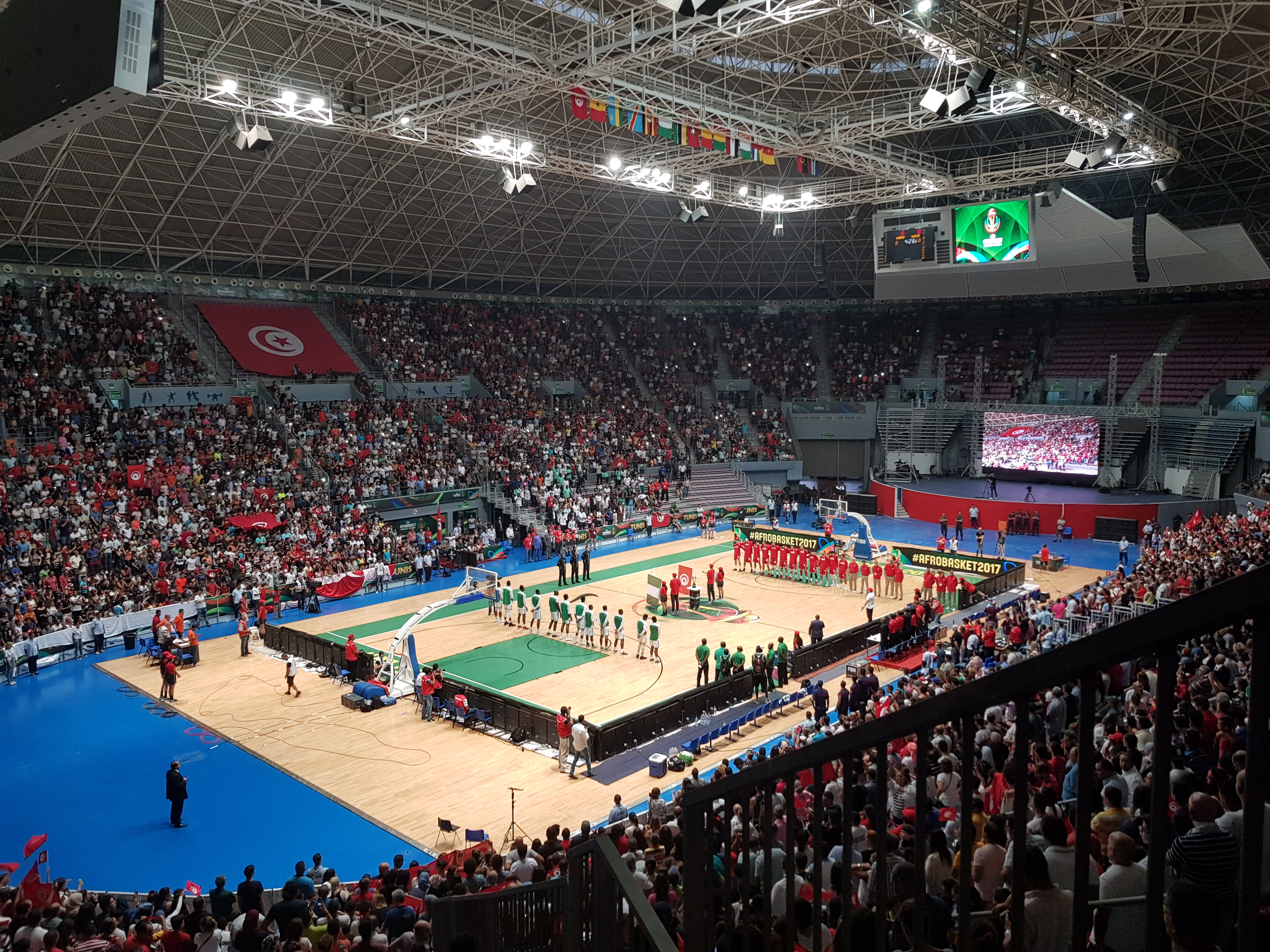
Tunisia against Nigeria at the FIBA AfroBasket 2017 final.

Unlike other team sports, where Tunisia is well positioned at the regional level, the Tunisian men's basketball team has not managed to expand its list of trophies even if at the continental level it can consider among the most awarded countries. Finalist of the African championship held in home in 1965, four times third and twice fourth, Tunisia did not succeed in becoming African champion of the discipline until 2011 without however maintaining its rank since, during the following edition, it is relegated to ninth place.

At the Arab level, the prize list is more extensive with four champion titles, in 1981, 1983, 2008 and 2009, a second place and three third places. On 28 August 2011, the team won the AfroBasket for the first time after defeating Angola 67–56 in the final and qualified for the 2012 Summer Olympics. In 2017 as co-hosts, Tunisia won its second AfroBasket by beating Nigeria 77–65 in the final. It retains its title in 2021 by beating Ivory Coast in the final with a score of 78–75. On 16 February 2022, Tunisia lost the final of the 2022 Arab Championship against Lebanon 69–72 in the United Arab Emirates.

Champions Runners up Third place Fourth place

- Red border color indicates tournament was held on home soil.

=== Olympic Games ===
Olympic Games
| Year | Round | Position | GP | W | L | PF | PA | PD |
|---|---|---|---|---|---|---|---|---|
| (Nazi Germany) 1936 | Part of France | | | | | | | |
| (United Kingdom) 1948 | Part of France | | | | | | | |
| (Finland) 1952 | Part of France | | | | | | | |
| (Australia) 1956 | Did not qualify | | | | | | | |
| (Italy) 1960 | Did not qualify | | | | | | | |
| (Japan) 1964 | Did not qualify | | | | | | | |
| (Mexico) 1968 | Did not qualify | | | | | | | |
| (West Germany) 1972 | Did not qualify | | | | | | | |
| (Canada) 1976 | Did not qualify | | | | | | | |
| (Soviet Union) 1980 | Did not qualify | | | | | | | |
| (United States) 1984 | Did not qualify | | | | | | | |
| (South Korea) 1988 | Did not qualify | | | | | | | |
| (Spain) 1992 | Did not qualify | | | | | | | |
| (United States) 1996 | Did not qualify | | | | | | | |
| (Australia) 2000 | Did not qualify | | | | | | | |
| (Greece) 2004 | Did not qualify | | | | | | | |
| (China) 2008 | Did not qualify | | | | | | | |
| (United Kingdom) 2012 | Group stage | 11th | 5 | 0 | 5 | 320 | 411 | −91 |
| (Brazil) 2016 | Did not qualify | | | | | | | |
| (Japan) 2020 | Did not qualify | | | | | | | |
| (France) 2024 | Did not qualify | | | | | | | |
| Total | Group stage | 1/18 | 5 | 0 | 5 | 320 | 411 | −91 |

=== FIBA World Cup ===
World Cup
| Year | Round | Position | GP | W | L | PF | PA | PD |
|---|---|---|---|---|---|---|---|---|
| (Argentina) 1950 | Part of France | | | | | | | |
| (Brazil) 1954 | Part of France | | | | | | | |
| (Chile) 1959 | Did not qualify | | | | | | | |
| (Brazil) 1963 | Did not qualify | | | | | | | |
| (Uruguay) 1967 | Did not qualify | | | | | | | |
| (Socialist Federal Republic of Yugoslavia) 1970 | Did not qualify | | | | | | | |
| (Puerto Rico) 1974 | Did not qualify | | | | | | | |
| (Philippines) 1978 | Did not qualify | | | | | | | |
| (Colombia) 1982 | Did not qualify | | | | | | | |
| (Spain) 1986 | Did not qualify | | | | | | | |
| (Argentina) 1990 | Did not qualify | | | | | | | |
| (Canada) 1994 | Did not qualify | | | | | | | |
| (Greece) 1998 | Did not qualify | | | | | | | |
| (United States) 2002 | Did not qualify | | | | | | | |
| (Japan) 2006 | Did not qualify | | | | | | | |
| (Turkey) 2010 | Group stage | 24th | 5 | 0 | 5 | 300 | 407 | −107 |
| (Spain) 2014 | Did not qualify | | | | | | | |
| (China) 2019 | Group stage | 20th | 5 | 3 | 2 | 377 | 386 | −9 |
| (Philippines) (Japan) (Indonesia) 2023 | Did not qualify | | | | | | | |
| (Qatar) 2027 | To be determined | | | | | | | |
| (France) 2031 | To be determined | | | | | | | |
| Total | Group stage | 2/18 | 10 | 3 | 7 | 677 | 793 | −116 |

=== AfroBasket ===
AfroBasket
| Year | Round | Position | GP | W | L | PF | PA | PD |
|---|---|---|---|---|---|---|---|---|
| (Egypt) 1962 | Did not enter | | | | | | | |
| (Morocco) 1964 | Fourth place | 4th | 5 | 2 | 3 | 300 | 297 | +3 |
| (Tunisia) 1965 | Runners-up | 2nd | 4 | 2 | 2 | 212 | 217 | −5 |
| (Morocco) 1968 | Did not enter | | | | | | | |
| (Egypt) 1970 | Third place | 3rd | 4 | 2 | 2 | 268 | 220 | +48 |
| (Senegal) 1972 | Group stage | 5th | 6 | 4 | 2 | 482 | 398 | +84 |
| (Central African Republic) 1974 | Third place | 3rd | 6 | 4 | 2 | 471 | 451 | +20 |
| (Egypt) 1975 | Classification stage | 5th | 5 | 0 | 5 | 411 | 426 | −15 |
| (Senegal) 1978 | Did not enter | | | | | | | |
| (Morocco) 1980 | Did not enter | | | | | | | |
| (Somalia) 1981 | Classification stage | 6th | 5 | 3 | 2 | 295 | 355 | −60 |
| (Egypt) 1983 | Did not enter | | | | | | | |
| (Ivory Coast) 1985 | Classification stage | 8th | 6 | 2 | 4 | 402 | 467 | −65 |
| (Tunisia) 1987 | Classification stage | 5th | 4 | 2 | 2 | 292 | 294 | −2 |
| (Angola) 1989 | Classification stage | 8th | 6 | 2 | 4 | 488 | 512 | −24 |
| (Egypt) 1992 | Classification stage | 7th | 5 | 1 | 4 | 284 | 308 | −24 |
| (Kenya) 1993 | Classification stage | 8th | 5 | 1 | 4 | 410 | 451 | −41 |
| (Algeria) 1995 | Did not enter | | | | | | | |
| (Senegal) 1997 | Did not enter | | | | | | | |
| (Angola) 1999 | Classification stage | 5th | 6 | 4 | 2 | 314 | 309 | +5 |
| (Morocco) 2001 | Fourth place | 4th | 7 | 4 | 3 | 536 | 522 | +14 |
| (Egypt) 2003 | Classification stage | 6th | 6 | 3 | 3 | 433 | 389 | +44 |
| (Algeria) 2005 | Quarter-finals | 8th | 8 | 2 | 6 | 527 | 529 | −2 |
| (Angola) 2007 | Quarter-finals | 6th | 6 | 3 | 3 | 428 | 415 | +13 |
| (Libya) 2009 | Third place | 3rd | 9 | 6 | 3 | 659 | 641 | +18 |
| (Madagascar) 2011 | Champions | 1st | 7 | 7 | 0 | 544 | 375 | +169 |
| (Ivory Coast) 2013 | Round of 16 | 9th | 5 | 4 | 1 | 382 | 311 | +71 |
| (Tunisia) 2015 | Third place | 3rd | 7 | 6 | 1 | 484 | 425 | +59 |
| (Tunisia) (Senegal) 2017 | Champions | 1st | 6 | 6 | 0 | 428 | 347 | +81 |
| (Rwanda) 2021 | Champions | 1st | 6 | 6 | 0 | 470 | 383 | +87 |
| (Angola) 2025 | Round of 16 | 12th | 4 | 1 | 3 | 266 | 320 | −54 |
| Total | 3 Titles | 24/31 | 138 | 77 | 61 | 9786 | 9362 | +424 |

=== AfroCan ===
AfroCan
| Year | Round | Position | GP | W | L | PF | PA | PD |
|---|---|---|---|---|---|---|---|---|
| (Mali) 2019 | Quarterfinals | 7th | 5 | 3 | 2 | 356 | 339 | +17 |
| (Angola) 2023 | Quarterfinals | 5th | 5 | 4 | 1 | 335 | 306 | +29 |
| (Rwanda) 2027 | To be determined | | | | | | | |
| Total | Quarterfinals | 2/3 | 10 | 7 | 3 | 691 | 645 | +46 |

=== Other records ===
| Tournament | Round | Position | GP | W | L | PF | PA | PD |
|---|---|---|---|---|---|---|---|---|
| (Lebanon) 1957 Pan Arab Games | Third place | 3rd | – | – | – | – | – | – |
| (Nigeria) 1973 African Games | Champions | 1st | – | – | – | – | – | – |
| (Algeria) 1978 African Games | Third place | 3rd | – | – | – | – | – | – |
| (Tunisia) 1981 Arab Championship | Champions | 1st | – | – | – | – | – | – |
| (Jordan) 1983 Arab Championship | Champions | 1st | – | – | – | – | – | – |
| (Morocco) 1985 Pan Arab Games | Third place | 3rd | – | – | – | – | – | – |
| (Egypt) 1991 Arab Championship | Third place | 3rd | – | – | – | – | – | – |
| (Syria) 1992 Arab Championship | Third place | 3rd | – | – | – | – | – | – |
| (Syria) 1992 Pan Arab Games | Third place | 3rd | – | – | – | – | – | – |
| (Egypt) 2002 Arab Championship | Third place | 3rd | – | – | – | – | – | – |
| (Jordan) 2003 King's Cup | Third place | 3rd | – | – | – | – | – | – |
| (Jordan) 2004 King's Cup | Runners-up | 2nd | – | – | – | – | – | – |
| (Jordan) 2007 King's Cup | Runners-up | 2nd | – | – | – | – | – | – |
| (Egypt) 2007 Arab Championship | Third place | 3rd | – | – | – | – | – | – |
| (Tunisia) 2008 Arab Championship | Champions | 1st | – | – | – | – | – | – |
| (Jordan) 2008 King's Cup | Champions | 1st | – | – | – | – | – | – |
| (Morocco) 2009 Arab Championship | Champions | 1st | – | – | – | – | – | – |
| (Jordan) 2011 King's Cup | Runners-up | 2nd | – | – | – | – | – | – |
| (China) 2012 Stanković Cup | Third place | 3rd | 4 | 2 | 2 | 249 | 259 | –10 |
| (Turkey) 2013 Mediterranean Games | Third place | 3rd | 4 | 2 | 2 | 273 | 258 | +15 |
| (China) 2018 Stanković Cup | Runners-up | 2nd | – | – | – | – | – | – |
| (China) 2019 Stanković Cup | Third place | 3rd | – | – | – | – | – | – |
| 2019 Czech Republic Tournament | Runners-up | 2nd | – | – | – | – | – | – |
| (Jordan) 2021 King's Cup | Third place | 3rd | – | – | – | – | – | – |
| (United Arab Emirates) 2022 Arab Championship | Runners-up | 2nd | 5 | 4 | 1 | 357 | 298 | +59 |
| (Egypt) 2023 Arab Championship | Third place | 3rd | 7 | 5 | 2 | 524 | 511 | +13 |
| (Bahrain) 2025 Arab Championship | Runners-up | 2nd | 6 | 5 | 1 | 506 | 448 | +58 |

== Team ==
=== Current roster ===
Team for the 2025 FIBA AfroBasket.

Tunisia men's national basketball team roster
Players
Coaches

| Pos. | No. | Name | Age – Date of birth | Height | Club | Ctr. |
|---|---|---|---|---|---|---|
| PG | 4 | Omar Abada | 32 – 20 April 1993 | 1.89 m (6 ft 2 in) | Club Africain | (Tunisia) |
| G | 6 | Achref Gannouni (C) | 28 – 16 April 1997 | 1.92 m (6 ft 4 in) | Club Africain | (Tunisia) |
| G | 7 | Oussama Marnaoui | 26 – 16 June 1999 | 1.93 m (6 ft 4 in) | JS Kairouan | (Tunisia) |
| PG | 8 | Bilel Jaziri | 27 – 25 March 1998 | 1.92 m (6 ft 4 in) | US Monastir | (Tunisia) |
| SG | 9 | Jawhar Jawadi | 28 – 14 July 1997 | 1.92 m (6 ft 4 in) | Club Africain | (Tunisia) |
| PF | 10 | Yacine Toumi | 24 – 12 October 2000 | 2.04 m (6 ft 8 in) | Seton Hall Pirates | (United States) |
| C | 13 | Bechir Ben Yahia | 27 – 1 May 1998 | 2.05 m (6 ft 9 in) | US Monastir | (Tunisia) |
| F | 15 | Wassef Methnani | 27 – 7 August 1998 | 2.00 m (6 ft 7 in) | JS Kairouan | (Tunisia) |
| PG | 20 | Mehdi Seyeh | 34 – 4 September 1990 | 1.82 m (6 ft 0 in) | US Monastir | (Tunisia) |
| F | 21 | Mohamed Abbassi | 34 – 28 March 1991 | 2.04 m (6 ft 8 in) | JS Kairouan | (Tunisia) |
| PF | 32 | Ahmed Addami | 28 – 14 July 1997 | 2.03 m (6 ft 8 in) | JS Kairouan | (Tunisia) |
| C | 99 | Mohamed Fares Ochi | 26 – 8 February 1999 | 2.10 m (6 ft 11 in) | Real Valladolid | (Spain) |

Head coach

- (France) Mehdy Mary

Assistant coach(es)

- (Tunisia) Mourad Bel Hassine

Legend

- (C) Team captain
- Club – describes last
  club before the tournament
- Age – describes age
  on 12 August 2025

=== Past rosters ===
FIBA Africa Championship 1989: finished 8th among 12 teams

4 Chedli Njah, 5 Akran Ben, 6 Mounir Gara-Ali, 7 Lothi Ghrib, 8 Cherif Teleb, 9 Sami Housseini, 10 Salah Ben Mbarek, 11 Moslem Haddad, 12 Skander Nabli, 13 Mortadha Ben, 14 Mounir Nefzi, 15 Chokri Ben Yedder.

FIBA Africa Championship 1992: finished 7th among 12 teams

4 Maher Khenfir, 5 Lothi Ghrib, 6 Aouzi Trabelsi, 7 Sami Housseini, 8 Lamjed N'Jah, 9 Ahdenchmln Trabelsi, 10 Salah Ben Mbarek, 11 Moslem Haddad, 12 Nabil Ben Tini, 13 Houssam Eddine Yousfi, 14 Mounir Nefzi, 15 Chokri Ben Yedder.

FIBA Africa Championship 1993: finished 8th among 12 teams

4 Jilain Mahjoubi, 5 Mohamud Fateh, 6 Aouzi Trabelsi, 7 Lothi Ghrib, 8 Nahil Aquij, 9 Ahdenchmln Trabelsi, 10 Sami Housseini, 11 Mounir Graali, 12 Anis Hantous, 13 Walid Ben Taieb, 14 Mounir Nefzi, 15 Chokri Ben Yedder.

FIBA Africa Championship 1999: finished 5th among 12 teams

4 Habib el-Ouaer, 5 Slim Rajhi, 6 Walid Ben Taieb, 7 Sami Housseini, 8 Atef Maoua, 9 Wassef Kechrid, 10 Ali Amri, 11 Madji Boulaabi, 12 Sofiane Tebbini, 13 Amor Bouzarod, 14 Madji Essalaoui, 15 Madji Maalaoui.

2001 FIBA Africa Championship: finished 4th among 12 teams

4 Habib el-Ouaer, 5 Ali Amri, 6 Mehdj Mahmoud, 7 Atef Maoua, 8 Lamjed N'Jah, 9 Marouan Kechrid, 10 Madji Boulaabi, 11 Radhouane Slimane, 12 Souhaiel Kechrid, 13 Walid Ben Taieb, 14 Heithem Sayed, 15 Madji Maalaoui (Coach: Adel Tlatli)

2003 FIBA Africa Championship: finished 6th among 12 teams

Haythem Essayed, Maher Khanfir, Amine Rzig, Rached Ben Mabrouk, Ali Amri, Mourad Ben Hassine, Atef Maoua, Issam Ben Douissa, Radhouane Slimane, Walid Bouslama, Fouad Stiti, Khaled Yahiaoui (Coach: Marijan Novović)

2005 FIBA Africa Championship: finished 6th among 12 teams

4 Radhouane Slimane, 5 Ali el-Amri, 6 Oussama ben Lofti Ferjani, 7 Naim Dhifallah, 8 Oualid Bouslama, 9 Marouan Kechrid, 10 Maher Khenfir, 11 Marouen Lahmar, 12 Atef Maoua, 13 Fouhed Stiti, 14 Samy Ouellani, 15 Mejdi Maalaoui (Coach: Adel Tlatli)

AfroBasket 2007: finished 6th among 16 teams

4 Radhouane Slimane, 5 Ali el-Amri, 6 Nizar Knioua, 7 Naim Dhifallah, 8 Marouan Laghnej, 9 Fouhed Stiti, 10 Atef Maoua, 11 Walid Dhouibi, 12 Omar Mouhli, 13 Amine Rzig, 14 Hamdi Braa, 15 Mejdi Maalaoui (Coach: Adel Tlatli)

AfroBasket 2009: finished 3rd (bronze) among 16 teams

4 Mokhtar Ghyaza, 5 Marouen Lahmar, 6 Nizar Knioua, 7 Naim Dhifallah, 8 Marouan Kechrid, 9 Mohamed Hdidane, 10 Atef Maoua, 11 Makram Ben Romdhane, 12 Anis Hedidane, 13 Amine Rzig, 14 Hamdi Braa, 15 Salah Mejri (Coach: Adel Tlatli)

2010 FIBA World Championship: finished 24th among 24 teams

4 Radhouane Slimane, 5 Marouan Laghnej, 6 Nizar Knioua, 7 Naim Dhifallah, 8 Marouan Kechrid, 9 Mohamed Hdidane, 10 Atef Maoua, 11 Mokhtar Ghyaza, 12 Makrem Ben Romdhane, 13 Amine Rzig, 14 Hamdi Braa, 15 Salah Mejri (Coach: Adel Tlatli)

AfroBasket 2011: finished 1st (gold) among 16 teams

4 Radhouane Slimane, 5 Marouan Laghnej, 6 Amine Maghrebi, 7 Mourad El Mabrouk, 8 Marouan Kechrid, 9 Mohamed Hdidane, 10 Lassaad Chouaya, 11 Mokhtar Ghyaza, 12 Makram Ben Romdhane, 13 Amine Rzig, 14 Zied Toumi, 15 Salah Mejri (MVP) (Coach: Adel Tlatli)

2012 Summer Olympics: finished 12th among 12 teams

4 Radhouane Slimane, 5 Marouan Laghnej, 6 Nizar Knioua, 7 Mourad El Mabrouk, 8 Marouan Kechrid, 9 Mohamed Hdidane, 10 Mehdi Hafsi, 11 Mokhtar Ghyaza, 12 Makrem Ben Romdhane, 13 Amine Rzig, 14 Youssef Gaddour, 15 Salah Mejri (Coach: Adel Tlatli)

AfroBasket 2013: finished 9th among 16 teams

4 Radhouane Slimane, 5 Ziyed Chennoufi, 6 Nizar Knioua, 7 Mourad El Mabrouk, 8 Marouan Kechrid, 9 Mohamed Hdidane, 10 Omar Mouhli, 11 Mokhtar Ghyaza, 12 Makram Ben Romdhane, 13 Amine Rzig, 14 Lassaad Chouaya, 15 Salah Mejri (Coach: Adel Tlatli)

AfroBasket 2015: finished 3rd (bronze) among 16 teams

4 Omar Abada, 5 Mohamed Abbassi, 6 Nizar Knioua, 7 Mourad El Mabrouk, 8 Mehdi Seyeh, 9 Mohamed Hdidane, 10 Michael Roll, 11 Mokhtar Ghyaza, 12 Makram Ben Romdhane, 13 Amine Rzig, 14 Hamdi Braa, 15 Salah Mejri (Coach: Adel Tlatli)

AfroBasket 2017: finished 1st (gold) among 16 teams

4 Omar Abada, 5 Ziyed Chennoufi, 7 Mourad El Mabrouk, 8 Omar Mouhli, 9 Mohamed Hdidane, 10 Bechir Hdidane, 11 Mokhtar Ghyaza, 12 Makram Ben Romdhane, 23 Firas Lahiani, 28 Mohamed Rassil, 45 Radhouane Slimane, 66 Nizar Knioua (Coach: Mário Palma)

2019 FIBA Basketball World Cup: finished 20th among 23 teams

4 Omar Abada, 5 Ziyed Chennoufi, 7 Mourad El Mabrouk, 8 Omar Mouhli, 9 Mohamed Hdidane, 11 Mokhtar Ghyaza, 12 Makrem Ben Romdhane, 19 Mohamed Abbassi, 20 Michael Roll, 45 Radhouane Slimane, 50 Salah Mejri, 66 Nizar Knioua (Coach: Mário Palma)

AfroBasket 2021: finished 1st (gold) among 16 teams

1 Oussama Marnaoui, 3 Achref Gannouni, 4 Omar Abada, 5 Ziyed Chennoufi, 7 Mourad El Mabrouk, 11 Mokhtar Ghyaza, 12 Makram Ben Romdhane (MVP), 14 Amrou Bouallegue, 20 Michael Roll, 32 Ahmed Addami, 45 Radhouane Slimane, 50 Salah Mejri (Coach: Dirk Bauermann)

AfroBasket 2025: finished 12th among 16 teams

4 Omar Abada, 6 Achref Gannouni, 7 Oussama Marnaoui, 8 Bilel Jaziri, 9 Jawhar Jawadi, 10 Yacine Toumi, 13 Bechir Ben Yahia, 15 Wassef Methnani, 20 Mehdi Seyeh, 21 Mohamed Abbassi, 32 Ahmed Addami, 99 Mohamed Fares Ochi (Coach: Mehdy Mary)

=== Head coaches ===
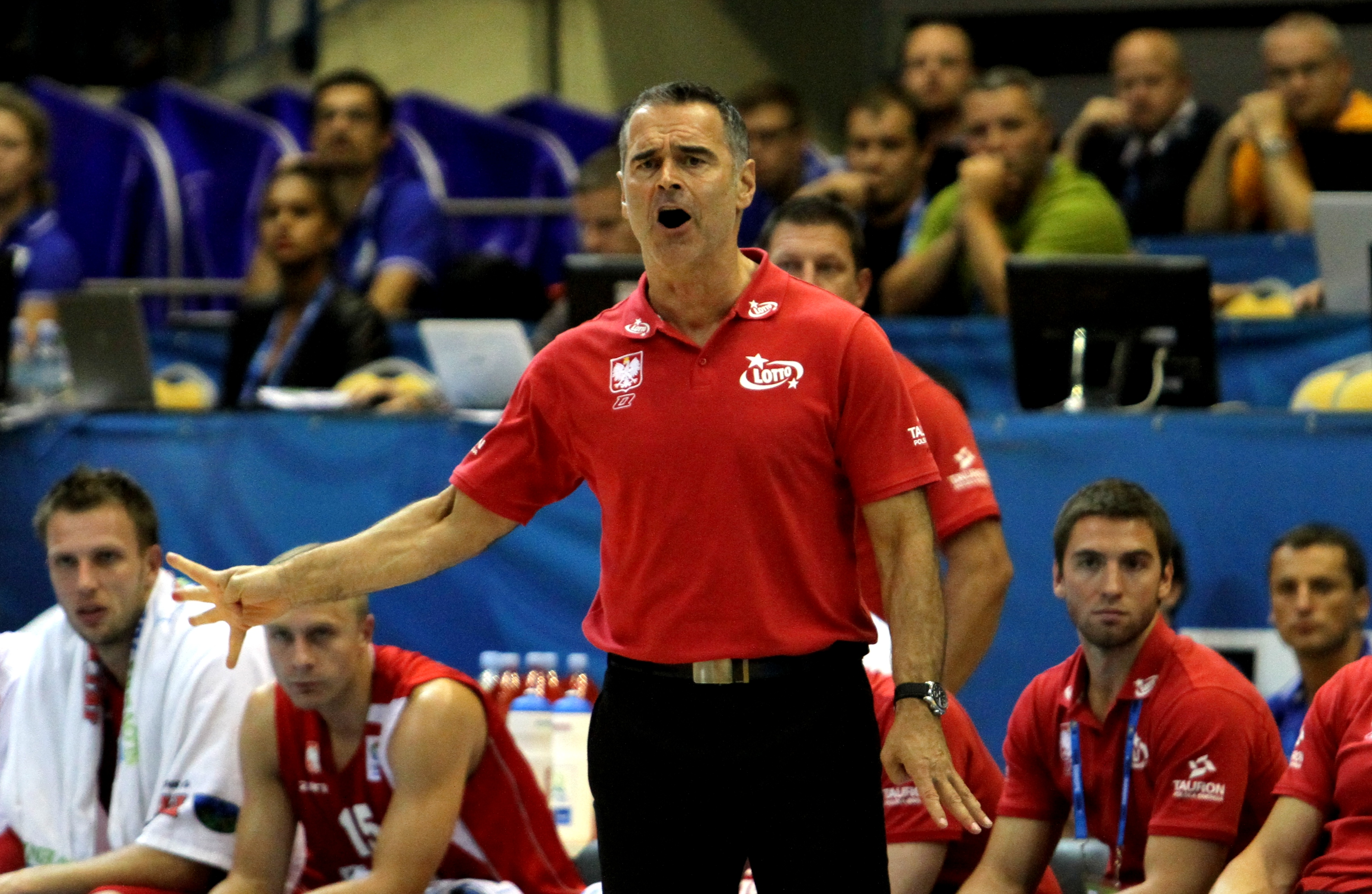
Dirk Bauermann coached the Tunisia between 2020 and 2022. He led the team to win the FIBA AfroBasket 2021 in Rwanda.

- (Tunisia) Hammadi Driss (1957–1959)
- (United States) Griffith (1960–1961)
- (Tunisia) Borhane Errais (1961–1962)
- (Socialist Federal Republic of Yugoslavia) Miodrag Stefanović (1962–1963)
- (Tunisia) Borhane Errais (1963–1965) (2)
- (Poland) Valensky (1965–1966)
- (United States) George Faherty (1966–1967)
- (Poland) Ludmil Katarinsky (1967–1968)
- (Socialist Federal Republic of Yugoslavia) Igor Tocigl (1968–1971)
- (Czechoslovakia) Václav Krása (1971)
- (United States) Bill Sweek (1971–1972)
- (Tunisia) Mohamed Senoussi (1972–1978)
- (Tunisia) Khaled Senoussi (1978–1979)
- (Tunisia) Mohamed Senoussi (1979–1981) (2)
- (Tunisia) Khaled Senoussi (1981) (2)
- (Tunisia) Mohamed Zaouali (1982–1983)
- (Soviet Union) Youri Velligoura (1983–1987)
- (Tunisia) Ridha Laabidi (1988–1990)
- (Tunisia) Mohamed Senoussi (1990–1991) (3)
- (Tunisia) Khaled Senoussi (1991–1992) (3)
- (Tunisia) Mohamed Zaouali (1992–1994)
- (Croatia) Igor Tocigl (1994–1996)
- (Spain) Juan Manuel Monsalve (1997–1998)
- (Tunisia) Mustapha Bouchenak (1998–1999)
- (Bosnia and Herzegovina) Zoran Zupčević (1999–2000)
- (France) Francis Jordane & (Tunisia) Mounir Ben Sliman (2000–2001)
- (Tunisia) Adel Tlatli (2001–2002)
- (Serbia and Montenegro) Marijan Novović (2002–2003)
- (Tunisia) Walid Gharbi (2004)
- (Tunisia) Adel Tlatli (2004–2016) (2)
- (Portugal) Mário Palma (2016–2020)
- (Germany) Dirk Bauermann (2020–2022)
- (Turkey) (France) Erman Kunter (2022–2023)
- (Portugal) Mário Palma (2023) (2)
- (France) Mehdy Mary (2023–2025)
- (Tunisia) Adel Tlatli (2025–present) (3)

== Kit ==
=== Manufacturer ===
2015 – Nike

=== Sponsor ===
2015 – Tunisie Telecom

== See also ==
- Tunisia Basketball Federation
- Tunisia A' national basketball team
- Tunisia men's national under-20 basketball team
- Tunisia men's national under-19 basketball team
- Tunisia men's national under-17 basketball team
- Tunisia men's national 3x3 team
- Tunisia women's national basketball team
- Tunisia women's national under-20 basketball team
- Tunisia women's national under-19 basketball team
- Tunisia women's national under-17 basketball team
- Tunisia women's national 3x3 team
