= Marouan Laghnej =

Tunisian basketball player

No. 10 – JS Kairouan
- Position: Point guard / shooting guard
- League: Championnat National A

Personal information
- Born: April 22, 1986 (age 40) Kairouan, Tunisia
- Listed height: 6 ft 3 in (1.91 m)

Career information
- Playing career: 2005–present

Career history
- 2003–2013: JS Kairouan
- 2014–2016: US Monastir
- 2016–2017: Club Africain
- 2018–present: JS Kairouan
Medals
Men's basketball
Representing Tunisia
African Championships
Gold medal – first place	2011 Madagascar	Tunisia

Marouan Laghnej (born April 22, 1986) is a Tunisian basketball player, currently playing for JS Kairouan of the Tunisian Championnat National A. He is also a former member of the Tunisian national basketball team.

Slimane is a member of the Tunisia national basketball team. He competed at the 2007 FIBA Africa Championship and as a junior in the 2004 FIBA Africa Under-20 Championship. Left off the roster for the FIBA Africa Championship 2009, he replaced Marouen Lahmar for the 2010 World Championship. He was part of Tunisia's team at the 2012 Summer Olympics.
