= Omar Mouhli =

Tunisian basketball player

No. 8 – ES Radès
- Position: Guard
- League: Tunisian League

Personal information
- Born: 19 March 1986 (age 40) Tunis, Tunisia
- Listed height: 1.91 m (6 ft 3 in)
- Listed weight: 85 kg (187 lb)

Career history
- –2007: ÉS Goulettoise
- 2007–2018: Étoile du Sahel
- 2018–2019: ES Radès
- 2019–2020: US Monastir
- 2020–2021: Club Africain
- 2021–2022: Ezzahra Sports
- 2022–present: ES Radès
Medals
Men's basketball
Representing Tunisia
AfroBasket
Gold medal – first place	2017 Tunisia/Senegal

Omar Mouhli (born 19 March 1986) is a Tunisian basketball player for ES Radès and the Tunisian national team.

He participated at the AfroBasket 2017.
