= Arab Basketball Championship =

Regional basketball tournament

- Current season, competition or edition: 2025 Arab Basketball Championship
- Sport: Basketball
- Founded: 1974
- No. of teams: 10
- Country: ABC members
- Continent: ABC (Arab world)
- Most recent champion: Algeria (2 titles)
- Most titles: Egypt (13 titles)

The Arab Basketball Championship for Men (Arabic: البطولة العربية لكرة السلة للرجال) or simply ABC is a regional basketball tournament which takes place every two years between men's national teams of the members of the Arab Basketball Confederation, representing the Arab world.

== Statistics ==
=== Winners ===
Edition	Year	Host	Final			Third-place game		
Edition	Year	Host	Champion	Score	Second Place	Third Place	Score	Fourth Place
1	1974; Details	(Iraq); Baghdad	Egypt	–	Iraq	Lebanon	–	Algeria
2	1975; Details	Kuwait City	Sudan	–	Iraq	Kuwait	–	Somalia
3	1978; Details	(Egypt); Cairo	Egypt	–	Saudi Arabia	Kuwait	–	Bahrain
4	1981; Details	(Tunisia); Tunis	Tunisia	–	Algeria	Mauritania	–	Kuwait
5	1983; Details	(Jordan); Amman	Tunisia	–	Jordan	Iraq	–	Saudi Arabia
6	1985	(Egypt); Cairo	Not held			Not held		
7	1987; Details	(Egypt); Cairo	Egypt	–	Iraq	Jordan	–	United Arab Emirates
8	1989; Details	(Syria); Damascus	Egypt	–	Iraq	Jordan	–	Tunisia
9	1991; Details	(Egypt); Cairo	Egypt	–	Syria	Tunisia	–	Saudi Arabia
10	1992; Details	(Syria); Damascus	Syria	–	Jordan	Tunisia	–	Egypt
11	1994; Details	(Egypt); Cairo	Egypt	No playoffs	Algeria	Syria	No playoffs	United Arab Emirates
12	1997; Details	(Lebanon); Beyrouth	Saudi Arabia	–	Syria	United Arab Emirates	–	Lebanon
13	1999; Details	(Jordan); Amman	Egypt	–	Jordan	Qatar	and	Syria
14	2000; Details	(Algeria); Algiers	Egypt	–	Algeria	Morocco	–	Tunisia
15	2002; Details	(Egypt); Cairo	Egypt	–	Algeria	Tunisia	–	Iraq
16	2005; Details	(Saudi Arabia); Riyadh	Algeria	–	Morocco	Jordan	–	Tunisia
17	2007; Details	(Egypt); Cairo	Jordan	80–69	Egypt	Saudi Arabia	and	Tunisia
18	2008; Details	(Tunisia); Tunis	Tunisia	83–77	Jordan	Egypt	83–64	Syria
19	2009; Details	(Morocco); Rabat	Tunisia	70–50	Egypt	Morocco	85–81	Syria
20	2010; Details	(Lebanon); Beyrouth	Egypt	60–57	Lebanon	Morocco	74–64	Algeria
21	2015; Details	(Egypt); Sharm el-Sheikh	Egypt	78–54	Algeria	Iraq	59–58	Saudi Arabia
22	2017; Details	(Egypt); Cairo	Egypt	96–90	Morocco	Bahrain	79–69	Saudi Arabia
23	2018; Details	(Egypt); Cairo	Saudi Arabia	85–81	Algeria	Egypt	84–72	Bahrain
24	2022; Details	(United Arab Emirates); Dubai	Lebanon	72–69	Tunisia	Algeria	93–77	Somalia
25	2023; Details	(Egypt); Cairo	Egypt	67–47	Libya	Tunisia	73–66	United Arab Emirates
26	2025; Details	(Bahrain); Isa Town	Algeria	No playoffs	Tunisia	United Arab Emirates	No playoffs	Bahrain

== Titles by team ==
Team	Titles	Runners-up	Third-place	Fourth-place	Semi-finalists
Egypt	13 (1974, 1978, 1987, 1989, 1991, 1994, 1999, 2000, 2002, 2010, 2015, 2017, 2023)	2 (2007, 2009)	2 (2008, 2018)	1 (1992)	–
Tunisia	4 (1981, 1983, 2008, 2009)	2 (2022, 2025)	4 (1991, 1992, 2002, 2023)	3 (1989, 2000, 2005, 2007)	1 (2007)
Algeria	2 (2005, 2025)	6 (1981, 1994, 2000, 2002, 2015, 2018)	1 (2022)	2 (1974, 2010)	–
Saudi Arabia	2 (1997, 2018)	1 (1978)	–	4 (1083, 1991, 2015, 2017)	1 (2007)
Jordan	1 (2007)	4 (1983, 1992, 1999, 2008)	3 (1987, 1989, 2005)	–	–
Syria	1 (1992)	2 (1991, 1997)	1 (1994)	3 (1999, 2008, 2009)	1 (1999)
Lebanon	1 (2022)	1 (2010)	1 (1974)	1 (1997)	–
Sudan	1 (1975)	–	–	–	–
Iraq	–	4 (1974, 1975, 1987, 1989)	2 (1983, 2015)	1 (2002)	–
Morocco	–	2 (2005, 2017)	3 (2000, 2009, 2010)	–	–
Libya	–	1 (2023)	–	–	–
United Arab Emirates	–	–	2 (1997, 2025)	3 (1991, 1994, 2023)	–
Kuwait	–	–	2 (1975, 1978)	–	–
Bahrain	–	–	1 (2017)	2 (2018, 2025)	–
Mauritania	–	–	1 (1981)	–	–
Somalia	–	–	–	2 (1975, 2022)	–
Qatar	–	–	–	–	1 (1999)

== All-time medal table ==
Rank	Nation	Gold	Silver	Bronze	Total
1	Egypt (EGY)	13	2	2	17
2	Tunisia (TUN)	4	2	5	11
3	Algeria (ALG)	2	6	1	9
4	Saudi Arabia (KSA)	2	1	1	4
5	Jordan (JOR)	1	4	3	8
6	Syria (SYR)	1	2	2	5
7	Lebanon (LIB)	1	1	1	3
8	Sudan (SUD)	1	0	0	1
9	Iraq (IRQ)	0	4	2	6
10	Morocco (MAR)	0	2	3	5
11	Libya (LBY)	0	1	0	1
12	Kuwait (KUW)	0	0	2	2
12	United Arab Emirates (UAE)	0	0	2	2
14	Bahrain (BHR)	0	0	1	1
14	Mauritania (MTN)	0	0	1	1
14	Qatar (QAT)	0	0	1	1
Totals (16 entries)		25	25	27	77

- Share bronze medals at 1999 and 2007.

== Participation details ==
Team	1974 (Iraq)	1975 (Kuwait)	1978 (Egypt)	1981 (Tunisia)	1983 (Jordan)	1987 (Egypt)	1989 (Syria)	1991 (Egypt)	1992 (Syria)	1994 (Egypt)	1997 (Lebanon)	1999 (Jordan)	2000 (Algeria)	2002 (Egypt)	2005 (Saudi Arabia)	2007 (Egypt)	2008 (Tunisia)	2009 (Morocco)	2010 (Lebanon)	2015 (Egypt)	2017 (Egypt)	2018 (Egypt)	2022 (United Arab Emirates)	2023 (Egypt)	2025 (Bahrain)	Total
Algeria	SF; 4th			F 2nd						RR; 2nd			F 2nd	F 2nd	F 1st	×	R2; 5th	QF; 5th	SF; 4th	F 2nd	QF; 6th	F 2nd	SF; 3rd	QF; 5th	RR; 1st	
Bahrain			SF; 4th													×	×	×			SF; 3rd	SF; 4th	×	×	RR; 4th	
Egypt	F 1st		F 1st			F 1st	F 1st	F 1st	SF; 4th	RR; 1st		F 1st	F 1st	F 1st		F 2nd	SF; 3rd	F 2nd	F 1st	F 1st	F 1st	SF; 3rd	×	F 1st	RR; 5th	
Iraq	F 2nd	F 2nd			SF; 3rd	F 2nd	F 2nd							SF; 4th		R1; 9th	R1; 9th	×		SF; 3rd	×	×	×	×		
Jordan					F 2nd	SF; 3rd	SF; 3rd		F 2nd			F 2nd			SF; 3rd	F 1st	F 2nd	×			×	×	QF; 7th	WD		
Kuwait		SF; 3rd	SF; 3rd	SF; 4th						RR; 7th						QF; 6th	×	QF; 8th			×	×	×	QF; 7th	RR; 7th	
Lebanon	SF; 3rd										SF; 4th					×	×	R1; 11th	F 2nd		×	×	F 1st	WD		
Libya																QF; 7th	R1; 7th	QF; 6th			×	×	QF; 5th	F 2nd		
Mauritania				SF; 3rd												×	×	×			×	×	×	QF; 8th		
Morocco													SF; 3rd		F 2nd	×	R1; 8th	SF; 3rd	SF; 3rd		F 2nd	×	WD	R1; 9th		
Palestine																QF; 8th	×	×			×	×	×	×		
Qatar												SF; 3/4				QF; 5th	×	×			×	×	×	×	RR; 6th	
Saudi Arabia			F 2nd		SF; 4th			SF; 4th		RR; 5th	F 1st					SF; 3/4	R2; 6th	QF; 7th		SF; 4th	SF; 4th	F 1st	×	×		
Somalia	SF; 4th															×	×	×			×	×	SF; 4th	QF; 6th		
Sudan		F 1st														R1; 11th	R1; 10th	×			×	×	×	×		
Syria								F 2nd	F 1st	RR; 3rd	F 2nd	SF; 3/4				×	SF; 4th	SF; 4th			×	×	WD	×		
Tunisia				F 1st	F 1st		SF; 4th	SF; 3rd	SF; 3rd	RR; 6th			SF; 4th	SF; 3rd	SF; 4th	SF; 3/4	F 1st	F 1st			×	×	F 2nd	SF; 3rd	RR; 2nd	
United Arab Emirates						SF; 4th				RR; 4th	SF; 3rd					×	×	R1; 9th			QF; 5th	R1; 5th	QF; 6th	SF; 4th	RR; 3rd	
Yemen																R1; 10th	×	R1; 10th			×	×	×	×		
Total										7						11	10	11			6	5	7	9	7	

Legends

- 1st – Champions
- 2nd – Runner-up
- 3rd – Third place
- 4th – Fourth place
- 3/4 – Semi-finals
- QF — Knockout quarterfinals (2009–present)
- R2 — Second round group (1974–2009)
- WD — Withdrew
- RR — Round-robin
- • — Did not qualify
- × — Did not enter / disqualified
- — Hosts

== See also ==
- Basketball at the Arab Games
- Arab U18 Basketball Championship
