= Marijan Novović =

Serbian basketball player and coach

Personal information
- Born: 10 February 1947 Belgrade, PR Serbia, FPR Yugoslavia
- Died: 2 September 2013 (aged 66) Belgrade, Serbia

Career information
- NBA draft: 1969: undrafted
- Playing career: 1964–1974
- Coaching career: 1974–2003

Career history

Playing
- 1964–1973: OKK Beograd
- 1973–1974: Strombeek Beavers

Coaching
- 1974–1975: Racing Club (assistant)
- 1975–1977: Sloboda Tuzla
- 1977–1978: Maribor
- 1980–1985: Gabon
- 1985–1987: Radnički Belgrade
- 1987–1988: Proleter Zrenjanin
- 1988–1989: Kolubara
- 1990–1992: OKK Beograd
- 1992–1993: Facilizing Caserta
- 1993–1994: NP Battipaglia
- 1998–1999: Crvena zvezda (Women's)
- 2001: North Korea U-22
- 2001–2003: Tunisia

Marijan Novović (Serbian Cyrillic: Маријан Нововић; February 10, 1947 – September 5, 2013), also known by his nickname Šilja (transl. Goofy), was a Serbian basketball coach and player.

== Playing career ==
In his playing days, he spent his career with OKK Beograd of the Yugoslav League, before finishing his playing career with Belgian side Strombeek Beavers.

== Coaching career ==
Novović started his coaching career as an assistant coach for Racing Club de France (France). Later, he coached Sloboda Tuzla, Maribor, Radnički Belgrade and OKK Beograd of the Yugoslav First Federal League. He also spent two seasons in Italy where he coached and Pallacanestro Battipaglia from Salerno.

He also coached the senior national teams of Gabon and Tunisia and the U22 national team of North Korea.
