= Atef Maoua =

Tunisian basketball player

Medal record

Men's basketball

Representing Tunisia

African Championships
Bronze medal – third place	2009 Libya	Tunisia

Atef Maoua (born January 28, 1981) is a Tunisian basketball player. He currently plays for J.S. Kairouan in the Tunisian Basketball League. He is a six-foot-six-inch, 218 pound guard-forward.

Maoua is also a long-time member of the Tunisia national basketball team. He made his debut for the national team at the FIBA Africa Championship 2005 and has since played for the team at both the FIBA Africa Championship 2007 and FIBA Africa Championship 2009. He averaged 9.2 points and 2.8 rebounds per game for the Tunisian side at the 2009 FIBA Africa Championship to help the team to the bronze medal and its first ever trip to the FIBA World Championship.
