= Mourad El Mabrouk =

Tunisian basketball player

No. 7 – Club Africain
- Position: Shooting guard
- League: Championnat Pro A

Personal information
- Born: 19 October 1986 (age 40) Tunis, Tunisia
- Listed height: 1.94 m (6 ft 4 in)
- Listed weight: 84 kg (185 lb)

Career information
- Playing career: 2003–present

Career history
- 2003–2012: Ezzahra Sports
- 2012–2016: Club Africain
- 2016–2019: ES Radés
- 2019–2020: Hermine Nantes
- 2020–2021: Ezzahra Sports
- 2021: US Monastir
- 2021–2022: ES Radés
- 2022–2023: Jalaa
- 2023–present: Club Africain

Career highlights
- 3x Tunisian League champion (2014–2016)
Medals
Men's basketball
Representing Tunisia
AfroBasket
Gold medal – first place	2017 Tunisia/Senegal
Gold medal – first place	2021 Rwanda

Mourad El Mabrouk (born 19 October 1986) is a Tunisian professional basketball player for Club Africain of the Championnat Pro A.

== Professional career ==
El Mabrouk has played with Club Africain in the Tunisian League. In May 2021, he joined US Monastir to play in the inaugural season of the Basketball Africa League (BAL). He was a starter for Monastir as the team went on to play in the 2021 BAL Finals, where they lost to Zamalek. El Mabrouk averaged 6 points and 2.5 assists per game.

On May 6, 2022, El Mabrouk signed with Jalaa of the Syrian Basketball League ahead of the Final Four stage.

== Tunisian national team ==
El Mabrouk has played with the senior men's Tunisian national basketball team. He competed at the 2012 Summer Olympics.

== BAL career statistics ==
Legend
GP	Games played	GS	Games started	MPG	Minutes per game
FG%	Field goal percentage	3P%	3-point field goal percentage	FT%	Free throw percentage
RPG	Rebounds per game	APG	Assists per game	SPG	Steals per game
BPG	Blocks per game	PPG	Points per game	**Bold**	Career high

Year	Team	GP	GS	MPG	FG%	3P%	FT%	RPG	APG	SPG	BPG	PPG
2021	Monastir	6	6	23.7	.286	.303	1.000	2.3	2.5	1.0	0.3	6.0
Career		6	6	23.7	.286	.303	1.000	2.3	2.5	1.0	0.3	6.0
