= Mehdi Hafsi =

Tunisian basketball player

Personal information
- Born: February 23, 1978 (age 48) Bordeaux, France
- Listed height: 203 cm (6 ft 8 in)
- Listed weight: 224 lb (102 kg)

Career information
- NBA draft: 2000: undrafted
- Playing career: 1996–2015
- Position: Power forward / center

Career history
- 1996–1997: Pau Orthez
- 1997–1999: Besançon BCD
- 1999–2001: Montpellier Paillade
- 2001–2003: Joventut Badalona
- 2003–2004: Limoges
- 2004–2005: Los Barrios
- 2005: ASVEL Villeurbanne
- 2005–2006: JL Bourg
- 2006–2007: Besançon BCD
- 2007–2010: Hermaine Nantes
- 2010–2012: ESSM Le Portel
- 2012–2013: AS Monaco
- 2013–2015: JSA Bordeaux
Medals
Men's basketball
Representing France
European U-18 Championship
Silver medal – second place	1996 France	U-18 Team

Mehdi Jamel Labeyrie-Hafsi, known as Mehdi Labeyrie or Mehdi Hafsi (born February 23, 1978) is a former French-born Tunisian professional basketball player.

== Professional career ==
During his pro club career, Hafsi played in the French Pro A League, the Spanish ACB League, and the European-wide secondary level EuroCup.

== National team career ==
Hafsi played with the senior Tunisian national team at the 2012 Summer Olympics.
