= 2023 Arab Basketball Championship =

Tournament details
- Host country: Egypt
- City: Cairo
- Dates: 26 December 2023- 3 January 2024
- Teams: 9 (from 2 confederations)
- Venue: 1 (in 1 host city)

Final positions
- Champions: Egypt (13th title)
- Runners-up: Libya
- Third place: Tunisia
- Fourth place: United Arab Emirates

2023 Arab Basketball Championship for Men National Teams was the 25th edition of the Arab Basketball Championship, a men's basketball regional championship of Arab world . The tournament was hosted by Egypt for the 11th time and featured 9 teams.

== Host selection ==
The Arab Confederation of Basketball proceeded to a reorganization of the program of the 25th edition of the Arab Nations Championship, to be held from 26 December 2023 to 3 January 2024 in Cairo, Egypt.

== Draw ==
11 Teams entered the game, on first but Jordan and Lebanon withdrew from the tournament.

Africa

- Algeria
- Libya
- Somalia
- Morocco
- Tunisia
- Mauritania
- Egypt (hosts)

Asia

- Jordan (withdrew)
- Lebanon (withdrew)
- Kuwait
- United Arab Emirates

The 9 team divided into two groups.

Goupe	Team
Groupe 1	Algeria; Somalia; Libya; Mauritania
Groupe 2	Egypt; Tunisia; Morocco; United Arab Emirates; Kuwait
Total	9

== Squads ==
Each team consisted of 12 players.

- Tunisia :Squad
- United Arab Emirates: Squad
- Kuwait : Squad
- Egypt :Squad
- Morocco:Squad
- Algeria:Squad
- Somalia:Squad
- Mauritania: Squad
- Libya:Squad

== Venues ==
Cairo Stadium

== Preliminary round ==
=== Group A ===
Pos	Team	Pld	W	L	GF	GA	GD	Pts	Qualification
1	Libya	3	3	0	260	216	+44	6	Quarter-finals
2	Algeria	3	2	1	217	225	−8	5	Quarter-finals
3	Somalia	3	1	2	234	231	+3	4	Quarter-finals
4	Mauritania	3	0	3	212	251	−39	3	Quarter-finals

Rules for classification: 1) Points; 2) Head-to-head results; 3) Points difference; 4) Points scored.

26 December 2023
15:30

ABCONF

Algeria	80–75	Somalia
Scoring by quarter: 19 -15, 21 -19, 23-22, 17- 19

Cairo Stadium, Cairo

27 December 2023
14:00

ABCONF

Libya	94–77	Mauritania
Scoring by quarter: 21 - 17, 29 -16, 17 -17, 17- 27

Cairo Stadium, Cairo

28 December 2023
16:30

ABCONF

Somalia	87–70	Mauritania
Scoring by quarter: 20-12, 29-11, 16-14, 22 -23

Cairo Stadium, Cairo

29 December 2023
16:30

ABCONF

Libya	85–67	Algeria
Scoring by quarter: 15-13, 20-20, 18-15, 32 - 19

Cairo Stadium, Cairo

30 December 2023
12:00

ABCONF

Somalia	72–81	Libya
Scoring by quarter: 16 -20, 17-17, 19-18, 20 -26

Cairo Stadium, Cairo

30 December 2023
14:30

ABCONF

Algeria	70–65	Mauritania
Scoring by quarter: 26-14, 18-25, 15- 10, 11 - 16

Cairo Stadium, Cairo

=== Group B ===
Pos	Team	Pld	W	L	GF	GA	GD	Pts	Qualification
1	Egypt (H)	4	4	0	347	203	+144	8	Quarter-finals
2	Tunisia	4	3	1	292	301	−9	7	Quarter-finals
3	United Arab Emirates	4	2	2	294	353	−59	6	Quarter-finals
4	Kuwait	4	1	3	297	320	−23	5	Quarter-finals
5	Morocco	4	0	4	261	314	−53	4	

Rules for classification: 1) Points; 2) Head-to-head results; 3) Points difference; 4) Points scored.
(H) Hosts

26 December 2023
13:00

ABCONF

Kuwait	85–69	Tunisia
Scoring by quarter: 21-15, 11-25, 22-37, 15 -25

Cairo Stadium, Cairo

26 December 2023
19:00

ABCONF

Egypt	94–46	United Arab Emirates
Scoring by quarter: 29 -20, 10-11, 24-7, 22 -9

Cairo Stadium, Cairo

27 December 2023
16:30

ABCONF

Tunisia	66–54	Morocco
Scoring by quarter: 16-9, 19- 11, 17-22, 14 - 10

Cairo Stadium, Cairo

27 December 2023
19:00

ARABCONF

Egypt	92–41	Kuwait
Scoring by quarter: 22-6, 30-11, 29-16, 11-8

Cairo Stadium, Cairo

28 December 2023
14:00

ABCONF

Morocco	82–84	United Arab Emirates
Scoring by quarter: 20-18, 21-17, 30-22, 11-27

Cairo Stadium, Cairo

28 December 2023
19:00

ABCONF

Egypt	85–63	Tunisia
Scoring by quarter: 25-15, 25-11, 18-17, 20-17

Cairo Stadium, Cairo

29 December 2023
14:00

ABCONF

Kuwait	88–72	Morocco
Scoring by quarter: 20-22, 22-16, 24-15, 20 -16

Cairo Stadium, Cairo

29 December 2023
19:00

ABCONF

Tunisia	94–77	United Arab Emirates
Scoring by quarter: 18-18, 25-20, 29-16, 23-23

Cairo Stadium, Cairo

30 December 2023
17:00

ABCONF

United Arab Emirates	87–83	Kuwait
Scoring by quarter: 32 -22, 16-26, 15-21, 24-14

Cairo Stadium, Cairo

30 December 2023
19:30

ABCONF

Egypt	76–53	Morocco
Scoring by quarter: 16 -14, 24-10, 21-15, 15-14

Cairo Stadium, Cairo

== Knockout stage ==
=== Bracket ===
Quarter-finals
1 January
Libya	89
Kuwait	72
1 January
Tunisia	95
Somalia	74
1 January
Algeria	73
United Arab Emirates	79
1 January
Egypt	88
Mauritania	56

Semi-finals
2 January
Libya	70
Tunisia	64
2 January
Egypt	114
United Arab Emirates	78

Final
3 January
Libya	47
Egypt	67
Third place
3 January
Tunisia	73
United Arab Emirates	66

=== Quarter-finals ===
1 January 2024
12:00

ABCONF

Algeria	73–79	United Arab Emirates
Scoring by quarter: 12-22, 20-25, 30 -29, 11 -13

Cairo Stadium, Cairo

1 January 2024
14:30

ABCONF

Tunisia	95–74	Somalia
Scoring by quarter: 22-12, 21-13, 31 -25, 21-15

Cairo Stadium, Cairo

1 January 2024
17:00

ABCONF

Libya	89–76	Kuwait
Scoring by quarter: 21 - 18, 18-21, 27-21, 23-16

Cairo Stadium, Cairo

1 January 2024
19:30

ABCONF

Egypt	88–56	Mauritania
Scoring by quarter: 28 -18, 16-10, 21-15, 23-13

Cairo Stadium, Cairo

=== Semi-finals ===
2 January 2024
17:00

ABCONF

Libya	70–64	Tunisia
Scoring by quarter: 12-6, 11-14, 16-25, 21-19

Cairo Stadium, Cairo

2 January 2024
19:30

ABCONF

Egypt	114–78	United Arab Emirates
Scoring by quarter: 22-28, 27-18, 29-15, 36 -17

Cairo Stadium, Cairo

=== Third place ===
3 January 2024
16:00

ABCONF

Tunisia	73–66	United Arab Emirates
Scoring by quarter: 11-17, 17 -15, 30-16, 15 - 16

Cairo Stadium, Cairo

=== Final ===
3 January 2024
18:30

ABCONF

Libya	47–67	Egypt
Scoring by quarter: 25-22, 13-17, 9-28

Cairo Stadium, Cairo

== Final standings ==
Rank	Team	Record
1st place, gold medalist(s)	Egypt	6–0
2nd place, silver medalist(s)	Libya	5–1
3rd place, bronze medalist(s)	Tunisia	5–2
4	United Arab Emirates	3–3
5	Algeria	2–2
6	Somalia	1–3
7	Kuwait	1–4
8	Mauritania	0–3
9	Morocco	0–4

== Broadcasting ==
- Arab basketball federation YOUTUBE :abbconf
- Dubai Sports
