= Mohamed Hdidane =

Tunisian basketball player (born 1986)

No. 9 – Al Riyadi Club Beirut
- Position: Small forward / power forward
- League: Lebanese Basketball League

Personal information
- Born: 27 April 1986 (age 40) Nabeul, Tunisia
- Listed height: 6 ft 9 in (2.06 m)
- Listed weight: 243 lb (110 kg)

Career information
- Playing career: 2003–present

Career history
- 2003–2012: Stade Nabeulien
- 2011: →Étoile Sportive du Sahel
- 2012–2013: Wydad Casablanca
- 2013–2015: Club Africain
- 2015–2016: Wydad Casablanca
- 2016–2019: ES Radès
- 2019–2020: US Monastir
- 2020–2021: Club Africain
- 2021–2022: Ezzahra Sports
- 2022: Al Wahda
- 2022–present: Al Riyadi Club Beirut
Medals
Men's basketball
Representing Tunisia
AfroBasket
Gold medal – first place	2017 Tunisia/Senegal
Bronze medal – third place	2009 Libya

Mohamed Hdidane (born 27 April 1986) is a Tunisian basketball player for Al Riyadi Club Beirut of the Lebanese Basketball League.

== Professional career ==
Hdidane has played pro club basketball with Stade Nabeulien in the Tunisian Basketball League. Hdidane has played for the team since he was signed as a teenager.

== Tunisian national team ==
Hdidane was a member of the senior men's Tunisian national basketball team that finished third at the 2009 FIBA Africa Championship, to qualify for the country's first FIBA World Championship. Hdidane averaged 8.8 points and 3.9 rebounds per game for the Tunisians during the tournament. He played for Tunisia at the 2012 Summer Olympics. He has also competed for the Tunisians in the 2007 FIBA Africa Championship and the 2004 FIBA Africa Under-20 Championship.

On 11 September 2023 he returned to Club Africain for the second time.
