= Naim Dhifallah =

Tunisian basketball player

Club Africain
- Position: Forward
- League: Championnat Pro A

Personal information
- Born: April 12, 1982 (age 44) Nabeul, Tunisia
- Listed height: 6 ft 5 in (1.96 m)

Career information
- Playing career: 2002–present

Career history
- 2002-08: Club Africain
- 2008-2009: Egypt Assurance
- 2009–present: Club Africain

Career highlights
- Championnat Pro A MVP (2023)
Medals
Men's basketball
Representing Tunisia
African Championships
Bronze medal – third place	2009 Libya	Tunisia

Naim Dhifallah (born April 12, 1982) is a Tunisian basketball player currently playing for Club Africain after playing for Egypt Assurance in the Egyptian Basketball League and Club Africain for the first six years of his career.

Dhifallah is a member of the Tunisia national basketball team that finished third at the 2009 FIBA Africa Championship to qualify for the country's first FIBA World Championship. Dhifallah averaged eight points per game for the Tunisians during the tournament including a team-leading 13 points in an opening loss to Cape Verde. He has also competed for the Tunisians in the 2005 and 2007 FIBA Africa Championship.
