= Nizar Knioua =

Tunisian basketball player

No. 39 – ES Radès
- Position: Guard
- League: TBL

Personal information
- Born: June 8, 1983 (age 43) Nabeul, Tunisia
- Listed height: 6 ft 2 in (1.88 m)
- Listed weight: 182 lb (83 kg)

Career information
- Playing career: 2002–present

Career history
- 2002–2013: Stade Nabeulien
- 2013–2016: Club Africain
- 2016–2018: Étoile Sportive du Sahel
- 2017: →US Monastir
- 2018–2019: Stade Nabeulien
- 2018: →ES Radès
- 2019–2021: Club Africain
- 2021: Ezzahra Sports
- 2021–2022: Stade Nabeulien
- 2022–present: ES Radès
Medals
Men's basketball
Representing Tunisia
AfroBasket
Gold medal – first place	2017 Tunisia/Senegal
Bronze medal – third place	2009 Libya

Nizar Knioua (born June 8, 1983) is a Tunisian professional basketball player.

== Pro career ==
Knioua has played pro club basketball with Stade Nabeulien and Club Africain in the Tunisian Basketball League.

== Tunisian national team ==
Knioua was a member of the senior men's Tunisian national basketball team that finished third at the 2009 FIBA Africa Championship, to qualify for the country's first FIBA World Championship. Providing depth off the bench, Knioua scored 16 points and grabbed 15 rebounds, while playing in eight games for the Tunisians during the tournament. He has also competed for the Tunisians in the 2007 FIBA Africa Championship.
