= Mokhtar Ghyaza =

Tunisian basketball player

No. 28 – US Monastir
- Position: Center
- League: Championnat National A Basketball Africa League

Personal information
- Born: 15 November 1986 (age 40) Sfax, Tunisia
- Listed height: 6 ft 9 in (2.06 m)
- Listed weight: 233 lb (106 kg)

Career information
- Playing career: 2006–present

Career history
- 2006–2013: ES Radès
- 2013–2014: Al-Khor SC
- 2014: →Club Africain
- 2014–2015: AS FAR
- 2015–2017: Club Africain
- 2017–2019: ES Radès
- 2019–present: US Monastir
- 2021: →Ezzahra Sports

Career highlights
- BAL champion (2022); 6× Tunisian League champion (2014–2016, 2020–2022); 5× Tunisian Cup champion (2014, 2015, 2020–2022)
Medals
Men's basketball
Representing Tunisia
AfroBasket
Gold medal – first place	2017 Tunisia/Senegal
Gold medal – first place	2021 Rwanda
Bronze medal – third place	2009 Libya

Mokhtar Ghyaza (born 15 November 1986) is a Tunisian basketball player who currently plays for US Monastir of the Championnat National A and the Basketball Africa League (BAL).

== Professional career ==
Ghyaza has played pro club basketball with ES Radès and Club Africain in the Tunisian Basketball League.

In the offseason of 2019, Ghyaza signed with US Monastir. After winning the 2020 championship, he made his debut in the Basketball Africa League (BAL) with the team. Monastir reached the finals. On 10 September 2021, he re-signed for another season. On 28 May 2022, he won the club's first-ever BAL championship with Monastir.

== Tunisian national basketball team ==
Ghyaza was a member of the senior men's Tunisia national basketball team that finished third at the 2009 FIBA Africa Championship, to qualify for the country's first FIBA World Championship. Ghyaza averaged 5.7 points and 1.3 rebounds per game, off the bench, for the Tunisians during the tournament. He pulled down a team-leading five rebounds for the Tunisians in a bronze medal victory over Cameroon, that sent the team to the 2010 FIBA World Championship.

== BAL career statistics ==
Legend
GP	Games played	GS	Games started	MPG	Minutes per game
FG%	Field goal percentage	3P%	3-point field goal percentage	FT%	Free throw percentage
RPG	Rebounds per game	APG	Assists per game	SPG	Steals per game
BPG	Blocks per game	PPG	Points per game	**Bold**	Career high

Year	Team	GP	GS	MPG	FG%	3P%	FT%	RPG	APG	SPG	BPG	PPG
2021	Monastir	6	0	14.0	.444	–	**.818**	2.8	.7	**2.0**	**.7**	4.2
2022†	Monastir	**8**	0	**16.8**	**.667**	–	.714	**4.6**	**.9**	1.1	.6	**6.3**
