= Youssef Gaddour =

Tunisian basketball player

Youssef Gaddour (born 15 March 1990, Monastir) is a Tunisian professional basketball player. He plays for Tunisia national basketball team. He competed at the 2012 Summer Olympics. He is 2.03 m (6 ft 8 in) tall.
