= Marouan Kechrid =

Tunisian-French basketball player and coach (born 1981)

Personal information
- Born: 2 June 1981 (age 45) Dreux, France
- Listed height: 5 ft 10 in (1.78 m)
- Listed weight: 170 lb (77 kg)

Career information
- Playing career: 2002–2019
- Position: Guard
- Coaching career: 2021–present

Career history

Playing
- 2001–2005: JS Kairouan
- 2005–2006: Ittihad Tanger
- 2006–2008: JS Kairouan
- 2008–2010: Ittihad Tanger
- 2010–2011: ES Sahel
- 2011–2012: Maghreb de Fes
- 2012–2013: Club Africain
- 2013–2014: US Monastir
- 2014–2018: ES Radès
- 2018–2019: JS Kairouan

Coaching
- 2021–2022: US Monastir (assistant)
- 2022: US Monastir

Career highlights
- As player: FIBA Africa Champions Cup champion (2011); Division Excellence champion (2009); 2× Moroccan Cup winner (2006, 2009); 5× CNA champion (2001–2003, 2017, 2018); 4× Tunisian Cup winner (2002, 2005, 2017, 2018); Maghreb Championship champion (2003); As assistant coach: BAL champion (2022)
Medals
Men's basketball
Representing Tunisia
African Championships
Bronze medal – third place	2009 Libya	Tunisia
Gold medal – first place	2011 Madagascar	Tunisia

Marouan Kechrid (born 2 June 1981) is a Tunisian-French former basketball player and current coach. After starting his career with JS Kairouan, Kechrid played the majority of his career in Tunisia and won five CNA championships over an eighteen-year span. He also played for Ittihad Tanger and Maghreb de Fes in the Moroccan Division Excellence.

Kechrid was a member of the Tunisia national basketball team that finished third at the 2009 FIBA Africa Championship to qualify for the country's first FIBA World Championship. Kechrid averaged 9.8 PPG and 1.9 RPG for the Tunisians during the tournament. He also competed for the Tunisians in the 2005 and 2007 FIBA Africa Championship. He was a member of the Tunisian team that took part in the 2012 Summer Olympics.

Kechrid started his coaching career in 2021 as an assistant with US Monastir, and was promoted to head coach after a year. In October 2022, Kechrid and Monastir agreed to terminate their contract.
