= Ezzahra Sports =

- Nickname: EZS
- League: Championnat National A
- Founded: 1936
- History: Saint-Germain Sports; 1936–1952; Ezzahra Sports; 1952–present
- Arena: Ezzahra Arena
- Capacity: 2,000
- Location: Ezzahra, Tunisia,
- President: Faycel Lahjiri
- Head coach: Akram Sediri
- Championships: 6× Tunisian Leagues; 5× Tunisian Cups
Home	Away

Ezzahra Sports (Arabic: الزهراء الرياضية), or EZS, is a Tunisian professional basketball club from Ezzahra. The club competes in the Championnat National A, the domestic first tier. Home games are played in the Ezzahra Arena.

== History ==
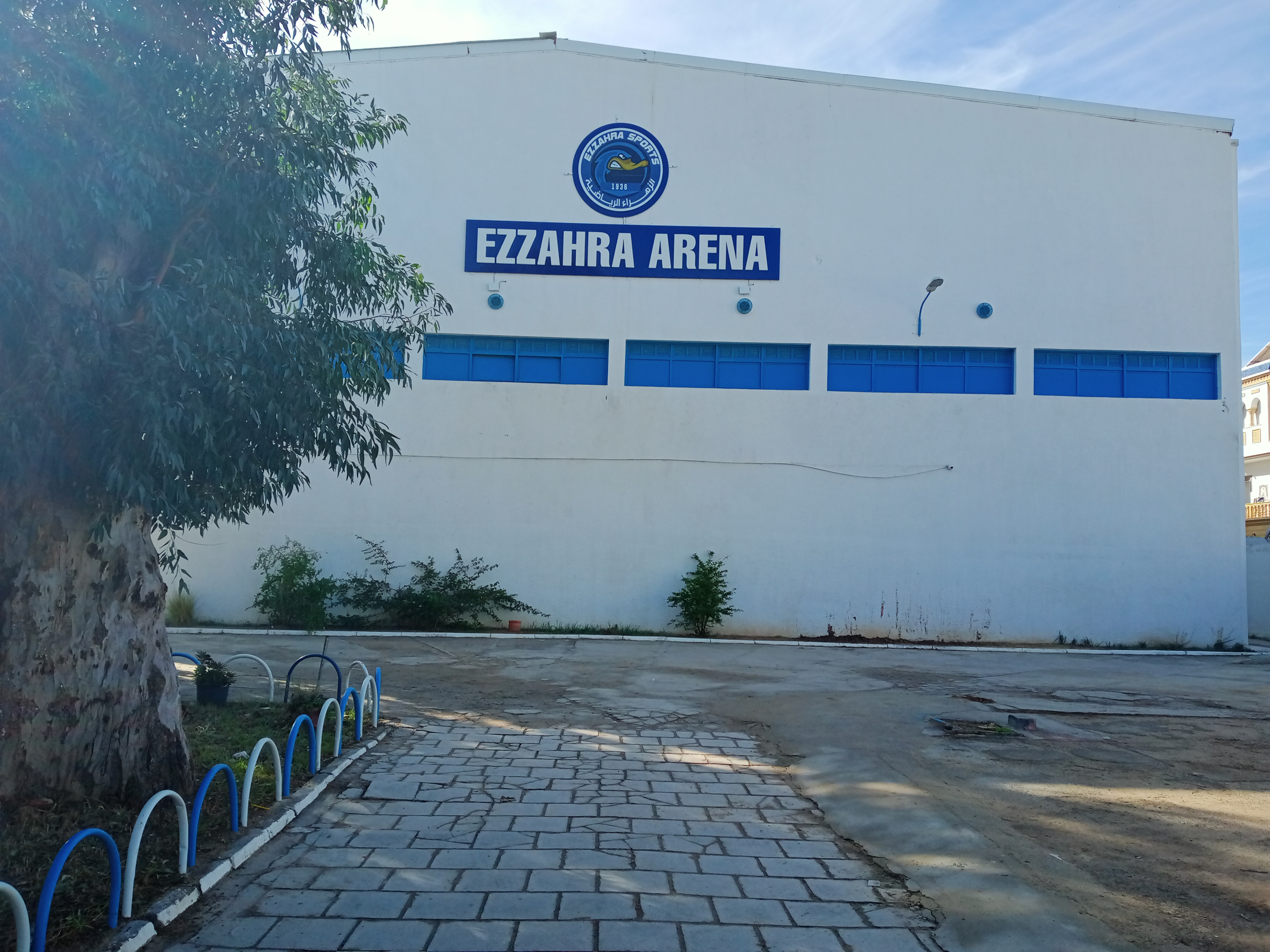
The Ezzahra Arena

Ezzahra has won the Tunisian League championship 6 times, in the years 1982, 1983, 1993, 1994, 1997, and 1999. They have also won the Tunisian Cup 5 times, in the years 1985, 1988, 1991, 1995, and 1998.

== Honours ==
=== Domestic competitions ===
Tunisian Basketball League

- Champions (6): 1981–82, 1982–83, 1992–93, 1993–94, 1996–97, 1998–99
- Runners-up (2): 2020–21, 2021–22

Tunisian Cup

- Champions (5): 1984–85, 1987–88, 1990–91, 1994–95, 1997–98

Tunisian Federation Cup

- Champions (1): 2020

Tunisian Division II Cup

- Champions (1): 2020

=== International competitions ===
Arab Championship

- Third place (3): 1993, 1997, 2021

== Players ==
=== Current roster ===
The following is the current Ezzahra Sports roster:

Note: Flags indicate national team eligibility at FIBA-sanctioned events. Players may hold other non-FIBA nationalities not displayed.

Ezzahra Sports roster
Players
Coaches

Pos.	No.	Nat.	Name	Ht.	Wt.	Age
PG	1	(United States)	Lemon Jr., Walt	1.91 m (6 ft 3 in)	82 kg (181 lb)	33 – 26 July 1992
C	3	(Sudan) (Lebanon)	Majok, Ater	2.08 m (6 ft 10 in)	106 kg (234 lb)	38 – 4 July 1987
PG	4	(Tunisia)	Dhif, Ahmed	1.82 m (6 ft 0 in)		29 – 17 September 1996
F	5	(Tunisia)	Chennoufi, Ziyed	2.01 m (6 ft 7 in)		37 – 29 November 1988
PG	7	(Tunisia)	Jawadi, Jawhar	1.89 m (6 ft 2 in)		28 – 14 July 1997
F	9	(Tunisia)	Hadidane, Mohamed	2.07 m (6 ft 9 in)	107 kg (236 lb)	39 – 27 April 1986
PF	10	(Tunisia)	Addami, Ahmed	2.03 m (6 ft 8 in)		28 – 14 July 1997
C	11	(Tunisia)	Ghyaza, Mokhtar	2.06 m (6 ft 9 in)	106 kg (234 lb)	39 – 15 November 1986
C	12	(Bahrain)	Giles, C. J.	2.11 m (6 ft 11 in)	109 kg (240 lb)	40 – 23 September 1985
PF	13	(Tunisia)	Saada, Haythem	2.05 m (6 ft 9 in)		31 – 3 February 1995

Head coach

- (United States) Paul Coughter

Legend

- (C) Team captain
- Injured

- Roster
Updated: November 10, 2021
