= Amine Rzig =

Tunisian basketball player

ES Radès
- Title: Head coach
- League: Championnat National A

Personal information
- Born: 25 August 1980 (age 46) Nabeul, Tunisia
- Listed height: 198 cm (6 ft 6 in)
- Listed weight: 95 kg (209 lb)

Career information
- Playing career: 1998–2019
- Position: Small forward
- Coaching career: 2019–present

Career history

Playing
- 1998–2008: Stade Nabeulien
- 2008–2010: Tala'ea El Gaish
- 2010: Al Ittihad Alexandria
- 2010–2011: ES Sahel
- 2011–2013: Al Ahly Cairo
- 2013–2014: ES Sahel
- 2014–2015: Al Ittihad Alexandria
- 2015–2018: ES Radès
- 2018–2019: Stade Nabeulien

Coaching
- 2019: Tunisia U23
- 2019–present: ES Radès
- 2025–present: Al Ahli Tripoli (assistant)

Career highlights
- As head coach: Championnat National A Best Coach (2020); As assistant coach: BAL champion (2025)
Medals
Representing Tunisia
African Championships
Bronze medal – third place	2009 Libya	Tunisia
Gold medal – first place	2011 Madagascar	Tunisia

Amine Rzig (born 25 August 1980) is a Tunisian retired basketball player and current coach.

Rzig is a member of the Tunisia national basketball team that finished third at the 2009 FIBA Africa Championship to qualify for the country's first FIBA World Championship. Rzig averaged 16.4 PPG and 5.4 RPG for the Tunisians en route to being named to the All-Tournament team. Highlights for Rzig included scoring a team-leading 20 points in the bronze medal game against Cameroon to lead the Tunisians to the 2010 FIBA World Championship.

In May 2025, Rzig was an assistant coach with Libya's Al Ahli Tripoli in the Basketball Africa League (BAL). He helped them win their first BAL championship on 14 June 2025.
