= ES Radès (basketball) =

- Nickname: ESR
- Leagues: Championnat Pro A
- Founded: 1948; 78 years ago
- History: ES Radès; 1948-present
- Arena: Salle Couverte Taoufik-Bouhima Salle Hedi Annabi
- Capacity: 3,500
- Location: Radès, Tunisia
- Team colors: Blue and White
- President: Adel Ben Romdhane
- Head coach: Amine Rzig
- Championships: 13× Tunisian League; 12× Tunisian Cup
- Website: esrades.tn
Home	Away

Étoile Sportive de Radès (Arabic: النجم الرياضي الرادسي), commonly known as ES Radès, is a Tunisian professional basketball club from Radès, Tunis. The club competes in the Championnat National A, the country's premier league. The Salle Couverte Taoufik-Bouhima is their home.

Several of its players have played for Tunisia's national basketball team.

== Honours ==
=== Domestic competitions ===
Tunisian League

- Champions (13): 1963–64, 1964–65, 1965–66, 1966–67, 1967–68, 1968–69, 1969–70, 1970–71, 1971–72, 1975–76, 1983–84, 2016–17, 2017–18

Tunisian Cup

- Champions (12): 1960–61, 1961–62, 1962–63, 1963–64, 1964–65:, 1967–68, 1969–70, 1970–71, 1971–72, 2016–17, 2017–18, 2018–19

=== International competitions ===
FIBA Africa Clubs Champions Cup

- Runners-up (2): 2014, 2017

== Current roster ==
Note: Flags indicate national team eligibility at FIBA-sanctioned events. Players may hold other non-FIBA nationalities not displayed.

ES Radès roster
Players
Coaches

Pos.	No.	Nat.	Name	Ht.	Age
C		(United States)	Singleton, Rashaad	2.13 m (7 ft 0 in)	38 – 22 May 1987
PG	4	(Tunisia)	Dhif, Ahmed	1.83 m (6 ft 0 in)	29 – 17 September 1996
G	6	(Tunisia)	Ilehi, Hosni	1.85 m (6 ft 1 in)	32 – 24 December 1993
SG	8	(Tunisia)	Mouhli, Omar	1.91 m (6 ft 3 in)	39 – 19 March 1986
G	11	(United States)	Jaxen, Baden	1.91 m (6 ft 3 in)	35 – 1 October 1990
F	14	(Tunisia)	Gaddour, Youssef	2.03 m (6 ft 8 in)	35 – 15 March 1990
F	15	(Tunisia)	Ben Taher, Mohamed	1.98 m (6 ft 6 in)	25 – 16 October 2000
PF	22	(Tunisia)	Trimech, Ahmed	2.01 m (6 ft 7 in)	38 – 1 June 1987
F	32	(Tunisia)	Karoui, Hamdi	2.01 m (6 ft 7 in)	32 – 20 August 1993
G	39	(Tunisia)	Knioua, Nizar	1.88 m (6 ft 2 in)	42 – 8 June 1983
F/C	86	(Tunisia)	Braa, Hamdi	2.03 m (6 ft 8 in)	39 – 7 September 1986

Head coach

(Tunisia) Adel Tlatli

Legend

- (C) Team captain
- Injured

- Roster
Updated: November 16, 2021

== Coaches ==
Nat.	Name	Years
(Cyprus)	Linos Gavriel	2013-2015
(Tunisia)	Safouen Ferjani	2015
(Tunisia)	Amine Rzig	2019–2020

== Notable players ==
Note: Flags indicate national team eligibility at FIBA-sanctioned events. Players may hold other non-FIBA nationalities not displayed.

Criteria

To appear in this section a player must have either:

- Set a club record or won an individual award while at the club
- Played at least one official international match for their national team at any time
- Played at least one official NBA match at any time.

- (Tunisia) Baccar Snoussi
- (Tunisia) Aref Snoussi
- (Tunisia) Khaled Snoussi
- (Tunisia) Fathi Snoussi
- (Tunisia) Fathi Bachtobji
- (Tunisia) Taoufik Bouhima
- (Tunisia) Kais Mrad
- (Tunisia) Hamdi Braa
- (Tunisia) Omar Abada
- (Tunisia) Hamdi Braa
- (United States) Smush Parker

== See also ==
- ES Radès (football)
