= Aphrodisium =

Aphrodisium or Aphrodision (Ancient Greek: Ἀφροδίσιον) may refer to:

- anything of or related to Aphrodite, a Greek goddess
- Aphrodisium, a sanctuary of Aphrodite in the modern Port-Vendres, Spain
- Aphrodisium, the ancient port of Hippo Regius in Africa, now the Algerian city of Annaba
- Aphrodisium, an ancient port, now the Tunisian city of Mahdia
- Aphrodisium, an ancient city in Asia Minor, site of a battle won by Attalus I
- Aphrodisium (Arcadia), a town in ancient Arcadia, Greece
- Aphrodisium (Cyprus), a town in ancient Cyprus
- Aphrodisium, a sacred grove near Psophis in Greece
- Aphrodisium (beetle), genus of beetles

== See also ==
- Aphrodisius
