= Aristeas (disambiguation) =

Aristeas (Ἀριστέας) was a 7th-century BC Greek poet.

Aristeas may also refer to:

== People ==
- Aristeas of Stratonice, ancient Olympic pankration champion
- Aristeas of Argos, a rival of Antigonus II Gonatas
- Aristeas (sculptor), an artist known to us from two sculptures of centaurs
- Aristeas the Exegete, a writer whose work on Job is quoted by Eusebius

== Literature ==
- Letter of Aristeas, a Jewish pseudepigraphal work purporting to be from a Greek official

== Other uses ==
- Aristeas of Marmora, a fictional character in The Dreaming (comics)

== See also ==
- Aristea, genus of plants
- Aristeus (ancient Greece) (also Ἀριστέας), the name of a number of people from classical antiquity
- Letter of Aristeas to Philocrates, a Hellenistic work of the 3rd or early 2nd century BC
