= Papias =

Papias may refer to:

- Papias (admiral), Roman admiral in the 1st century BCE
- Papias, part of an ancient Greek sculptor duo with Aristeas (sculptor)
- Papias of Hierapolis, Greek Apostolic Father, Bishop of Hierapolis and author (c.60-c.130 AD)
- Papias (lexicographer), author of Elementarium Doctrinae Erudimentum (1040s)
- Papias (butterfly), a genus of skipper butterflies
- Papias (Byzantine office), office for eunuchs in the imperial palace administration

== See also ==
- Papaya
