= Fortifications of al-Andalus =

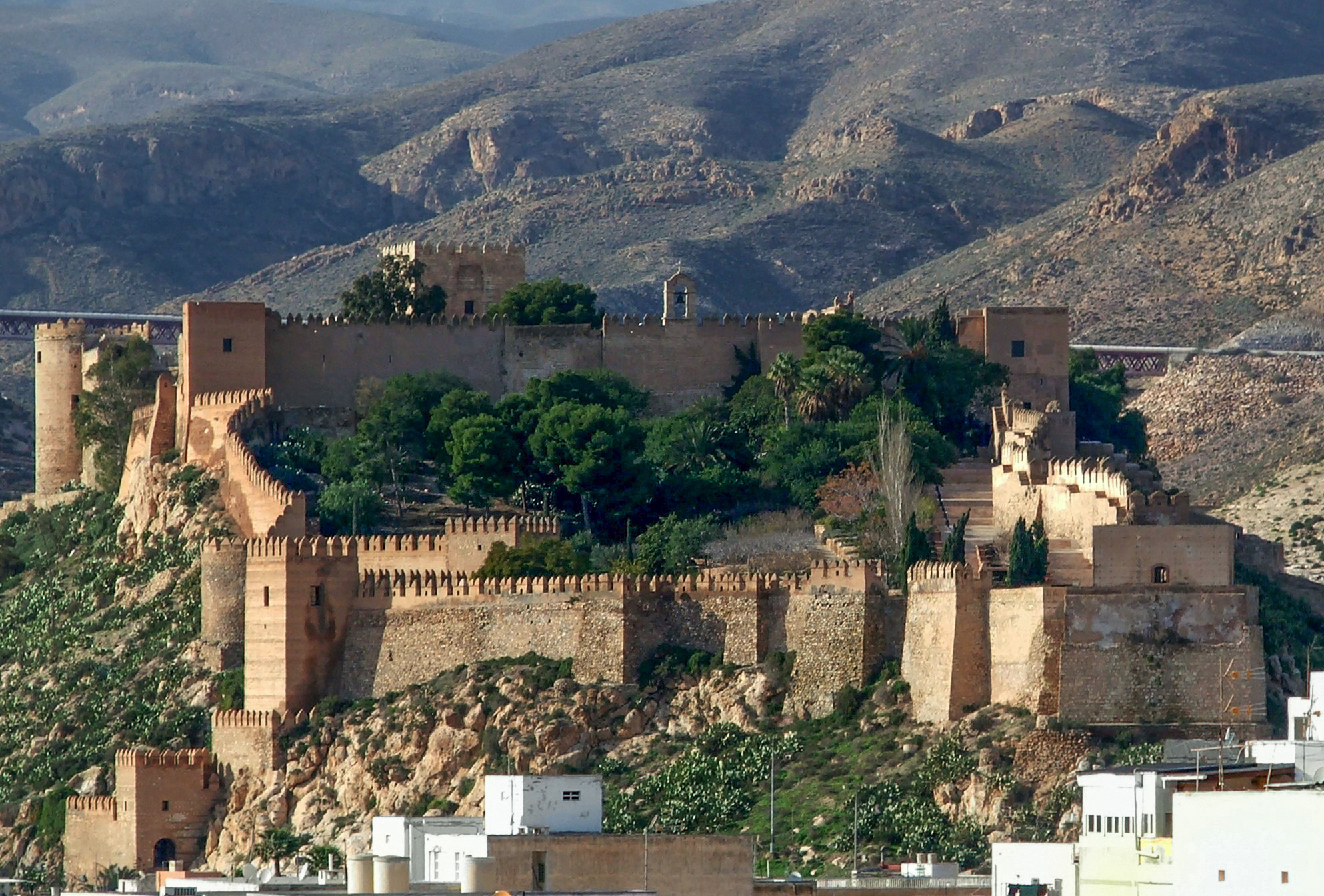
The Alcazaba of Almería, Spain (largely built during the Taifa period of the 11th century)

This article reviews the history of military architecture in al-Andalus, present-day Spain and Portugal under Islamic rule (8th to 15th centuries).

== General ==
The remains of castles and fortifications from various periods of al-Andalus have survived across Spain and Portugal, often situated on hilltops and elevated positions that command the surrounding countryside. A large number of Arabic terms were used to denote the different types and functions of these structures, many of which were borrowed into Spanish and are found in numerous toponyms. Some of the most important Spanish terms today include Alcazaba (from Arabic: القَـصَـبَـة, romanized: al-qaṣabah), meaning a fortified enclosure or citadel where the governor or ruler was typically installed, and Alcázar (from Arabic: القصر, romanized: al-qaṣr), which was typically a palace protected by fortifications. Fortifications were built either in stone or in rammed earth. Stone was used more commonly in the Umayyad period while rammed earth became more common in subsequent periods and was also more common in the south.

== Umayyad period (8th to 10th centuries) ==
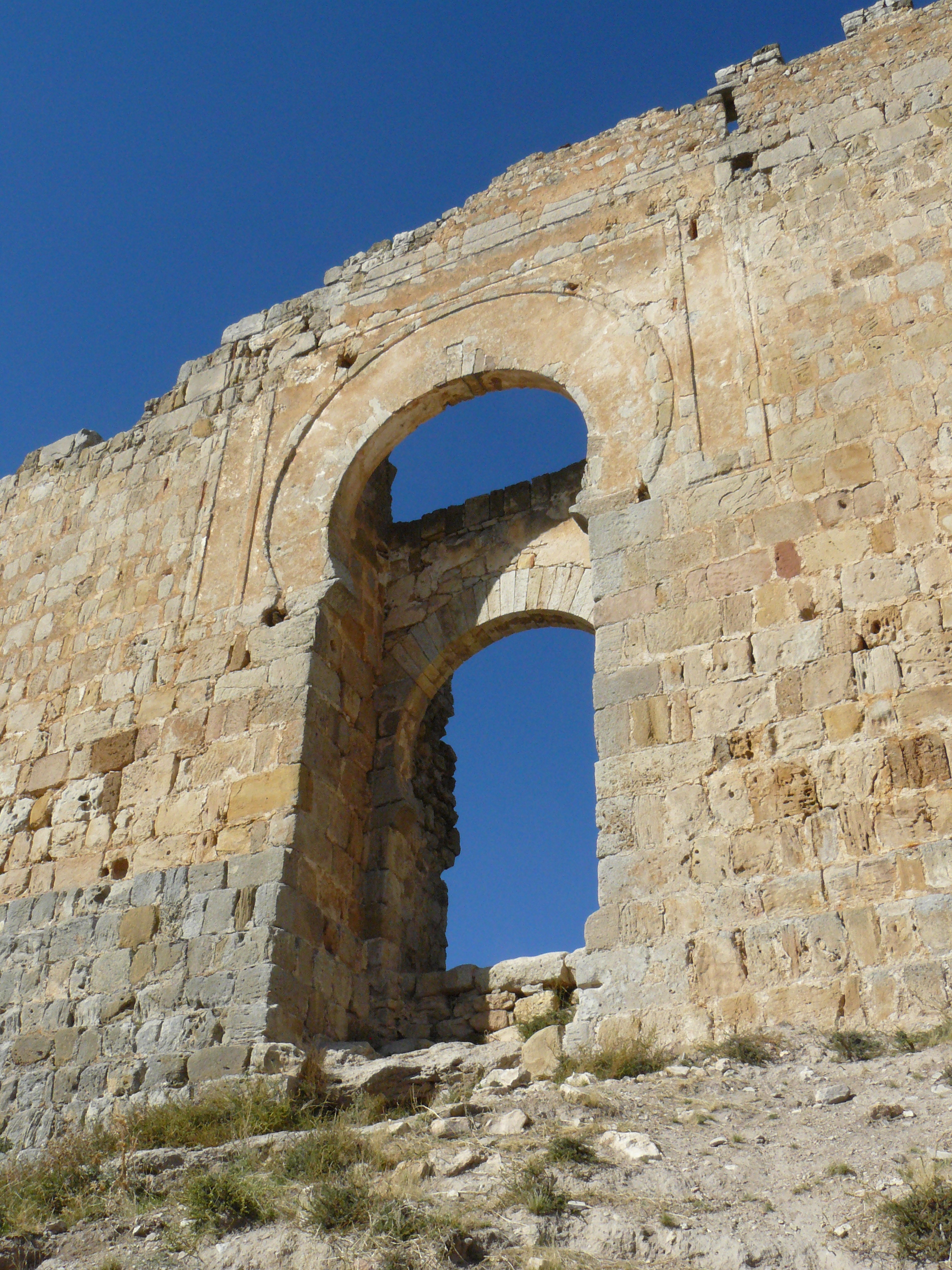
The gate of the ruined Castle of Gormaz, Spain (10th century)

In the Umayyad period (8th–10th centuries) an extensive network of fortifications stretched in a wide line roughly from Lisbon in the west then up through the Central System of mountains in Spain, around the region of Madrid, and finally up to the areas of Navarre and Huesca, north of Zaragoza, in the east. In addition to these border defenses, castles and fortified garrisons existed in the interior regions of the realm as well. Such fortifications were built from the very beginning of Muslim occupation in the 8th century, but a larger number of remaining examples date from the Caliphal period of the 10th century. Some notable examples from this period include the Castle of Gormaz, the Castle of Tarifa, the Alcazaba of Trujillo, the Alcazaba of Guadix, the Burgalimar Castle at Baños de la Encina, and the Alcazaba of Mérida. The castle of El Vacar near Córdoba is an early example of a rammed-earth fortification in Al-Andalus, likely dating from the Emirate period (756–912), while the castle at Baños de la Encina, dating from later in the 10th century, is a more imposing example of rammed earth construction.

Many of these early fortifications had relatively simple architecture with no barbicans and only a single line of walls. The gates were typically straight entrances with an inner and outer doorway (often in the form of horseshoe arches) on the same axis. The castles typically had quadrangular layouts with walls reinforced by rectangular towers. To guarantee a protected access to water even in times of siege, some castles had a tower built on a riverbank which was connected to the main castle via a wall, known in Spanish as a coracha. One of the oldest examples of this can be found at Calatrava la Vieja (9th century), while a much later example is the tower of the Puente del Cadi below the Alhambra in Granada. The Alcazaba of Mérida also features an aljibe (cistern) inside the castle which draws water directly from the nearby river. Moats were also used as defensive measures up until the Almohad period.

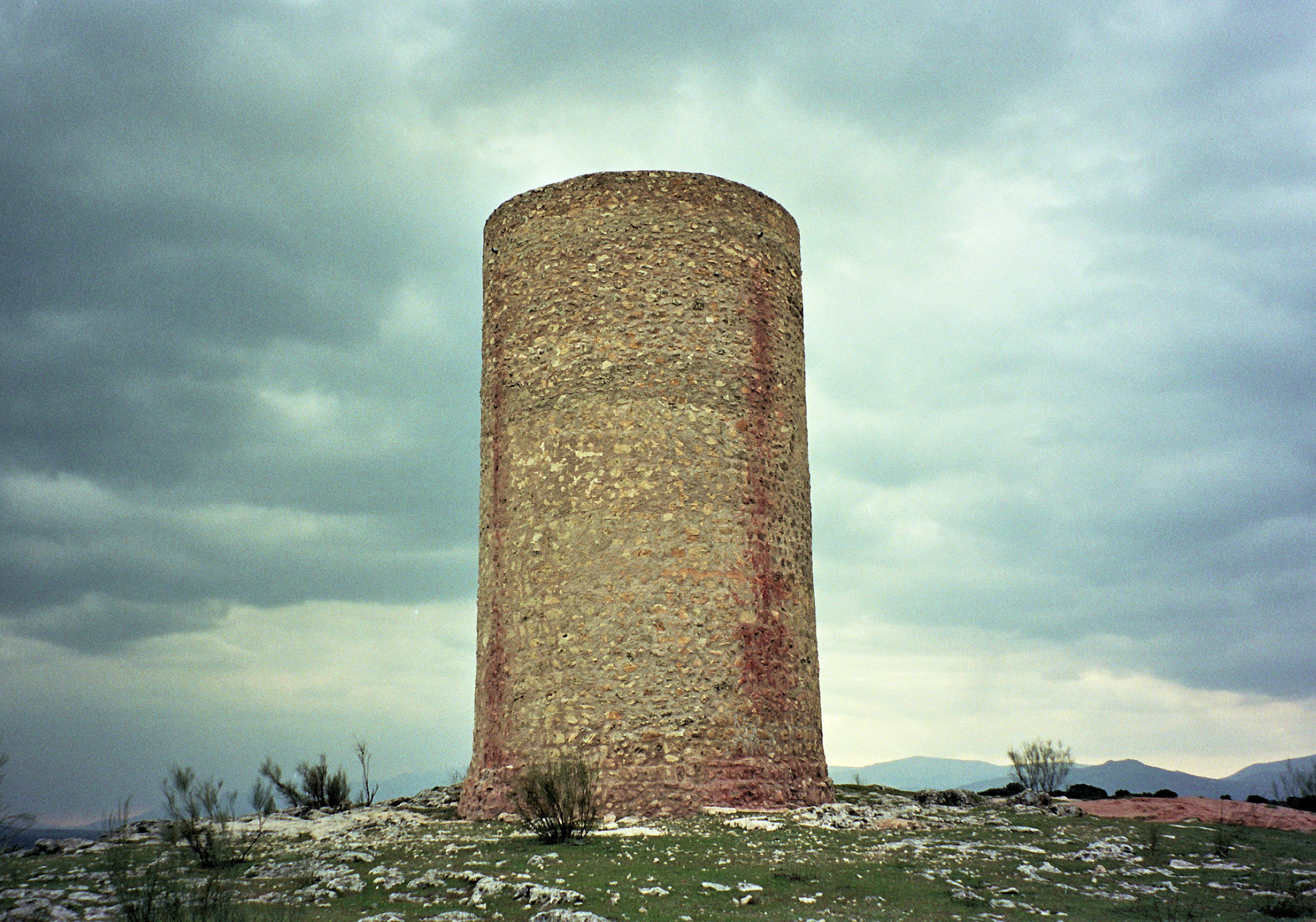
The Watchtower of El Vellón, in the Madrid region, Spain (9th–10th century)

In addition to the more sizeable castles, there was a proliferation of smaller castles and forts which held local garrisons, especially from the 10th century onward. The authorities also built multitudes of small, usually round, watch towers which could rapidly send messages to each other via fire or smoke signals. Using this system of signals, a coded message from Soria in northern Spain, for example, could arrive in Córdoba after as little as five hours. The watchtower of El Vellón, near Madrid, is one surviving example, along with others in the region. This system continued to be used even up until the time of Philip II in the 16th century.

== Taifas, Almoravid, and Almohad periods (11th to 13th centuries) ==
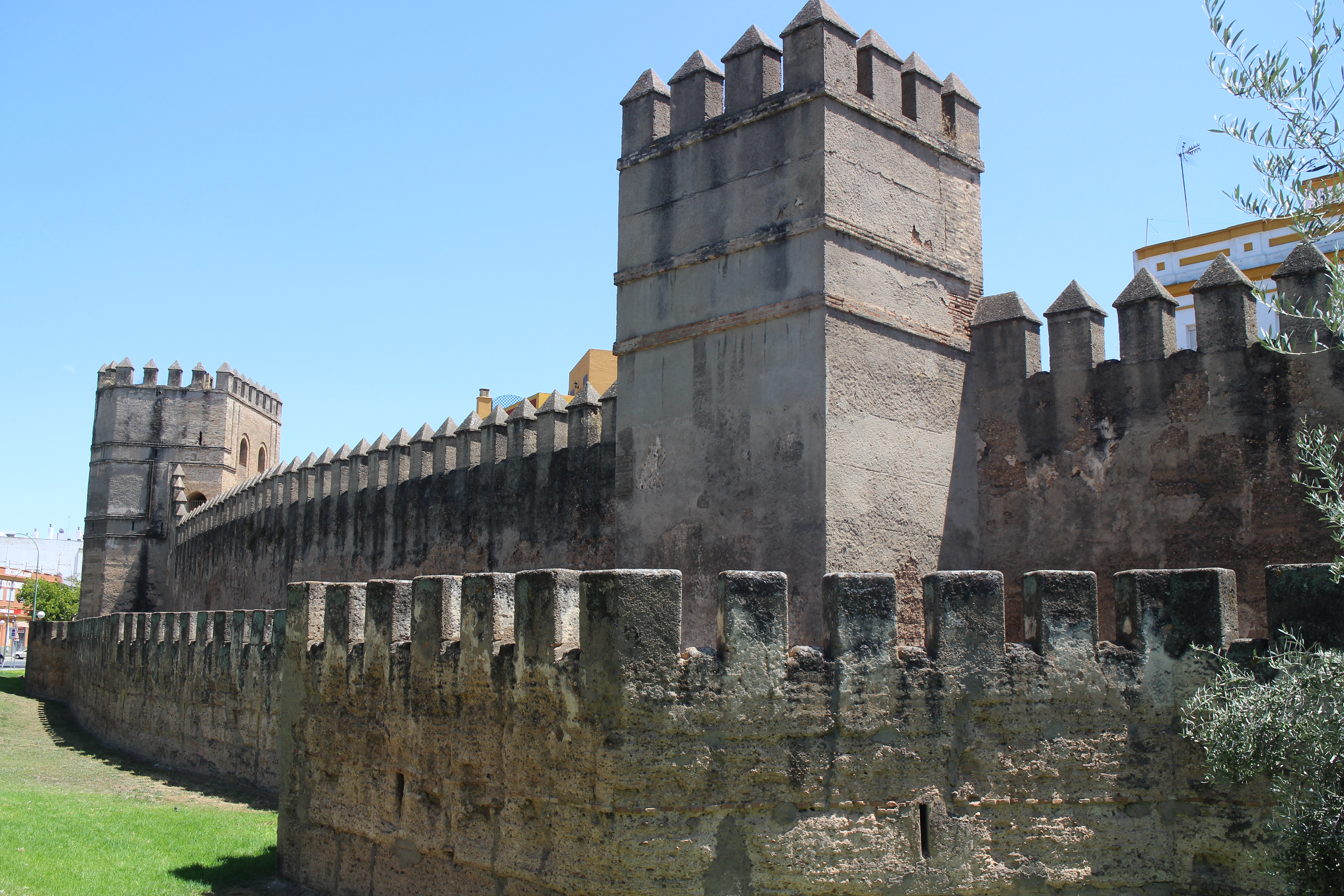
The Almoravid/Almohad-era double walls of Seville, Spain (12th–13th centuries)

Following the collapse of the Caliphate in the 11th century, the resulting political insecurity encouraged further fortification of cities. The Zirid walls of Granada along the northern edge of the Albaicin today (formerly the Old Alcazaba of the city) date from this time, as do the walls of Niebla, the walls of Jativa, and the walls of Almeria and its Alcazaba. The Alcazaba of Málaga also dates from this period but was later redeveloped under the Nasrids. Traces of an 11th-century fortress also exist on the site of Granada's current Alcazaba in the Alhambra. Military architecture also became steadily more complex. Fortified gates began to regularly include bent entrances – meaning that their passage made one or more right-angle turns to slow down any attackers. Precedents for this type of gate existed as far back as the mid-9th century, with a notable example from this time being the Bab al-Qantara (or Puerta del Alcántara today) in Toledo.

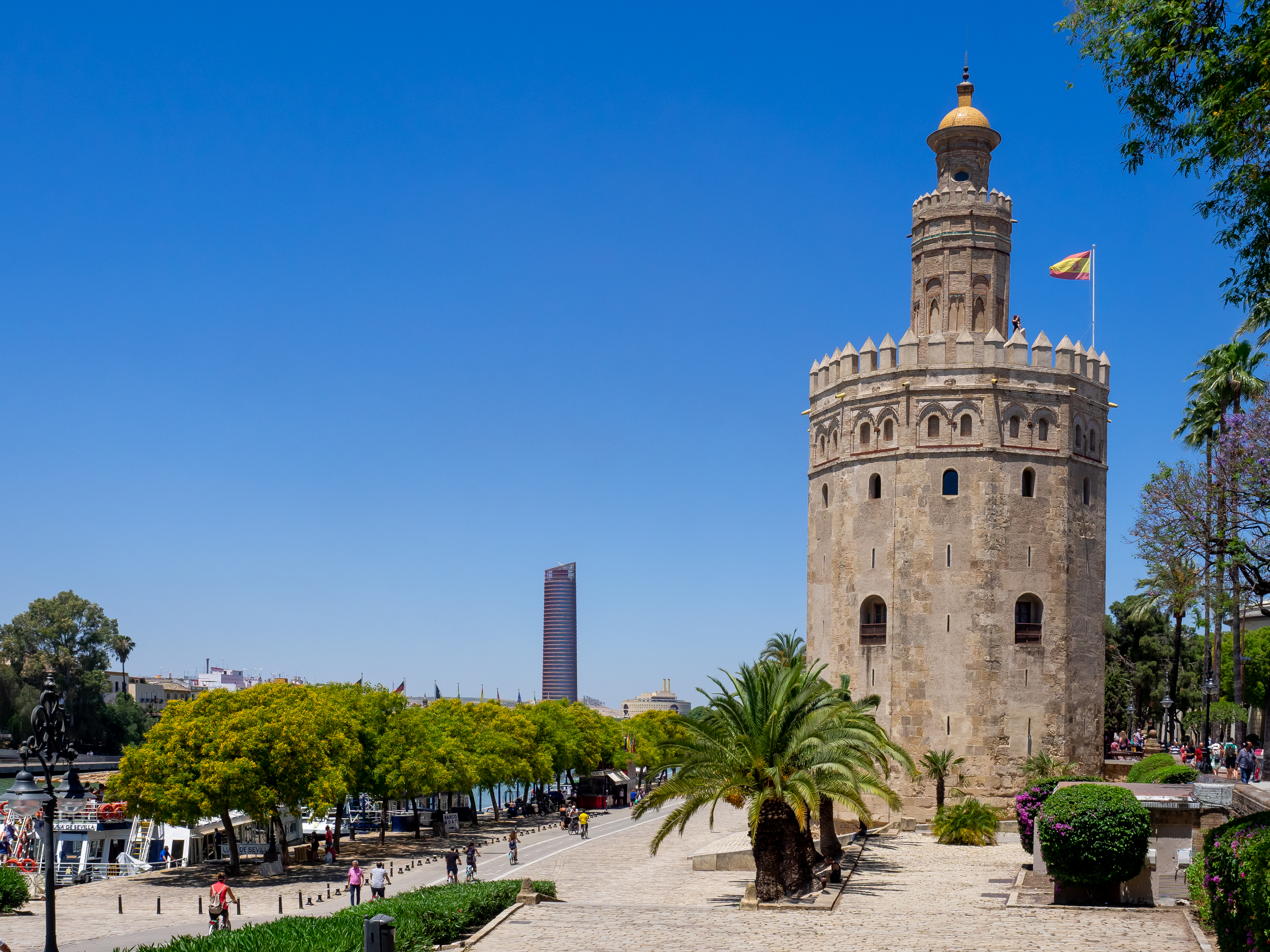
Torre del Oro in Seville, an Almohad defensive tower built in 1220–1221

Later on, the Almohads (12th and early 13th centuries) were particularly active in the restoration and construction of fortresses and city walls across the regions under their control to counter the growing threat of the Christian Reconquista. The fortress of Alcalá de Guadaíra is a clear example dating from this time, as well as the Paderne Castle in present-day Portugal. The walls of Seville and Silves also date from this time, both of them either built, restored, or expanded by the Almoravids and Almohads. Military technology again became more sophisticated, with barbicans appearing in front of city walls and albarrana towers appearing as a recurring innovation. Both Córdoba and Seville were reinforced by the Almohads with a set of double walls in rammed earth, consisting of a main wall with regular bastion towers and a smaller outer wall, both topped by a walkway (chemin de ronde) with battlements. Fortification towers also became taller and more massive, sometimes with round or polygonal bases but more commonly still rectangular. Some of the more famous tower fortifications from this period include the Calahorra Tower in Cordoba, which guarded the outer end of the old Roman bridge, and the Torre del Oro in Seville, a dodecagonal tower which fortified a corner of the city walls and which, along with another tower across the river, protected the city's harbour.

== Nasrid period (13th to 15th centuries) ==
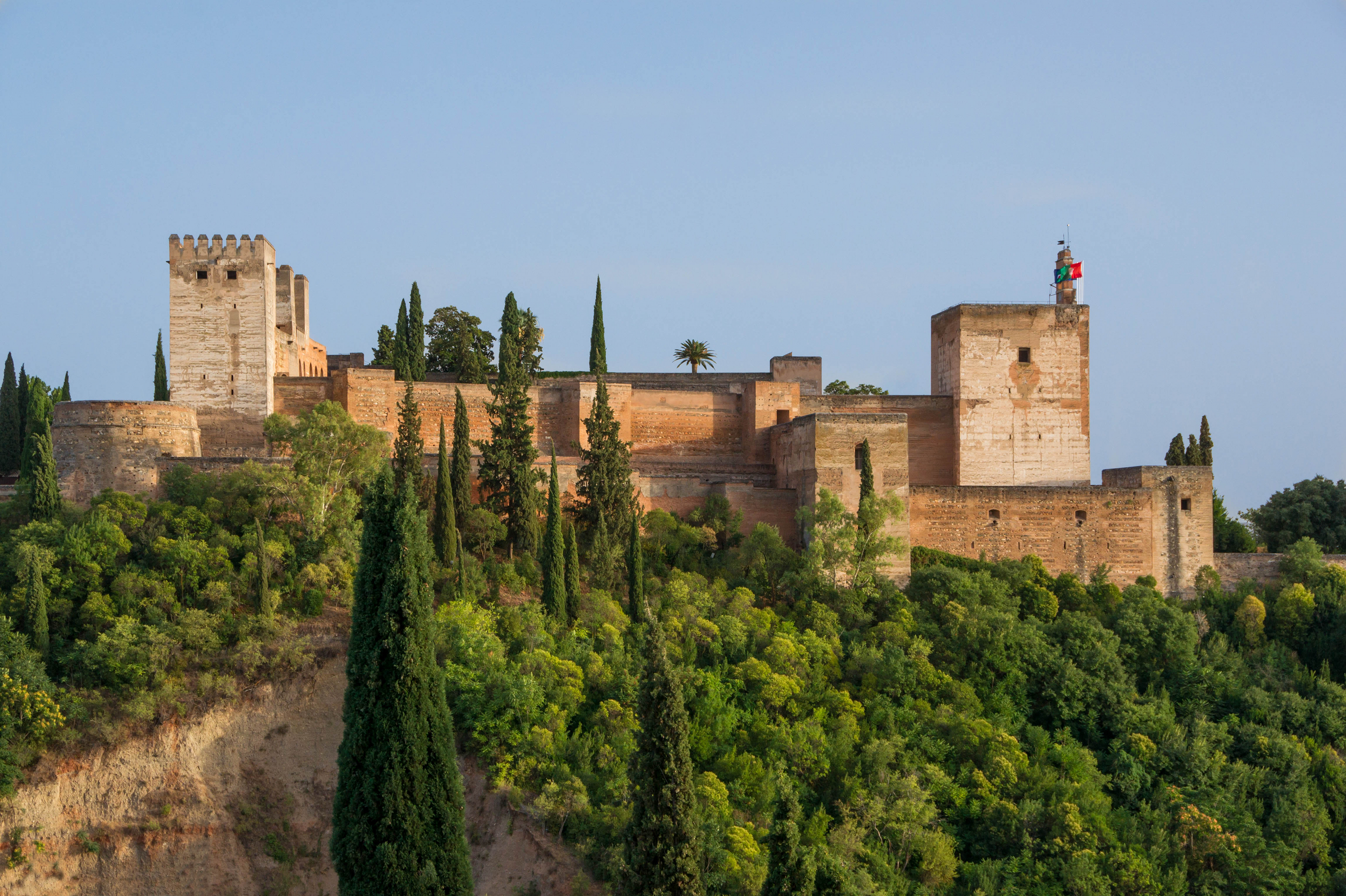
The Alcazaba of the Alhambra, built in the 13th century over older foundations

In the 13th–15th centuries, during the final period of Muslim rule in Al-Andalus, fortresses and towns were again refortified by either the Nasrids or (in fewer cases) the Marinids. In addition to the fortifications of Granada and its Alhambra, the Nasrids built or rebuilt the Gibralfaro Castle of Málaga and the castle of Antequera, and many smaller strategic hilltop forts like that of Tabernas. A fortified arsenal (dar as-sina'a) was also built in Málaga, which served as a Nasrid naval base. This late period saw the construction of massive towers and keeps which likely reflected a growing influence of Christian military architecture. The Calahorra Tower (now known as the Torre de Homenaje) of the Moorish Castle in Gibraltar is one particular example of this, built by the Marinids in the 14th century.

== See also ==
- Fortifications of the Maghreb
