= BC Mahdia =

- Leagues: Championnat Pro A
- Founded: 1995; 31 years ago
- Arena: Salle Rached-Khouja
- Capacity: 2,000
- Location: Mahdia
- Team colors: Blue and white
Home	Away

The Basketball Club Mahdia is a Tunisian basketball club founded in 1995 and based in Mahdia. During the 2023–24 season, BC Mahdia won the Championnat Nationale 1 and moved up to Championnat Pro A.

== Honours ==
- Championnat Nationale 1

Champions (1): 2023–24
