= Aristeus (ancient Greece) =

Aristeus or Aristeas (Ancient Greek: Ἀριστέας) is the name of a number of people from classical antiquity. It may refer to:

- Aristeus, 5th century BCE Corinthian general
- Aristeus, son of Pellichus (possibly the same Pellichus immortalized in one of the sculptures of Demetrius of Alopece), also a military general from Corinth, was one of the commanders of the Corinthian fleet sent against Epidamnos in 436 BCE.
- Aristeus, a military commander from Sparta active around 423 BCE.
- Aristeus of Argos, son of Cheimon, won in the Dolichos event at the ancient Olympic games.
