= Khaled Abdul-Wahab =

Tunisian official (1911–1997)

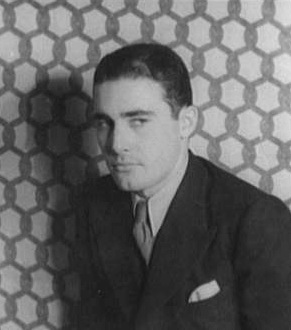
- Khaled Abdul Wahab in 1936
- Born: 1 March 1911; French protectorate of Tunisia
- Died: 4 September 1997 (aged 86); Tunisia

Khaled Abdul-Wahab (1 March 1911 – 4 September 1997) was a Tunisian Arab Muslim man who saved several Jewish families from Nazi persecution, in Vichy-controlled Tunisia during the Holocaust. He has been called the 'Tunisian Schindler'.

== Wartime rescue of Jews ==
Abdul-Wahab, the son of a wealthy aristocratic family, had frequently travelled abroad during his youth, mostly to France. Before the war he had studied art and architecture in New York. He was 31 when German troops occupied Vichy Tunisia in November 1942. French Tunisia was then home to approximately 100,000 Jews. Under the Nazis' anti-Semitic policies, they were forced to wear yellow badges and were subject to fines and having their property confiscated. More than 5,000 Tunisian Jews were sent to forced labor camps, where 46 are known to have died. Another 160 Tunisian Jews in France were sent to European death camps.

Abdul-Wahab, acting as an interlocutor between the Nazis and the population of the coastal town of Mahdia, heard that German officers were planning to rape a local Jewish woman, whom he realized must be Odette Boukris, the wife of an acquaintance. He plied the German with wine until the German was drunk and drove to the oil factory where the family had taken refuge, and picked up the Boukris family and their neighbours, the Ouzzan family, 25 people, and took them to his family's farm, and kept them there for 4 months, allocating a small room to each family member. Despite the contiguity of Khaled's farm to a Red Cross camp where injured German soldiers were tended, none of the farm-hands, who knew of the presence of these hidden Jews, revealed the fact. They stayed until the Nazi occupation ended, and in April 1943, with the arrival of the British at Mahdia, all the families returned to their homes.

In December 1942, he helped save a Jewish family of nearly two dozen people. One of them was Eva Boukris, 13 years old at the time. All able-bodied men of Boukris' family were ordered into forced labour by the Germans. The family was offered protection by Khaled who ferried all the women, children and old men to his farm. The family was provided lodging by Khaled in the stables of his farm. Soon after a German unit arrived in the area. Khaled instructed the family to hide their yellow badges, stay in the courtyard and keep away from the main house. In order to keep the family hidden, he invited the German unit to his house. By the night, two drunk German soldiers wandered to the courtyard. They started banging on the door of the courtyard saying, "We know you're Jews and we're coming to get you!" The family upon hearing these threats hid all the girls. Khaled reached there and managed to convince the Germans to leave the family alone. Next day he apologised to the family for the threats by the German soldiers and promised them that such an incident would never happen again. Eva and her family passed the rest of the German occupation on his farm.

== "Righteous Among the Nations" ==
Robert Satloff, who had been searching for records of Arabs who had saved Jews from the Holocaust, was first informed of Abdul-Wahab by Odette Boukris' daughter, Anny Boukris, who had also been hidden by Abdul-Wahab at the age of 11; shortly after recording her testimony, she died at age 71. Satloff then went to Mahdia and confirmed the story.

Although nominated, Abdul-Wahab still has to be approved by the Yad Vashem commission that grants the honor. Yad Vashem has conferred the honor on 60 Muslims, including Turks, Tatars and Bosnians, with Mohammed Helmy as the only such Arab. Most of the Muslims who received the award were Albanians. Abdul-Wahab's case has already been once studied by the Righteous Among the Nations Department of Yad Vashem but it was declined on the basis that Khaled Abdul-Wahab did not risk his own life; that he had "hosted" rather than hidden Jews, and that the Germans were aware of the presence of Jews on his family's farm. Saving Jews in Tunisia was not against the law at the time and the saviors did not risk their own lives and safety which is a necessary condition in proclaiming a person Righteous Among the Nations. His daughter Faiza Abdul Wahab commented: "My father opened his home to Jews and Yad Vashem did not open their home to us." Specifically, investigations revealed, through interviews with Anny Boukris and Edmee Masliah (Ouzzan), that the Germans were fully aware of the situation, that the male Jews continued to work under German supervision, and that, during German visits, the group would put on their yellow badges in order to be counted to ensure none had escaped in the meanwhile. They also were furnished with medicine by the German Red Cross facility nearby.

== See also ==
- Arab and Muslim rescue efforts during the Holocaust

== Filmography ==
- Khaled, documentary by Emmanuel Berrebi (2002)
