= Puerta de Alcántara =

Cultural property in Toledo, Spain

Coordinates: 39.8603°N 4.0183°W

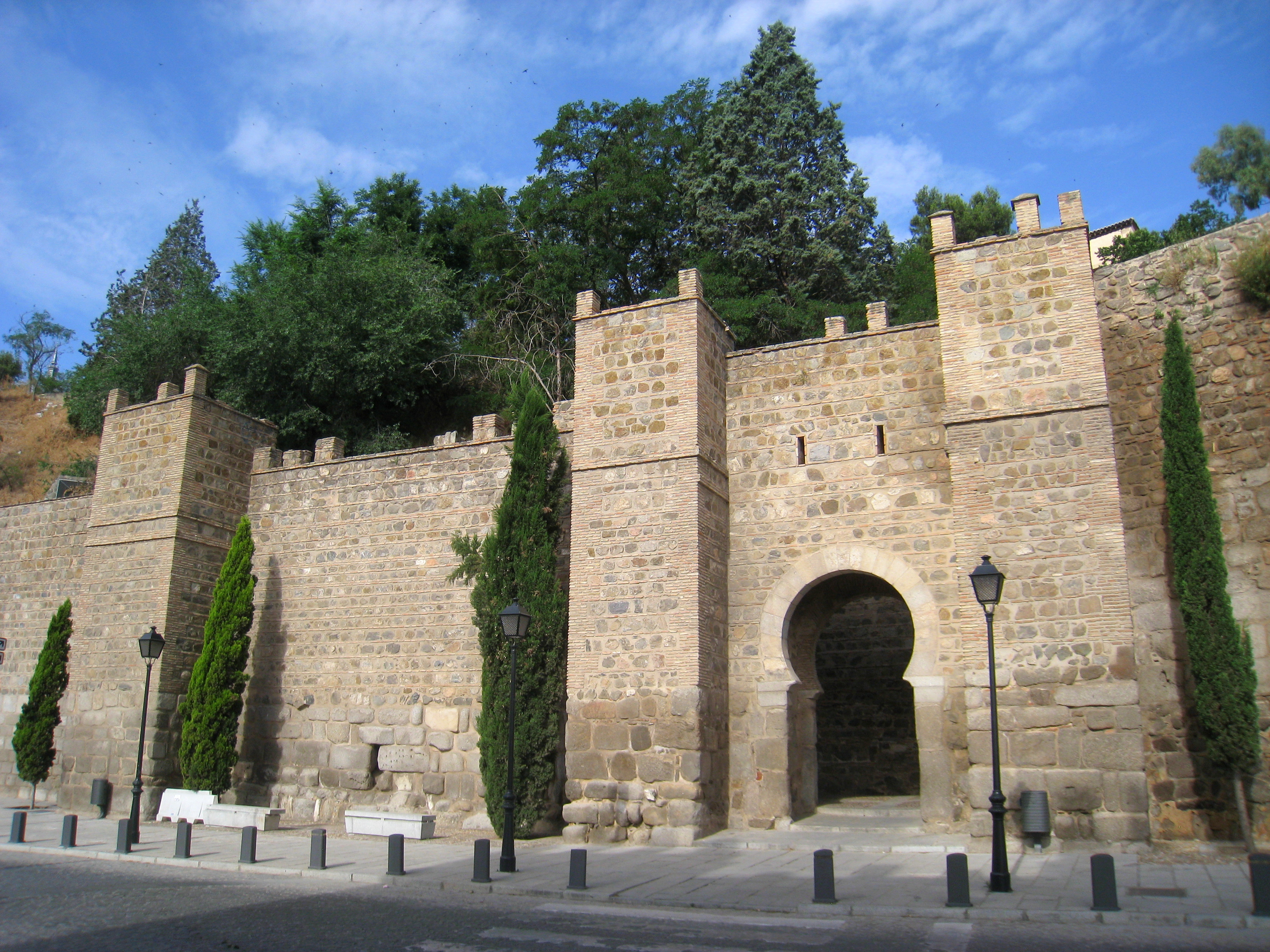
The Puerta de Alcántara, on the eastern side of the walls of Toledo.

The Alcantara Gate (Spanish: Puerta de Alcántara) is a city gate located in Toledo, in Castile-La Mancha, Spain. It gives access to the interior of the historic center of the city, passing through its eastern side the surrounding wall. It is in front of the bridge called Puente de Alcántara, that crosses the Tagus river and that in turn is protected by two gates fortified in its ends.

Of Arab origin, it dates from around the 10th century, although important modifications were made during the Christian era. It had great relevance in the defense of the city during the Middle Ages, to be the place through which people and goods entered. The gate is a gateway in a bend, typical of Hispanic-Muslim military engineering, and its main consists of a horseshoe arch located between two square towers and crenellated with arrowslits on its sides.
