= Aphrodisium (Arcadia) =

Ancient town of Arcadia

Coordinates: 37°23′15″N 22°13′06″E

Aphrodisium or Aphrodision (Ancient Greek: Ἀφροδίσιον) was a town in ancient Arcadia, in the district Maenalia. It was not far from Megalopolis, on the road to Megalopolis and Tegea.

Its site is near the modern Marmaria/Ag. Ioannis.
