= Aristeas (sculptor) =

Aristeas (Ancient Greek: Ἀριστέας) was part of a duo, along with Papias, of sculptors from Aphrodisium in Cyprus who made the two statues of centaurs, known as the Furietti Centaurs, in dark grey marble which were found at Hadrian's Villa at Tivoli, Lazio in 1746, and are now in the Capitoline Museums.

The statues bear the inscription ΑΡΙΣΤΕΑΣ ΚΑΙ ΠΑΠΙΑΣ ΑΦΡΟΔΙΣΙΕΙΣ. From the style of the statues, and from the place where they were discovered, German art historian Johann Joachim Winckelmann supposed that they were made during the reign of Hadrian. Other statues of centaurs have been discovered, very much like those of Aristeas and Papias, but of better workmanship, from which some writers have inferred that the latter are only copies. The two centaurs are fully described by Winckelmann, and figured by sculptors Bartolomeo Cavaceppi and Giovanni Battista Foggini.
