= Demetrius of Alopece =

Greek sculptor

Demetrius of Alopece (Greek: Δημήτριος) was a Greek sculptor of the early part of the 4th century BC, who is said by ancient critics to have been notable for the lifelike realism of his statues. His portrait of Pellichus, a Corinthian general, "with fat paunch and bald head, wearing a cloak which leaves him half exposed, with some of the hairs of his head flowing in the wind, and prominent veins", was admired by Lucian. He was contrasted with Cresilas, an idealizing sculptor of the generation before. Since, however, the peculiarities mentioned by Lucian do not appear in Greek portraits before the 3rd century BC, and since the Greek art of the 4th century consistently idealizes the images concerned, there would seem to be a difficulty to explain.

The date of Demetrius given above is confirmed by inscriptions found on the Athenian Acropolis.
