= Skifa Kahla =

City gate in Mahdia, Tunisia

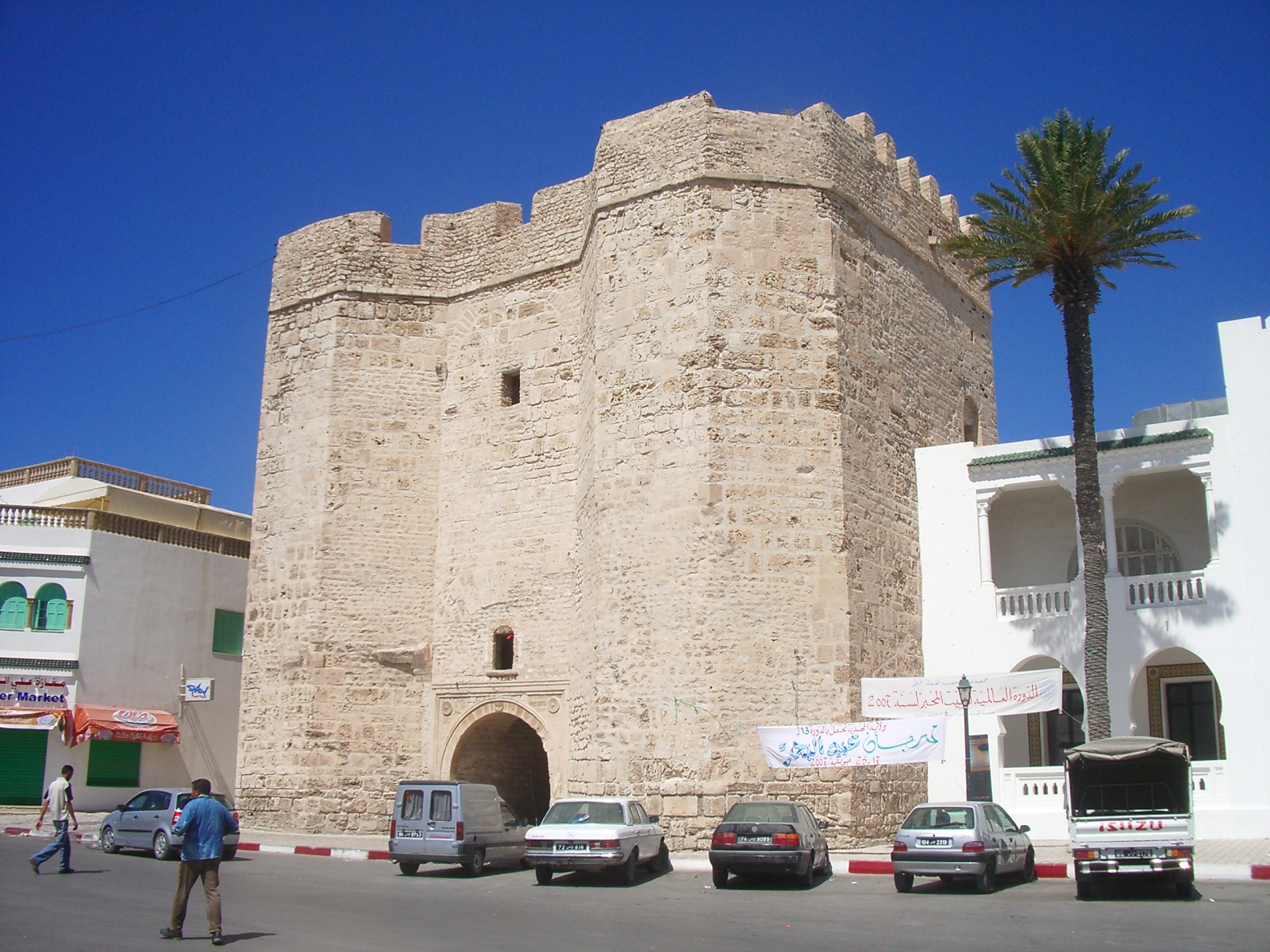

General information
- Architectural style: Fatimid
- Town or city: Mahdia
- Country: Tunisia
- Coordinates: 35.503949°N 11.068746°E

The Skifa Kahla (Arabic: السقيفة الكحلة), also known as Bab Zouila, is a fortification of the 10th century, the structure is one of the few remnants of the ancient walls of Mahdia in Tunisia. The building was built by the Fatimids, in which it was used as the main fort to protect the access to the city. The fort is one of the few remnants of the ancient ramparts, as well as being one of the access points to the historic center of Mahdia.

== History ==
The construction of the building dates back to 916. The building was constructed by the order of the first Fatimid caliph, Abd Allah al-Mahdi Billah. The design of the structure is based on Fatimid architecture. In the 11th century, modifications were made to the building to accommodate more artillery made by the Turks, rooms and warehouses were also built to house weapons and ammunition. The building has survived the siege of the city of Mahdia executed by the monarch Charles V. For a time, the building was the only land entrance to the city of Mahdia. The building served as a defense to prevent Christian invasions as well as imperial wars to the city of Mahdia. According to historians, including some from Spain, it is said that the name "Skifa Kahla" means "Dark Vestibule" (French: Vestibule Noir). In 1554, a group of Spaniards blew up the entrance to the building. After the attacks by the Spaniards, the building underwent several modifications. At the end of the 16th century, the building's wall system was rebuilt by Turks. Skifa Kahla served as the main tower for the second line of defense of the city. In 2015, several concrete restorations were made to the building. The building renovations were conducted by the Tunisian National Heritage Institute to commemorate the 1200th anniversary of the founding of the city of Mahdia.

== Structure ==
The tower of the building is surrounded by walls built during the Ottoman era. The height of the tower counts 18.5 meters, a depth of 12.70 and a width of 12 meters, the building contains a corridor leading to the markets of the old city of Mahdia which has 6 iron doors. The building contains two polygonal projections dating from the 17th century. The structure of the fort comprises a vaulted passage which is divided into sections by gate-loops in addition to a portcullis.

== Gallery ==
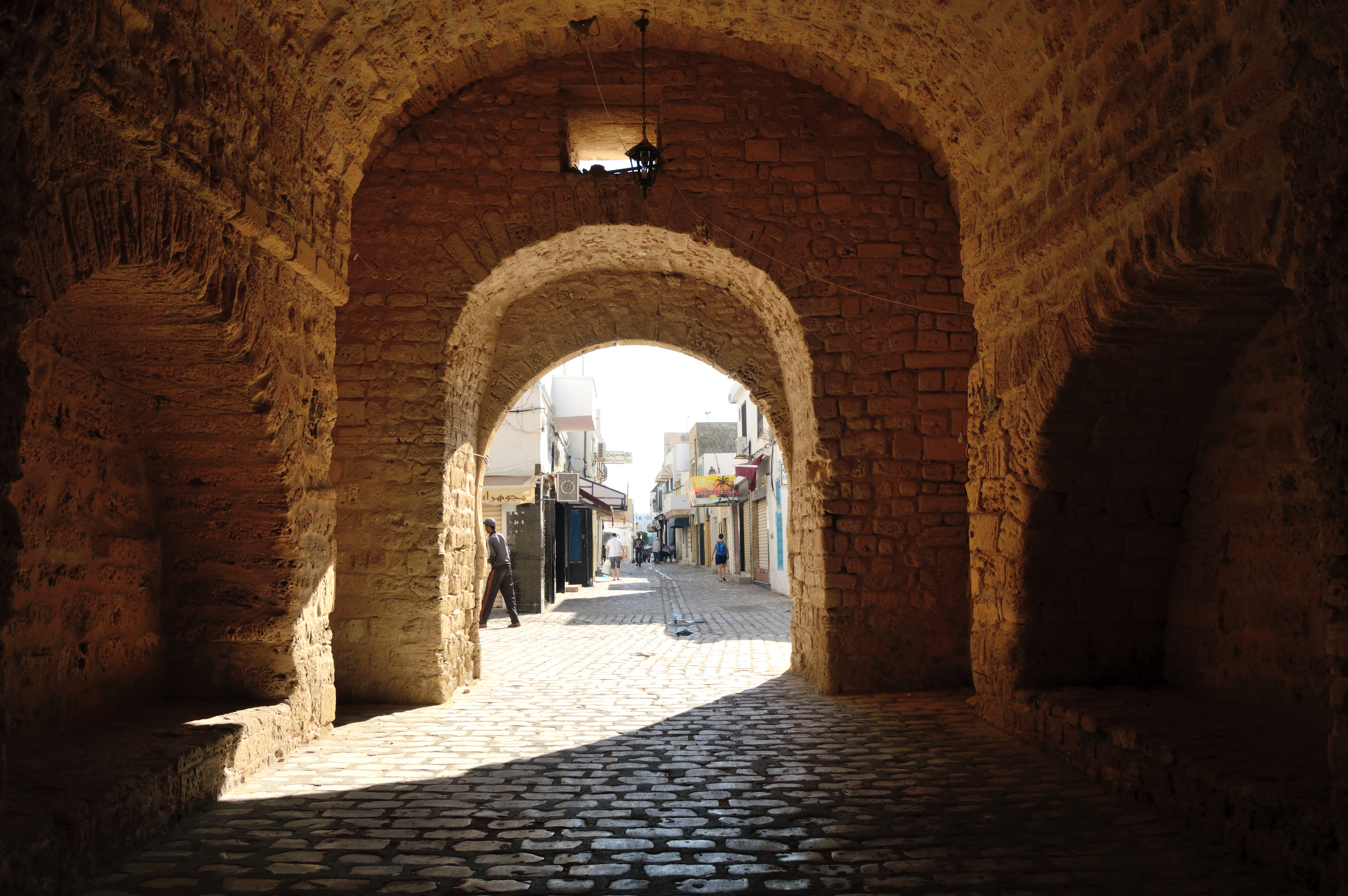

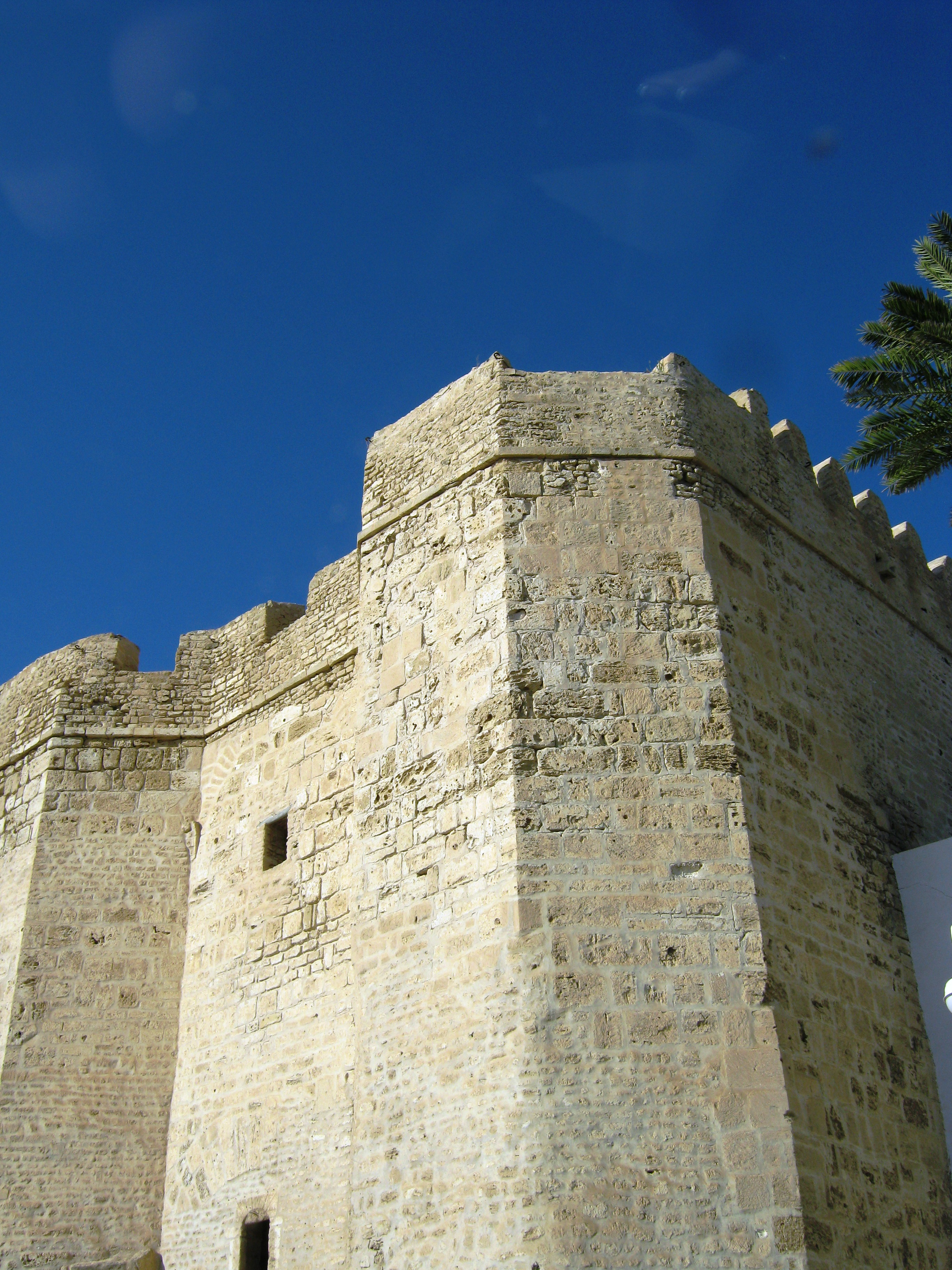

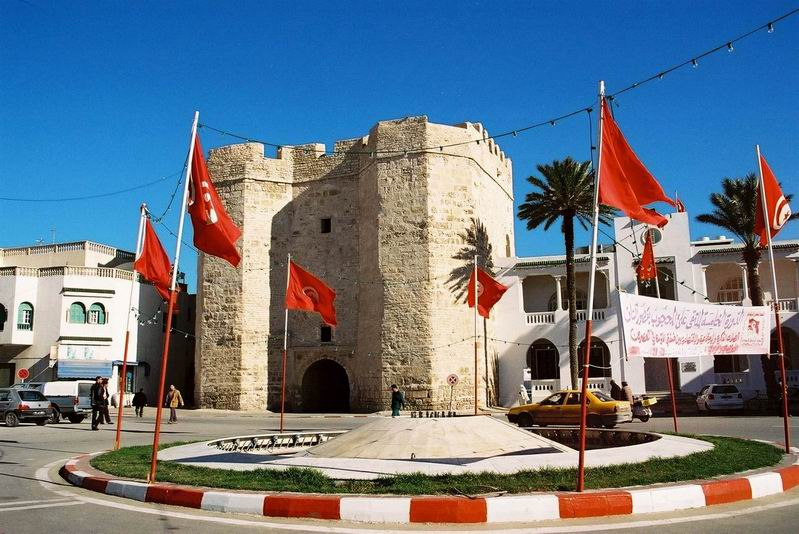
