= Aphrodisium (Cyprus) =

Ancient city in Cyprus

Coordinates: 35°24′04″N 33°44′22″E

Aphrodisium or Aphrodision (Ancient Greek: Ἀφροδίσιον), also known as Aphrodisias (Ἀφροδισιάς), was a city of ancient Cyprus, situated at the narrowest part of the island, only 70 stadia from Salamis.

It thrived from the Hellenistic period into the Early Byzantine era, before gradually declining and being abandoned following the first Arab raids in 647 A.D.

Its site is near the modern Liastrika, Akanthou, in the de facto Turkish Republic of Northern Cyprus.
