= Mahdia =

City in Mahdia Governorate, Tunisia

Mahdia المهدية
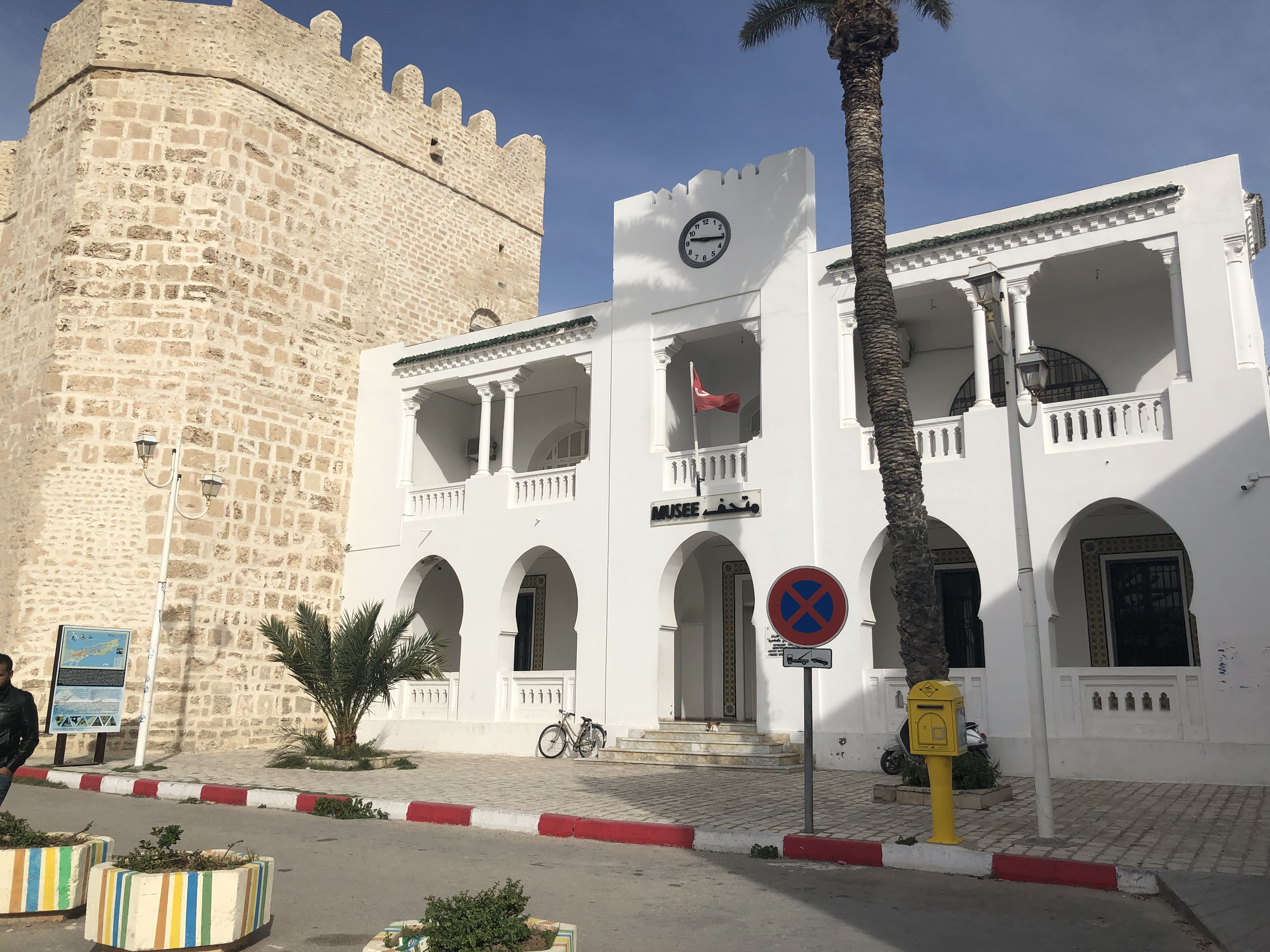
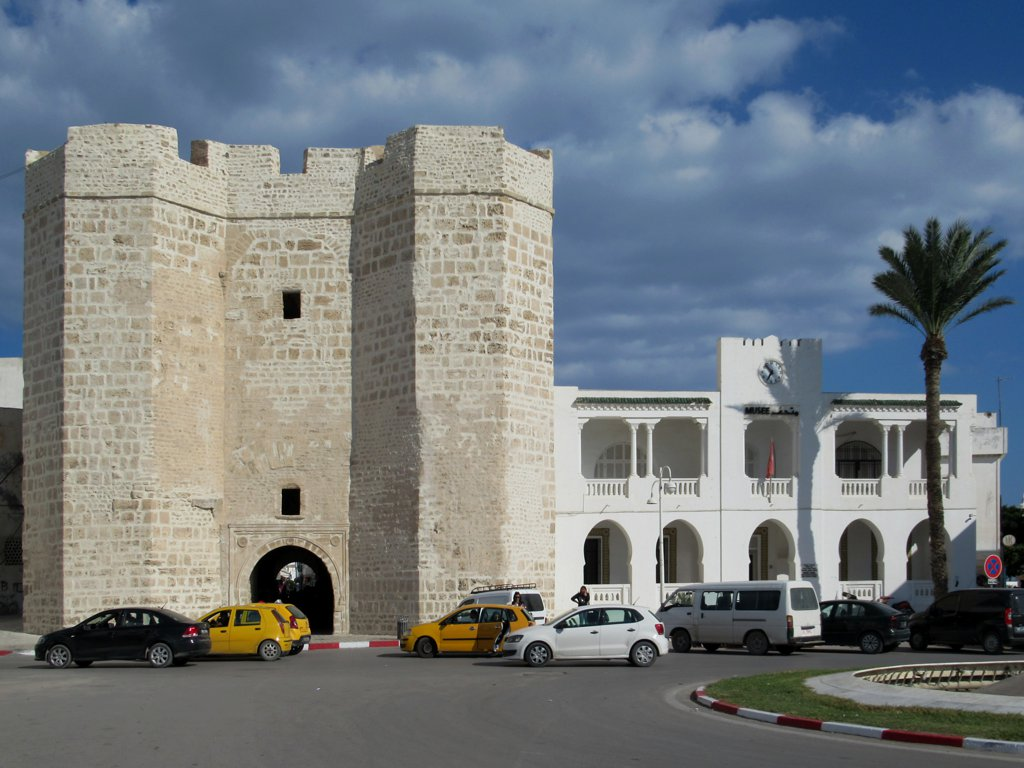
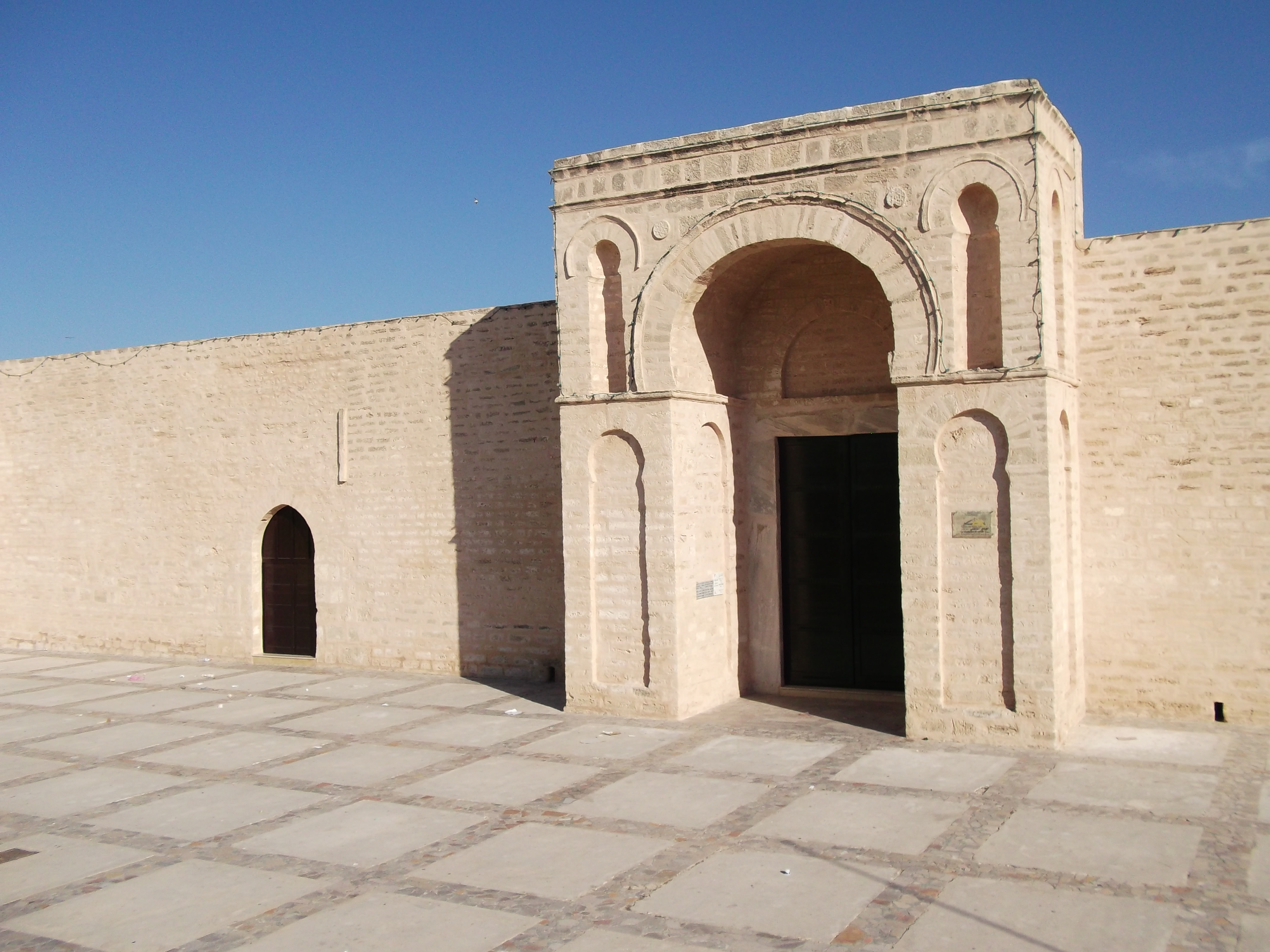
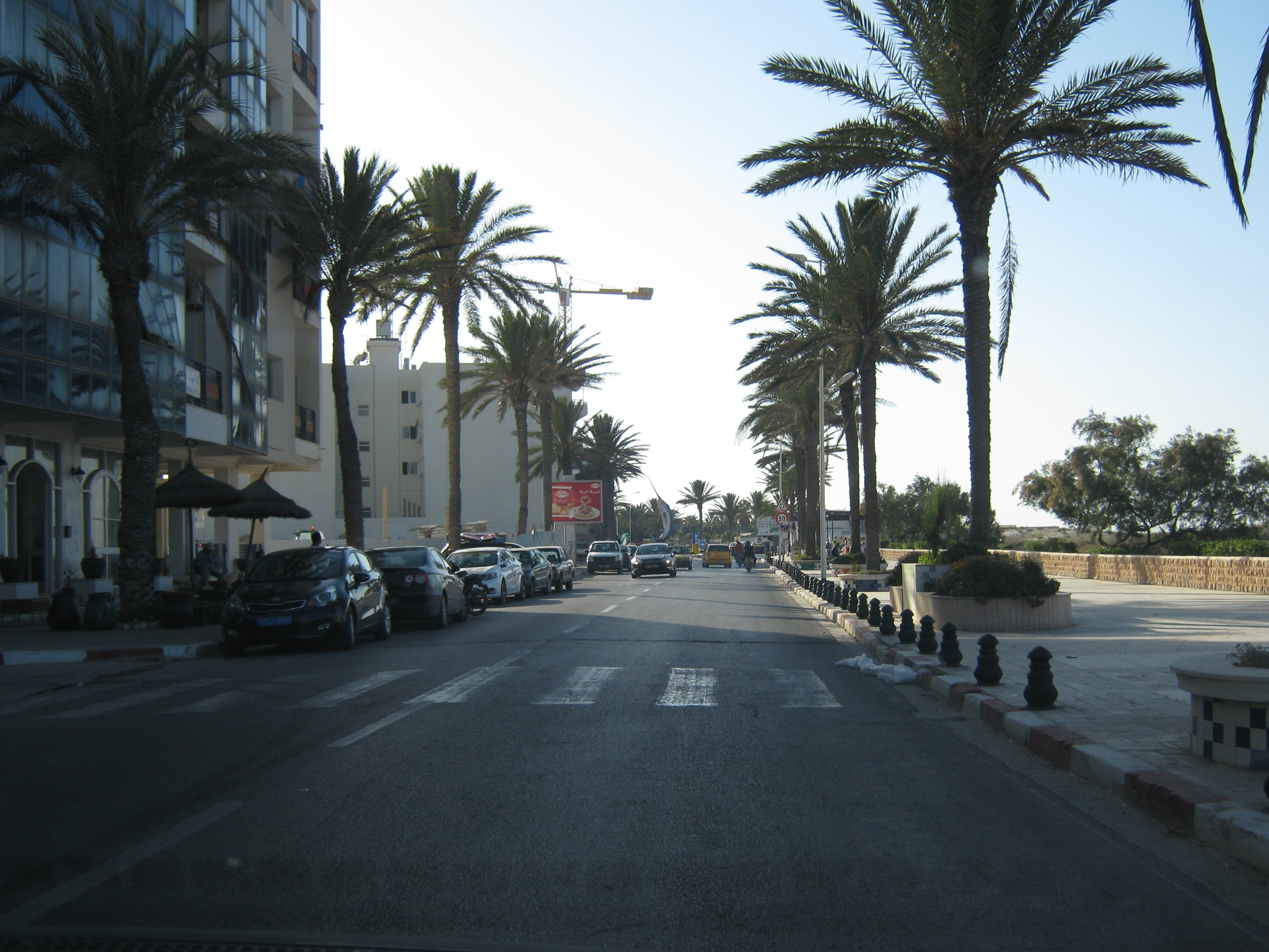
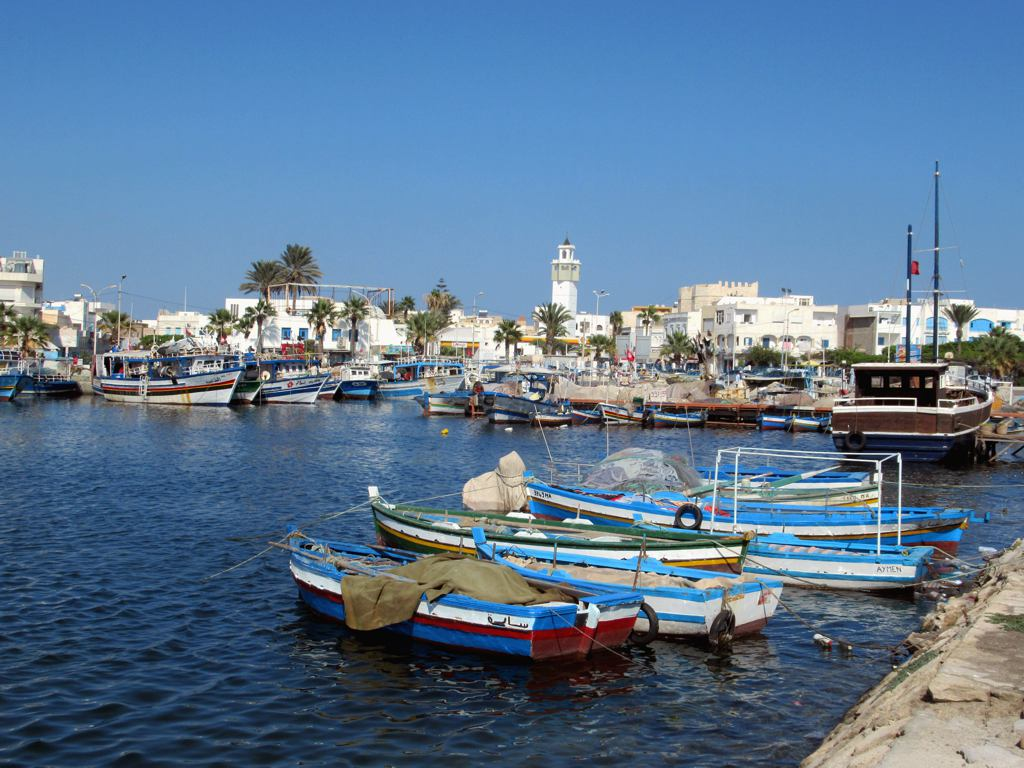
- Clockwise from top: Mahdia Museum, the Great Mosque of Mahdia, the port of Mahdia, a street in Mahdia, the Skifa al-Kahla.

- Seal

- Location in Tunisia
- Coordinates: 35°30′N 11°04′E
- Country: Tunisia
- Governorate: Mahdia Governorate
- Delegation(s): Mahdia

Government
  - Mayor: Faiza Boubaker Belkhir (Independent)

Population (2022)
  - Total: 76,513
- Time zone: UTC1 (CET)

Mahdia (Arabic: المهدية al-Mahdīyah) is a Tunisian coastal city with 76,513 inhabitants, south of Monastir and southeast of Sousse.

Mahdia is a provincial centre north of Sfax. It is important for the associated fish-processing industry, as well as weaving. It is the capital of Mahdia Governorate.

== History ==
=== Antiquity ===
The old part of Mahdia corresponds to the Roman city called Aphrodisium and, later, called Africa (a name perhaps derived from the older name), or Cape Africa. The Catholic Church's list of titular sees includes a no longer residential bishopric called Africa and, since there is no record of an episcopal see in Roman times called by either of these names (nor by that of Alipota, another Roman town that Charles Tissot suggested tentatively might be represented by present-day Mehdia), it is supposed that the episcopal see of Africa was established when the city was held by the Kingdom of Sicily, as a part of the Kingdom of Africa (1147–1160) and when Pope Eugene III consecrated a bishop for it in 1148. An inventory of movable property of the church of Africa (inventarium thesauri Africani) exists in an archive of the Cappella Palatina of Palermo in Sicily. Salim Dev identified Mahdia instead with ancient Ruspae or Ruspe, which is more commonly taken to have been at Henchir Sbia (or just Sbia), north of Mahdia, or at the ruins known as Ksour Siad. The most illustrious bishop of this see was Fulgentius of Ruspe. The Catholic Church's list of titular sees, which identifies the see of Africa as Mahdia, identifies Ruspe/Ruspae as Henchir Sbia.

The Mahdia shipwreck – a sunken ship found off Mahdia's shore, containing Greek art treasures – is dated to about 80 BC, the early part of Roman rule in this region.

=== Islamic era ===
Muslim Mahdia was founded by the Fatimids under the Caliph Abdallah al-Mahdi and made the capital of Ifriqiya. As the then-newly-created Fatimid Caliphate was a Shi'a regime supported by a Berber Kutama military, the caliph may have been motivated to move his capital here so as to put some distance between his power base and the predominantly Sunni city of Kairouan (the traditional capital of Ifriqiya up to that point). Construction began in 916 and the new city was officially inaugurated on 20 February 921, although some construction continued afterward. In addition to its heavy fortified walls, the city included the Fatimid palaces, an artificial harbor, and a congregational mosque (the Great Mosque of Mahdia). Most of the Fatimid city has not survived to the present day. The mosque, however, is one of the most well-preserved Fatimid monuments in the Maghreb, although it has been extensively damaged over time and was in large part reconstructed by archeologists in the 1960s. Fragments of mosaic pavements from the palaces have also been discovered from modern excavations.

The Zirid dynasty, which succeeded the Fatimids in the Maghreb, moved their capital here in 1057. In 1087, the town was attacked by raiding ships from Genoa and Pisa who burned the Muslim fleet in the harbor. The attack played a critical role in Christians' seizure of control of the Western Mediterranean, which allowed the First Crusade to be supplied by sea. Their rule was brought to an end by the Norman conquest of the city in 1148. In 1160 the city came under Almohad rule.

al-Bakri, in the 11th century, wrote about the city:

"The city of Mahdia is named after Ubayd Allah al-Mahdi, who built it, as mentioned in historical records. It is sixty miles from Kairouan. The sea surrounds it on three sides, and it can only be entered from the western side. It has a large suburb known as Zwaila, where markets, public baths, and the homes of its inhabitants are located. Al-Mu‘izz ibn Badis built a wall around this suburb. The city itself is about two miles long, with its width varying—it is never as wide as its full length. All its buildings are made of stone. The city has iron gates with no wood in them, each gate weighing a thousand quintals. Each gate is thirty spans long, with each nail in them weighing six pounds. The gates are decorated with depictions of animals. [..] Mahdia serves as a harbor for ships from Alexandria, the Levant, Sicily, al-Andalus, and other places. Its port is carved into solid rock and can accommodate thirty ships."

The role of the capital was taken over by Tunis in the 12th century during the Almohad era, which it remained during the Hafsid Dynasty. Later the city was subject to many raids. In 1390 it was the target of the Barbary Crusade, when a French army laid siege to the city but failed to take it.

The city was captured by the Spaniards in 1550. A Spanish garrison remained there until 1553. Charles V then offered the charge of the town to the Order of Saint John who ruled Malta but they refused it deeming it too expensive. The emperor ordered the Viceroy of Sicily, Juan de Vega, to dismantle Mahdia despite it being a strategically important stronghold. The demolition tasks were carried out by Hernando de Acuña. Shortly after Mahdia was reoccupied by the Ottomans, but only to live by fishing and oil-works, and the town lost its logistic and commercial importance. It remained under Turkish rule until the 19th century.

During the Nazi Occupation of Tunisia in World War II, Mahdia was the site where Khaled Abdelwahhab hid approximately two dozen persecuted Jews.

== Transport ==
Gare Mahdia forms the southern terminus of the metre-gauge Sahel Metro railway line, which runs from Sousse and Monastir.

== Climate ==
Climate data for Mahdia (1991–2020, extremes 1951–2017)
| Month | Jan | Feb | Mar | Apr | May | Jun | Jul | Aug | Sep | Oct | Nov | Dec | Year |
|---|---|---|---|---|---|---|---|---|---|---|---|---|---|
| Record high °C (°F) | 27.0 (80.6) | 36.5 (97.7) | 34.1 (93.4) | 36.2 (97.2) | 43.8 (110.8) | 48.3 (118.9) | 44.0 (111.2) | 45.0 (113.0) | 42.6 (108.7) | 39.3 (102.7) | 31.6 (88.9) | 30.0 (86.0) | 48.3 (118.9) |
| Mean daily maximum °C (°F) | 16.8 (62.2) | 16.9 (62.4) | 18.6 (65.5) | 20.6 (69.1) | 23.7 (74.7) | 27.5 (81.5) | 30.5 (86.9) | 31.5 (88.7) | 28.9 (84.0) | 26.0 (78.8) | 21.8 (71.2) | 18.2 (64.8) | 23.4 (74.1) |
| Daily mean °C (°F) | 12.8 (55.0) | 13.0 (55.4) | 14.8 (58.6) | 17.0 (62.6) | 20.2 (68.4) | 23.8 (74.8) | 26.7 (80.1) | 27.6 (81.7) | 25.6 (78.1) | 22.6 (72.7) | 17.8 (64.0) | 14.1 (57.4) | 19.7 (67.5) |
| Mean daily minimum °C (°F) | 8.8 (47.8) | 9.0 (48.2) | 11.0 (51.8) | 13.5 (56.3) | 16.6 (61.9) | 20.2 (68.4) | 23.0 (73.4) | 24.0 (75.2) | 22.3 (72.1) | 19.2 (66.6) | 13.8 (56.8) | 10.0 (50.0) | 15.9 (60.6) |
| Record low °C (°F) | 0.1 (32.2) | 0.2 (32.4) | 2.0 (35.6) | 1.2 (34.2) | 0.9 (33.6) | 4.9 (40.8) | 11.0 (51.8) | 9.0 (48.2) | 8.0 (46.4) | 7.0 (44.6) | 3.0 (37.4) | 0.1 (32.2) | 0.1 (32.2) |
| Average precipitation mm (inches) | 37.7 (1.48) | 33.6 (1.32) | 33.0 (1.30) | 18.4 (0.72) | 18.9 (0.74) | 5.9 (0.23) | 1.5 (0.06) | 9.4 (0.37) | 67.1 (2.64) | 44.5 (1.75) | 41.3 (1.63) | 47.3 (1.86) | 385.6 (15.18) |
| Average precipitation days (≥ 1.0 mm) | 4.6 | 4.1 | 3.8 | 3.4 | 2.6 | 0.8 | 0.2 | 1.2 | 4.8 | 4.1 | 3.8 | 4.8 | 38.3 |
| Average relative humidity (%) | 74.6 | 74.8 | 76.0 | 74.7 | 74.0 | 71.0 | 68.8 | 68.7 | 75.0 | 76.0 | 72.2 | 76.0 | 73.5 |
Source 1: Institut National de la Météorologie (humidity 1961–1990) (Note: The Station ID for Mahdia is 34242111.)
Source 2: NOAA

== Gallery of images ==
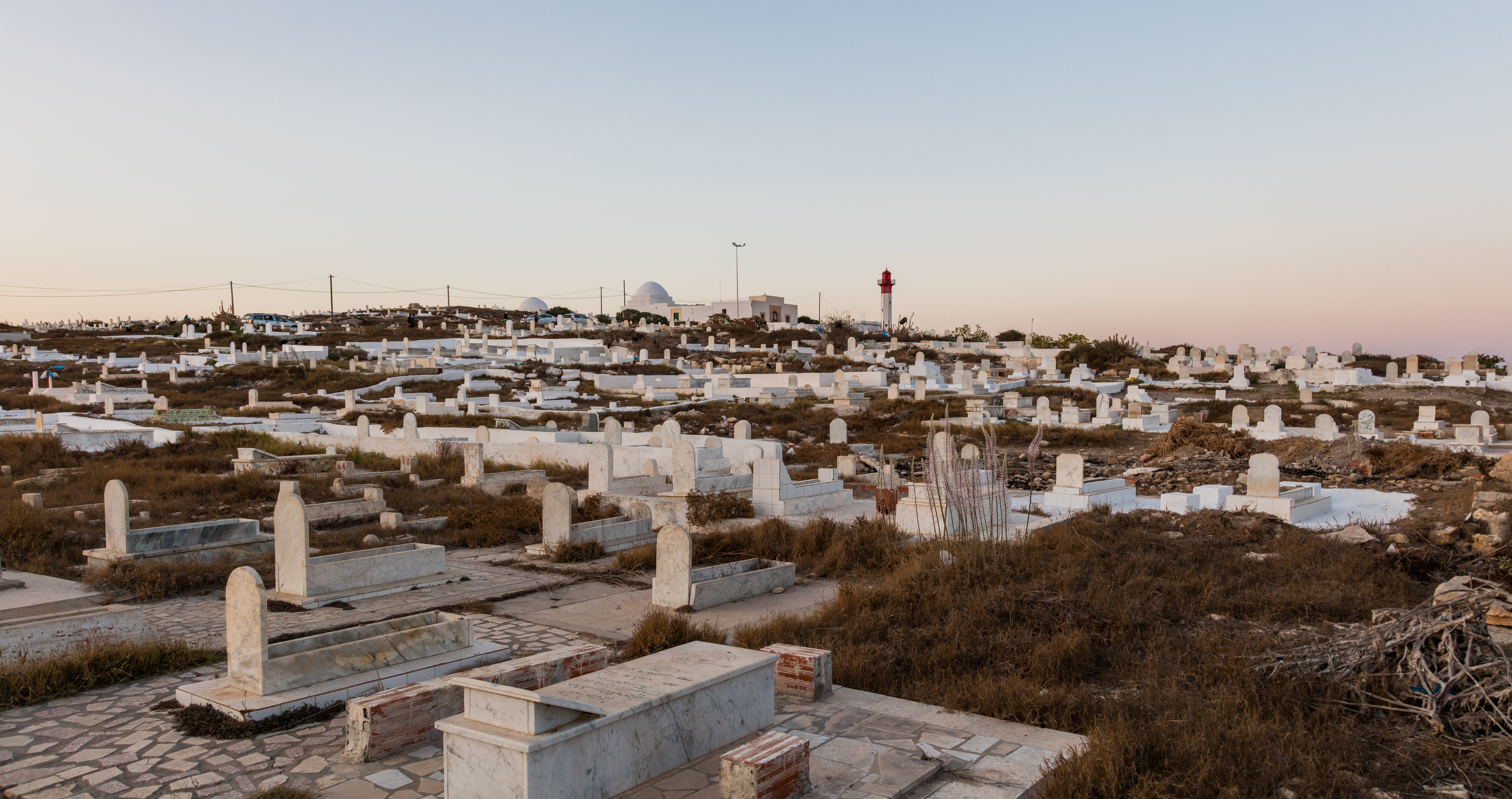
Marine cemetery.

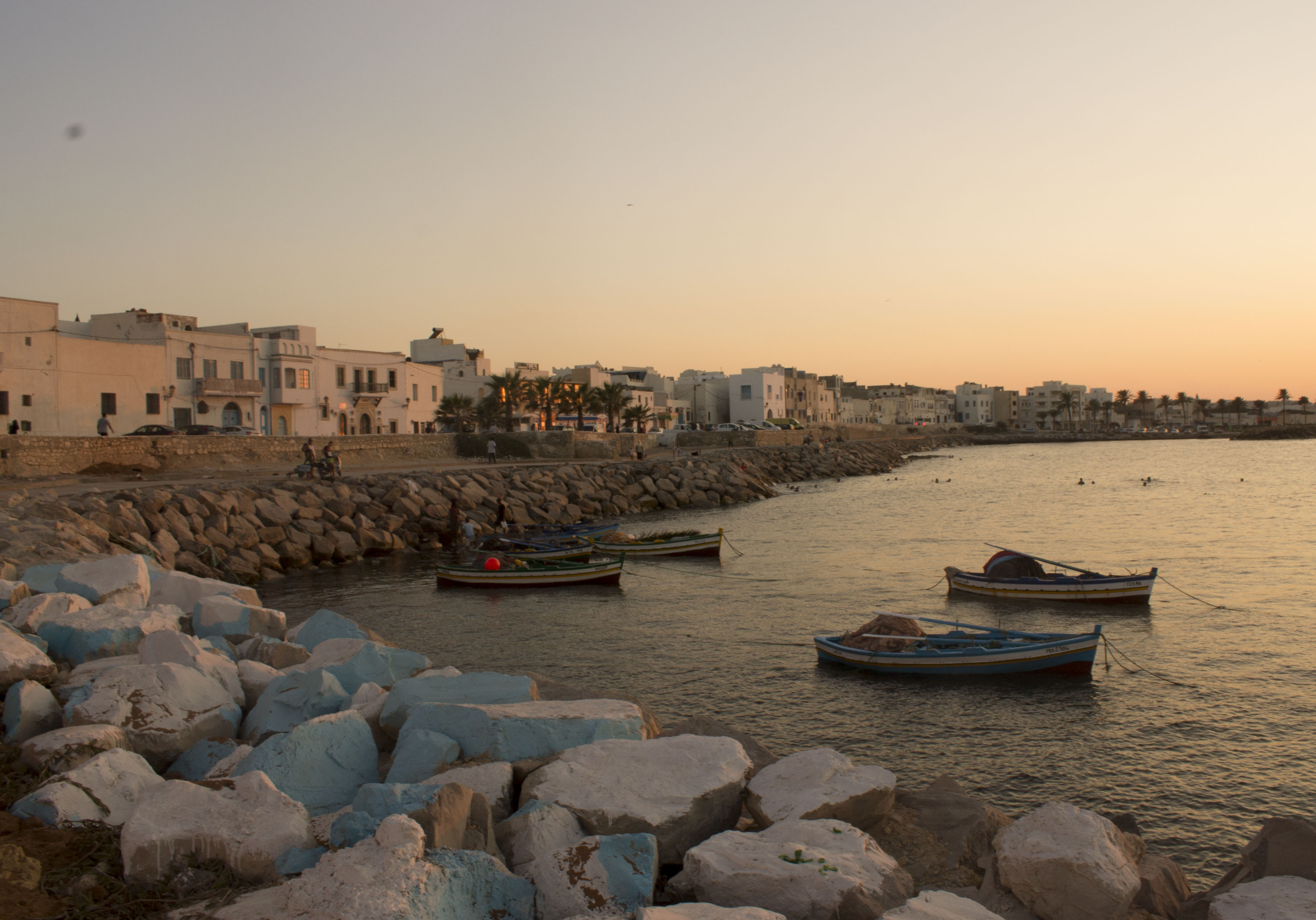
Port of Mahdia.

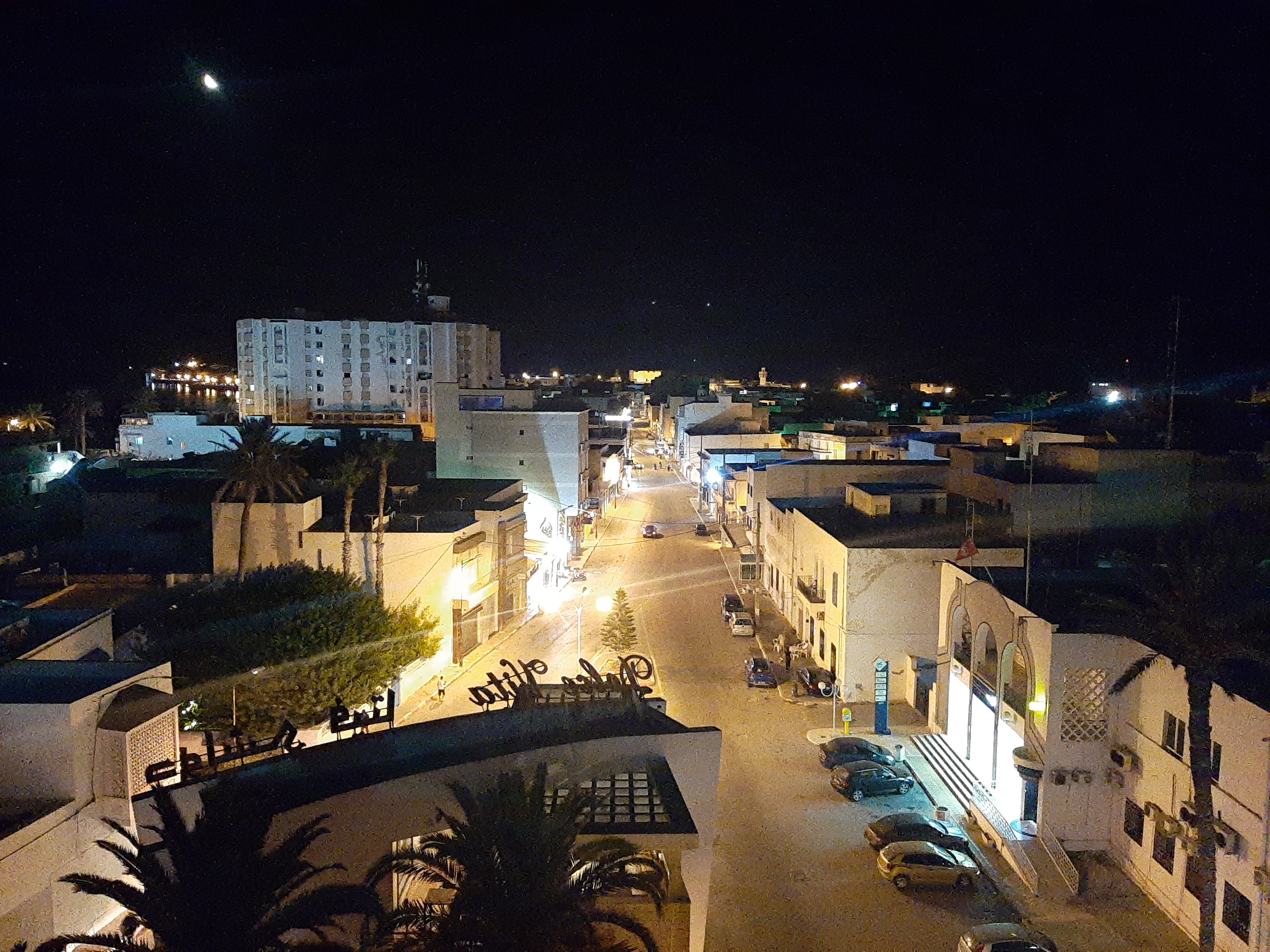
Mahida in night.

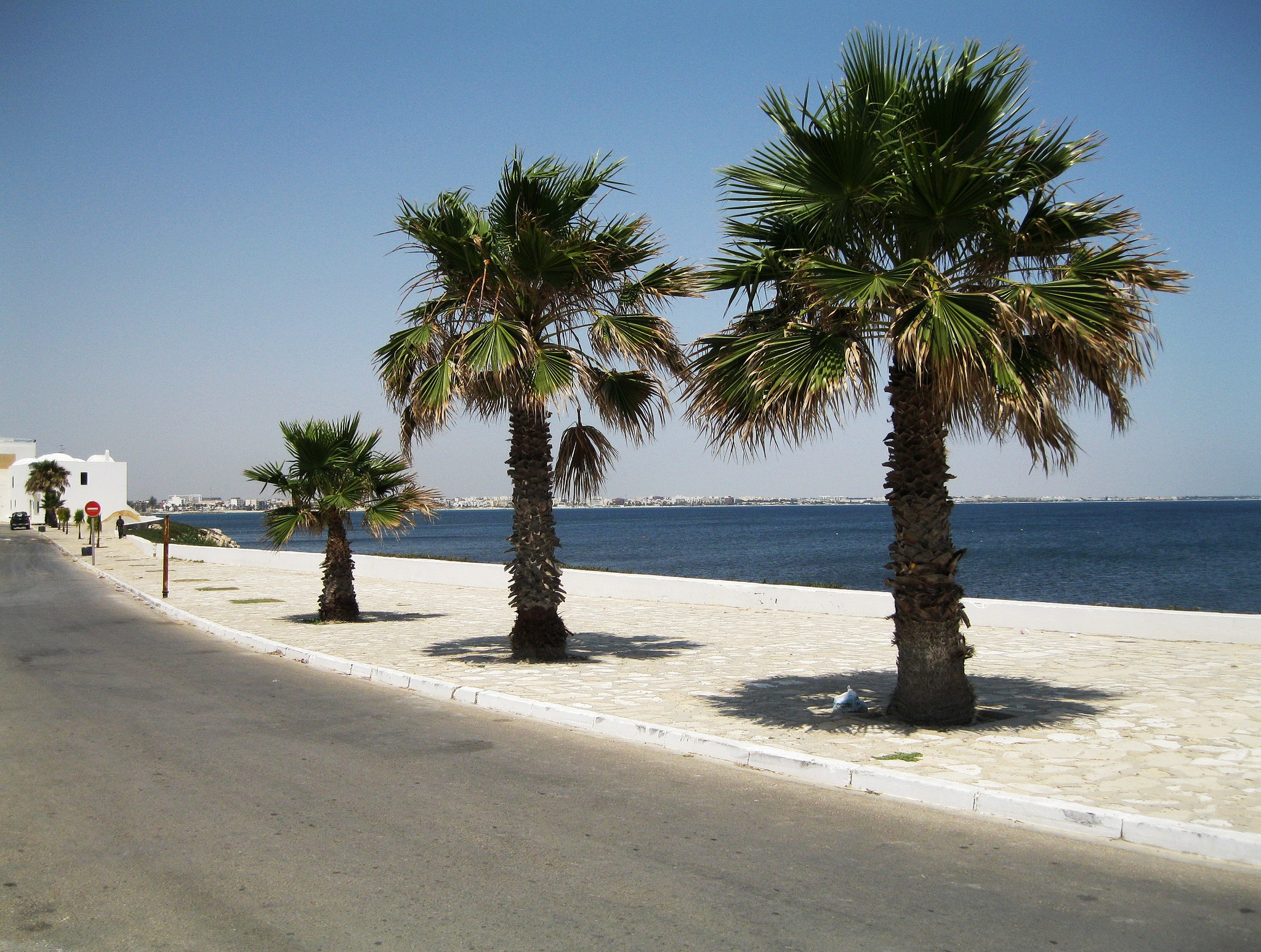
Mahida beach.

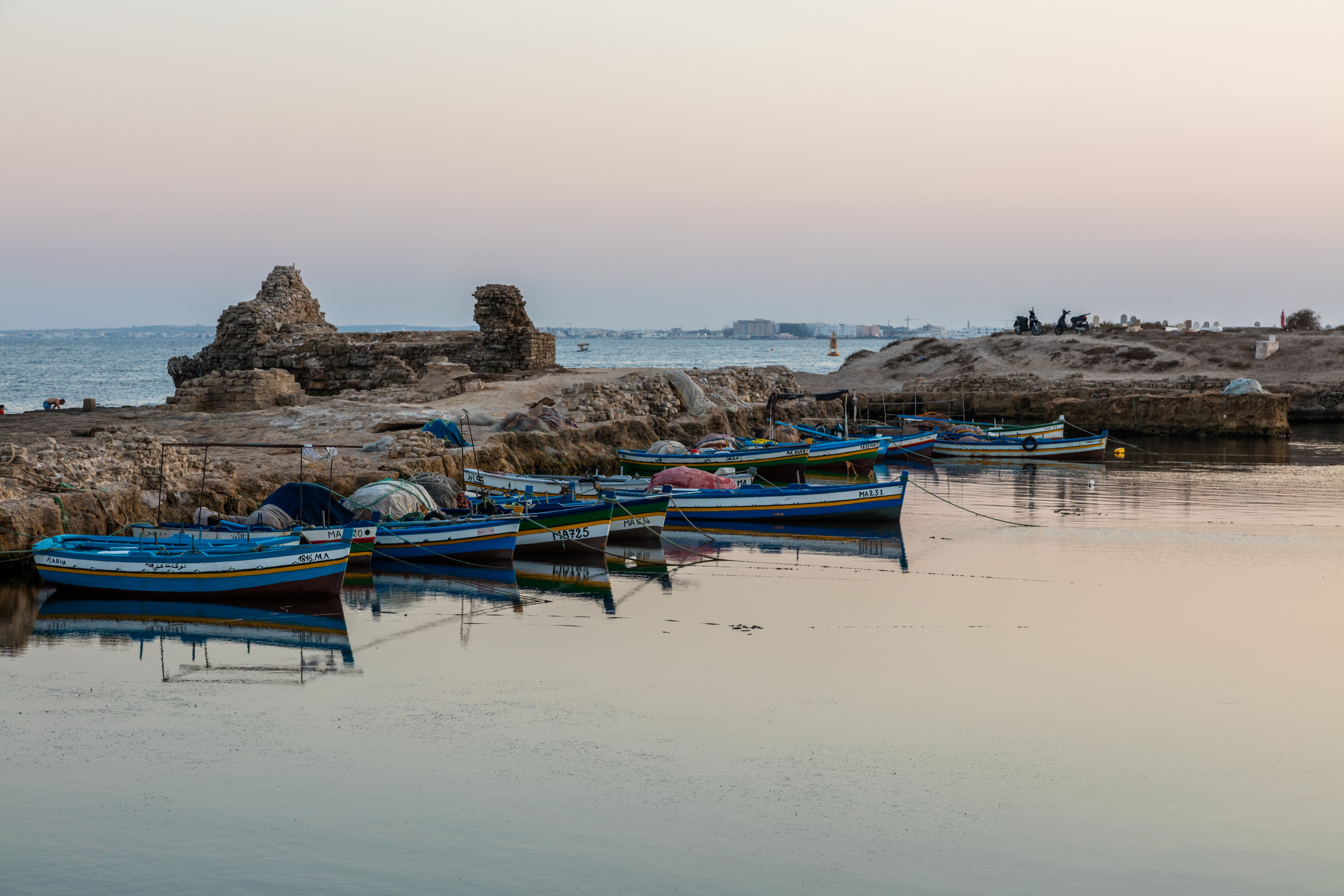
Old port.

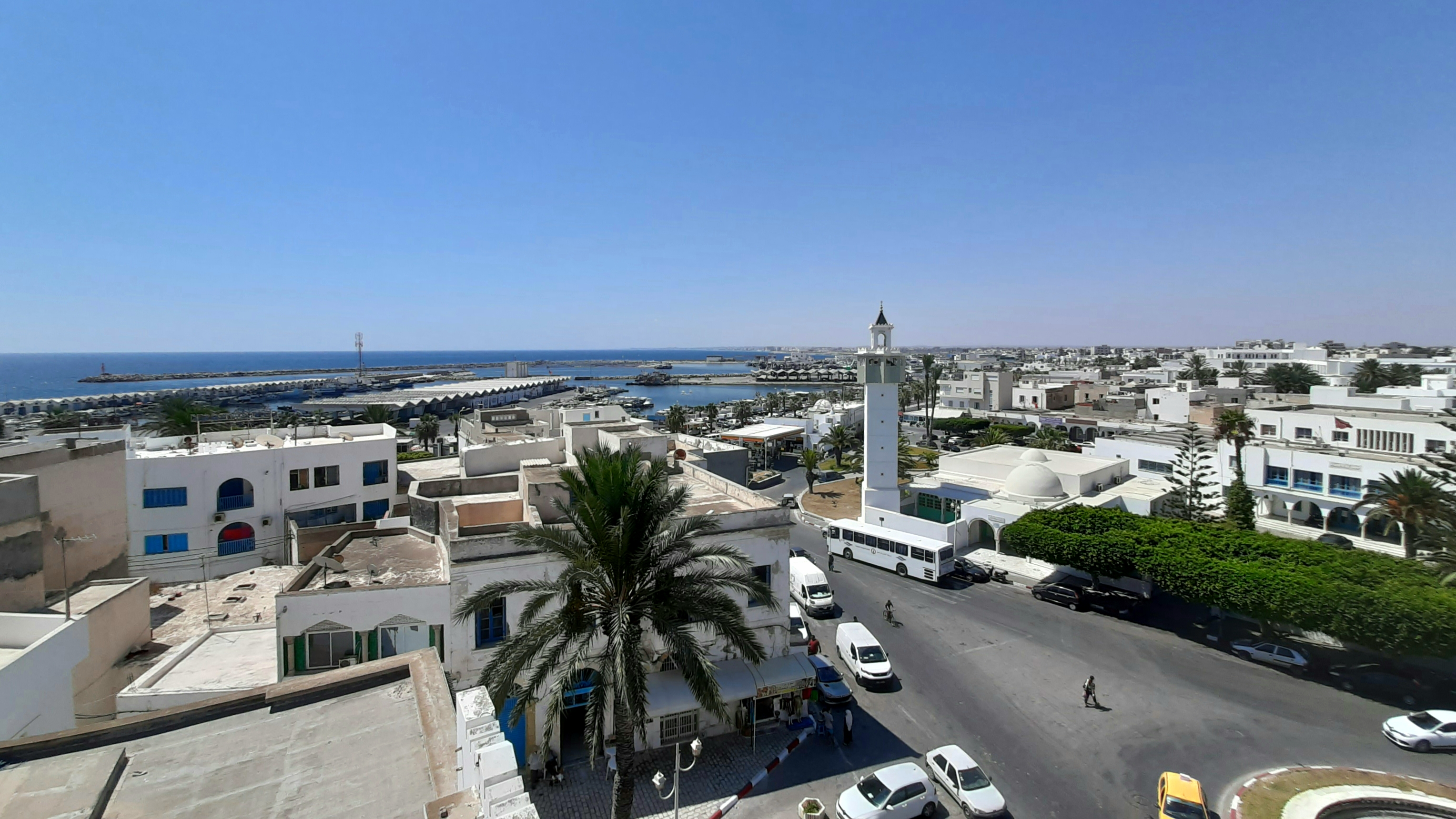
Aerial view of Mahida.

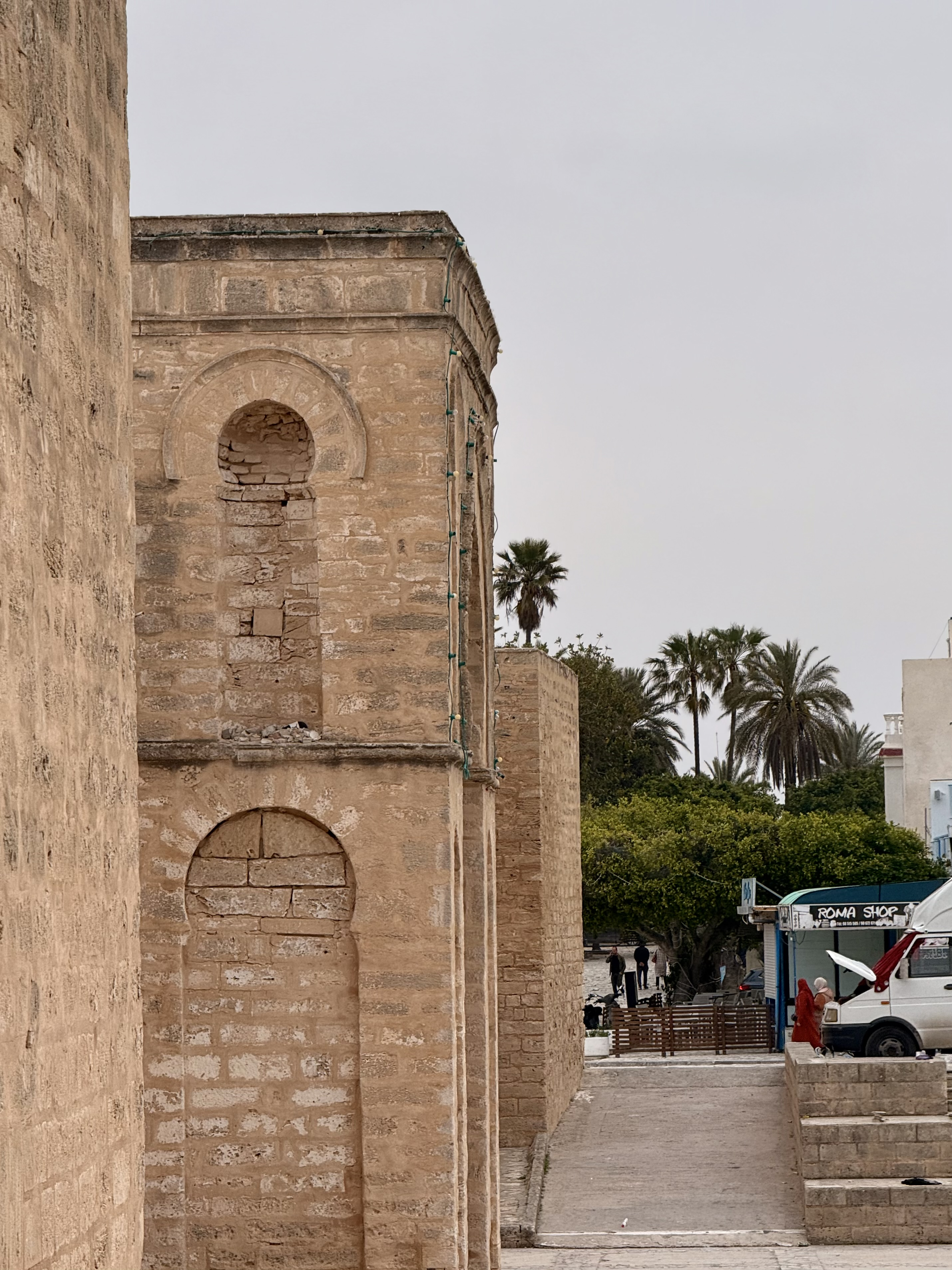
Borj El Kebir Fortess (Kasbah)

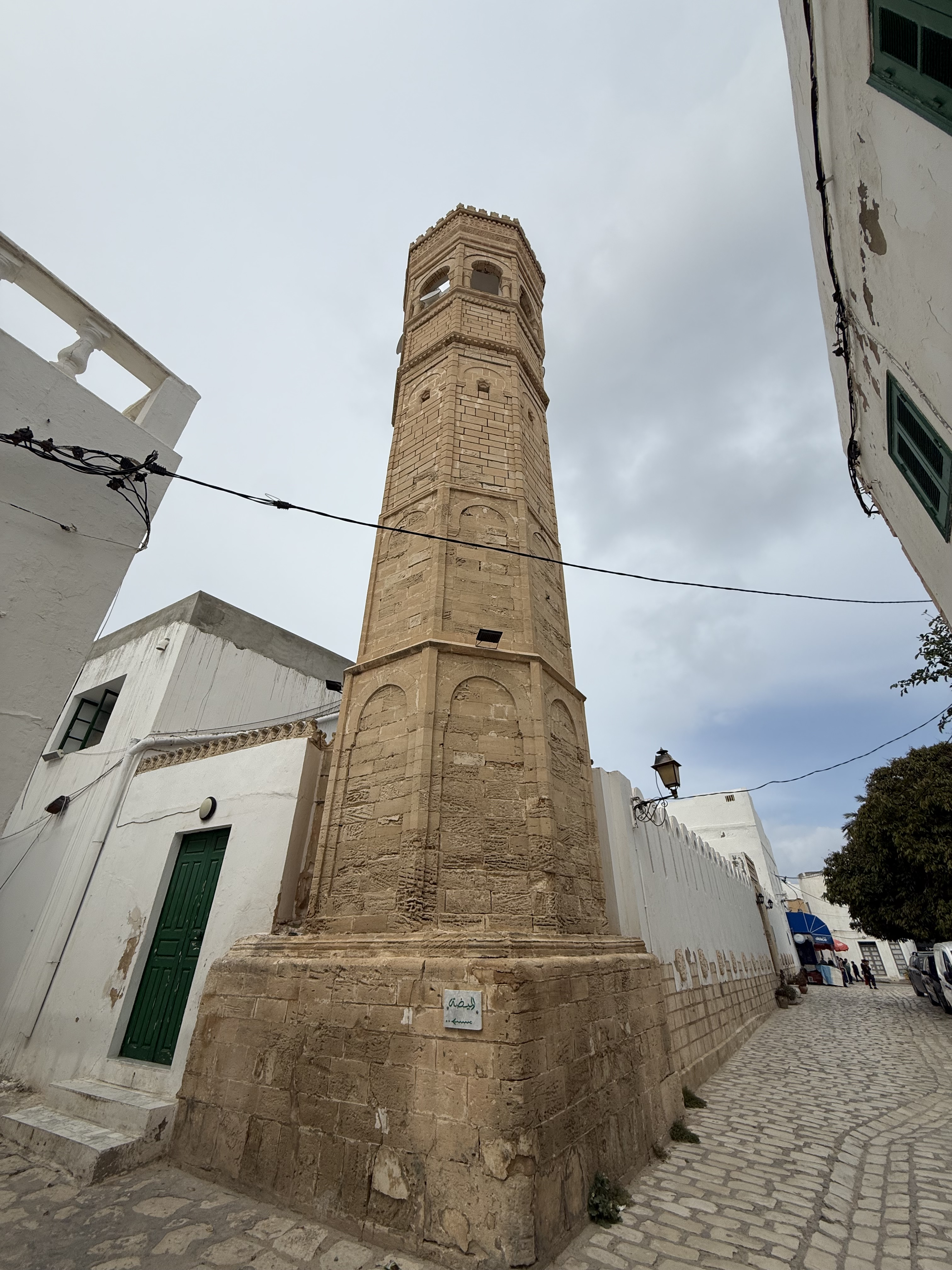
Slimene Hamza Mosque

== See also ==
- European enclaves in North Africa before 1830
- Mahdia shipwreck
- List of cities in Tunisia
