= Basketball at the 2012 Summer Olympics – Men's tournament =

Tournament details
- Host country: United Kingdom
- City: London
- Dates: 29 July – 12 August 2012
- Teams: 12 (from 5 confederations)
- Venues: 2 (in 1 host city)

Final positions
- Champions: United States (14th title)
- Runners-up: Spain
- Third place: Russia
- Fourth place: Argentina

Tournament statistics
- Games played: 38
- Top scorer: (Australia) Patty Mills (21.2 points per game)

The men's basketball tournament at the 2012 Summer Olympics in London, began on 29 July and ended on 12 August, when the United States defeated Spain 107–100 for the gold medal. All preliminary games were held at the Basketball Arena within the Olympic Park, while the knockout matches took place at The O2 Arena (renamed North Greenwich Arena due to the IOC's commercialisation policy).

== Qualification ==
Means of qualification	Date	Venue	Berths	Qualified
Host nation	6 July 2005		1	Great Britain
2010 FIBA World Championship	28 August – 12 September 2010	Turkey	1	United States
2011 FIBA Africa Championship	17–28 August 2011	Madagascar	1	Tunisia
2011 FIBA Americas Championship	30 August – 11 September 2011	Argentina	2	Argentina; Brazil
2011 FIBA Oceania Championship	7–11 September 2011	Australia	1	Australia
2011 FIBA Europe Championship	31 August – 18 September 2011	Lithuania	2	Spain; France
2011 FIBA Asia Championship	15–25 September 2011	China	1	China
2012 FIBA World Olympic Qualifying Tournament	2–8 July 2012	Venezuela	3	Lithuania; Russia; Nigeria

== Competition format ==
Twelve qualified nations were drawn into two groups, each consisting of six teams. Each game result merits a corresponding point:

Result	Points
Win	2
Loss	1
Loss via default*	1
Loss via forfeiture**	0

*The team has fewer than two players available to play on the court at some point during the game.
**A team cannot put forward at least five players at the start of the game, or its own actions prevent play from being resumed.

In case teams are tied on points, the tiebreaking criteria are used, in order of first application:

1. Results of the games involving the tied teams (head-to-head records)
2. Goal average of the games involving the tied teams
3. Goal average of all of the games played
4. Points scored
5. Drawing of lots

The teams with the four best records qualified for the knockout stage, which was a single-elimination tournament. The semifinal winners contested for the gold medal, while the losers played for the bronze medal.

== Preliminary round ==
All times are British Summer Time (UTC+1).

=== Group A ===
Pos	Team	Pld	W	L	PF	PA	PD	Pts	Qualification
1	United States	5	5	0	589	398	+191	10	Quarterfinals
2	France	5	4	1	376	378	−2	9	Quarterfinals
3	Argentina	5	3	2	448	424	+24	8	Quarterfinals
4	Lithuania	5	2	3	395	399	−4	7	Quarterfinals
5	Nigeria	5	1	4	338	456	−118	6	
6	Tunisia	5	0	5	320	411	−91	5	

Source: FIBA archive
Rules for classification: 1) points; 2) head-to-head points; 3) head-to-head goal average; 4) head-to-head number of points scored.

29 July 2012
09:00

Report

Nigeria	60–56	Tunisia
Scoring by quarter: 18–7, 13–8, 14–16, 15–25
Pts: Aminu 15; Rebs: Diogu 10; Asts: Skinn 3		Pts: Rzig 18; Rebs: Ben Romdhane 12; Asts: three players 3

Basketball Arena, London
Referees: Ilija Belošević (SRB), Marcos Benito (BRA), Rabah Noujaim (LIB)

29 July 2012
14:30

Report

United States	98–71	France
Scoring by quarter: 22–21, 30–15, 26–15, 20–20
Pts: Durant 22; Rebs: three players 9 Asts: James 8		Pts: Traoré 12; Rebs: Turiaf 9 Asts: de Colo 3

Basketball Arena, London
Referees: Cristiano Maranho (BRA), Saša Pukl (SLO), Michael Aylen (AUS)

29 July 2012
22:15

Report

Argentina	102–79	Lithuania
Scoring by quarter: 24–23, 27–16, 27–22, 24–18
Pts: Scola 32; Rebs: Ginóbili 10; Asts: Ginóbili, Prigioni 6		Pts: Kleiza 20; Rebs: Kleiza 7 Asts: Kalnietis 5

Basketball Arena, London
Referees: Carl Jungebrand (FIN), Jorge Carrion (PUR), Vaughan Mayberry (AUS)

31 July 2012
14:30

Report

Lithuania	72–53	Nigeria
Scoring by quarter: 14–8, 20–19, 22–13, 16–13
Pts: Songaila 12; Rebs: Kleiza 6 Asts: Jasikevičius 9		Pts: Diogu, Al. Aminu 12; Rebs: Al. Aminu 11; Asts: Al. Aminu 2

Basketball Arena, London
Referees: Cristiano Maranho (BRA), Stephen Seibel (CAN), Vitalis Gode (KEN)

31 July 2012
20:00

Report

France	71–64	Argentina
Scoring by quarter: 19–12, 13–17, 23–24, 16–11
Pts: Parker 17; Rebs: Batum 7 Asts: Parker 5		Pts: Ginóbili 26; Rebs: Scola 8 Asts: Prigioni 8

Basketball Arena, London
Referees: Juan Arteaga (ESP), Marcos Benito (BRA), Luigi Lamonica (ITA)

31 July 2012
22:15

Report

Tunisia	63–110	United States
Scoring by quarter: 15–21, 18–25, 14–39, 16–25
Pts: Ben Romdhane 22; Rebs: Ben Romdhane 11; Asts: Ben Romdhane 4		Pts: Love, Anthony 16; Rebs: Durant 10; Asts: Paul 7

Basketball Arena, London
Referees: Vaughan Mayberry (AUS), Samir Abaakil (MAR), Oļegs Latiševs (LAT)

2 August 2012
09:00

Report

France	82–74	Lithuania
Scoring by quarter: 25–21, 14–22, 20–9, 23–22
Pts: Parker 27; Rebs: Turiaf 10; Asts: Diaw 8		Pts: Kleiza 17; Rebs: Kleiza 7 Asts: Jasikevičius 5

Basketball Arena, London
Referees: Christos Christodoulou (GRE), Ilija Belošević (SRB), Jorge Vázquez (PUR)

2 August 2012
14:30

Report

Argentina	92–69	Tunisia
Scoring by quarter: 14–28, 26–12, 31–16, 21–13
Pts: Ginóbili 24; Rebs: Scola 10; Asts: Campazzo 7		Pts: Mejri 19; Rebs: Mejri 14; Asts: Laghnej 6

Basketball Arena, London
Referees: Guerrino Cerebuch (ITA), Michael Aylen (AUS), Borys Ryschyk (UKR)

2 August 2012
22:15

Report

United States	156–73	Nigeria
Scoring by quarter: 49–25, 29–20, 41–17, 37–11
Pts: Anthony 37; Rebs: Davis, Love 6 Asts: Williams 11		Pts: Diogu 27; Rebs: Diogu 7 Asts: Aminu 4

Basketball Arena, London
Referees: Juan Arteaga (ESP), Robert Lottermoser (GER), Elena Chernova (RUS)

4 August 2012
09:00

Report

Tunisia	69–73	France
Scoring by quarter: 15–20, 12–15, 16–25, 26–13
Pts: Hdidane 20; Rebs: Ben Romdhane 8 Asts: Laghnej, Mejri 3		Pts: Parker 22; Rebs: Batum 8 Asts: Diaw 5

Basketball Arena, London
Referees: Guerrino Cerebuch (ITA), Bill Kennedy (USA), Vaughan Mayberry (AUS)

4 August 2012
14:30

Report

Lithuania	94–99	United States
Scoring by quarter: 25–33, 26–22, 21–23, 22–21
Pts: Kleiza 25; Rebs: Pocius 7 Asts: Jasikevičius, Pocius 6		Pts: James, Anthony 20; Rebs: Love 8 Asts: Paul 6

Basketball Arena, London
Referees: Recep Ankaralı (TUR), Luigi Lamonica (ITA), Marcos Benito (BRA)

4 August 2012
22:15

Report

Nigeria	79–93	Argentina
Scoring by quarter: 19–37, 18–20, 20–19, 22–17
Pts: Diogu 16; Rebs: Diogu 11; Asts: Aminu 5		Pts: Scola 22; Rebs: Nocioni 6 Asts: Ginóbili 8

Basketball Arena, London
Referees: Cristiano Maranho (BRA), Michael Aylen (AUS), Samir Abaakil (MAR)

6 August 2012
11:15

Report

Tunisia	63–76	Lithuania
Scoring by quarter: 18–7, 17–22, 19–21, 9–26
Pts: Rzig 17; Rebs: Mejri 12; Asts: Mejri 3		Pts: Songaila, Jasikevičius 13; Rebs: Kleiza, Valančiūnas 6 Asts: Kalnietis 9

Basketball Arena, London
Referees: Juan Arteaga (ESP), Saša Pukl (SLO), Felicia Grinter (USA)

6 August 2012
14:30

Report

France	79–73	Nigeria
Scoring by quarter: 23–10, 18–20, 15–24, 23–19
Pts: Batum 23; Rebs: Batum, Diaw 6 Asts: Parker 7		Pts: Oguchi 35; Rebs: Diogu, A. Aminu 7 Asts: four players 2

Basketball Arena, London
Referees: Recep Ankaralı (TUR), Michael Aylen (AUS), Rabah Noujaim (LIB)

6 August 2012
22:15

Report

Argentina	97–126	United States
Scoring by quarter: 32–34, 27–26, 17–42, 21–24
Pts: Ginóbili 16; Rebs: Ginóbili 5 Asts: Campazzo 7		Pts: Durant 28; Rebs: Iguodala, Love 9 Asts: Paul 7

Basketball Arena, London
Referees: Christos Christodoulou (GRE), Ilija Belošević (SRB), Stephen Seibel (CAN)

=== Group B ===
Pos	Team	Pld	W	L	PF	PA	PD	Pts	Qualification
1	Russia	5	4	1	400	359	+41	9 (Note: Head-to-head record: Russia 1–0 Brazil)	Quarterfinals
2	Brazil	5	4	1	402	349	+53	9	Quarterfinals
3	Spain	5	3	2	414	394	+20	8 (Note: Head-to-head record: Spain 1–0 Australia)	Quarterfinals
4	Australia	5	3	2	410	373	+37	8	Quarterfinals
5	Great Britain (H)	5	1	4	380	405	−25	6	
6	China	5	0	5	313	439	−126	5	

Source: FIBA archive
Rules for classification: 1) points; 2) head-to-head points; 3) head-to-head goal average; 4) head-to-head number of points scored.
(H) Hosts
Notes:

29 July 2012
11:15

Report

Brazil	75–71	Australia
Scoring by quarter: 19–20, 17–15, 20–14, 19–22
Pts: Barbosa 16; Rebs: three players 7 Asts: Huertas 10		Pts: Mills 20; Rebs: Andersen 8 Asts: Mills, Nielsen 4

Basketball Arena, London
Referees: Guerrino Cerebuch (ITA), Bill Kennedy (USA), Christos Christodoulou (GRE)

29 July 2012
16:45

Report

Spain	97–81	China
Scoring by quarter: 19–17, 34–24, 16–19, 28–21
Pts: P. Gasol 21; Rebs: P. Gasol 11; Asts: M. Gasol 5		Pts: Yi Jianlian 30; Rebs: Yi Jianlian 12; Asts: Chen Jianghua 5

Basketball Arena, London
Referees: Luigi Lamonica (ITA), Felicia Grinter (USA), Fernando Sampietro (ARG)

29 July 2012
20:00

Report

Russia	95–75	Great Britain
Scoring by quarter: 24–19, 25–15, 22–24, 24–17
Pts: Kirilenko 35; Rebs: Shved 6 Asts: Shved 13		Pts: Deng 26; Rebs: Freeland 10; Asts: Deng, Reinking 3

Basketball Arena, London
Referees: Pablo Estévez (ARG), Jorge Vázquez (PUR), Stephen Seibel (CAN)

31 July 2012
09:00

Report

China	54–73	Russia
Scoring by quarter: 12–20, 13–20, 14–21, 15–12
Pts: Yi Jianlian 16; Rebs: Yi Jianlian 7 Asts: Chen Jianghua 4		Pts: Kirilenko 16; Rebs: Khryapa 12; Asts: Shved, Khryapa 6

Basketball Arena, London
Referees: Saša Pukl (SLO), Robert Lottermoser (GER), Bill Kennedy (USA)

31 July 2012
11:15

Report

Australia	70–82	Spain
Scoring by quarter: 19–14, 13–23, 10–26, 28–19
Pts: Ingles 12; Rebs: Andersen 7 Asts: Dellavedova 4		Pts: P. Gasol 20; Rebs: Reyes 12; Asts: three players 3

Basketball Arena, London
Referees: Carl Jungebrand (FIN), Borys Ryschyk (UKR), José Carrion (PUR)

31 July 2012
16:45

Report

Great Britain	62–67	Brazil
Scoring by quarter: 11–4, 16–23, 16–21, 19–19
Pts: Mensah-Bonsu, Reinking 13; Rebs: Mensah-Bonsu 12; Asts: Deng 7		Pts: Splitter 21; Rebs: three players 6 Asts: Huertas 8

Basketball Arena, London
Referees: Recep Ankaralı (TUR), Ilija Belošević (SRB), Fernando Sampietro (ARG)

2 August 2012
11:15

Report

Australia	81–61	China
Scoring by quarter: 21–22, 28–11, 12–19, 20–9
Pts: Mills 20; Rebs: Worthington 8 Asts: Ingles 7		Pts: Wang Shipeng 21; Rebs: Yi Jianlian, Wang Zhizhi 12; Asts: Wang Shipeng 3

Basketball Arena, London
Referees: Recep Ankaralı (TUR), Pablo Estévez (ARG), Stephen Seibel (CAN)

2 August 2012
16:45

Report

Brazil	74–75	Russia
Scoring by quarter: 20–15, 12–25, 21–19, 21–16
Pts: Barbosa 16; Rebs: Nenê 10; Asts: Vinicius 4		Pts: Kirilenko 19; Rebs: Monia, Mozgov 7 Asts: Shved 6

Basketball Arena, London
Referees: José Carrion (PUR), Luigi Lamonica (ITA), Rabah Noujaim (LIB)

2 August 2012
20:00

Report

Spain	79–78	Great Britain
Scoring by quarter: 24–15, 13–14, 24–19, 18–30
Pts: Calderón 19; Rebs: San Emeterio 10; Asts: Fernández 7		Pts: Deng 26; Rebs: Deng 9 Asts: Deng 7

Basketball Arena, London
Referees: Bill Kennedy (USA), Saša Pukl (SLO), Oļegs Latiševs (LAT)

4 August 2012
11:15

Report

Russia	77–74	Spain
Scoring by quarter: 11–28, 21–12, 24–13, 21–21
Pts: Fridzon 24; Rebs: Mozgov 9 Asts: Ponkrashov 11		Pts: P. Gasol 20; Rebs: M. Gasol 9 Asts: Rodríguez, Calderón 3

Basketball Arena, London
Referees: Christos Christodoulou (GRE), Jorge Vázquez (PUR), Fernando Sampietro (ARG)

4 August 2012
16:45

Report

China	59–98	Brazil
Scoring by quarter: 11–25, 10–17, 17–28, 21–28
Pts: Zhu Fangyu 13; Rebs: Yi Jianlian 6 Asts: Chen Jianghua 2		Pts: Vinicius 14; Rebs: Varejão 13; Asts: Taylor 6

Basketball Arena, London
Referees: Carl Jungebrand (FIN), Borys Ryschyk (UKR), Oļegs Latiševs (LAT)

4 August 2012
20:00

Report

Great Britain	75–106	Australia
Scoring by quarter: 25–18, 21–18, 14–30, 15–40
Pts: Freeland 16; Rebs: Freeland 7 Asts: Archibald 4		Pts: Mills 39; Rebs: Newley 8 Asts: Ingles, Newley 4

Basketball Arena, London
Referees: Juan Arteaga (ESP), José Carrion (PUR), Robert Lottermoser (GER)

6 August 2012
09:00

Report

Australia	82–80	Russia
Scoring by quarter: 29–20, 17–25, 23–19, 13–16
Pts: Ingles 20; Rebs: Dellavedova 6 Asts: Dellavedova 7		Pts: Kaun 18; Rebs: three players 6 Asts: Khryapa 8

Basketball Arena, London
Referees: Carl Jungebrand (FIN), Luigi Lamonica (ITA), Samir Abaakil (MAR)

6 August 2012
16:45

Report

Great Britain	90–58	China
Scoring by quarter: 27–15, 19–16, 26–17, 18–10
Pts: Achara 16; Rebs: Archibald 9 Asts: Lawrence 6		Pts: Wang Zhizhi 11; Rebs: Yi Jianlian 14; Asts: Liu Wei 4

Basketball Arena, London
Referees: Cristiano Maranho (BRA), Fernando Sampietro (ARG), Vaughan Mayberry (AUS)

6 August 2012
20:00

Report

Spain	82–88	Brazil
Scoring by quarter: 26–17, 18–21, 22–19, 16–31
Pts: P. Gasol 25; Rebs: P. Gasol 7 Asts: three players 4		Pts: Barbosa 23; Rebs: Varejão 7 Asts: Huertas 6

Basketball Arena, London
Referees: Pablo Estévez (ARG), Jorge Vázquez (PUR), Robert Lottermoser (GER)

== Knockout round ==
Quarterfinals
A1	United States	119
B4	Australia	86
B2	Brazil	77
A3	Argentina	82
B1	Russia	83
A4	Lithuania	74
A2	France	59
B3	Spain	66

Semifinals
A1	United States	109
A3	Argentina	83
B1	Russia	59
B3	Spain	67

Gold medal match
A1	United States	107
B3	Spain	100
Bronze medal match
A3	Argentina	77
B1	Russia	81

=== Quarterfinals ===
8 August 2012
14:00

Report

Russia	83–74	Lithuania
Scoring by quarter: 17–10, 15–17, 22–23, 29–24
Pts: Kirilenko 19; Rebs: Kirilenko 13; Asts: Khryapa 8		Pts: Kaukėnas 19; Rebs: Valančiūnas 9 Asts: four players 3

North Greenwich Arena, London
Referees: Carl Jungebrand (FIN), Pablo Estévez (ARG), Michael Aylen (AUS)

8 August 2012
16:15

Report

France	59–66	Spain
Scoring by quarter: 22–17, 15–17, 16–17, 6–15
Pts: Parker, Diaw 15; Rebs: Diaw 8 Asts: Diaw 5		Pts: M. Gasol 14; Rebs: P. Gasol 11; Asts: P. Gasol, Fernández 3

North Greenwich Arena, London
Referees: Cristiano Maranho (BRA), Bill Kennedy (USA), Christos Christodoulou (GRE)

8 August 2012
20:00

Report

Brazil	77–82	Argentina
Scoring by quarter: 26–23, 14–23, 14–18, 23–18
Pts: Barbosa, Huertas 22; Rebs: Hilário 12; Asts: Huertas 5		Pts: Scola 17; Rebs: Ginóbili 8 Asts: Prigioni 8

North Greenwich Arena, London
Referees: Juan Arteaga (ESP), José Carrion (PUR), Recep Ankaralı (TUR)

8 August 2012
22:15

Report

United States	119–86	Australia
Scoring by quarter: 28–21, 28–21, 28–28, 35–16
Pts: Bryant 20; Rebs: James 14; Asts: James 11		Pts: Mills 26; Rebs: Ingles 8 Asts: Ingles 6

North Greenwich Arena, London
Referees: Luigi Lamonica (ITA), Fernando Sampietro (ARG), Samir Abaakil (MAR)

=== Semifinals ===
10 August 2012
17:00

Report

Spain	67–59	Russia
Scoring by quarter: 9–12, 11–19, 26–15, 21–13
Pts: P. Gasol 16; Rebs: P. Gasol 12; Asts: three players 3		Pts: Kaun 14; Rebs: Kirilenko 8 Asts: Shved 7

North Greenwich Arena, London
Referees: Luigi Lamonica (ITA), Ilija Belošević (SRB), Marcos Benito (BRA)

10 August 2012
21:00

Report

Argentina	83–109	United States
Scoring by quarter: 19–24, 21–23, 17–27, 26–35
Pts: Ginobili 18; Rebs: Delfino 5 Asts: Prigioni 6		Pts: Durant 19; Rebs: Love 9 Asts: James, Paul 7

North Greenwich Arena, London
Referees: Carl Jungebrand (FIN), Recep Ankaralı (TUR), Robert Lottermoser (GER)

=== Bronze medal game ===
12 August 2012
11:00

Report

Argentina	77–81	Russia (bronze)
Scoring by quarter: 20–19, 18–21, 19–21, 20–20
Pts: Ginobili 21; Rebs: Nocioni 7 Asts: Prigioni 7		Pts: Shved 25; Rebs: Kirilenko 8 Asts: Shved 7

North Greenwich Arena, London
Referees: Juan Arteaga (ESP), José Carrion (PUR), Bill Kennedy (USA)

=== Gold medal game ===
12 August 2012
15:00

Report 1
Report 2

(gold) United States	107–100	Spain (silver)
Scoring by quarter: 35–27, 24–31, 24–24, 24–18
Pts: Durant 30; Rebs: Durant, Love 9 Asts: James 4		Pts: P. Gasol 24; Rebs: Ibaka 9 Asts: P. Gasol 7

North Greenwich Arena, London
Referees: Cristiano Maranho (BRA), Christos Christodoulou (GRE), Michael Aylen (AUS)

Team details

United States	Spain

C	4	Tyson Chandler
G	5	Kevin Durant
F	6	LeBron James
G	10	Kobe Bryant (c)
G	13	Chris Paul
G	7	Russell Westbrook
G	8	Deron Williams
C	11	Kevin Love
F	15	Carmelo Anthony
Head Coach:
(United States) Mike Krzyzewski

F	4	Pau Gasol
G	5	Rudy Fernández
G	7	Juan C. Navarro
PG	8	José Calderón
C	13	Marc Gasol
PG	6	Sergio Rodríguez
SG	12	Sergio Llull
PF	14	Serge Ibaka
Head Coach:
(Italy) Sergio Scariolo

== Awards ==
2012 Olympic Basketball Champions

United States
Fourteenth title

== Statistical leaders ==
=== Individual tournament highs ===
Points
Pos.	Name	G	Pts	PPG
1	(Australia) Patty Mills	6	127	21.2
2	(United States) Kevin Durant	8	156	19.5
3	(Argentina) Manu Ginóbili	8	155	19.4
4	(Spain) Pau Gasol	8	153	19.1
5	(Argentina) Luis Scola	8	144	18.0
6	(Russia) Andrei Kirilenko	8	140	17.5
7	(United States) Carmelo Anthony	8	130	16.3
8	(Brazil) Leandro Barbosa	6	97	16.2
9	(United Kingdom) Luol Deng	5	79	15.8
10	(France) Tony Parker	6	94	15.7

Rebounds
Pos.	Name	G	Reb.	RPG
1	(China) Yi Jianlian	5	51	10.2
2	(Tunisia) Salah Mejri	5	50	10.0
3	(Nigeria) Ike Diogu	5	45	9.0
4	(Tunisia) Makrem Ben Romdhane	5	43	8.6
5	(Brazil) Nenê Hilário	5	40	8.0
6	(Spain) Pau Gasol	8	61	7.6
6	(United States) Kevin Love	8	61	7.6
8	(Russia) Andrei Kirilenko	8	60	7.5
9	(United Kingdom) Pops Mensah-Bonsu	4	29	7.2
10	(Brazil) Anderson Varejão	6	42	7.0

Assists
Pos.	Name	G	Ass.	APG
1	(Argentina) Pablo Prigioni	6	39	6.5
2	(Brazil) Marcelinho Huertas	6	36	6.0
3	(Russia) Alexey Shved	8	47	5.9
4	(United States) LeBron James	8	45	5.6
5	(Lithuania) Šarūnas Jasikevičius	6	32	5.3
6	(United States) Chris Paul	8	41	5.1
7	(Lithuania) Mantas Kalnietis	6	29	4.8
8	(United Kingdom) Luol Deng	5	23	4.6
8	(United States) Deron Williams	8	37	4.6
10	(Australia) Matthew Dellavedova	6	27	4.5

Blocks
Pos.	Name	G	Blocks	BPG
1	(Tunisia) Salah Mejri	5	17	3.4
2	(China) Yi Jianlian	5	11	2.2
3	(Russia) Andrei Kirilenko	8	14	1.8
4	(France) Nicolas Batum	6	9	1.5
5	(Spain) Serge Ibaka	8	11	1.3
5	(France) Kevin Seraphin	6	8	1.3
7	(Spain) Pau Gasol	8	9	1.1
8	(Lithuania) Paulius Jankūnas	6	6	1.0
8	(Brazil) Nenê Hilário	5	5	1.0
10	(Russia) Sasha Kaun	8	6	0.8

Steals
Pos.	Name	G	Stls	SPG
1	(United States) Chris Paul	8	20	2.5
2	(Nigeria) Al-Farouq Aminu	5	10	2.0
3	(Russia) Andrei Kirilenko	8	15	1.9
4	(Tunisia) Makrem Ben Romdhane	6	11	1.8
4	(Australia) Matthew Nielsen	5	9	1.8
4	(Argentina) Pablo Prigioni	6	11	1.8
7	(France) Nando de Colo	6	10	1.7
8	(Argentina) Manu Ginóbili	8	13	1.6
8	(United States) Kevin Durant	8	13	1.6
10	(United States) LeBron James	8	11	1.4

Minutes
Pos.	Name	G	Min.	MPG
1	(United Kingdom) Luol Deng	5	173	34.6
2	(Tunisia) Makrem Ben Romdhane	5	169	33.8
3	(China) Yi Jianlian	5	166	33.2
4	(Russia) Andrei Kirilenko	5	165	33
5	(Nigeria) Ike Diogu	5	162	32.4
5	(Australia) Joe Ingles	5	162	32.4
5	(Tunisia) Salah Mejri	5	162	32.4
8	(United Kingdom) Nate Reinking	5	153	30.6
9	(Nigeria) Derrick Obasohan	5	151	30.2
10	(Australia) Patrick Mills	5	149	29.8

=== Individual game highs ===
Department	Name	Total	Opponent
Points	(Australia) Patrick Mills	39	Great Britain
Rebounds	(Tunisia) Salah Mejri (China) Yi Jianlian	14	Argentina; Great Britain
Assists	(Russia) Alexey Shved	13	Great Britain
Steals	(Nigeria) Al-Farouq Aminu (Australia) David Andersen (France) Nando de Colo (Russia) Vitaly Fridzon (Argentina) Manu Ginóbili (Russia) Andrei Kirilenko (United States) Chris Paul (China) Sun Yue	4	Tunisia; Spain; Nigeria; Great Britain; Lithuania; China; Lithuania; Spain
Blocks	(Tunisia) Salah Mejri	7	Argentina
Field goal percentage	(Russia) Timofey Mozgov	88.9% (8/9)	Brazil
3-point field goal percentage	(Argentina) Manu Ginóbili	100% (4/4)	Tunisia
Free throw percentage	(China) Zhu Fangyu	100% (8/8)	Brazil
Turnovers	(Tunisia) Makrem Ben Romdhane (Lithuania) Mantas Kalnietis	7	Nigeria; United States

=== Team tournament highs ===
Offensive PPG
Pos.	Name	PPG
1	United States	115.5
2	Argentina	86.3
3	Australia	82.7
4	Spain	80.9
5	Brazil	79.8

Defensive PPG
Pos.	Name	PPG
1	Brazil	69.8
2	Russia	71.8
3	Australia	74.6
4	France	75.6
5	Spain	78.8

Rebounds
Pos.	Name	RPG
1	United States	44.6
2	Australia	41.3
3	Great Britain	41.0
4	Spain	40.5
5	Nigeria	38.8

Assists
Pos.	Name	APG
1	United States	25.0
2	Russia	19.8
3	Argentina	19.6
4	Spain	19.3
5	Lithuania	18.2

Steals
Pos.	Name	SPG
1	United States	10.4
2	Australia	6.7
3	Brazil	6.5
4	Argentina	6.3
5	France	6.2

Blocks
Pos.	Name	BPG
1	France	5.0
1	Russia	5.0
3	China	4.2
3	Tunisia	4.2
5	Spain	3.9

=== Team game highs ===
Department	Name	Total	Opponent
Points	United States	156	Nigeria
Rebounds	United States; Spain	56	France; Australia
Assists	United States	41	Nigeria
Steals	United States	17	Lithuania
Blocks	Russia	9	Great Britain
Field goal percentage	United States	71.1% (59/83)	Nigeria
3-point field goal percentage	United States	63% (29/46)	Nigeria
Free throw percentage	France	100.0% (10/10)	Tunisia
Turnovers	Nigeria	25	United States

=== ESPN All-Olympics Teams ===
Pos.	First Team	Second Team
G	(Argentina) Manu Ginóbili	(Australia) Patty Mills
G	(United States) LeBron James	(Brazil) Marcelinho Huertas
F	(Russia) Andrei Kirilenko	(Australia) Joe Ingles
F	(United States) Kevin Durant	(United States) Carmelo Anthony
C	(Spain) Pau Gasol	(Argentina) Luis Scola

Honorable Mentions:

(Argentina) Carlos Delfino
(Brazil) Leandro Barbosa
(China) Yi Jianlian
(France) Nicolas Batum
(France) Boris Diaw
(United Kingdom) Joel Freeland
(Russia) Alexey Shved
(Spain) Marc Gasol
(United States) Chris Paul
(United States) Kevin Love

== Final standings ==
Rankings are determined by:

- 1st–4th
  - Results of gold and bronze medal games.
- 5th–8th:
  - Win–loss record in the preliminary round group
  - Standings in the preliminary round group (i.e. Group A's #3 is ranked higher than Group B's #4.)
  - Goal average in the preliminary round group
- 9th–10th and 11th–12th:
  - 5th placers in the preliminary round groups are classified 9th–10th; 6th placers classified *11th–12th
  - Win–loss record in the preliminary round group
  - Goal average in the preliminary round group

Rank	Team	Pld	W	L	PF	PA	PD	Standing	GAvg	New rank
1st place, gold medalist(s)	United States	8	8	0	924	667	+257			1
2nd place, silver medalist(s)	Spain	8	5	3	647	619	+28			2
3rd place, bronze medalist(s)	Russia	8	6	2	623	577	+46			6 (▲5)
4th	Argentina	8	4	4	690	691	−1			3
Eliminated at the quarterfinals
5th	Brazil	6	4	2	479	431	+48	B–2nd	1.152	9 (▲4)
6th	France	6	4	2	435	444	−9	A–2nd	0.995	8 (▲4)
7th	Australia	6	3	3	496	492	+4	B–4th	1.099	10 (▼1)
8th	Lithuania	6	2	4	469	482	−13	A–4th	0.990	5
Preliminary round 5th placers
9th	Great Britain	5	1	4	380	405	−25		0.938	23 (▲20)
10th	Nigeria	5	1	4	338	456	−118		0.741	17 (▲4)
Preliminary round 6th placers
11th	Tunisia	5	0	5	320	411	−91		0.779	22 (▲10)
12th	China	5	0	5	313	439	−126		0.713	11 (▼1)

== See also ==
- Women's Tournament
