= Deron Williams =

American basketball player (born 1984)

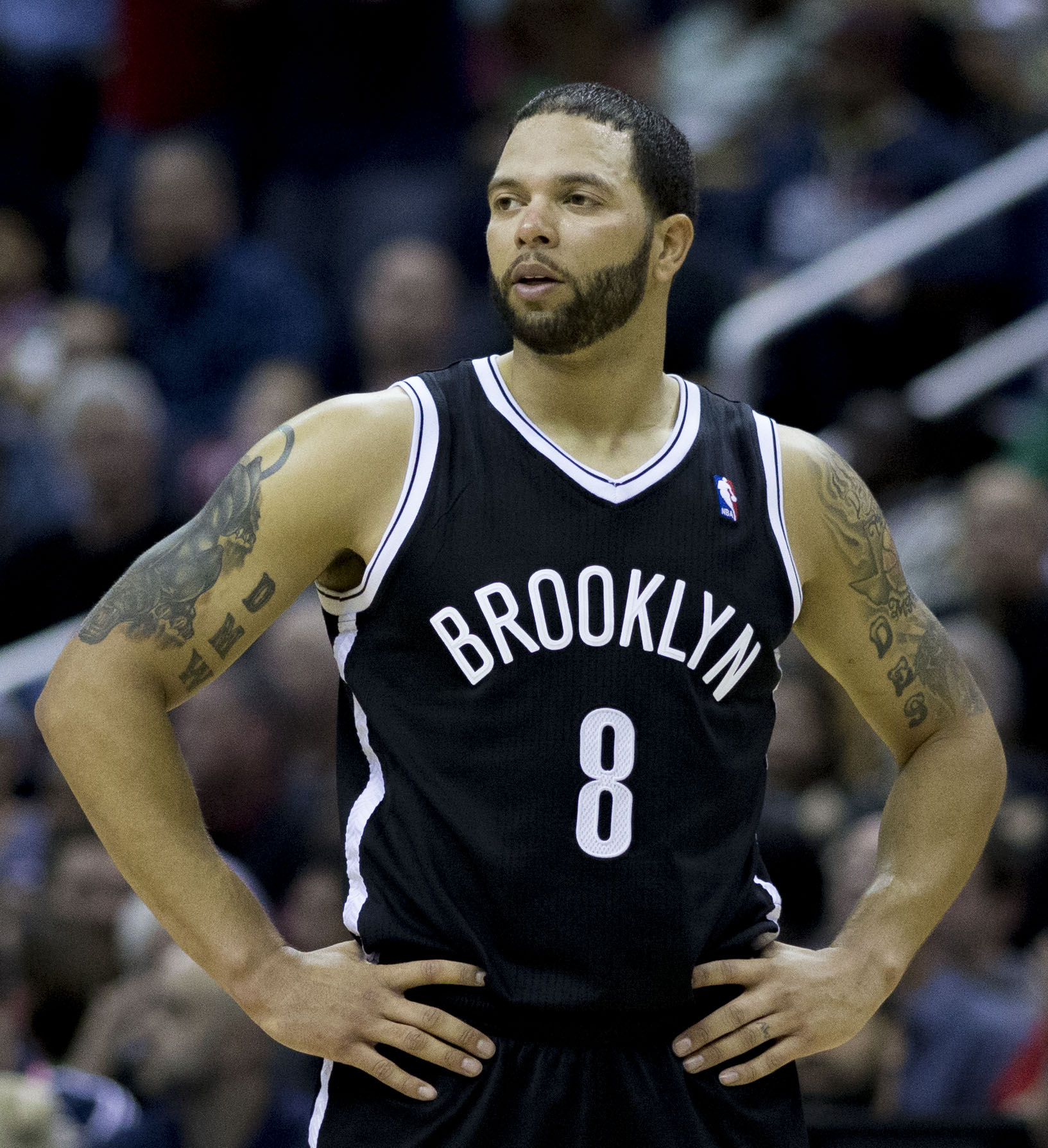
- Williams with the Brooklyn Nets in 2014

Personal information
- Born: June 26, 1984 (age 42) Parkersburg, West Virginia, U.S.
- Listed height: 6 ft 3 in (1.91 m)
- Listed weight: 200 lb (91 kg)

Career information
- High school: The Colony (The Colony, Texas)
- College: Illinois (2002–2005)
- NBA draft: 2005: 1st round, 3rd overall pick
- Drafted by: Utah Jazz
- Playing career: 2005–2017
- Position: Point guard
- Number: 8, 31

Career history
- 2005–2011: Utah Jazz
- 2011–2015: New Jersey / Brooklyn Nets
- 2011: Beşiktaş
- 2015–2017: Dallas Mavericks
- 2017: Cleveland Cavaliers

Career highlights
- 3× NBA All-Star (2010–2012); 2× All-NBA Second Team (2008, 2010); NBA All-Rookie First Team (2006); No. 8 retired by Beşiktaş; Consensus second-team All-American (2005); 2× First-team All-Big Ten (2004, 2005); No. 5 jersey honored by Illinois Fighting Illini

Career NBA statistics
- Points: 13,804 (16.3 ppg)
- Rebounds: 2,619 (3.1 rpg)
- Assists: 6,819 (8.1 apg)
- Stats at NBA.com
- Stats at Basketball Reference
Medals
Men's basketball
Representing the United States
Olympic Games
Gold medal – first place	2008 Beijing	Team
Gold medal – first place	2012 London	Team
FIBA Americas Championship
Gold medal – first place	2007 Las Vegas
FIBA Americas U18 Championship
Bronze medal – third place	2002 Isla Margarita	Team

Deron Michael Williams (/ˈdɛrən/ DERR-ən; born June 26, 1984) is an American former professional basketball player. He played college basketball for the Illinois Fighting Illini before being drafted third overall in the 2005 NBA draft by the Utah Jazz. A three-time NBA All-Star with the Jazz and Brooklyn Nets, Williams also played for Beşiktaş of the Turkish Basketball League during the 2011 NBA lockout, and was a two-time gold medalist for the United States men's national basketball team, participating in the 2008 and 2012 Summer Olympics.

In 2025, Williams was inducted into the Naismith Basketball Hall of Fame as a member of the Redeem Team.

== Early life ==
Williams was born in Parkersburg, West Virginia. In elementary school and middle school, Williams won two state wrestling championships. In 1993, as an eight-year-old, he won the 67 lb. weight class Texas State championship. Four years later in 1997, he won the twelve-year-old 116 lb. weight class championship. Williams attended The Colony High School in The Colony, Texas and averaged 17 points, 9.4 assists, and 2 steals per game as a junior in 2001. That year he led his team, the Cougars, to a 32–2 record and the Class 5A state semifinals against Bryan High. In 2002, as a senior, he averaged 17.6 points, 8.5 assists, 6.1 rebounds, and 2.6 steals per game. His team, the Cougars, went 29–2 that season, losing the 5A Texas State semifinals. Williams was a teammate of Bracey Wright who went on to play for Big Ten rival Indiana University.

College recruiting
Name	Hometown	School	Height	Weight	Commit date
Deron Williams; PG	The Colony, Texas	The Colony (Texas)	6 ft 3 in (1.91 m)	195 lb (88 kg)	Sep 21, 2001
Deron Williams; PG	Recruit ratings: Scout: Rivals:				
Overall recruit ranking: Scout: 12 (PG) Rivals: 8 (PG)
Note: In many cases, Scout, Rivals, 247Sports, On3, and ESPN may conflict in their listings of height and weight.; In these cases, the average was taken. ESPN grades are on a 100-point scale.; Sources: "2002 Illinois Basketball Commitment List". Rivals.; "2002 Illinois Basketball Commitment List". Scout.; "Scout.com Team Recruiting Rankings". Scout.; "2002 Team Ranking". Rivals.

== College career ==
Williams was recruited to play college basketball at the University of Illinois for the 2002–03 NCAA season by Bill Self. In his freshman year, he started 30 of 32 games and ranked third in the Big Ten Conference in assists with 4.53 per game.

Bruce Weber assumed the head coach position for the Illini in April 2003 and helped develop Williams throughout his remaining collegiate career. As a sophomore, Williams improved his scoring average from 6.3 to 14.0 points per game and improved his assists per game from the prior year to 6.17. Williams was a First-Team All-Big Ten selection by both the coaches and media.

In 2005, as a junior starting point guard, Williams led the Fighting Illini to the NCAA championship game where they lost to the University of North Carolina. That season saw the Illini go undefeated until the final game of the regular season when they lost to Ohio State by one point. Illinois's road to the Final Four was marked by a comeback win over the Arizona Wildcats, where the Illini, led by Williams, came back from fifteen points down in the final minutes to win the game. Williams made the game-tying three-point shot with just 38.5 seconds left in regulation. He then hit the go-ahead three-pointer in overtime, and the Illini never looked back in that game.

Williams received many awards after the 2004–05 season. Those honors include being named a consensus Second Team All American, as well as being named First Team All-Big Ten, Big Ten All-Tournament Team, and All-Final Four team and at the conclusion of the academic year, Williams was named as the University of Illinois Athlete of the Year. Williams was also a finalist for the Wooden Award and was named Most Outstanding Player of the Chicago Regional in the NCAA Tournament. Williams was named First-Team All-Big Ten as a sophomore in 2004 and as a junior in 2005, the year in which Williams, called by coach Bruce Weber "the MVP of the team", led the Illini to the Final Four. The team included four other future NBA players, including Dee Brown, Roger Powell, James Augustine, and Luther Head.

Williams declared for the NBA draft after the 2005 season, forgoing his final year of collegiate eligibility.

== Professional career ==
=== Utah Jazz (2005–2011) ===
==== 2005–06 season ====
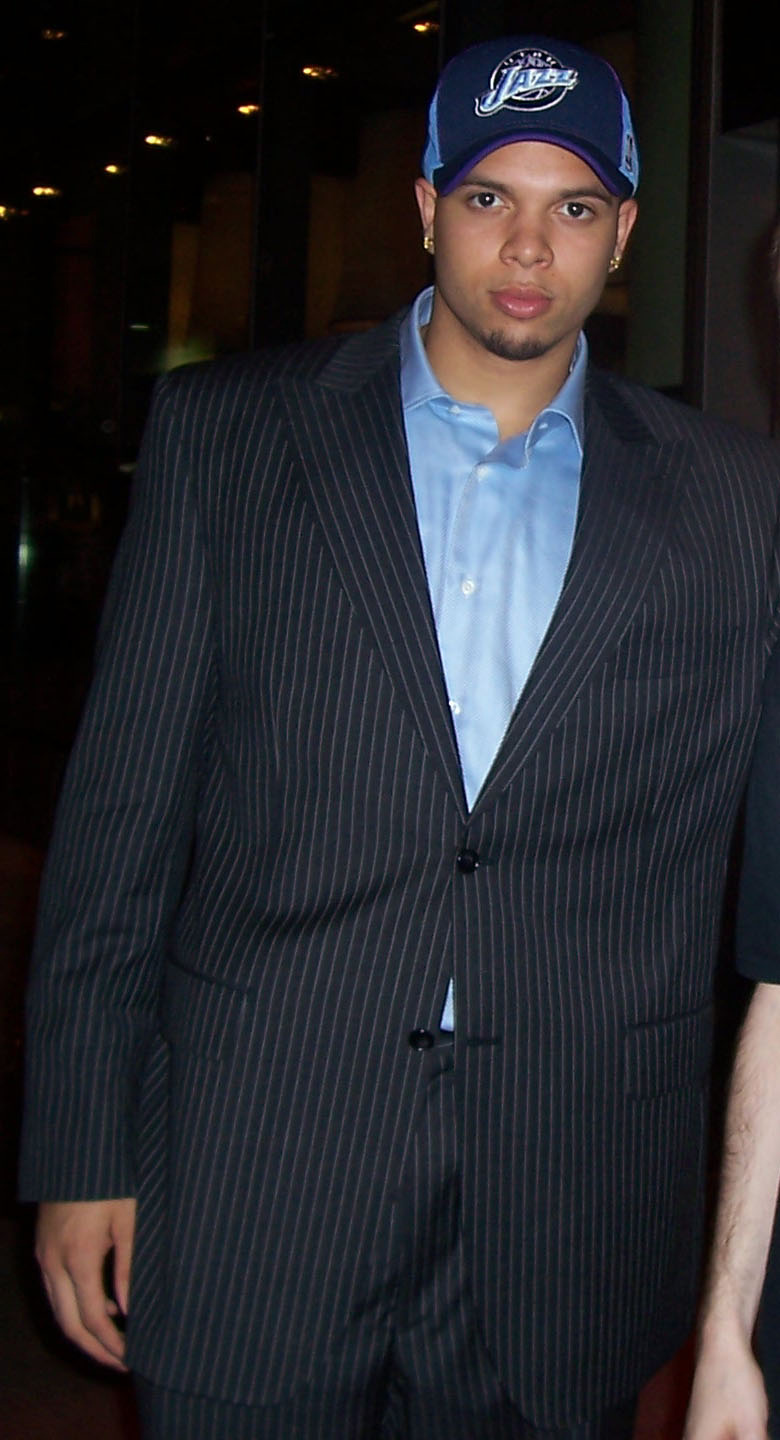
Williams after he was drafted by the Jazz in the 2005 NBA draft

Following the season, Williams declared for the 2005 NBA draft. The Utah Jazz selected Williams with the third overall selection, after Andrew Bogut and Marvin Williams. He started the season coming off the bench, eventually moved into the role of starting point guard, and was later sent back to the bench. Williams finished his rookie season averaging 10.8 points and 4.5 assists per game, in 80 games played. Williams was rewarded by being named to the NBA All-Rookie First Team, as well as being the only other rookie besides Chris Paul to receive a first-place vote in the 2005–06 NBA Rookie of the Year voting (Williams received one first-place vote, from Jazz color commentator Ron Boone). Williams and Chris Paul have shared a friendly rivalry that began after the 2005 NBA draft, where Williams and Paul were the third and fourth selections overall. Whether Williams or Paul was the superior point guard was the subject of frequent debate among sports writers and fans.

==== 2006–07 season ====
Williams began the 2006–07 season as the starting point guard for the Jazz. The Jazz started the season with a 12–1 record. This record was the best in team history and in the league. During these first 13 games of the season, Williams played remarkably well, delivering five double-doubles. Two of these double-doubles were back-to-back performances of 26/14 and 27/15 (points/assists). Both of these assists totals bested his previous career-high. In the second of those two games, he also had a career-high in steals, with five. On January 17, 2007, in a game against the Detroit Pistons, he recorded a career-high 31 points. A few days later, on January 24, he recorded a career-high 21 assists in a game against the Memphis Grizzlies. In his second season, his numbers improved in almost all categories, increasing to 16.2 points and 9.3 assists per game (second only to Steve Nash in the NBA). The Jazz improved to post a 51–31 record, winning the Northwest Division title.

The playoffs ended a three-year playoff drought for the Jazz, and in the first round, they faced the Houston Rockets. Williams scored in double figures in each of the seven games in the series, including a 14 assist, 20 point double-double on May 5 to close out the series. The Jazz won the series 4–3, beating the Rockets in Houston to complete the series. It was their first playoff series victory since 2000.

In the second round, Williams and the Jazz faced the Golden State Warriors, the eighth-seeded team that had upset the top-seeded Dallas Mavericks 4–2 in the first round. Williams started off the series strong, posting double-doubles in two of the first four games as the Jazz jumped out to a 3–1 series lead. In the fifth game, Williams was plagued by foul problems and struggled from the floor, hitting only one of eleven shots from the field and scoring just two points. However, despite Williams's poor performance, the Jazz posted a 100–87 victory, sending the Jazz to the Western Conference Finals for the first time since 1998 and the John Stockton and Karl Malone era.

The Jazz faced the eventual NBA Champion San Antonio Spurs in the conference finals, a team led by Tim Duncan who had posted three NBA championships since 1999. Williams played his best basketball of the season in the first three games, averaging nine assists and over thirty points over that span. Spurs guard Tony Parker recognized Williams's effort after the Jazz won game three 109–83.

He played good tonight. He was very aggressive from the beginning of the game. His outside shot was going and he was aggressive in getting everyone involved.

Spurs forward Bruce Bowen also highlighted Williams's skills, as he compared Williams to the previous Jazz All-Star guard John Stockton.

That's what's missing today in the NBA is solid point guards. You have the scoring guards, you have guards that can't do some things. With him, it's special because he spent that time in college and learned more and more about the game of basketball. So he goes to a team that really needs a great point guard and he just fits the mold of a young Stockton.

==== 2007–08 season ====
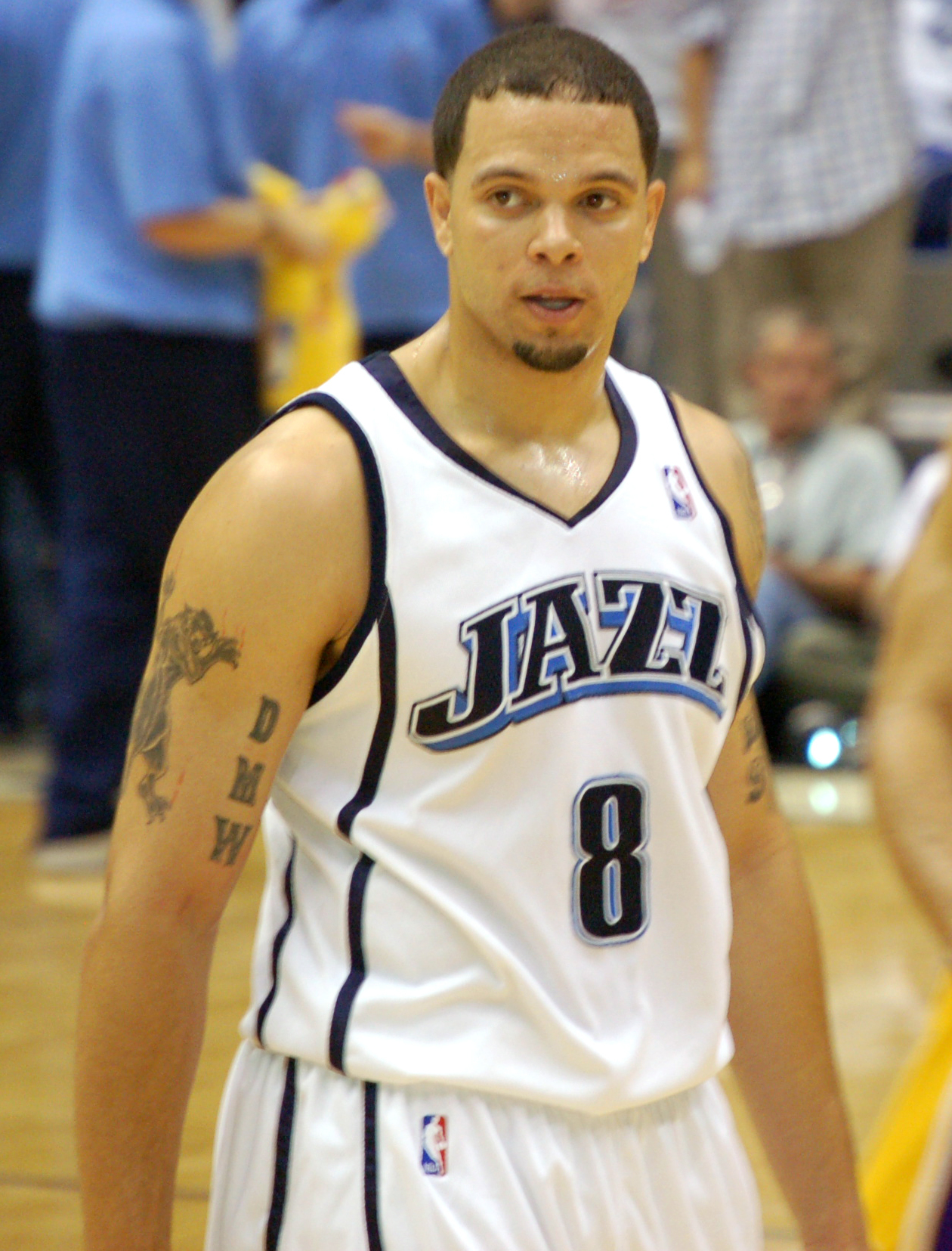
Williams with Utah Jazz in 2008

Williams scored a then-career high 41 points on December 8, 2007, in a game against the Dallas Mavericks, although they ended up losing the game. He also had two 20-assist games on the season. He elevated all of his stats, improving to 18.8 points and 10.5 assists per game, third in the league behind Chris Paul and Steve Nash. Despite his strong performance during the season, he was not selected to represent the Western Conference in the NBA All-Star Game, as the point guard position was filled by Allen Iverson, Steve Nash, and Chris Paul. He did win the NBA Skills Challenge over All-Star weekend.

Much was made of Williams's new leadership role on the team, and how he calls the majority of the plays on the team instead of coach Jerry Sloan, something not even John Stockton did. In March, Williams recorded 212 assists, the most by any NBA player in any month since John Stockton in January 1992. The Jazz again won the Northwest Division and the four seed, this time with a 54–28 record, and again faced a Houston Rockets team that had home-court advantage in the first round. However, the Jazz won the first two games in Houston and went on to win the series in six games. In the second round, the Jazz lost to the Los Angeles Lakers in six games. Williams was the leading scorer for the Jazz in the 2008 playoffs.

==== 2008–09 season ====
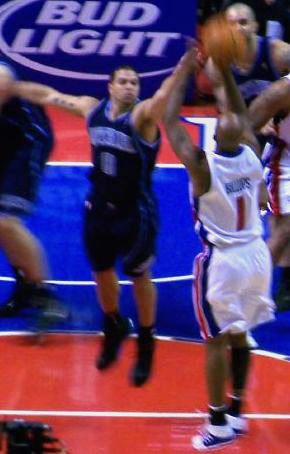
Williams with the Jazz attempting to block Chauncey Billups

During the 2008 offseason, Williams signed a three-year, $50 million extension with a player option for a fourth year. Williams missed thirteen of the first fifteen games of the season due to a second-degree ankle sprain sustained in the preseason against the Chicago Bulls. He returned November 26 against the Memphis Grizzlies. Since that time, he has led the team through an up-and-down season plagued by injuries to several key players (most notably Carlos Boozer and Andrei Kirilenko), but despite averaging 19.2 ppg and 10.0 apg through the All-Star Break, he was again snubbed from the All-Star Game. Similar to the previous year, he responded to the snub with strong play, scoring 30+ points in five consecutive games before the break (he missed one additional game during this time due to a minor injury) and leading the team to a 5–2 record to close out the first half of the season, including a win over the league-leading Los Angeles Lakers to snap their seven-game winning streak. They followed the All-Star Break with a win against the defending champion Boston Celtics.

On March 1, 2009, Williams became the second active player after Steve Nash to reach 20 or more assists in at least four games in their career.

==== 2009–10 season ====
On December 14, 2009, Williams was named the Western Conference Player of the Week. A week after his teammate and pick and roll partner Carlos Boozer, was named The Western Conference Player of the Week. The Jazz hadn't had consecutive Western Conference Player of the Week Awards since 1997, when Karl Malone won it back to back.

On January 28, 2010, Williams was named to participate in the 2010 NBA All-Star Game at Cowboy Stadium in Arlington, Texas. This marked his All-Star debut. He was also invited to participate in the NBA Skills Challenge, where he finished second to Steve Nash.

Playing without starters Andrei Kirilenko and Mehmet Okur, and despite injuries to his wrist and ankle, Williams became the second player in Utah Jazz history to record at least 30 points and 10 or more assists in a playoff game. John Stockton is the only other Jazz player to accomplish said feat, doing so twice in his career. Williams scored 33 points on 7–14 shooting from the field while making 16–18 free throws from the line, while also contributing 14 assists on the road in a game 2 win against the Denver Nuggets. He repeated that feat later in series while scoring 34 points and dishing out 10 assists.

On April 28, Williams became the first player in NBA history to record at least 20 points and 10 or more assists in five straight games in a playoff series. Williams points/assists through the first five games, in order, were 26/11, 33/14, 24/10, 24/13, and 34/10.

==== 2010–11 season ====
After Sloan resigned mid-season on February 7, 2011, he denied reports that conflicts with Williams forced him to leave. "I forced myself out", Sloan responded. Williams acknowledged he had a disagreement with Sloan during the previous night's game, but he added, "I would never force coach Sloan out of Utah. He's meant more to this town, more to this organization than I have by far. I would have asked out of Utah first."

=== New Jersey Nets (2011) ===
On February 23, 2011, Williams was traded to the New Jersey Nets for guard Devin Harris, forward Derrick Favors, two first round draft picks, and $3 million in cash. While Williams was under contract through 2011–12 with a player option worth $17.7 million for 2012–13, Jazz chief executive officer Greg Miller did not believe the team could re-sign Williams. "And while I never saw any indication that he wouldn't re-sign with us, I never saw any indication he would", said Miller.

Williams's acquisition gave the Nets a proven NBA star to build around as the team was preparing to make the transition to their new home in Brooklyn. Williams's impact on the Nets was immediately apparent, although he played in just 12 games due to a nagging wrist injury. As a team, the Nets were one of highest scoring teams post all-star break and big men Brook Lopez and Kris Humphries both saw their scoring numbers increase as Williams averaged 12.8 APG during those 12 games. His 47 assists were an NBA record for a player in his first 3 games with a new team and no Net before him recorded double-doubles in their first 5 games with the team. On April 11, 2011, Williams had wrist surgery on his right wrist which ended his season, although he was initially hesitant to having it. "I was angry and tried to tell the doctors that I didn't want to have the surgery", Williams said. "The two doctors had me outvoted, two against one. I couldn't do anything about it. They told me that there was no reason to postpone it and if I didn't have it, I would be dealing with the same pain again."

=== Beşiktaş (2011) ===
During the 2011 NBA lockout, Williams signed a one-year contract for $5 million net income to play for Beşiktaş of the Turkish Basketball League and the FIBA EuroChallenge. His contract allowed him to return to the NBA with the Nets once the work stoppage ended. Beşiktaş was the same team that signed Allen Iverson in 2010. Because Williams was still under an NBA contract, he required clearance from FIBA in order to play elsewhere.

On November 22, 2011, Williams scored 50 points against Göttingen, during a EuroChallenge first group-stage game. In the game, Williams went 17–23 from the field and 7–10 on three-point attempts and 9–11 on free throws. After a tentative agreement to end the 2011 NBA lockout was reached, Williams's jersey #8 was retired by Beşiktaş in a farewell ceremony prior to a game against Zorg en Zekerheid Leiden on November 29, 2011. Williams played a total of 15 games in Turkey.

=== Return to New Jersey / Brooklyn (2011–2015) ===
==== 2011–12 season ====
After the lockout ended, Williams returned to New Jersey, hoping to lead the Nets to the playoffs for the first time since 2007. The Nets caught a bad break in the preseason, though, as Brook Lopez suffered a broken foot that caused him to miss more than 2 months. After winning their opening game at Washington, the Nets went on to lose their next six, putting them in an early hole in the standings in an abbreviated season. The Nets continued to struggle without Lopez, but Williams played well enough to be voted into the All-Star Game for the third time in his career, as he averaged over 22 points and 8 assists at the break.

When Lopez returned after the All-Star break, the Nets began to pick up their play. On March 4, 2012, Williams scored a career-high and NBA Nets franchise-high 57 points against the Charlotte Bobcats. He broke the previous team record of 52 points held by Mike Newlin and Ray Williams. It was the most points scored in the NBA that season and the second-most points scored against the Bobcats by one player in a single game, second to Kobe Bryant. Lopez went down again with a sprained ankle and was out for several more weeks.

Williams remained optimistic that he would resign with the Nets, but was noncommittal as he said he wanted to keep his options open and become a free agent at the end of the season. Williams reiterated this stance on March 16 after the Nets failed to land All-Star center Dwight Howard at the trade deadline.

==== 2012–13 season ====
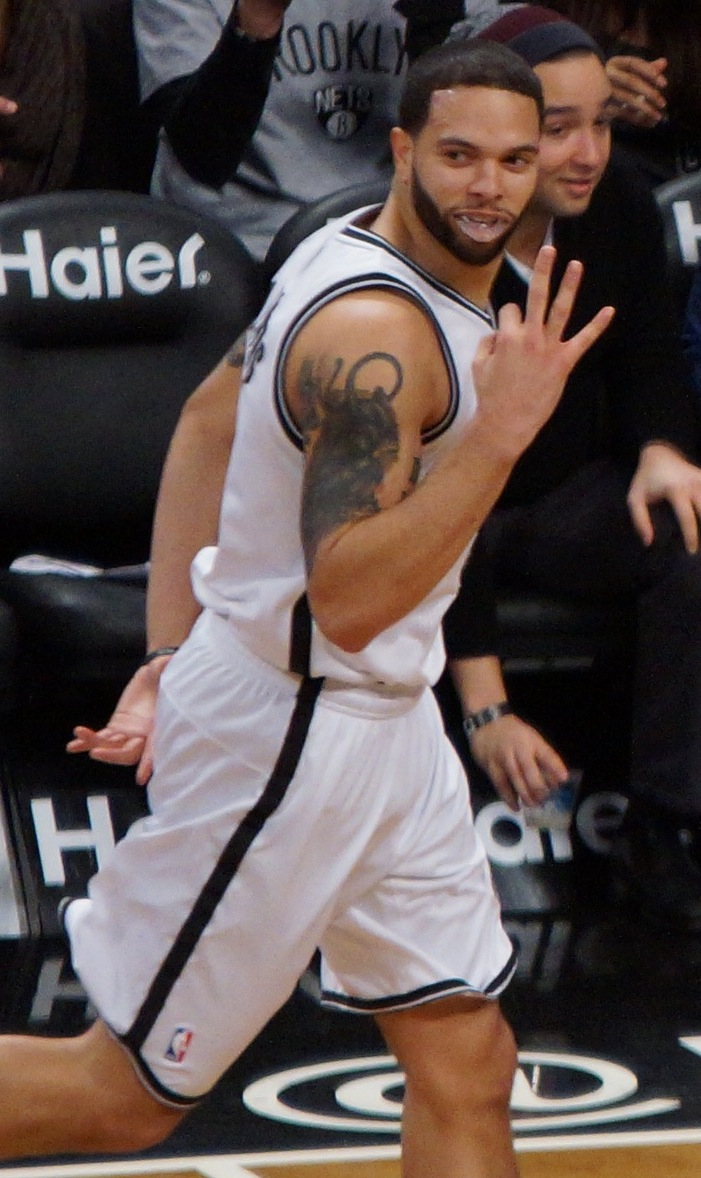
Williams celebrates a made three-pointer

On July 11, 2012, Williams signed a five-year, $98.7 million deal to remain with the Nets, who had completed their move to Brooklyn. He was encouraged to stay with the Nets after GM Billy King completed a trade with the Atlanta Hawks for six-time All-Star Joe Johnson, as well as re-signing young big man Brook Lopez and defensive player Gerald Wallace. Williams scored the first regular-season points at the new Barclays Center on November 3, 2012, against the Toronto Raptors. The Nets won the game 107–100 as Williams finished the game with 19 points and 9 assists. On November 26, 2012, the Nets played their crosstown rival, the New York Knicks, at the Barclays Center. The game was scheduled to be played on November 1, 2012, and be the first game of the season for the Knicks and the Nets. The game was postponed due to weather in the New York City area involving Hurricane Sandy. The Nets beat the Knicks 96–89 in overtime, with Williams contributing 16 points and 14 assists. On December 27, 2012, the Nets fired head coach Avery Johnson after a 14 win, 14 loss start. Rumors circulated that Williams might have been involved in the firing, but Williams denied playing a role and said he was surprised Johnson was fired.

Williams announced that he would miss the final two games before the All-Star break to receive a cortisone shot in both of his ankles and platelet-rich plasma treatment in his ankles. His problems stemmed from a bone spur that was causing inflammation in the ankle.

On March 8, 2013, the Nets were playing the Washington Wizards as Williams hit 11 three-pointers in a single game, setting a Nets record. He hit 9 of the 11 threes in the first half, which was an NBA record for three-pointers in a half. Williams finished the night with 42 points in a Nets win.

==== 2013–14 season ====
On March 28, 2014, Williams recorded his 21st consecutive game with at least one steal, tying the Hawks' Paul Millsap with the longest such streak in the league in 2013–14. Two days later, Williams recorded a steal for the 22nd straight game, marking the longest streak in the 2013–14 season. On April 4, 2014, Williams recorded his 25th straight game with at least one steal, one short of the Nets' franchise record held by Jason Kidd and Mookie Blaylock. The next day, he tied the Nets' franchise record with a steal against the 76ers. He broke the record the next game with two steals against the Miami Heat on April 8. The streak ended at 31 on April 22 after he failed to record a steal in Game 2 of their first-round playoff matchup against the Toronto Raptors.

==== 2014–15 season ====
After leading the Nets to a 4–2 record to start the 2014–15 season, Williams was named Eastern Conference Player of the Week for games played Monday, November 3 through Sunday, November 9. The award marked his first Player of the Week honor as a Net, having previously won the award three times during his tenure with the Jazz, and his first since the week of November 8–14, 2010. Despite a good start to the season injury-wise for Williams, he went down on December 19 in the 91–95 loss to the Cleveland Cavaliers, limping off the court in the second quarter with a strained right calf and did not return. He subsequently missed the following two games, only to return on December 26 against Boston coming off the bench for the first time this season, losing his starting spot in favor of Jarrett Jack. He was later ruled out indefinitely on January 8 with a fractured rib that he suffered on January 4 against Miami. After an 11-game absence due to the injury, Williams returned to action on February 2 against the Los Angeles Clippers, recording 15 points and 3 assists off the bench in the 102–100 win.

On February 20 against the Los Angeles Lakers, Williams regained his starting spot from Jack after 13 straight games coming off the bench. He subsequently recorded 12 points and a season-high 15 assists in the 114–105 win. On April 3, 2015, he scored a season-high 31 points in a 114–109 win over the Toronto Raptors.

In Game 4 of the Nets' first-round playoff series against the Atlanta Hawks on April 27, Williams scored a playoff career-high 35 points in a 120–115 overtime win to tie the series at 2–2. The Nets went on to lose the series in six games.

On July 11, 2015, Williams was waived by the Nets. He received a buyout from the final two seasons of his contract with the Nets.

=== Dallas Mavericks (2015–2017) ===
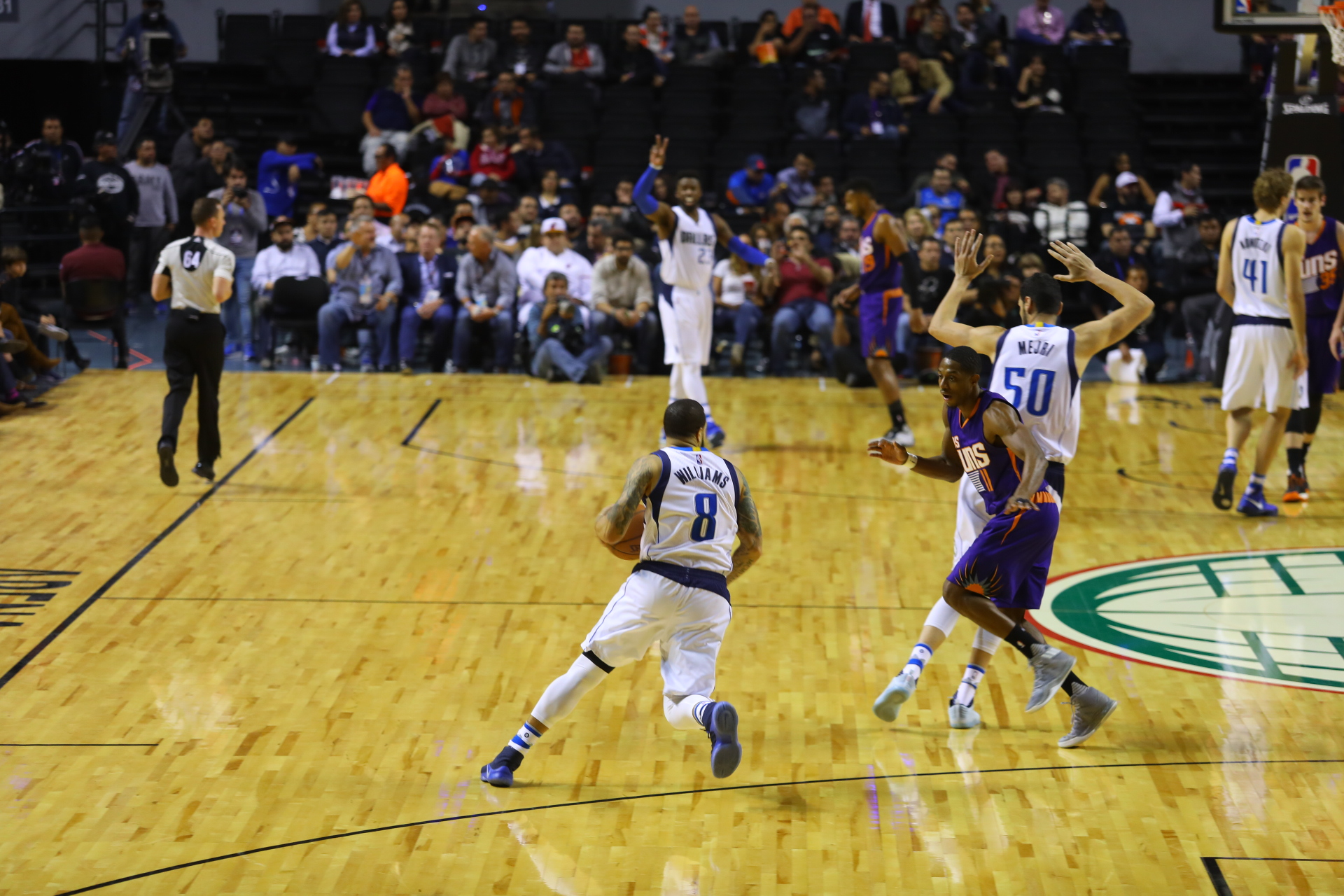
Williams brings the ball up in a 2017 game against the Phoenix Suns

On July 14, 2015, Williams signed a two-year, $11 million contract with the Dallas Mavericks with the second year being a player option. He made his debut for the Mavericks in the team's season opener against the Phoenix Suns on October 28, recording 12 points and 7 assists in a 111–95 win. On December 1, he scored a then season-high 30 points in a 115–112 overtime win over the Portland Trail Blazers. He missed the team's last four games of December with a left hamstring, returning to action on January 1 against the Miami Heat. He played in 20 minutes off the bench against the Heat, finishing with nine points and five assists. On January 5, he scored 25 points and hit the game-winning three-pointer in double overtime against the Sacramento Kings. On March 20, he recorded season highs of 31 points and 16 assists in a 132–120 overtime win over the Portland Trail Blazers, becoming the first Maverick with 30 points and 15 assists in the same game since Jason Kidd did so in 1996. Between late March and early April, Williams missed eight games with a left abdominal strain. The abdominal strain resurfaced for Williams in Game 4 of the Mavericks' first-round playoff series against the Oklahoma City Thunder, ruling him out for the rest of the game after just 89 seconds and later ruled him out for the rest of the season. On July 8, 2016, Williams re-signed with the Mavericks on a one-year, $10 million contract. In the Mavericks' season opener on October 26, 2016, Williams scored a team-high 25 points in a 130–121 overtime loss to the Indiana Pacers. On December 3, he had a season-high 15 assists in a 107–82 win over the Chicago Bulls. Two days later, he had his first double-double of the season with 15 points and 13 assists in a 109–101 loss to the Charlotte Hornets. With seven assists on December 18 against the Sacramento Kings, Williams passed Derek Harper for 21st place on the NBA's all-time assists list with 6,584. On January 22, 2017, he had eight assists against the Los Angeles Lakers and moved into 20th place in NBA history with 6,715 assists, passing Kevin Johnson. On February 11, 2017, against Orlando, Williams returned after missing eight games with a sprained right big toe, getting seven points and four assists in 16 minutes in the first half before sitting out the second half on a minutes restriction. On February 23, 2017, Williams was waived by the Mavericks.

=== Cleveland Cavaliers (2017) ===
On February 27, 2017, Williams signed with the Cleveland Cavaliers. In his debut for the Cavaliers two days later, Williams scored four points in 24 minutes off the bench in a 103–99 loss to the Boston Celtics. On April 10, 2017, he had a season-high 35 points, nine assists and seven rebounds in a 124–121 overtime loss to the Miami Heat.

Williams appeared in all 18 playoff games for Cleveland as the backup point guard to Kyrie Irving, en route to the NBA Finals, where they were defeated by the Golden State Warriors.

== National team career ==
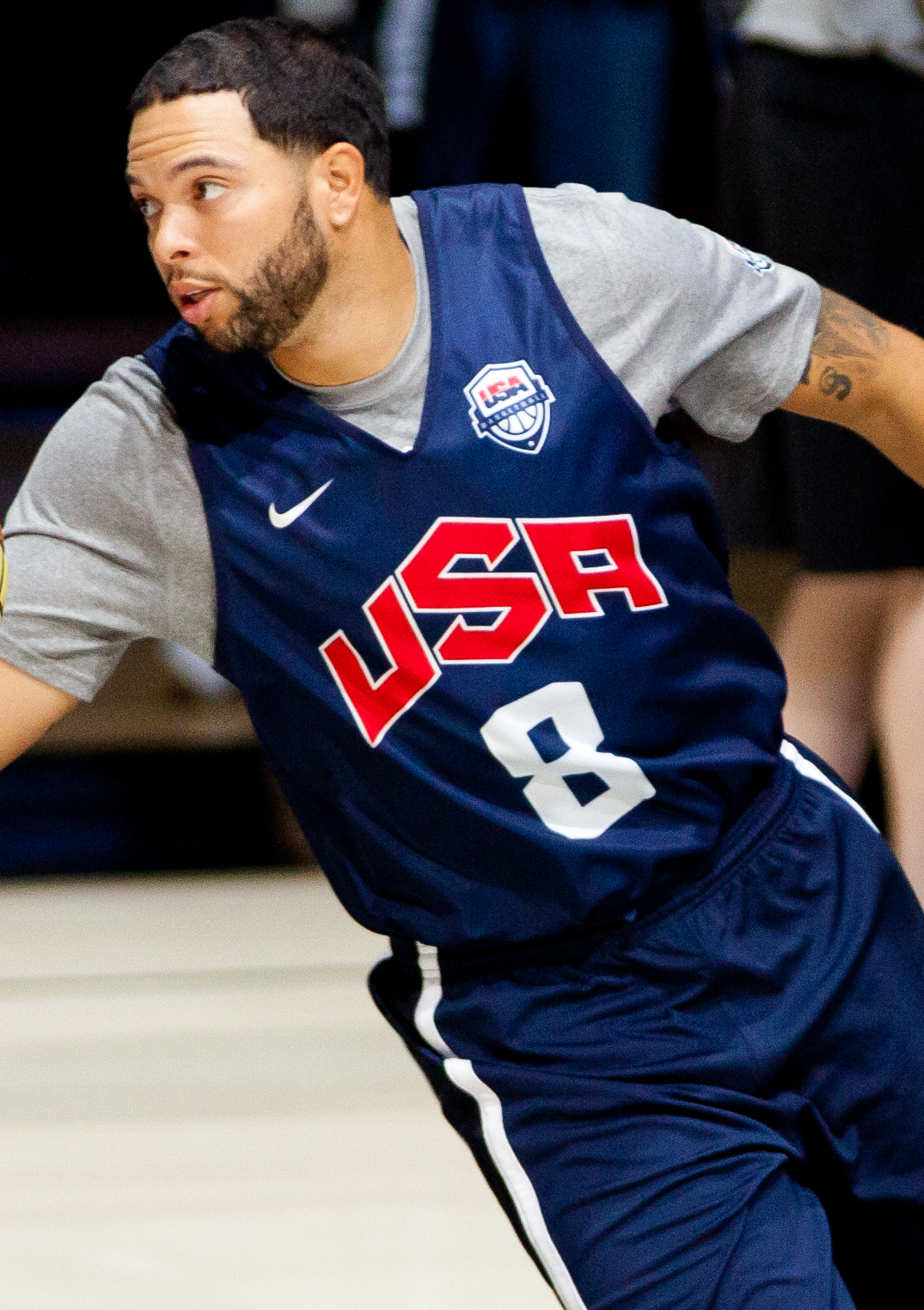
Williams with the United States Olympic team in 2012

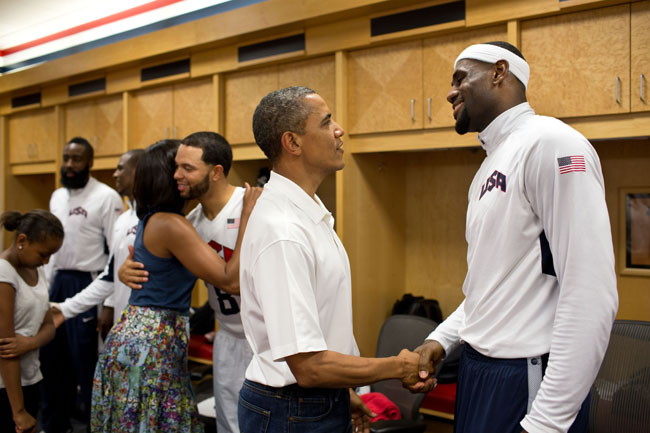
Williams and future Cavs teammate LeBron James meeting President Barack Obama and First Lady Michelle Obama

Williams won a bronze medal as a member of the United States U18 team at the FIBA Americas U18 Championship in 2002. He was selected as a member of the USA Olympic team for the 2008 Olympics on June 23, 2008. The team went unbeaten on the way to winning back the gold medal after defeating 2006 World Champion Spain and living up to their "Redeem Team" moniker after missing out in the 2004 Summer Olympics. In 8 games in the 2008 Olympics, Williams averaged 8.0 points per game with 2.8 assists. Williams was one of three-point guards on the national team, alongside Chris Paul and Jason Kidd.

In January 2012, Williams made the 19 man roster of the USA men's basketball team for the 2012 Summer Olympics. He ultimately made the final roster. The team won the gold medal by beating Spain for the second consecutive Olympics with a score of 107–100. During the Olympics, Williams averaged 9.0 points per game with 4.6 assists as he collected his second Olympic gold medal.

== Career statistics ==
=== NBA ===
Legend
GP	Games played	GS	Games started	MPG	Minutes per game
FG%	Field goal percentage	3P%	3-point field goal percentage	FT%	Free throw percentage
RPG	Rebounds per game	APG	Assists per game	SPG	Steals per game
BPG	Blocks per game	PPG	Points per game	**Bold**	Career high
*	Led the league

==== Regular season ====
Year	Team	GP	GS	MPG	FG%	3P%	FT%	RPG	APG	SPG	BPG	PPG
2005–06	Utah	80	47	28.8	.421	**.416**	.704	2.4	4.5	.8	.2	10.8
2006–07	Utah	80	80	36.9	.456	.322	.767	3.3	9.3	1.0	.2	16.2
2007–08	Utah	**82***	**82***	37.3	**.507**	.395	.803	3.0	10.5	1.1	.3	18.8
2008–09	Utah	68	68	36.8	.471	.310	.849	2.9	10.7	1.1	.3	19.4
2009–10	Utah	76	76	36.9	.469	.371	.801	4.0	10.5	1.3	.2	18.7
2010–11	Utah	53	53	37.9	.458	.345	.853	3.9	9.7	1.2	.2	**21.3**
2010–11	New Jersey	12	12	**38.0**	.349	.271	.793	**4.6**	**12.8**	1.3	.3	15.0
2011–12	New Jersey	55	55	36.3	.407	.336	.843	3.3	8.7	1.2	**.4**	21.0
2012–13	Brooklyn	78	78	36.4	.440	.378	.859	3.0	7.7	1.0	**.4**	18.9
2013–14	Brooklyn	64	58	32.2	.450	.366	.801	2.6	6.1	**1.5**	.2	14.3
2014–15	Brooklyn	68	55	31.1	.387	.386	.834	3.5	6.6	.9	.3	13.0
2015–16	Dallas	65	63	32.4	.414	.344	**.869**	2.9	5.8	.9	.2	14.1
2016–17	Dallas	40	40	29.3	.430	.348	.821	2.6	6.9	.6	.1	13.1
2016–17	Cleveland	20	4	20.3	.463	.415	.840	1.9	3.6	.3	.3	7.5
Career		845	771	34.2	.445	.357	.822	3.1	8.1	1.0	.2	16.3
All-Star		3	0	21.3	.552	.500	.000	2.3	5.7	2.0	.7	13.0

==== Playoffs ====
Year	Team	GP	GS	MPG	FG%	3P%	FT%	RPG	APG	SPG	BPG	PPG
2007	Utah	17	**17**	38.6	.452	.333	.790	4.3	8.6	1.5	.2	19.2
2008	Utah	12	12	**42.8**	**.492**	**.500**	.773	3.6	10.0	.6	.3	21.6
2009	Utah	5	5	42.2	.414	.360	.829	3.8	**10.8**	**1.8**	.4	20.2
2010	Utah	10	10	39.8	.450	.392	.802	2.7	10.2	1.0	.4	**24.3**
2013	Brooklyn	7	7	41.7	.425	.395	.822	3.1	8.4	1.0	**.6**	20.6
2014	Brooklyn	12	12	35.7	.395	.340	.800	3.2	5.8	1.1	.2	14.5
2015	Brooklyn	6	6	32.0	.391	.423	.857	**6.2**	5.5	1.3	.0	11.8
2016	Dallas	3	3	16.3	.333	.429	.000	.7	2.7	.3	.0	5.0
2017	Cleveland	**18**	0	14.6	.438	.387	**.909**	1.3	2.1	.6	.1	4.3
Career		90	72	33.4	.438	.393	.801	3.2	7.0	1.0	.2	15.7

=== College ===
Year	Team	GP	GS	MPG	FG%	3P%	FT%	RPG	APG	SPG	BPG	PPG
2002–03	Illinois	32	30	27.1	.426	.354	.533	3.0	4.5	**1.4**	.2	6.3
2003–04	Illinois	30	29	**33.9**	.408	**.394**	**.787**	3.2	6.2	1.0	**.3**	**14.0**
2004–05	Illinois	**39**	**39**	33.7	**.433**	.364	.677	**3.6**	**6.8**	1.0	.2	12.5
Career		101	98	31.7	.422	.374	.685	3.3	5.9	1.1	.2	11.0

== Personal life ==
Williams was baptized as a Christian in early 2010. He married Amy Young, whom he had known since second grade and had dated since high school, and with whom he has four children.

Williams appeared as himself on the Disney Channel show The Suite Life on Deck during the season 3 episode Twister: Part 1 along with Dwight Howard and Kevin Love.

An avid boxing and MMA fan, Williams has trained for years in mixed martial arts and boxing and owns a stake in Fortis MMA. On November 5, 2021, it was announced that he would be fighting on the undercard of the Jake Paul vs. Tommy Fury fight. On November 9, 2021, his opponent was revealed to be Frank Gore. Williams won the fight in a split decision.

== Exhibition boxing record ==
1 fight	1 win	0 losses
By decision	1	0

No.	Result	Record	Opponent	Type	Round, time	Date	Location	Notes
1	Win	1–0	(United States) Frank Gore	SD	4	Dec 18, 2021	(United States) Amalie Arena, Tampa, Florida, U.S.	

== Endorsements ==
Williams was the cover athlete for the video game NBA Baller Beats on the Xbox 360. He attended E3 2012 to promote the game, as well play the game in the NBA Baller Beats booth. Williams currently has endorsement deals with companies such as Nike, Vitaminwater, Red Bull and MetroPCS; he acquired many of the deals during his successful time with the Utah Jazz. Since joining the Nets, Williams has starred in commercials for Red Bull and MetroPCS.

== See also ==
- List of NBA career assists leaders
- List of NBA single-game 3-point field goal leaders
- List of NBA All-Stars
- List of Olympic medalists in basketball
- United States men's national basketball team
- NBA All-Rookie Team
