= 2012 United States men's Olympic basketball team =

National basketball squad

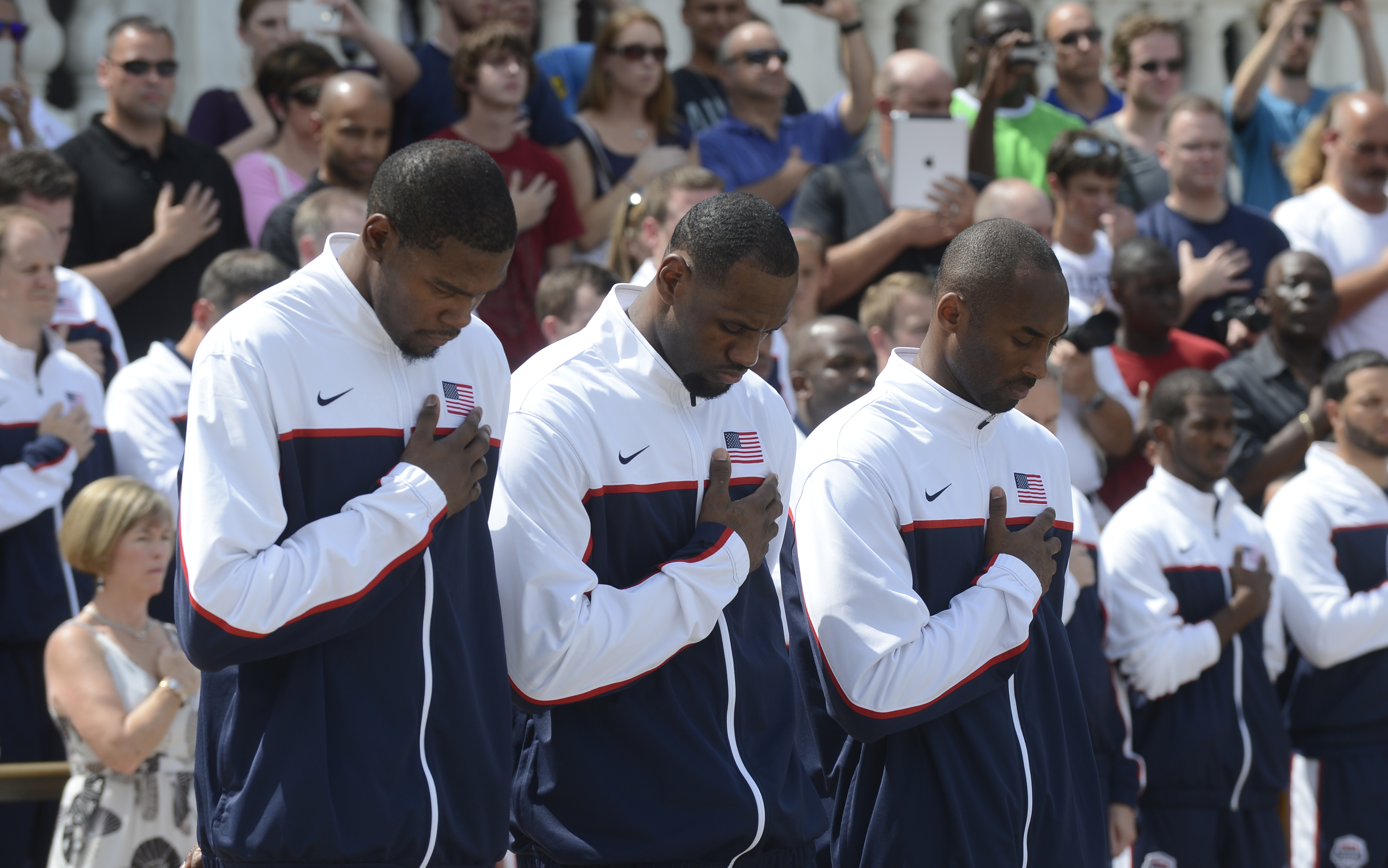
- The US men's Olympic basketball team at the Tomb of the Unknown Soldier in 2012
- Head coach: Mike Krzyzewski
- Scoring leader: Kevin Durant 19.5
- Rebounding leader: Kevin Love 7.6
- Assists leader: LeBron James 5.6

The men's national basketball team of the United States won the gold medal at the 2012 Summer Olympics in London. Defending the gold medal won by the 2008 team in the previous Olympic Games, the Americans qualified for the 2012 Games after winning the 2010 FIBA World Championship. The Olympic team lost some players to injuries who might have made the team, and appeared to be short on big men. Their roster featured five players returning from the 2008 Olympic team and five others from the 2010 World Championship.

The US went undefeated but appeared vulnerable in five exhibition games. They finished the tournament with a perfect 8–0 record, defeating opponents by an average of 32 points while trailing in the fourth quarter only once. The Americans often played with a small lineup that emphasized speed, quickness, and outside shooting. The team set an Olympic single-game record with 156 points scored against Nigeria in the preliminary round. In a rematch of the 2008 finals, Team USA again defeated Spain to capture the gold.

== Roster ==
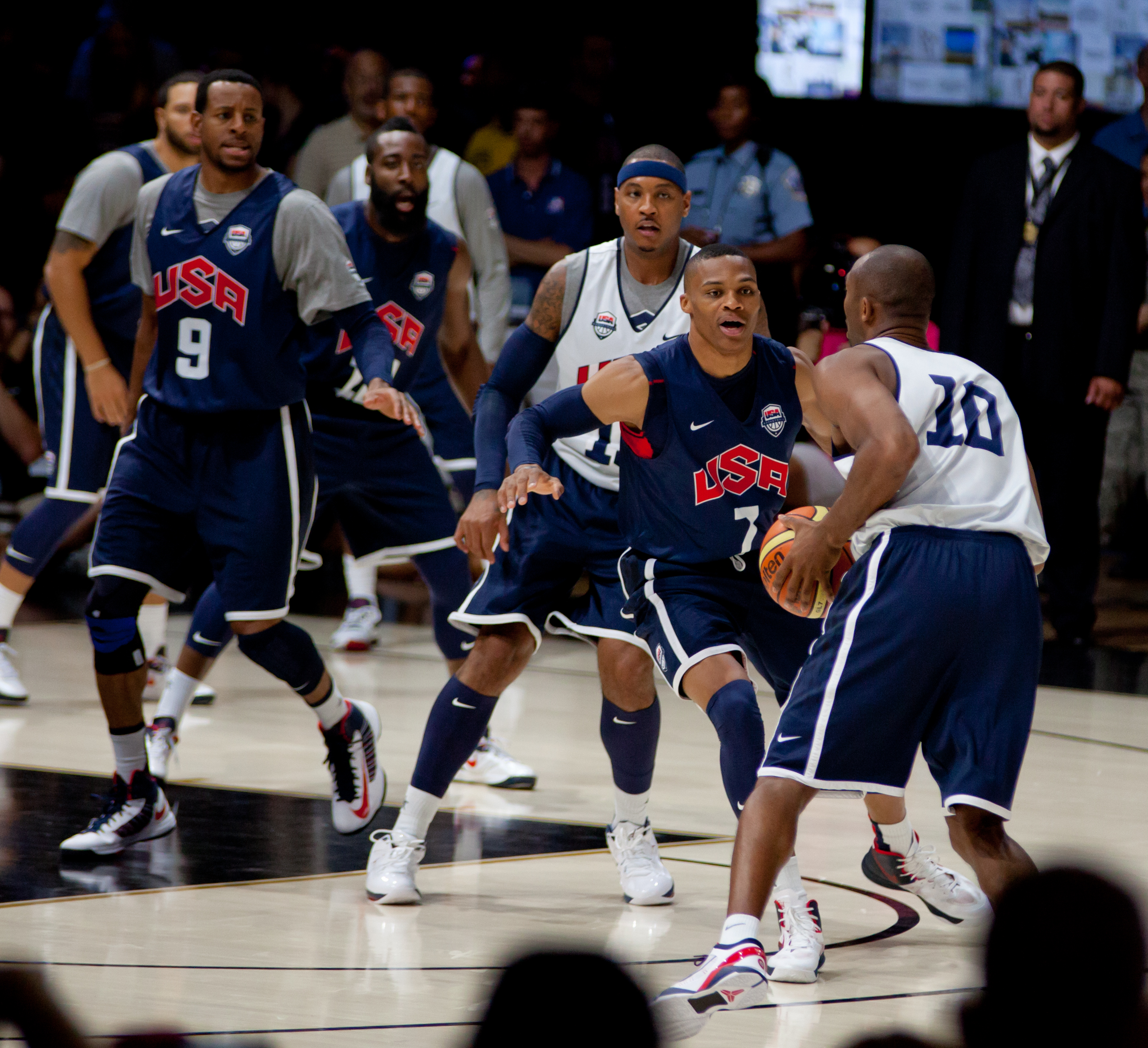
The 2012 team practicing in Washington, D.C.

The 2012 team consisted of returning 2008 Olympic gold medal winners small forwards LeBron James and Carmelo Anthony, point guards Chris Paul and Deron Williams, and shooting guard Kobe Bryant. It also featured 2010 World Championship winners small forwards Kevin Durant and Andre Iguodala, power forward Kevin Love, center Tyson Chandler, and point guard Russell Westbrook. Players earning All-NBA honors in the 2011–12 NBA season included Bryant, Durant, James and Paul on the first team; second-teamers Love and Westbrook; and Anthony and Chandler from the third team.

The final two Olympics roster spots were claimed by shooting guard James Harden and power forward Blake Griffin; they were chosen over shooting guard Eric Gordon, small forward Rudy Gay, and power forward Anthony Davis. Griffin then sustained a torn meniscus during practice and was replaced by Davis, the first overall pick of the 2012 NBA draft, who earlier was unable to practice during the final tryouts due to an ankle injury. Forward Lamar Odom removed himself from consideration in July before the start of training camp.

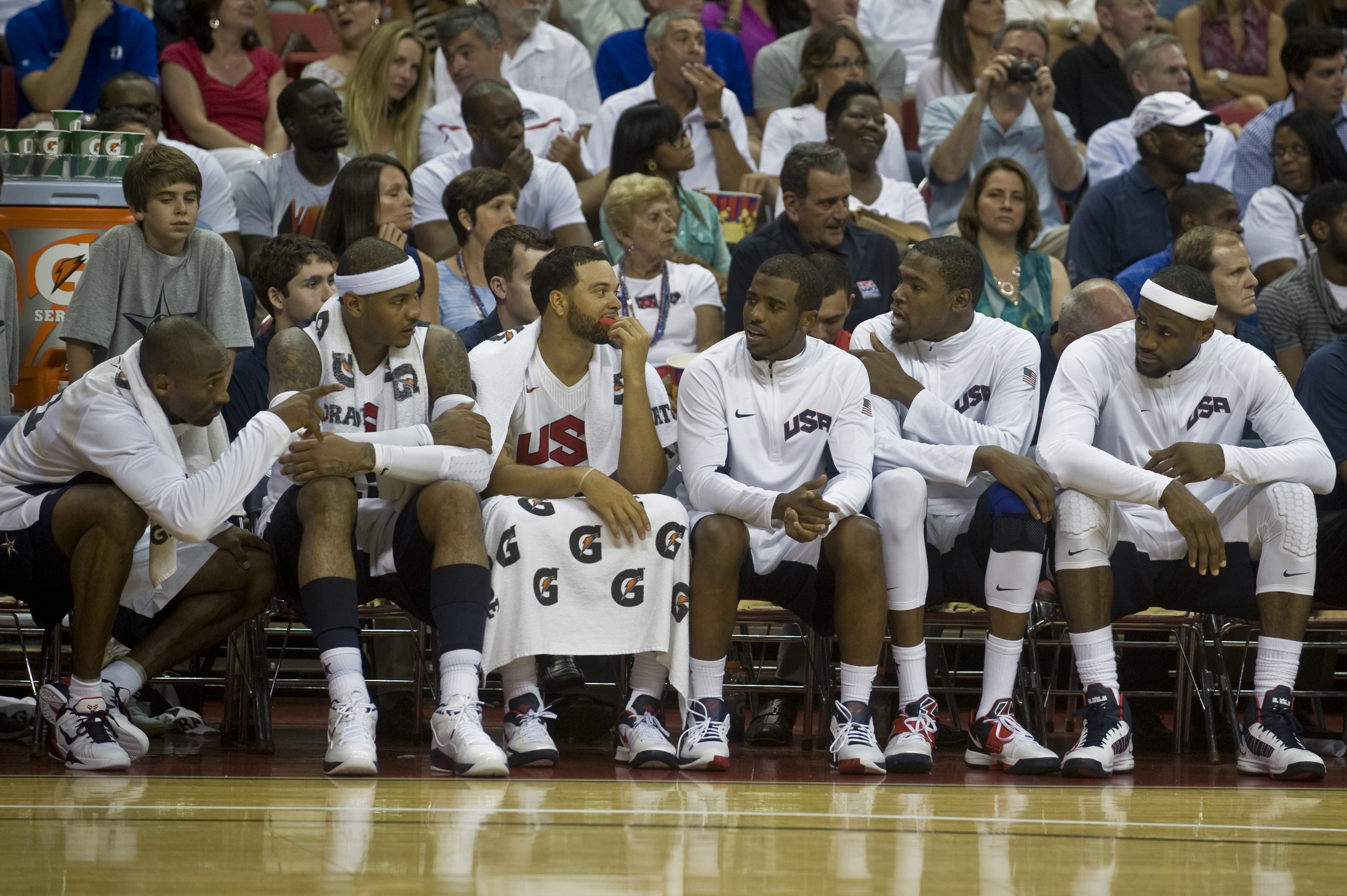
From left to right: Bryant, Anthony, Williams, Paul, Durant and James rest on the bench during a 4th quarter of an exhibition game vs. the Dominican Republic in Las Vegas on July, 2012

The initial 20 finalists were announced in January 2012. In addition to Griffin, others withdrew due to injury including power forwards Chris Bosh (abdomen) and LaMarcus Aldridge (torn meniscus), point guards Derrick Rose (ACL) and Chauncey Billups, shooting guard Dwyane Wade (knee), and center Dwight Howard (back surgery). Harden and Davis were added as replacements. Center Andrew Bynum declined an invitation to be added as a finalist.

The final team was built on quickness and speed. While the roster appeared to be weakened by the injuries to its inside players, Team USA executive director Jerry Colangelo believed the team was deeper, more athletic and more experienced than the 2008 gold-medal team.

The following is the United States roster in the men's basketball tournament of the 2012 Summer Olympics.

United States men's national basketball team – 2012 Summer Olympics roster
Players
Coaches

Pos.	No.	Name	Age – Date of birth	Height	Club
C	4	Tyson Chandler	29 – October 2, 1982	7 ft 1 in (2.16 m)	New York Knicks
F	5	Kevin Durant	23 – September 29, 1988	6 ft 10 in (2.08 m)	Oklahoma City Thunder
F	6	LeBron James	27 – December 30, 1984	6 ft 8 in (2.03 m)	Miami Heat
G	7	Russell Westbrook	23 – November 12, 1988	6 ft 3 in (1.91 m)	Oklahoma City Thunder
G	8	Deron Williams	28 – June 26, 1984	6 ft 3 in (1.91 m)	Brooklyn Nets
F	9	Andre Iguodala	28 – January 28, 1984	6 ft 6 in (1.98 m)	Philadelphia 76ers
G	10	Kobe Bryant	33 – August 23, 1978	6 ft 6 in (1.98 m)	Los Angeles Lakers
F	11	Kevin Love	23 – September 7, 1988	6 ft 9 in (2.06 m)	Minnesota Timberwolves
G	12	James Harden	22 – August 26, 1989	6 ft 5 in (1.96 m)	Oklahoma City Thunder
G	13	Chris Paul	27 – May 6, 1985	6 ft 0 in (1.83 m)	Los Angeles Clippers
C	14	Anthony Davis	19 – March 11, 1993	6 ft 10 in (2.08 m)	Kentucky Wildcats
F	15	Carmelo Anthony	28 – May 29, 1984	6 ft 7 in (2.01 m)	New York Knicks

Head coach

- Mike Krzyzewski

Assistant coach(es)

- Jim Boeheim
- Mike D'Antoni
- Nate McMillan
- Jerry Colangelo (executive director)

Legend

- Club – describes last
  club before the tournament
- Age – describes age
  on 29 July 2012

== Exhibition games ==
The United States went undefeated at 5–0 in their exhibition games, but were behind early against Brazil and Spain and played a close game against Argentina.

July 12, 2012

Report

United States	113–59	Dominican Republic
Scoring by quarter: 26–12, 24–15, 29–14, 34–18
Pts: Durant 24; Rebs: Durant 10; Asts: Williams 10		Pts: Fortuna 10; Rebs: Martinez 9 Asts: Horford 3

Thomas and Mack Center, Paradise, US
Referees: José Carrion, Bill Kennedy, Scott Bolnick

July 16, 2012

Report

United States	80–69	Brazil
Scoring by quarter: 17–27, 20–5, 22–19, 21–18
Pts: James 30; Rebs: James 6 Asts: Paul 3		Pts: Garcia 14; Rebs: Varejão 13; Asts: Huertas 3

Verizon Center, Washington, D.C., US

July 18, 2012

Report

United States	118–78	Great Britain
Scoring by quarter: 33–20, 22–17, 34–18, 29–23
Pts: Anthony, Williams 21; Rebs: Iguodala, James 6 Asts: Westbrook 9		Pts: Deng 25; Rebs: Mensah-Bonsu 9 Asts: Deng 4

Manchester Arena, Manchester, United Kingdom

July 22, 2012

Report

United States	86–80	Argentina
Scoring by quarter: 31–16, 16–24, 25–21, 14–19
Pts: Durant 27; Rebs: Chandler 8 Asts: Durant 6		Pts: Ginóbili 23; Rebs: Scola 6 Asts: Prigioni 6

Palau Sant Jordi, Barcelona, Spain

July 24, 2012

Report

United States	100–78	Spain
Scoring by quarter: 21–23, 27–17, 26–20, 26–18
Pts: Anthony 27; Rebs: Love 10; Asts: James 7		Pts: Gasol 19; Rebs: Gasol 5 Asts: Calderón 8

Palau Sant Jordi, Barcelona, Spain
Referees: Jose Bertain, Marat Kogut, Oscvar Lorente

== Olympic play ==
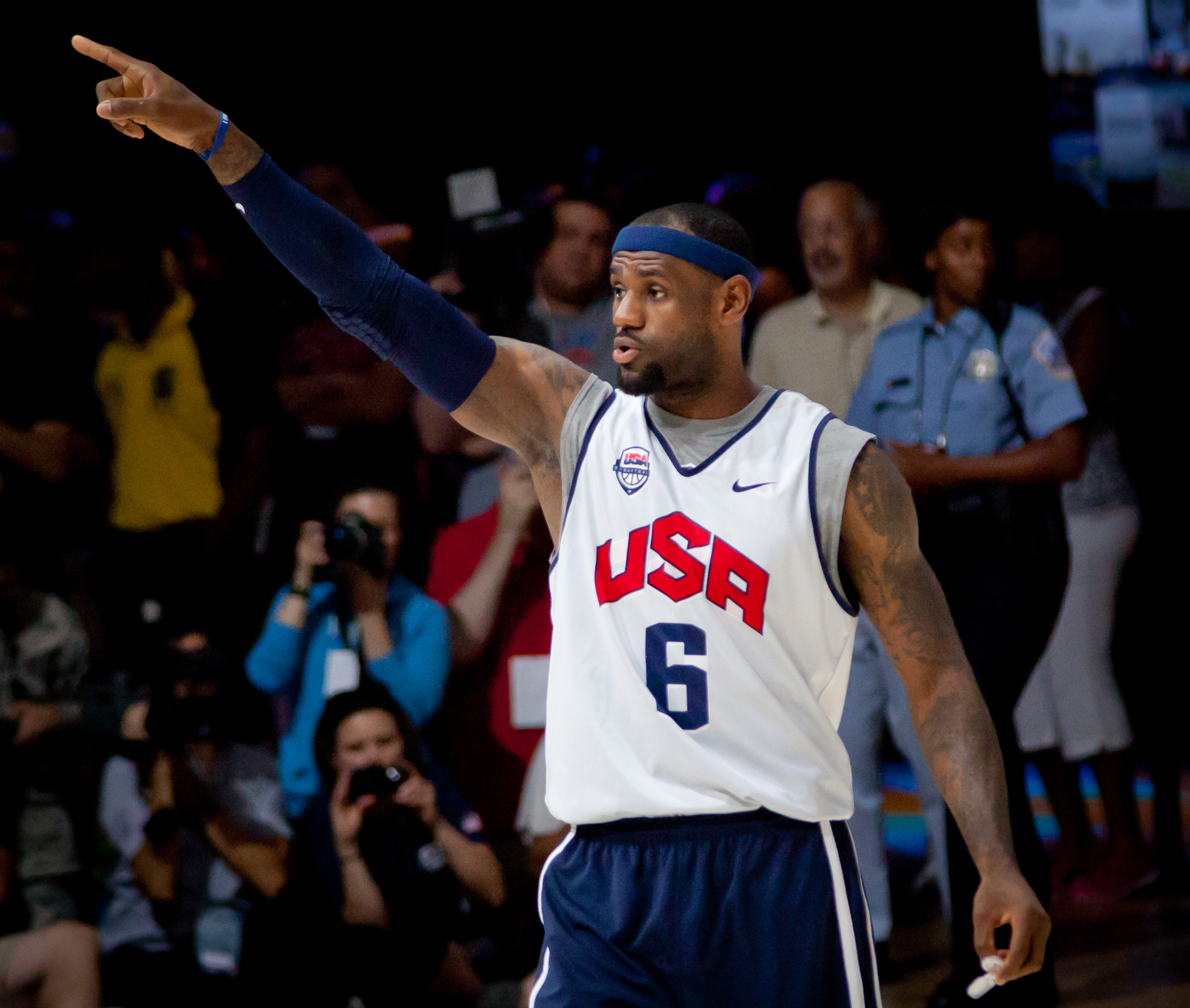
LeBron James assumed leadership of Team USA in 2012.

The Americans went an undefeated 8–0 and averaged 116 points per game, winning by an average margin of 32.1 points—the fifth highest in US Olympic history. Team USA trailed in the fourth quarter only once, against Lithuania in the opening round. James became the leader of the team with Bryant—who would turn 34 in August 2012—stepping back. James facilitated the offense from the post and perimeter, called the defensive sets, and provided scoring when needed. After winning the gold, Team USA coach Mike Krzyzewski said James "is the best player, he is the best leader and he is as smart as anybody playing the game right now". Durant scored a United States Olympics record of 156 points in the tournament. He also made 34 three-point field goals, doubling the previous United States mark of 17; Anthony (23) also surpassed the former record. Bryant was not in peak condition early, but he played himself into shape and was a key contributor in the final three games. While Chandler was the team's only true center—Davis was thin and had no professional experience—Krzyzewski also played Love, James or Anthony as Team USA's de facto center. Love led the team with 61 rebounds (27 offensive).

Compensating for its lack of big men, the US played small ball and spread its playmakers around the three-point line and with a player penetrating and passing the ball back outside. They won with "basically five players on the perimeter," Spain coach Sergio Scariolo said. Bryant and Krzyzewski declared at the completion of the tournament that 2012 was their final Olympic appearance. They both joined Team USA after the disappointing bronze finish in the 2004 Games. Krzyzewski left with a 62–1 record and a 50-game winning streak in international play for the Americans. He joined Henry Iba as the only US coaches to lead the team to consecutive Olympic gold medals. In 2013, Team USA announced Krzyzewski would return as head coach from 2013 through 2016.

=== Preliminary round ===
The US competed in Group A in the opening round. Teams played in a round-robin format with the top four teams advancing to the next round. The Americans ended group play 5–0, the only undefeated team and the group's top seed.

Pos	Team	Pld	W	L	PF	PA	PD	Pts	Qualification
1	United States	5	5	0	589	398	+191	10	Quarterfinals
2	France	5	4	1	376	378	−2	9	Quarterfinals
3	Argentina	5	3	2	448	424	+24	8	Quarterfinals
4	Lithuania	5	2	3	395	399	−4	7	Quarterfinals
5	Nigeria	5	1	4	338	456	−118	6	
6	Tunisia	5	0	5	320	411	−91	5	

Source: FIBA archive
Rules for classification: 1) points; 2) head-to-head points; 3) head-to-head goal average; 4) head-to-head number of points scored.

==== France ====
29 July 2012
14:30

Report

United States	98–71	France
Scoring by quarter: 22–21, 30–15, 26–15, 20–20
Pts: Durant 22; Rebs: three players 9 Asts: James 8		Pts: Traoré 12; Rebs: Turiaf 9 Asts: de Colo 3

Basketball Arena, London
Referees: Cristiano Maranho (BRA), Saša Pukl (SLO), Michael Aylen (AUS)

Durant scored 22 points, and James had eight assists while taking only six shots as the US won their opening game 98–71 over France. The US was never in any real trouble, but played sloppy in the beginning, missing their first six three-point attempts and being called for 18 personal fouls in the first half. Anthony and Westbrook spent the final six minutes of the half on the bench after their third personal fouls. The team led 52–36 at halftime, which expanded to 78–51 after three quarters. Krzyzewski was able to rest Bryant, James, and Durant for most of the final period, and even the 19-year-old Davis played.

Durant, Anthony, and Chandler contributed nine rebounds each, and Love finished with 14 points. Bryant, James and Durant finished the game a combined 6 for 12 on three-pointers, while the rest of the team shot 2 for 13. France's team featured six NBA players, including Tony Parker.

==== Tunisia ====
31 July 2012
22:15

Report

Tunisia	63–110	United States
Scoring by quarter: 15–21, 18–25, 14–39, 16–25
Pts: Ben Romdhane 22; Rebs: Ben Romdhane 11; Asts: Ben Romdhane 4		Pts: Love, Anthony 16; Rebs: Durant 10; Asts: Paul 7

Basketball Arena, London
Referees: Vaughan Mayberry (AUS), Samir Abaakil (MAR), Oļegs Latiševs (LAT)

The US won in a 110–63 blowout over Tunisia, but only after Krzyzewski benched his starters—Bryant, James, Durant, Paul, and Chandler—to begin the second half. The reserves—Love, Anthony, Iguodala, Williams and Westbrook—responded with a 21–3 run to open the half, turning a 46–33 halftime lead to a 67–36 advantage. Tunisia, the consensus weakest team in the Olympics and listed by one website as 54-point underdogs, led the game 15–12 after nine minutes, and trailed only 35–30 with about 3 1/2 minutes remaining in the first half. The Americans then scored 11 consecutive points.

Like the opening game when they missed their first six three-pointers, the US started this game an even worse 0-for-8. Colangelo said opponents' strategy was to force the Americans to shoot from outside and hope for an off night. The US made 17 of 22 on conventional field goals in the first half, while missing 10 of 12 from three-point range. This was the team's second consecutive slow start in the Olympics, following the pattern in their five earlier exhibition games. The Americans scored on a variety of dunks once the game was in hand. Anthony and Love led the team with 16 points. Six Americans scored in double figures, including Durant who had 13 points and added 10 rebounds and 5 assists.

==== Nigeria ====
2 August 2012
22:15

Report

United States	156–73	Nigeria
Scoring by quarter: 49–25, 29–20, 41–17, 37–11
Pts: Anthony 37; Rebs: Davis, Love 6 Asts: Williams 11		Pts: Diogu 27; Rebs: Diogu 7 Asts: Aminu 4

Basketball Arena, London
Referees: Juan Arteaga (ESP), Robert Lottermoser (GER), Elena Chernova (RUS)

The US answered critics of their slow starts and outside shooting with a 156–73 blowout of Nigeria. The Americans scored an Olympic-record 78 points in the first half en route to breaking the record for points in a game of 138, set by Brazil against Egypt in 1988. The record was broken with 4:37 left to play, and the team set US records for 3-pointers (29), field goals (59), field goal percentage (71%), and margin of victory (83).

Anthony scored 37 points in only 14 minutes of play, shooting 10 of 12 on three-pointers and breaking the US single-game scoring record in less than three quarters. He broke Stephon Marbury's record of 31 against Spain in 2004. Bryant scored 16 points, 14 in the first quarter, as the US scored 49 points in the opening period. They led 78–45 at halftime before doubling their scoring total in the second half. The Americans shot 29 of 46 on three-point attempts (63 percent). They more than doubled their previous record of 13 made, which was broken by halftime after 11 three-pointers in the first quarter alone. Krzyzewski defended the blowout, noting that he removed his stars in the second half, ordered a zone defense, and stopped allowing fast breaks in the opening period.

==== Lithuania ====
4 August 2012
14:30

Report

Lithuania	94–99	United States
Scoring by quarter: 25–33, 26–22, 21–23, 22–21
Pts: Kleiza 25; Rebs: Pocius 7 Asts: Jasikevičius, Pocius 6		Pts: James, Anthony 20; Rebs: Love 8 Asts: Paul 6

Basketball Arena, London
Referees: Recep Ankaralı (TUR), Luigi Lamonica (ITA), Marcos Benito (BRA)

Mainly a facilitator in the first three games, James scored 9 of his 20 points in the final four minutes as the US came back to defeat Lithuania 99–94. Linas Kleiza scored 25 to lead Lithuania, which led by 84–82 with 5:50 remaining. The US took a three-point lead, but Lithuania pulled within 87–86 with 4:12 in the game. James followed with a three-pointer and a dunk. Entering the contest, James was averaging just 6.7 points but with 5.7 assists.

Anthony added 20 points, and Paul contributed seven rebounds, six assists and four of the Americans' 17 steals. The US made only 10 of 33 attempts on three-point attempts and too often settled for outside shots. Lithuania outrebounded the US 42–37 and shot an impressive 58 percent from the field. The Americans struggled to defend Lithuania's high pick-and-roll. However, the US team's deep bench wore Lithuania down in the final period, forcing several turnovers to determine the outcome in the final minutes. Winning their first three games by an average of 52.2 points and playing so well, the team had canceled their previous two practices and rested while watching other sports instead.

==== Argentina ====
6 August 2012
22:15

Report

Argentina	97–126	United States
Scoring by quarter: 32–34, 27–26, 17–42, 21–24
Pts: Ginóbili 16; Rebs: Ginóbili 5 Asts: Campazzo 7		Pts: Durant 28; Rebs: Iguodala, Love 9 Asts: Paul 7

Basketball Arena, London
Referees: Christos Christodoulou (GRE), Ilija Belošević (SRB), Stephen Seibel (CAN)

Durant scored 17 of his 28 points in the third quarter as the US turned a one-point game into a 126–97 blowout over Argentina. The US led just 60–59 at halftime, when Durant matched Argentina's point total during a 42-point third quarter explosion by the Americans. James scored the first seven in the quarter before Durant took over and shot 5 of 6 from three-point range. He finished 8 of 10 from three-point range, and the team was 20 of 39. James had 18 points in the game, and Paul added 17.

The US allowed Argentina to make 11 of its first 15 shots, and the Americans lead was never bigger than six in the second quarter. Argentina's Luis Scola did not play in the second period, and starting point guard Pablo Prigioni sat the entire game. They rested their starters in the fourth quarter in preparation for their quarterfinal meeting against Brazil, and a possible rematch against the Americans in the semifinals. Manu Ginóbili led the Argentines with 16 points, all in the first half. The US finished the first round as the top seed in their group and the only team undefeated in group play. An American loss by at least 13 points would have placed Argentina instead into the top spot from Group A.

=== Knockout round ===
Quarterfinals
A1	United States	119
B4	Australia	86
B2	Brazil	77
A3	Argentina	82
B1	Russia	83
A4	Lithuania	74
A2	France	59
B3	Spain	66

Semifinals
A1	United States	109
A3	Argentina	83
B1	Russia	59
B3	Spain	67

Gold medal match
A1	United States	107
B3	Spain	100
Bronze medal match
A3	Argentina	77
B1	Russia	81

The single-elimination round features the top four teams from each of the two groups from the opening round.

==== Quarterfinal – Australia ====
8 August 2012
22:15

Report

United States	119–86	Australia
Scoring by quarter: 28–21, 28–21, 28–28, 35–16
Pts: Bryant 20; Rebs: James 14; Asts: James 11		Pts: Mills 26; Rebs: Ingles 8 Asts: Ingles 6

North Greenwich Arena, London
Referees: Luigi Lamonica (ITA), Fernando Sampietro (ARG), Samir Abaakil (MAR)

Bryant made six straight three-pointers in the second half and James finished with the first triple-double in US Olympic history. (Note: Assists were recorded as an official statistic starting in 1976.) The Americans surrendered 11 consecutive points to start the second half. The US was leading by six when Bryant, who shot 0 for 3 in the first half, made consecutive threes to give his team a 70–58 lead. He scored all of his 20 points in the second half, including four consecutive three-pointers in a 66-second span. He entered the game averaging only 9.4 points.

James finished with 11 points, 14 rebounds and 11 assists, and he almost had a triple-double by halftime (seven points, 10 rebounds, and six assists). Love added 10 points and 11 rebounds (eight offensive), Anthony scored 17, and Durant had 14.

==== Semifinal – Argentina ====
10 August 2012
21:00

Report

Argentina	83–109	United States
Scoring by quarter: 19–24, 21–23, 17–27, 26–35
Pts: Ginobili 18; Rebs: Delfino 5 Asts: Prigioni 6		Pts: Durant 19; Rebs: Love 9 Asts: James, Paul 7

North Greenwich Arena, London
Referees: Carl Jungebrand (FIN), Recep Ankaralı (TUR), Robert Lottermoser (GER)

The US met Argentina for the third time in a span of 17 days in the third straight Olympic semifinal meeting between the two countries. Argentina in 2004 was the last team to beat the Americans in Olympic play.

Durant scored 19 points, while James and Anthony added 18 each as the US pulled away from Argentina in the second half for a 109–83 win. Ginóbili hit a three-pointer at the buzzer at the end of the first half to bring Argentina within 47–40, and he scored another three to open the second half to cut the lead to four points. Durant and James took over the game as the Americans led by 17 points to start the fourth.

Bryant scored 13 points in the first half—including 11 in the first quarter—and Durant made four three-pointers in the third, while Anthony made four of his own in the fourth. The US made 18 three-pointers in the game. James finished the game with seven rebounds and seven assists.

==== Final – Spain ====
12 August 2012
15:00

Report 1
Report 2

(gold) United States	107–100	Spain (silver)
Scoring by quarter: 35–27, 24–31, 24–24, 24–18
Pts: Durant 30; Rebs: Durant, Love 9 Asts: James 4		Pts: P. Gasol 24; Rebs: Ibaka 9 Asts: P. Gasol 7

North Greenwich Arena, London
Referees: Cristiano Maranho (BRA), Christos Christodoulou (GRE), Michael Aylen (AUS)

The US met Spain in the gold medal game, a rematch of the finals in the 2008 Olympics. The Americans had won 118–107 in Beijing that year after leading by just four with about 2 1/2 minutes left. Spain in 2012 was ranked second in the world behind the US, and had a size advantage with brothers Pau and Marc Gasol. The Spaniards lost games to Russia and Brazil in group play and trailed the Russians by 13 points early in their semifinal win. The US had also beaten Spain for Olympic gold in 1984. The Americans were 8–1 against Spain since the introduction of the NBA players into FIBA events in 1992.

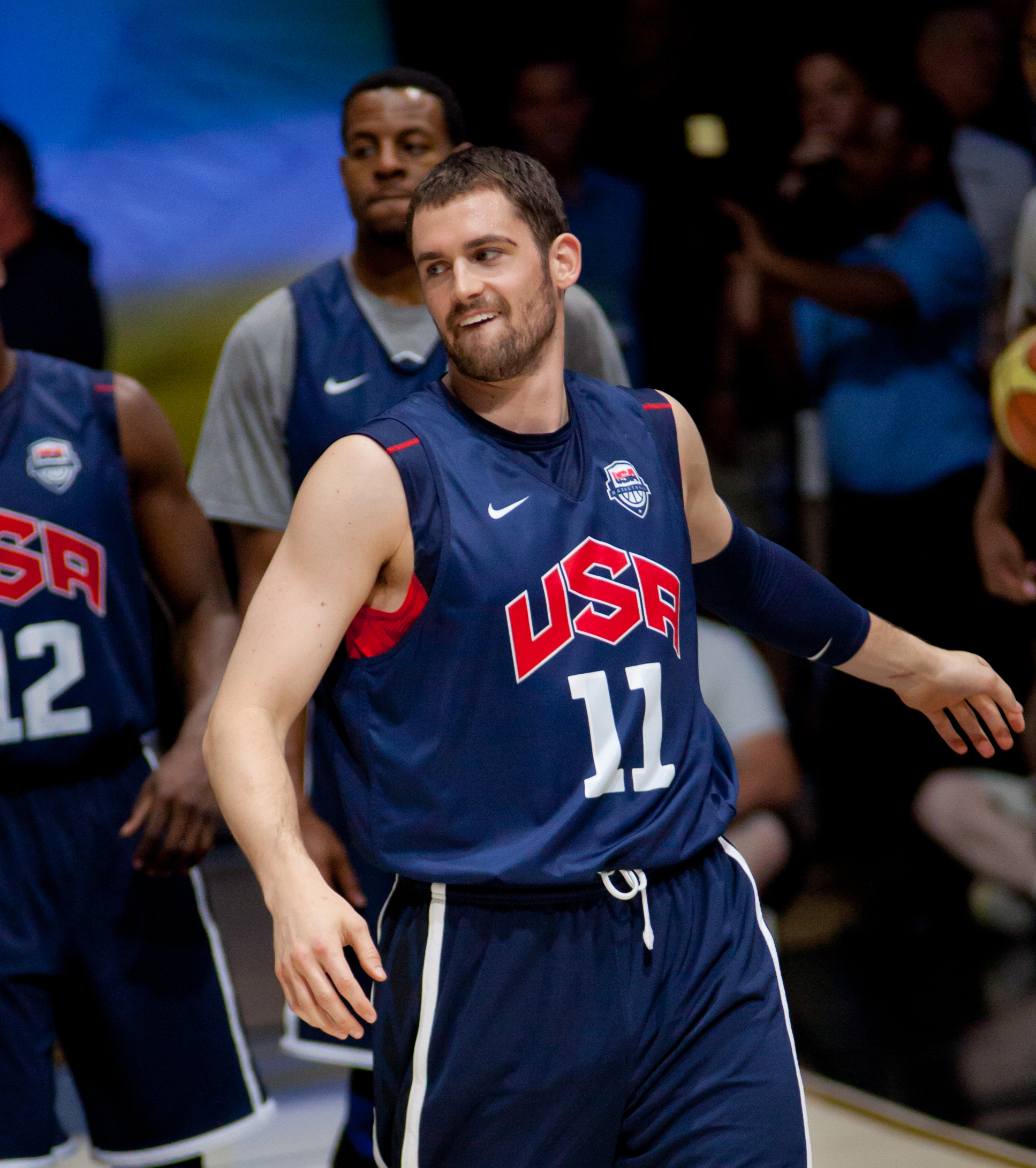
Kevin Love had nine rebounds in the gold medal game.

The Olympics' own daily preview of the 2012 rematch said it would "likely take a great game from Spain and an off-day from the US to cause an upset". The Americans had been tested only once against Lithuania, and they had dominated opponents in points off turnovers (198–77) and fast-break points (175–55). In a game that was close until the final minutes, the US defeated Spain 107–100. The Americans led the Spanish by only one point after three quarters, but James scored on a dunk and then a three-point basket for a 102–93 lead with 1:59 to play. James had 19 points in the game, joining Michael Jordan as the only players to win the NBA regular-season Most Valuable Player (MVP) award, NBA championship, NBA Finals MVP, and Olympic gold in the same year. Durant added 30 points, the first 30-point game in an Olympic final in US history. Spain was led by Pau Gasol with 24 points, including his team's first 13 points in the second half to give them a 71–70 lead halfway into the third quarter. Gasol added eight rebounds and seven assists in the game.

Spain also trailed by one after the first half, which included their guard Juan Carlos Navarro scoring 19 of his 21 points. The Spanish kept the game close despite Marc Gasol being called for four fouls in the first quarter and a half. James, who frequently guarded one of the Gasols due to the Americans' lack of big men, went to the bench with 7:23 in the game after his fourth foul before returning for the final five minutes. Bryant had 17 in the game for Team USA, and Love contributed nine points and nine rebounds. The final margin of seven points was the second-closest Olympic final ever after the Soviet Union's controversial one-point defeat of the United States in 1972.

=== Statistics ===
Legend
GP	Games played	GS	Games started	MPG	Minutes per game
FGM	Field goals made	FGA	Field goals attempted	FG%	Field goal percentage
3PM	3-point field goals made	3PA	3-point field goals attempted	3P%	3-point field goal percentage
FTM	Free throws made	FTA	Free throws attempted	FT%	Free throw percentage
RPG	Rebounds per game	APG	Assists per game	PPG	Points per game

Player	GP	GS	MPG	FGM	FGA	FG%	3PM	3PA	3P%	FTM	FTA	FT%	RPG	APG	PPG
Kevin Durant	8	8	26.0	49	101	.485	34	65	.523	24	27	.889	5.8	2.6	19.5
Chris Paul	8	8	25.8	25	49	.510	13	28	.464	3	6	.500	2.5	5.1	8.3
LeBron James	8	8	25.1	44	73	.603	6	20	.300	12	16	.750	5.6	5.6	13.3
Deron Williams	8	0	18.0	23	59	.390	13	32	.406	13	17	.765	1.5	4.6	9.0
Carmelo Anthony	8	0	17.8	46	86	.535	23	46	.500	15	19	.789	4.8	1.3	16.3
Kobe Bryant	8	8	17.5	30	70	.429	17	39	.436	20	22	.909	1.8	1.3	12.1
Kevin Love	8	0	17.0	34	54	.630	8	22	.364	17	30	.567	7.6	0.4	11.6
Russell Westbrook	8	0	13.8	22	46	.478	4	12	.333	20	27	.741	1.6	1.6	8.5
Andre Iguodala	8	0	12.1	14	20	.700	5	9	.556	1	2	.500	2.8	1.4	4.3
Tyson Chandler	8	8	11.3	14	20	.700	0	0	.000	4	12	.333	4.0	0.4	4.0
James Harden	8	0	9.1	17	34	.500	6	20	.300	4	7	.571	0.6	0.8	5.5
Anthony Davis	7	0	7.6	11	17	.647	0	0	.000	4	6	.667	2.7	0.0	3.7
Total	8	8	200.0	329	629	.523	129	293	.440	137	191	.717	44.6	25.0	115.5
Opponents	8	8	200.0	244	537	.454	61	184	.332	118	169	.698	35.5	17.8	83.4

== Dream Team comparisons ==
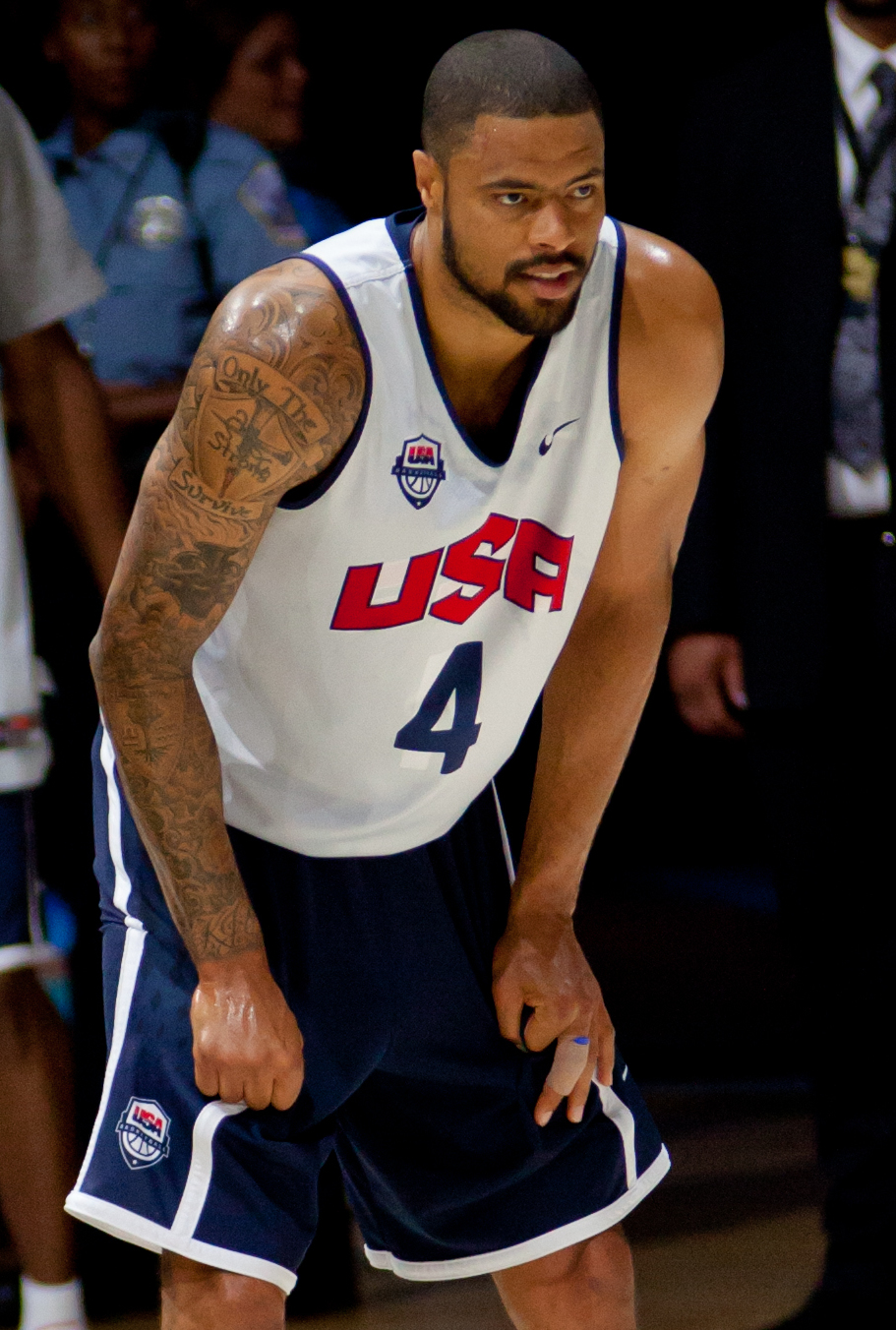
Tyson Chandler was the only 7-foot (2.1 m) player on the 2012 team

Bryant and James believed the 2012 team would win against the Dream Team, the 1992 Olympic team considered by some the greatest sports team ever assembled. Bryant said, "[T]hey were a lot older, at kind of the end of their careers. We have just a bunch of young racehorses, guys that are eager to compete". Dream Team member Charles Barkley said that he "just started laughing" upon hearing Bryant's comment and thought the 1992 team would win by double digits. Michael Jordan added: "For [Bryant] to compare those two teams is not one of the smarter things he ever could have done... Remember now, they learned from us. We didn't learn from them". Bird joked, "They probably could. I haven't played in 20 years and we're all old now." Bryant later clarified that he thought the 1992 team was better, but it was "ludicrous" to think his team could not beat the Dream Team in one game. "You didn't ask me if we could beat them in a 7-game series", he said.

Most experts believed the 1992 team would prevail with a distinct advantage with their centers, David Robinson and Patrick Ewing, over the smaller 2012 team. Chandler was the only 7-foot (2.1 m) player on the 2012 team, but his offensive game was limited. Some felt the discussion might have been more compelling if Dwight Howard and other injured big men were on the 2012 squad. NBA coach Doc Rivers felt the London team had an advantage with their outside shooting over the Dream Team. Like Barkley, CBSSports.com opined that only three members of the 2012 team—Bryant, James, and Durant—would have made the Dream Team.

The Dream Team averaged 117.3 points and won its games by an average of 43.8 points. The 2012 team averaged a similar point total (115.5) but won by a lesser margin (32.1). The Dream Team beat Croatia by 32 in the gold-medal game, while the 2012 team won by just seven. However, the level of international competition improved since 1992. The 2012 team faced a tougher opponent in Spain, which had seven NBA players; Croatia in 1992 had only two NBA players at that point. Overall, the 2012 Olympic field had 39 NBA players and 18 former NBA players were on team rosters, while rosters in 1992 had 17 NBA players and three other former players—more than half of those NBA players were on the Dream Team.
