= 2025 BAL final =

Basketball Africa League championship game

- Promotional material for the final
- Event: 2025 BAL season
Al Ahli Tripoli	Petro de Luanda
(Libya)	(Angola)
(8–1)	(5–4)
88	67
Head coach: Fouad Abou Chakra	Head coach: Sergio Valdeolmillos
	1	2	3	4	Total
Al Ahli Tripoli	27	16	23	22	88
Petro de Luanda	19	19	16	13	67
- Date: 14 June 2025
- Venue: SunBet Arena, Pretoria, South Africa
- Favorite: Al Ahli Tripoli (1.39 decimal odds)
- Referees: Julian Scott, Yann Vezo Davidson, Annie Joyce Muchenu
- Attendance: 6,853

The 2025 BAL final was the championship game of the 2025 BAL season, the third season of the Basketball Africa League (BAL), and the conclusion of the playoffs. The final was played on 14 June 2025 at the SunBet Arena in Pretoria, South Africa, which was the venue for the first time. The final was contested by Angolan club Petro de Luanda and Libyan club Al Ahli Tripoli.

Al Ahli Tripoli won the final, defeating the defending champions Petro, 88–67, becoming the first Libyan team to win the title, as well as the first team that qualified through the Road to BAL to win the league. As winners, Al Ahli qualified for the 2025 FIBA Intercontinental Cup.

== Background ==
Al Ahly Ly guard Solo Diabate played a in a record-extending fourth final, and had the chance to become the first player to win three BAL championships. Al Ahli Tripoli was favored by betmakers ahead of the final.

=== Previous finals ===
In the following table, finals played in the FIBA Africa Clubs Champions Cup (ACC), the previous highest level continental competition, are in small text.

Team	Previous final appearances (bold indicates winners)
(Angola) Petro de Luanda	BAL: 2 (2022, **2024**); FIBA ACC: 8 (1994, 1999, 2000, **2006**, 2007, 2009, 2012, **2015**)
(Libya) Al Ahly Tripoli	None

== Road to the final ==
(Libya) Al Ahli Tripoli		Round	(Angola) Petro de Luanda	
Opponent	Result	Conference phase	Opponent	Result
**Nile Conference**: Pos / Team / Pld / PCT; **1** / (Libya) Al Ahli Tripoli / **6** / **1.000**; 2 / (Rwanda) APR (H) / 6 / **.500**; 3 / (South Africa) MBB / 6 / **.333**; 4 / (Kenya) Nairobi City Thunder / 6 / **.167**; Source: BAL (H) Hosts		Standings	**Sahara Conference**: Pos / Team / Pld / PCT; 1 / (Tunisia) US Monastir / 6 / **.667**; **2** / (Angola) Petro de Luanda / **6** / **.500**; 3 / (Cape Verde) Kriol Star / 6 / **.500**; 4 / (Senegal) ASC Ville de Dakar (H) / 6 / **.333**; Source: BAL (H) Hosts	
(South Africa) MBB	**W** 87–77	Matchday 1	(Cape Verde) Kriol Star	**W** 103–74
(Kenya) Nairobi City Thunder	**W** 115–87	Matchday 2	(Tunisia) US Monastir	**L** 73–87
(Rwanda) APR	**W** 90–68	Matchday 3	(Senegal) ASC Ville de Dakar	**L** 64–65
(Kenya) Nairobi City Thunder	**W** 104–91	Matchday 4	(Tunisia) US Monastir	**W** 78–68
(Rwanda) APR	**W** 106–102	Matchday 5	(Senegal) ASC Ville de Dakar	**W** 76–67
(South Africa) MBB	**W** 102–73	Matchday 6	(Cape Verde) Kriol Star	**L** 69–71 (OT)
Opponent	Agg.	Playoffs	Opponent	Agg.
(Egypt) Al Ittihad Alexandria	**L** 74–85	Seeding game	(Rwanda) APR	**L** 57–75
(Cape Verde) Kriol Star	**W** 107–81	Quarterfinals	(Tunisia) US Monastir	**W** 95–84
(Rwanda) APR	**W** 84–71	Semifinals	(Egypt) Al Ittihad Alexandria	**W** 96–74

=== Petro de Luanda ===
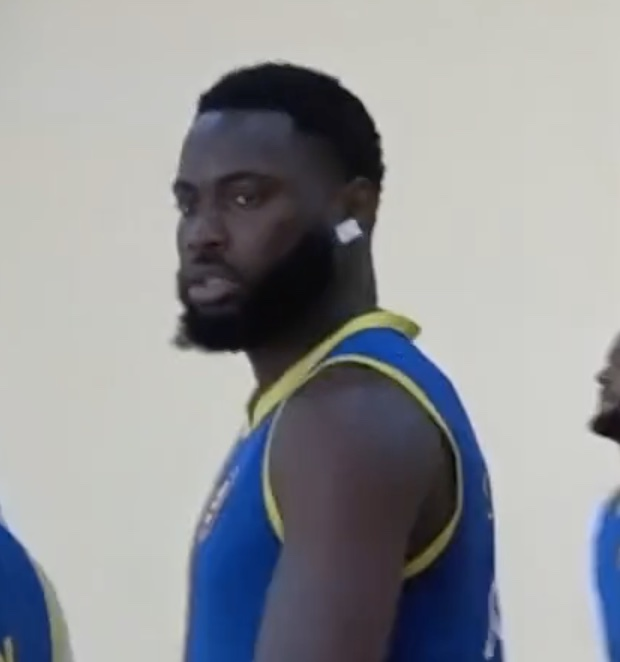
Aboubakar Gakou led Petro to another treble and won his third Angolan League MVP award

After the successful previous season, veteran Jone Pedro left the club (after 5 years), along with Gerson Gonçalves (after 9 years), who signed a contract in France. The team reinforced themselves with Solo Diabate, who returned after one season in Libya, and Patrick Gardner. The season began with the Supertaça de Angola on November 24, 2024; Petro won the cup for an eleventh time after easily defeating Interclube in the game.

In January 2025, Carlos Morais left the team after 22 seasons with Petro, when he signed with Interclube. They also signed Rigoberto Mendoza. Petro was allocated in the Sahara Conference, and thus played the group stage games in Dakar. They finished second behind US Monastir and qualified for the playoffs.

On April 11, Petro won its 15th Taça de Angola (Cup) title after crushing Vila Clotilde in the final game. With their victory they tied Primeiro de Agosto's record for most cup titles won. On May 12, 2025, Petro announced the signing of Samkelo Cele to the team. On May 30, 2025, Petro successfully defended its national title by defeating Primeiro de Agosto in the finals in five games. It was Petro's eighteenth title, and the sixth consecutive championship. It was the second team to win six straight titles, following Primeiro de Agosto's streak between 2000 and 2005. Aboubakar Gakou was named the Angolan League MVP for a third time.

== Game ==
14 June 2025	**Al Ahli Tripoli** (Libya)	**88**–67	(Angola) Petro de Luanda	Pretoria, South Africa
16:00	Scoring by quarter: 27–19, 16–19, 23–16, 22–13
	Pts: Marei 22; Rebs: Marei 19; Asts: Adams 7	Boxscore	Pts: Gakou 12; Rebs: Gardner 5 Asts: Dundão 8	Arena: SunBet Arena; Attendance: 6,853; Referees: Julian Scott, Yann Vezo Davidson, Annie Joyce Muchenu

Starters:			Pts	Reb	Ast
PG	2	(United States) Jaylen Adams	11	7	7
SF	4	(United States) Fabian White Jr.	18	9	0
SG	7	(Libya) Naseim Badrush	0	0	2
PG	13	(Libya) Mohamed Sadi	11	4	8
C	50	(Egypt) Assem Marei	22	19	3
Reserves:					
PG	5	(Senegal) Jean Jacques Boissy	12	1	2
SG	10	(Nigeria) Caleb Agada	10	2	4
PG	11	(Libya) Bakeer Fellah	0	0	0
C	12	(Nigeria) Emmanuel Onoja	0	1	0
SG	23	(Libya) Ahmed Alsawadiq	2	0	1
C	24	(Libya) Anees Almansouri	0	0	0
C	34	(Libya) Wajdi Dawo	2	0	0
PF	45	(Libya) Ali Abd Rahim	0	0	0
Head coach:
(Lebanon) Fouad Abou Chakra

**Al Ahli Tripoli**	**Petro de Luanda**

Al Ahli Tripoli	Statistics	Petro de Luanda
23/50 (46%)	2-pt field goals	17/37 (45%)
8/28 (28%)	3-pt field goals	8/22 (36%)
18/22 (81%)	Free throws	9/15 (60%)
25	Offensive rebounds	8
29	Defensive rebounds	22
54	Total rebounds	30
19	Assists	26
16	Turnovers	18
12	Steals	13
5	Blocks	5
19	Fouls	18

2025 BAL champions

**Al Ahli Tripoli**
1st BAL title; 1st continental title

Starters:			Pts	Reb	Ast
PG	5	(Angola) Childe Dundão	11	4	8
SG	12	(Dominican Republic) Rigoberto Mendoza	10	2	3
PF	14	(Angola) Clésio Castro	6	1	1
F	24	(Angola) Glofate Buiamba	2	1	0
F	28	(Egypt) Patrick Gardner	11	5	4
Reserves:					
PG	00	(Angola) Gerson Domingos	DNP		
SG	1	(Angola) Eduardo Simão	DNP		
C	2	(Angola) Yanick Moreira	1	4	2
SG	7	(United States) Kendrick Ray	8	2	1
PG	10	(Ivory Coast) Solo Diabate	4	1	4
SF	13	(Nigeria) Samson Mashebinu	DNP		
PF	15	(Angola) Aboubacar Gakou	12	2	2
SG	23	(South Africa) Samkelo Cele	2	0	1
Head coach:
(Spain) Sergio Valdeolmillos
