= 2025 BAL playoffs =

Playoffs of the 2025 BAL season

2025 BAL Playoffs
Tournament details
- Country: South Africa
- City: Pretoria
- Venue: SunBet Arena
- Dates: 6–14 June 2025
- Teams: 8

Tournament statistics
- Matches played: 12

The 2025 BAL playoffs will be the postseason tournament of the 2025 BAL season which determined the champions of the fifth Basketball Africa League (BAL) season. The playoffs will begin on 6 June 2025 with the seeding games and finish on 14 June 2025 with the final. The playoffs will be held in the SunBet Arena in Pretoria, South Africa.

== Qualified teams ==
Al Ahli Tripoli, Al Ittihad Alexandria and Kriol Star made their playoff debuts. Kriol Star became the first team from Cape Verde to qualify for the playoffs.

Team	Conference	Record	Clinched		Playoff appearance
Team	Conference	Record	Playoff berth	Best record in conference	Playoff appearance
(Egypt) Al Ittihad Alexandria	Kalahari	6–0	10 April	11 April	1st
(Nigeria) Rivers Hoopers	Kalahari	4–2	11 April	–	2nd
(Tunisia) US Monastitr	Sahara	4–2	4 May	4 May	4th
(Angola) Petro de Luanda	Sahara	3–3	3 May	–	5th
(Cape Verde) Kriol Star	Sahara	3–3	4 May	–	1st
(Libya) Al Ahli Tripoli	Nile	6–0	22 May	22 May	1st
(Rwanda) APR	Nile	3–3	25 May	–	1st
(Morocco) FUS Rabat	Kalahari	2–4	25 May	–	2nd

== Summary ==
=== Signings ===
During the break between the group phase and the playoffs, teams were allowed to sign new players.

- Jo Lual-Acuil, the Most Valuable Player in 2024, joined Al Ittihad Alexandria
- Omar Abada, a former All-BAL selection, joined FUS Rabat
- Samkelo Cele, a 2024 All-BAL First Team member, joined the defending champions Petro de Luanda
- Nuni Omot, a BAL champion and MVP in 2023 with Al Ahly, joined APR

== Ranking ==
To determine the match-ups in the seeding games, the eight teams were ranked based on their performance across group phase games.

Pos	Team	Pld	W	L	GF	GA	GD	PCT	Qualification
1	(Libya) Al Ahli Tripoli	6	6	0	604	498	+106	1.000	Qualification to 1st-2nd seed game
2	(Egypt) Al Ittihad Alexandria	6	6	0	526	428	+98	1.000	Qualification to 1st-2nd seed game
3	(Tunisia) US Monastir	6	4	2	478	444	+34	.667	Qualification to 3rd-4th seed game
4	(Nigeria) Rivers Hoopers	6	4	2	484	466	+18	.667	Qualification to 3rd-4th seed game
5	(Angola) Petro de Luanda	6	3	3	463	432	+31	.500	Qualification to 5th-6th seed game
6	(Rwanda) APR	6	3	3	530	508	+22	.500	Qualification to 5th-6th seed game
7	(Cape Verde) Kriol Star	6	3	3	461	506	−45	.500	Qualification to 7th-8th seed game
8	(Morocco) FUS Rabat	6	2	4	456	475	−19	.333	Qualification to 7th-8th seed game

Source: BAL
Rules for classification: Teams ranked on 1) Win-loss record; 2) Head-to-head record; 3) Point differential in the games between the respective teams; 4) Number of points scored in the games between the respective teams; 5) Average point differential in all games against other teams in the Conference; 6) Average number of points scored in all games played against other teams in the Conference; 7) Drawing.

== Seeding games ==
Note: All times are in East Africa Time.

7th–8th seed game

6 June 2025	Kriol Star (Cape Verde)	91–88	(Morocco) FUS Rabat	Pretoria, South Africa
16:00	Scoring by quarter: 19–20, 22–22, 21–26, 29–20
	Pts: Ntambwe 22; Rebs: Almedia 10; Asts: Almeida 4	Boxscore	Pts: Baeri 22; Rebs: Diagne 9 Asts: Jordan 8	Arena: SunBet Arena; Attendance: 1,613; Referees: Kenny Jones, Arnold Moseya, Annie Joyce Muchenu

1st–2nd seed game

6 June 2025	Al Ahli Tripoli (Libya)	74–85	(Egypt) Al Ittihad Alexandria	Pretoria, South Africa
19:00	Scoring by quarter: 14–24, 25–24, 16–16, 19–21
	Pts: White Jr. 24; Rebs: White Jr. 11; Asts: Badrush 5	Boxscore	Pts: Deng 19; Rebs: Lual-Acuil 14; Asts: Vinales 5	Arena: SunBet Arena; Attendance: 3,124; Referees: Julian Scott, Yann Vezo Davidson, Kingsley Ojeaburu

5th–6th seed game

7 June 2025	Petro de Luanda (Angola)	57–75	(Rwanda) APR	Pretoria, South Africa
16:00	Scoring by quarter: 19–11, 14–26, 13–24, 11–24
	Pts: Gardner 13; Rebs: Gardner 10; Asts: Ray 5	Boxscore	Pts: Diarra 19; Rebs: Diarra 16; Asts: Habimana 5	Arena: SunBet Arena; Attendance: 4,190; Referees: Chelisa Painter, Amr Aboollo, Amir Taboubi

3rd–4th seed game

7 June 2025	US Monastir (Tunisia)	89–81	(Nigeria) Rivers Hoopers	Pretoria, South Africa
19:00	Scoring by quarter: 14–16, 18–20, 34–26, 23–19
	Pts: Sané 22; Rebs: Lahyani 7 Asts: Hardy 9	Boxscore	Pts: Putney 28; Rebs: Olisemeka 10; Asts: Maxi Munanga 4	Arena: SunBet Arena; Attendance: 5,052; Referees: Pat O'Connell, Jean Sauveur Ruhamiriza, Oumar Sy

== Bracket ==
The playoff pairings were determined by the seeding games.

Quarterfinals
1	(Egypt) Al Ittihad Alexandria (OT)	86
8	(Morocco) FUS Rabat	83
3	(Tunisia) US Monastir	84
6	(Angola) Petro de Luanda	95
2	(Libya) Al Ahli Tripoli	107
7	(Cape Verde) Kriol Star	81
4	(Nigeria) Rivers Hoopers	73
5	(Rwanda) APR	104

Semifinals
1	(Egypt) Al Ittihad Alexandria	74
6	(Angola) Petro de Luanda	96
2	(Libya) Al Ahli Tripoli	84
5	(Rwanda) APR	71

Final
6	(Angola) Petro de Luanda	67
2	(Libya) Al Ahli Tripoli	88
Third place game
1	(Egypt) Al Ittihad Alexandria	90
5	(Rwanda) APR	123

== Quarterfinals ==
=== (2) Al Ahli Tripoli vs. (7) Kriol Star ===
It was the first official BAL game between the teams, however, they had met once in the Road to BAL group stage in November, in a game which Al Ahli won. Fabian White Jr. led the Libyans with 34 points and 13 rebounds, and an efficiency of 39. Assem Marei contributed a double-double of 13 points and 13 rebounds. On the losing side, Joel Ntambwe led all Kriol Star scorers with 25. The Al Ahli bench outscored Kriol Star's bench 26–3 in the game. Al Ahli became the second Libyan team to reach the semifinals, following Al Ahly Ly in the previous season.

8 June 2025	Al Ahli Tripoli (Libya)	107–81	(Cape Verde) Kriol Star	Pretoria, South Africa
16:00	Scoring by quarter: 29–18, 25–22, 29–14, 24–27
	Pts: White Jr. 34; Rebs: Marei, White Jr. 13; Asts: Badrush 7	Boxscore	Pts: Ntambwe 25; Rebs: I. Almeida 8 Asts: I. Almeida 6	Arena: SunBet Arena; Attendance: 2,537; Referees: Julian Scott, Amr Aboollo, Asmae Benkhadra

=== (1) Al Ittihad Alexandria vs. (8) FUS Rabat ===
This was the third game this season between these two teams, who faced each other twice in the Kalahari Conference. FUS Rabat guard Nisre Zouzoua hit a sidestep three-pointer with two seconds on the clock to tie the game at 74–74, and which eventually sent the game to overtime. In the overtime, FUS shot two-for-seven from the field, and three-from-eight from the free throw line, as Al Ittihad pulled through to advance to the semifinals. Jo Lual-Acuil had his second double-double of the playoffs with 16 points and 11 rebounds, while Kyle Vinales also contributed 16 points. Majok Deng added 15 points from the bench. For the losing side John Jordan led all scorers with 23 points, while

8 June 2025	Al Ittihad Alexandria (Egypt)	86–83(OT)	(Morocco) FUS Rabat	Pretoria, South Africa
19:00	Scoring by quarter: 16–14, 25–20, 15–16, 18–24, Overtime: 12–9
	Pts: Lual-Acuil, Vinales 16; Rebs: Lual-Acuil 11; Asts: Vinales 7	Boxscore	Pts: Jordan 23; Rebs: Kourdou 8 Asts: Abada 6	Arena: SunBet Arena; Attendance: 3,123; Referees: Kenny Jones, Oumar Sy, Claudio Eiuba

=== (4) Rivers Hoopers vs. (5) APR ===
This was the third game in BAL history between the Rivers Hoopers and APR, who played each other twice in the 2024 Sahara Conference. APR led from start to finish and dominated the Hoopers, and thus became the second team to advance to the BAL semifinals, following Patriots in 2021.

9 June 2025	Rivers Hoopers (Nigeria)	73–104	(Rwanda) APR	Pretoria, South Africa
16:00	Scoring by quarter: 11–24, 21–33, 20–26, 21–21
	Pts: Akec 21; Rebs: Garba, Olisemeka 7 Asts: Akec 4	Boxscore	Pts: Omot 21; Rebs: Diarra 9 Asts: Randle 10	Arena: SunBet Arena; Attendance: 1,803; Referees: Pat O'Connell, Arnold Moseya, Amir Taboubi

=== (3) US Monastir vs. (6) Petro de Luanda ===
The quarterfinal was a rematch of the 2022 BAL finals, in which Monastir won its first BAL title, as well as the fourth BAL game between the two teams. In the end of the opening quarter, Petro went on a 12–0 run to finish the quarter 28–16, after which US Monastir never led. Petro de Luanda qualified for the BAL semifinals for a record-extending fifth time in a row. Monastir was eliminated in the quarterfinals for a second year in a row.

9 June 2025	US Monastir (Tunisia)	84–95	(Angola) Petro de Luanda	Pretoria, South Africa
19:00	Scoring by quarter: 16–28, 26–22, 18–29, 24–16
	Pts: Hardy 17; Rebs: Eldridge 8 Asts: Eldridge 5	Boxscore	Pts: Ray 20; Rebs: Gardner 6 Asts: Dundão, Gardner 6	Arena: SunBet Arena; Attendance: 2,213; Referees: Chelisa Painter, Kingsley Ojeaburu, Jean Sauveur Ruhamiriza

== Semifinals ==
=== (2) Al Ahli Tripoli vs. (4) APR ===
This was the third game between both teams of the season,. Fabian White Jr. played all 40 minutes of the game, and led Al Ahli with 23 points, on 9-for-14 shooting, while also grabbing 7 rebounds. Al Ahli Tripoli became the second Libyan team to reach the BAL final, following Al Ahly Ly in the previous year.

11 June 2025	Al Ahli Tripoli (Libya)	84–71	(Rwanda) APR	Pretoria, South Africa
16:00	Scoring by quarter: 17–18, 19–11, 19–28, 29–14
	Pts: White Jr. 23; Rebs: Marei 10; Asts: Adams, Marei 6	Boxscore	Pts: Omot 22; Rebs: Diarra 9 Asts: Randle 4	Arena: SunBet Arena; Attendance: 2,928; Referees: Chelisa Painter, Yann Vezo Davidson, Amr Aboollo

=== (2) Al Ittihad Alexandria vs. (6) Petro de Luanda ===
The defending champions Petro de Luanda ended Al Ittihad's unbeaten run, handing them their first loss of the season and eliminating them from title contention. The Angolans took a lead in the first quarter, and led as much as by 25 points at one point in the game. Al Ittihad struggled from behind the arc, shooting 5-for-26 from three-point range. Petro de Luanda's bench was also superior, outscoring Al Ittihad 60–35. Kendrick Ray led all players in scoring with 21 points. Petro qualified for its second straight final appearance.

11 June 2025	Al Ittihad Alexandria (Egypt)	74–96	(Angola) Petro de Luanda	Pretoria, South Africa
19:00	Scoring by quarter: 22–25, 18–20, 12–22, 22–29
	Pts: Deng 17; Rebs: Lual-Acuil 7 Asts: Lual-Acuil 7	Boxscore	Pts: Ray 21; Rebs: Gardner 12; Asts: Diabate 7	Arena: SunBet Arena; Attendance: 4,615; Referees: Pat O'connell, Arnold Moseya, Jean Sauveur Ruhamiriza

== Third place game: (1) Al Ittihad Alexandria vs. (4) APR ==
APR dominated the third place game against Al Ittihad, scoring a league record 123 points in the game, breaking the record which was set by Al Ahli Tripoli in the regular season. They also scored 74 points by halftime, the most in league history, and set a new record for most points in an opening quarter, with 38. APR made 16 three-pointers, also setting a new league record. Forward Axel Mpoyo hit 10 three-pointers, and set a new record for most three-point field goals by a player in a BAL game, overtaking the record set by Will Perry. The third place by APR was the best result by any Rwandan team, matching the performance by Patriots who were fourth in 2021. Al Ittihad's finish in fourth place was the second-worst result by an Egyptian team since the establishment of the league.

13 June 2025	Al Ittihad Alexandria (Egypt)	90–123	(Rwanda) APR	Pretoria, South Africa
19:00	Scoring by quarter: 19–38, 15–36, 22–17, 34–32
	Pts: Mohamed 20; Rebs: M. Deng 9 Asts: Aboushousha 6	Boxscore	Pts: Mpoyo 32; Rebs: Diarra 10; Asts: Nshobozwabyosenumukiza 10	Arena: SunBet Arena; Attendance: 5,603; Referees: Ken Jones, Oumar Sy, Asmae Benkhadra

== Final: (2) Al Ahli Tripoli vs. (6) Petro de Luanda ==
14 June 2025	Al Ahli Tripoli (Libya)	88–67	(Angola) Petro de Luanda	Pretoria, South Africa
16:00	Scoring by quarter: 27–19, 16–19, 23–16, 22–13
	Pts: Marei 22; Rebs: Marei 19; Asts: Adams 7	Boxscore	Pts: Gakou 12; Rebs: Gardner 5 Asts: Dundão 8	Arena: SunBet Arena; Attendance: 6,853; Referees: Julian Scott, Yann Vezo Davidson, Annie Joyce Muchenu
