= 2024–25 Petro de Luanda basketball season =

Petro de Luanda
- Chairman: Tomás Faria
- Head coach: Sergio Valdeolmillos (2nd season)
- BAL: Runners-up (defeated by Al Ahli Tripoli)
- Unitel Basket: Champions (defeated Primeiro de Agosto)
- Angolan Cup: Winners (defeated Vila Clotilde)
- Angolan Supercup: Winners (defeated Interclube)

Petro de Luanda plays the 2024–25 season in the Angolan Basketball League and the Basketball Africa League (BAL), as well as in two national cup competitions.

This season was the first without Carlos Morais, whose 22-year tenure with Petro ended when he signed with rivals Interclube. Other notable players who left were Jone Pedro (after 5 years) and Gerson Gonçalves (after nine years).

Petro successfully defended its national title by defeating Primeiro de Agosto in the finals in five games. It was the eighteenth title of Petro, and the sixth consecutive championship. It was the second team to win six straight titles, following Primeiro de Agosto's streak between 2000 and 2005. They also won the Angolan Cup and Super Cup, successfully completing the national treble.

In the BAL season, Petro reached a second straight BAL finals, but lost to Al Ahli Tripoli.

== Overview ==
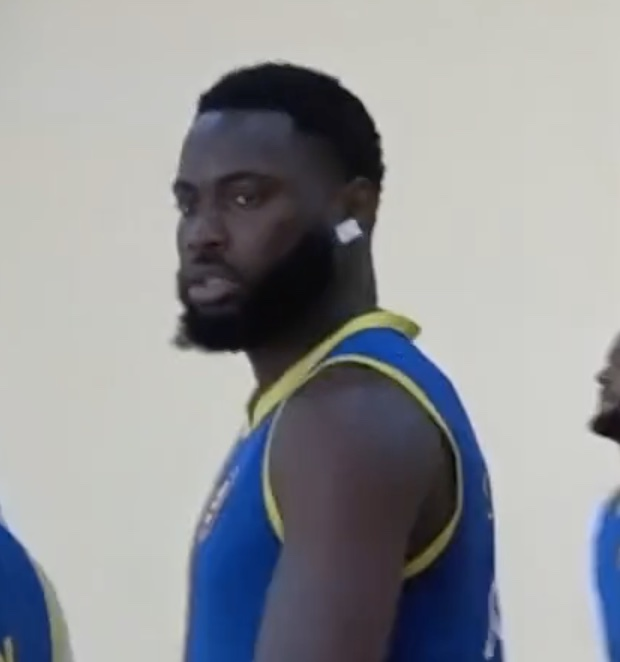
Aboubakar Gakou led Petro to another treble and won his third Angolan League MVP award

After the successful previous season, veteran Jone Pedro left the club (after 5 years), along with Gerson Gonçalves (after 9 years), who signed a contract in France. The team reinforced themselves with Solo Diabate, who returned after one season in Libya, and Patrick Gardner. The season began with the Supertaça de Angola on November 24, 2024; Petro won the cup for an eleventh time after easily defeating Interclube in the game.

In January 2025, Carlos Morais left the team after 22 seasons with Petro, when he signed with Interclube. They also signed Rigoberto Mendoza.

Petro was allocated in the Sahara Conference, and thus played the group stage games in Dakar. They finished second behind US Monastir and qualified for the playoffs.

On April 11, Petro won its 15th Taça de Angola (Cup) title after crushing Vila Clotilde in the final game. With their victory they tied Primeiro de Agosto's record for most cup titles won. On May 12, 2025, Petro announced the signing of Samkelo Cele to the team.

On May 30, 2025, Petro successfully defended its national title by defeating Primeiro de Agosto in the finals in five games. It was Petro's eighteenth title, and the sixth consecutive championship. It was the second team to win six straight titles, following Primeiro de Agosto's streak between 2000 and 2005. As winners, Petro qualified directly for the 2026 BAL season. Aboubakar Gakou was named the Angolan League MVP for a third time, becoming the third player to win three or more awards, joining Eduardo Mingas and Olímpio Cipriano.

== Roster ==
Note: Flags indicate national team eligibility at FIBA-sanctioned events. Players may hold other non-FIBA nationalities not displayed.

Petro de Luanda roster
Players
Coaches

| Pos. | No. | Nat. | Name | Ht. | Age |
|---|---|---|---|---|---|
| PG | 00 | (Angola) | Domingos, Gerson | 1.74 m (5 ft 9 in) | 30 – 16 April 1996 |
| PG | 1 | (Angola) | Simão, Eduardo | 1.98 m (6 ft 6 in) | 22 – 6 February 2004 |
| PG | 2 | (Angola) | Moreira, Yanick | 2.11 m (6 ft 11 in) | 35 – 31 July 1991 |
| PG | 5 | (Angola) | Dundão, Childe | 1.72 m (5 ft 8 in) | 28 – 17 May 1998 |
| G | 10 | (Ivory Coast) | Diabate, Solo (I) | 1.83 m (6 ft 0 in) | 39 – 21 July 1987 |
| G | 12 | (Dominican Republic) | Mendoza, Rigoberto (I) | 1.91 m (6 ft 3 in) | 34 – 6 July 1992 |
| F/C | 13 | (Angola) | Castro, Clesio | 1.98 m (6 ft 6 in) | 29 – 22 February 1997 |
| SF | 13 | (Nigeria) | Mashebinu, Samson (E) | 1.98 m (6 ft 6 in) | 19 – 27 August 2007 |
| F | 15 | (Angola) | Gakou, Aboubakar | 2.02 m (6 ft 8 in) | 29 – 27 May 1997 |
| SG | 23 | (South Africa) | Cele, Samkelo (I) | 1.94 m (6 ft 4 in) | 28 – 28 December 1997 |
| SF | 24 | (Angola) | Buiamba, Glofate | 2.00 m (6 ft 7 in) | 27 – 5 January 1999 |
| F | 28 | (Egypt) | Gardner, Patrick (I) | 2.11 m (6 ft 11 in) | 27 – 16 June 1999 |
| F | 34 | (Nigeria) | Anosike, EJ (I) | 2.00 m (6 ft 7 in) | 27 – 11 November 1998 |
| C | 45 | (Angola) | Manuel, Keneth | 2.11 m (6 ft 11 in) | 27 – 28 May 1999 |

Head coach

- (Spain) Sergio Valdeolmillos

Assistant coach(es)

- (Angola) Raúl Duarte

Legend

- (C) Team captain
- (I) Import player
- Injured

- Roster
Updated: June 6, 2025

== Transactions ==
=== In ===
| No. | Pos. | Nat. | Name | Age | Moving from | | Date | Source |
|---|---|---|---|---|---|---|---|---|
| 00 | G | (Ivory Coast) | Solo Diabate | 36 | Al Ahli Benghazi | (Libya) | 10 August 2024 | |
| 4 | C | (Egypt) | Patrick Gardner | 28 | Al Ahly | (Egypt) | August 25, 2024 | |
| 26 | G | (Dominican Republic) | Rigoberto Mendoza | 32 | Astros de Jalisco | (Mexico) | January 13, 2025 | |
| | G/F | (South Africa) | Samkelo Cele | 26 | Real Valladolid | (Spain) | May 12, 2025 | |

=== Out ===
| No. | Pos. | Nat. | Name | Age | Moving to | | Type | Date | Source |
|---|---|---|---|---|---|---|---|---|---|
| 7 | C | (Angola) | Jone Pedro | 34 | | | End of contract | 10 August 2024 | |
| 10 | G | (Angola) | Gerson Gonçalves | 28 | Aix Maurienne | (France) | End of contract | 16 July 2024 | |
| 10 | SF | (Angola) | Carlos Morais | 38 | Interclube | (Angola) | End of contract | January 2025 | |

== Competitions ==
=== Friendly ===
Petro spent their pre-season in Spain, where they participated in a local tournament, to prepare for the 2024 FIBA Intercontinental Cup.

| 28 August 2024 | Coviran Granada (Spain) | 80–67 | (Angola) Petro de Luanda | Granada, Spain |
| | Pts: Bamforth 14 | Reference | Pts: Gardner 11 | Attendance: 6,000 |

=== FIBA Intercontinental Cup ===
==== Group phase ====
| 12 September | Petro de Luanda (Angolan Basketball Federation) | 78–94 | (Spanish Basketball Federation) Unicaja | Singapore |
| 20:00 | Scoring by quarter: 6–25, 26–30, 20–20, 26–19 |
| | Pts: Castro 13; Rebs: Castro 9 Asts: Diabate, Domingos 6 | Box score | Pts: Kalinoski 16; Rebs: Osetkowski 8 Asts: Osetkowski 7 | Arena: Singapore Indoor Stadium; Attendance: 1,627; Referees: Johnny Batista (PUR), Carlos Peralta (ECU), James Alexander Boyer (AUS) |

| 14 September | Petro de Luanda (Angolan Basketball Federation) | 75–80 | (Lebanese Basketball Federation) Al Riyadi | Singapore |
| 16:00 | Scoring by quarter: 21–23, 14–11, 16–28, 24–18 |
| | Pts: Gakou 20; Rebs: Diabate 8 Asts: Diabate 7 | Box score | Pts: Harris 22; Rebs: Gyokchyan 10; Asts: Gyokchyan 6 | Arena: Singapore Indoor Stadium; Attendance: 2,925; Referees: Johnny Batista (PUR), Yann Vezo Davidson (MAD), James Alexander Boyer (AUS) |

==== 5th-6th place classification game ====
| 15 September | Petro de Luanda (Angolan Basketball Federation) | 70–64 | (Argentine Basketball Confederation) Quimsa | Singapore |
| 13:00 | Scoring by quarter: 11–24, 24–9, 16–22, 19–9 |
| | Pts: Gakou 20; Rebs: Gardner 10; Asts: Diabate 6 | Boxscore | Pts: Romano 13; Rebs: Miller, Brussino 6 Asts: Brussino 8 | Arena: Singapore Indoor Stadium; Attendance: 3,173; Referees: Johnny Batista (PUR), Ariadna Chueca (ESP), Yann Vezo Davidson (MAD) |

=== BAL ===
==== Sahara Conference ====
| Pos | Team | Pld | W | L | PF | PA | PD | PCT | Qualification |
|---|---|---|---|---|---|---|---|---|---|
| 1 | (Tunisia) US Monastir | 6 | 4 | 2 | 478 | 444 | +34 | .667 | Advance to playoffs |
| 2 | (Angola) Petro de Luanda | 6 | 3 | 3 | 463 | 432 | +31 | .500 (Note: Head-to-head: Petro de Luanda 1–1 Kriol Star, +26 point differential.) | Advance to playoffs |
| 3 | (Cape Verde) Kriol Star | 6 | 3 | 3 | 461 | 506 | −45 | .500 | Advance to playoffs |
| 4 | (Senegal) ASC Ville de Dakar (H) | 6 | 2 | 4 | 425 | 445 | −20 | .333 | |

Source: BAL
Rules for classification: Tiebreakers
(H) Hosts
Notes:

| 26 April 2025 1 | Kriol Star (Cape Verde) | 74–103 | (Angola) Petro de Luanda | Dakar, Senegal |
| 14:30 | Scoring by quarter: 14–24, 16–21, 21–26, 33–32 |
| | Pts: Pack 17; Rebs: Mendes 7 Asts: Parker 7 | Boxscore | Pts: Gakou 19; Rebs: Moreira 8 Asts: Dundão 13 | Arena: Dakar Arena; Attendance: 2,305; Referees: Nate Cearley, Mbaye Seye, Haytham Ihaqaf |

| 27 April 2025 2 | US Monastir (Tunisia) | 87–73 | (Angola) Petro de Luanda | Dakar, Senegal |
| 14:30 | Scoring by quarter: 22–17, 23–29, 17–22, 11–19 |
| | Pts: Sané 24; Rebs: Lahyani 9 Asts: Sayeh 5 | Boxscore | Pts: Anosike 16; Rebs: Moreira 9 Asts: Dundão 6 | Arena: Dakar Arena; Attendance: 1,768; Referees: Amr Aboolo, Kingsley Ojeaburu, Annie Joyce Muchenu |

| 29 April 2025 3 | ASC Ville de Dakar (Senegal) | 65–64 | (Angola) Petro de Luanda | Dakar, Senegal |
| 19:00 | Scoring by quarter: 18–16, 15–21, 19–13, 13–14 |
| | Pts: Gueye 16; Rebs: Gueye, Ndiaye 11; Asts: three players 4 | Boxscore | Pts: Gardner 19; Rebs: Gardner 10; Asts: Dundão, Moreira 5 | Arena: Dakar Arena; Attendance: 4,556; Referees: Nate Cearley, Aboollo Amr, Annie Joyce Muchenu |

| 1 May 2025 4 | Petro de Luanda (Angola) | 78–68 | (Tunisia) US Monastir | Dakar, Senegal |
| 14:30 | Scoring by quarter: 16–16, 14–21, 20–13, 28–18 |
| | Pts: Mendoza 21; Rebs: Mendoza 11; Asts: Mendoza 4 | Boxscore | Pts: Hardy 16; Rebs: Lahyani 9 Asts: Eldridge 4 | Arena: Dakar Arena; Attendance: 2,304; Referees: Evans Kastine, Ojeaburu Kingsley, Seye Mbaye |

| 3 May 2025 5 | Petro de Luanda (Angola) | 76–67 | (Senegal) ASC Ville de Dakar | Dakar, Senegal |
| 17:30 | Scoring by quarter: 25–18, 22–14, 16–22, 13–14 |
| | Pts: Mendoza 14; Rebs: Moreira 10; Asts: Domingos 5 | Boxscore | Pts: Perry 18; Rebs: Daly Fall 13; Asts: Daly Fall 6 | Arena: Dakar Arena; Attendance: 9,250; Referees: Kastine Evans, Kalume Tonton Banza, Annie Joyce Muchenu |

| 4 May 2025 6 | Kriol Star (Cape Verde) | 71–69(OT) | (Angola) Petro de Luanda | Dakar, Senegal |
| 14:30 | Scoring by quarter: 20–7, 20–12, 13–18, 9–25, Overtime: 9–7 |
| | Pts: Correia 16; Rebs: Almeida 13; Asts: Almeida 8 | Boxscore | Pts: Buiamba 16; Rebs: Gardner 9 Asts: Diabate 9 | Arena: Dakar Arena |

==== Playoffs ====
===== Seeding game =====
| 7 June 2025 | Petro de Luanda (Angola) | 57–75 | (Rwanda) APR | Pretoria, South Africa |
| 16:00 | Scoring by quarter: 19–11, 14–26, 13–24, 11–24 |
| | Pts: Gardner 13; Rebs: Gardner 10; Asts: Ray 5 | Boxscore | Pts: Diarra 19; Rebs: Diarra 16; Asts: Habimana 5 | Arena: SunBet Arena; Attendance: 4,190; Referees: Chelisa Painter, Amr Aboollo, Amir Taboubi |

===== Quarterfinals =====
| 9 June 2025 | US Monastir (Tunisia) | 84–95 | (Angola) Petro de Luanda | Pretoria, South Africa |
| 19:00 | Scoring by quarter: 16–28, 16–22, 18–29, 24–16 |
| | Pts: Hardy 17; Rebs: Eldridge 8 Asts: Eldridge 5 | Boxscore | Pts: Ray 20; Rebs: Gardner 6 Asts: Dundão, Gardner 6 | Arena: SunBet Arena; Attendance: 2,213; Referees: Chelisa Painter, Kingsley Ojeaburu, Jean Sauveur Ruhamiriza |

===== Semifinals =====
| 11 June 2025 | Al Ittihad Alexandria (Egypt) | 74–96 | (Angola) Petro de Luanda | Pretoria, South Africa |
| 19:00 | Scoring by quarter: 22–25, 18–20, 12–22, 22–29 |
| | Pts: Deng 17; Rebs: Lual-Acuil 7 Asts: Lual-Acuil 7 | Boxscore | Pts: Ray 21; Rebs: Gardner 12; Asts: Diabate 7 | Arena: SunBet Arena; Attendance: 4,615; Referees: Pat O'connell, Arnold Moseya, Jean Sauveur Ruhamiriza |

===== Final =====
| 14 June 2025 | Al Ahli Tripoli (Libya) | 88–67 | (Angola) Petro de Luanda | Pretoria, South Africa |
| 16:00 | Scoring by quarter: 27–19, 16–19, 23–16, 22–13 |
| | Pts: Marei 22; Rebs: Marei 19; Asts: Adams 7 | Boxscore | Pts: Gakou 12; Rebs: Gardner 5 Asts: Dundão 8 | Arena: SunBet Arena; Attendance: 6,853; Referees: Julian Scott, Yann Vezo Davidson, Annie Joyce Muchenu |
