= 2022–23 Petro de Luanda basketball season =

Petro de Luanda
- Chairman: Tomás Faria
- Head coach: José Neto (3rd season)
- BAL: Third place
- Unitel Basket: Champions
- Angolan Cup: Winners
- Angolan Supercup: Winners

Petro de Luanda plays the 2023–24 season in the Angolan Basketball League and the Basketball Africa League (BAL) for a third straight season, as well as in two national cup competitions.

It was the third season under head coach José Neto. Domestically, Petro won the treble of the Unitel Basket, Angolan Cup and Supercup.

In the 2023 BAL season, Petro de Luanda were eliminated from title contention by AS Douanes in the semi-final. They lost the third place game to Stade Malien from Mali.

== Roster ==
Note: Flags indicate national team eligibility at FIBA-sanctioned events. Players may hold other non-FIBA nationalities not displayed.

Petro de Luanda roster
Players
Coaches

| Pos. | No. | Nat. | Name | Ht. | Age |
|---|---|---|---|---|---|
| PG | 0 | (Ivory Coast) | Diabate, Solo (I) | 1.83 m (6 ft 0 in) | 39 – 21 July 1987 |
| PG | 1 | (Angola) | Domingos, Gerson | 1.78 m (5 ft 10 in) | 30 – 16 April 1996 |
| PF | 2 | (Angola) | Chime, Anadji | | 21 – 5 September 2005 |
| SF | 4 | (Angola) | Bastos, Pedro | 1.92 m (6 ft 4 in) | 33 – 8 January 1993 |
| PG | 5 | (Angola) | Dundão, Childe | 1.68 m (5 ft 6 in) | 28 – 17 May 1998 |
| SG | 6 | (Angola) | Morais, Carlos (C) | 1.92 m (6 ft 4 in) | 40 – 16 October 1985 |
| C | 7 | (Angola) | Pedro, Jone | 2.08 m (6 ft 10 in) | 36 – 28 May 1990 |
| CG | 10 | (Angola) | Gonçalves, Gerson | 1.96 m (6 ft 5 in) | 30 – 29 March 1996 |
| C | 13 | (South Sudan) | Majok, Ater (I) | 2.10 m (6 ft 11 in) | 39 – 4 July 1987 |
| PF | 15 | (Angola) | Gakou, Aboubakar | 2.02 m (6 ft 8 in) | 29 – 27 May 1997 |
| G | 23 | (Egypt) | Hendawy, Seifeldin (E) | 2.01 m (6 ft 7 in) | 21 – 5 September 2005 |
| PF | 24 | (Angola) | Buiamba, Glofate | 2.00 m (6 ft 7 in) | 27 – 5 January 1999 |
| F | 45 | (Hungary) | Hollis, Damian (I) | 2.03 m (6 ft 8 in) | 38 – 19 August 1988 |

Head coach

- (Brazil) José Neto

Assistant coach(es)

- (Angola) Raùl Duarte
- (Angola) Víctor de Carvalho

Legend

- (C) Team captain
- Injured

- Roster
Updated: September 25, 2023

== Transactions ==
| No. | Pos. | Nat. | Name | Age | Moving from | | Type | Ends | Date | Source |
|---|---|---|---|---|---|---|---|---|---|---|
| 24 | F | (Angola) | Glofate Buiamba | 23 | Interclube | (Angola) | Free agent | Undisclosed | | |
| 23 | G | (Egypt) | Seifeldin Hendawy | 16 | NBA Academy Africa | (Senegal) | Drafted | Undisclosed | | |
| 0 | G | (Ivory Coast) | Solo Diabate | 16 | US Monastir | (Tunisia) | Free agent | Undisclosed | September 23, 2022 | |
| F | 88 | (Hungary) | Damian Hollis | 33 | Free agent | | Free agent | Undisclosed | January 4, 2023 | |
| 13 | C | (South Sudan) | Ater Majok | 35 | Piratas de La Guaira | (Venezuela) | Free agent | Undisclosed | March 10, 2023 | |

== Competitions ==
=== BAL ===
==== Nile Conference ====
| 27 April 2023 1 | Petro de Luanda (Angola) | 89–71 | (Uganda) City Oilers | 6th of October, Egypt |
| 20:30 | Scoring by quarter: 21–14, 21–25, 24–20, 23–12 |
| | Pts: Gakou 16; Rebs: Hollis 10; Asts: Majok 5 | RealGM Report | Pts: Jones 22; Rebs: Justice Jr., Roebuck Jr. 8 Asts: Justice Jr. 5 | Arena: Hassan Moustafa Sports Hall; Attendance: 657 |

| 29 April 2023 2 | Ferroviário da Beira (Mozambique) | 76–101 | (Angola) Petro de Luanda | 6th of October, Egypt |
| 16:00 | Scoring by quarter: 11–21, 28–26, 17–31, 20–23 |
| | Pts: Young 17; Rebs: Gueye 6 Asts: Perry 6 | Livestats | Pts: Morais 18; Rebs: Hollis 6 Asts: Gonçalves 5 | Arena: Hassan Moustafa Sports Hall; Attendance: N/A; Referees: Ian McClenny, Wael Ibrahim Mostafa, Aya Ahmed |

| 30 April 2023 3 | Petro de Luanda (Angola) | 87–48 | (South Africa) Cape Town Tigers | 6th of October, Egypt |
| 20:30 | Scoring by quarter: 28–12, 20–12, 26–9, 13–15 |
| | Pts: Gonçalves 15; Rebs: Gonçalves 9 Asts: Four players 4 | Livestats | Pts: Hall 14; Rebs: Gbinije 8 Asts: Hall, Wade 3 | Arena: Hassan Moustafa Sports Hall; Attendance: 883; Referees: Tyler Ricks, Mbaye Seye, Jean Sauveur Ruhamiriza |

| 3 May 2023 4 | SLAC (Guinea) | 78–95 | (Angola) Petro de Luanda | 6th of October, Egypt |
| 17:00 | Scoring by quarter: 20–22, 21–34, 17–23, 20–16 |
| | Pts: Miller Jr. 24; Rebs: Conde 12; Asts: Miller Jr. 7 | BAL Report | Pts: Majok 15; Rebs: Hollis 10; Asts: Diabate 7 | Arena: Hassan Moustafa Sports Hall; Attendance: 500; Referees: Tyler Mirkovich, Marie Cherubin, Walelign Gebeto |

| 5 May 2023 5 | Petro de Luanda (Angola) | 91–90 | (Egypt) Al Ahly | 6th of October, Egypt |
| 19:30 | Scoring by quarter: 26–18, 21–25, 24–26, 20–21 |
| | Pts: Morais 34; Rebs: Morais 6 Asts: Majok 5 | BAL Report | Pts: Omot 25; Rebs: Ismail 7 Asts: Webster 8 | Arena: Hassan Moustafa Sports Hall; Attendance: 3,015; Referees: Tyler Ricks, Mbaye Seye, Annie Joyce Muchenu |

==== Playoffs ====
| 22 May 2023 Quarter-final | Petro de Luanda (Angola) | 88–84 | (Ivory Coast) ABC Fighters | Kigali, Rwanda |
| 20:30 | Scoring by quarter: 23–16, 18–25, 23–22, 24–21 |
| | Pts: Morais 18; Rebs: Pedro 8 Asts: Diabate 5 | Report; Livestats | Pts: Abada 21; Rebs: Three players 3 Asts: Abada 8 | Arena: BK Arena; Referees: Klyde Mulla, Yann Vezo Davidson, Mbaye Seye |

| 24 May 2023 Semi-final | Petro de Luanda (Angola) | 86–92 | (Senegal) AS Douanes | Kigali, Rwanda |
| 17:00 | Scoring by quarter: 19–20, 26–29, 18–20, 23–23 |
| | Pts: Hollis 19; Rebs: Pedro 8 Asts: Pedro 6 | Livestats | Pts: Boissy 28; Rebs: Crawford 7 Asts: Ndour 5 | Arena: BK Arena; Attendance: 4,554; Referees: Marcy Williams, Jean Sauveur Ruhamiriza, Mbaye Seye |

| 26 May 2023 Third place game | Petro de Luanda (Angola) | 65–73 | (Mali) Stade Malien | Kigali, Rwanda |
| 18:00 | Scoring by quarter: 15–20, 19–16, 20–14, 11–23 |
| | Pts: Morais 15; Rebs: Morais 9 Asts: Morais, Diabate 4 | Livestats | Pts: Diarra 25; Rebs: Diarra 12; Asts: Three players 5 | Arena: BK Arena; Referees: Hortensia Sanchez-Carrizales, Marie Leslie Cherubin, Mbaye Seye |

== BAL player statistics ==
Legend
| GP | Games played | GS | Games started | MPG | Minutes per game |
| FG% | Field-goal percentage | 3P% | 3-point field-goal percentage | FT% | Free-throw percentage |
| RPG | Rebounds per game | APG | Assists per game | SPG | Steals per game |
| BPG | Blocks per game | PPG | Points per game |

After all games.

Petro de Luanda statistics
| Player | GP | MPG | FG% | 3FG% | FT% | RPG | APG | SPG | BPG | PPG |
|---|---|---|---|---|---|---|---|---|---|---|
| Carlos Morais | 8 | 27.5 | .442 | .413 | .789 | 4.4 | 3.3 | 0.8 | 0.0 | 15.6 |
| Damian Hollis | 8 | 21.5 | .478 | .474 | .944 | 6.9 | 1.4 | 0.6 | 0.3 | 11.3 |
| Childe Dundão | 8 | 22.6 | .394 | .400 | .750 | 2.5 | 2.5 | 1.5 | 0.0 | 10.6 |
| Jone Pedro | 8 | 18.7 | .674 | .000 | .593 | 5.4 | 1.5 | 0.1 | 0.8 | 9.3 |
| Gerson Gonçalves | 8 | 23.4 | .520 | .375 | .750 | 3.9 | 3.4 | 1.3 | 0.0 | 9.1 |
| Ater Majok | 8 | 20.9 | .522 | .000 | .696 | 5.8 | 2.5 | 0.4 | 1.6 | 8.0 |
| Solo Diabate | 8 | 21.0 | .391 | .294 | 1.000 | 3.1 | 4.5 | 1.0 | 0.1 | 7.1 |
| Aboubakar Gakou | 8 | 18.8 | .360 | .314 | .727 | 3.8 | 0.8 | 0.6 | 0.3 | 6.9 |
| Glofate Buiamba | 7 | 9.8 | .519 | .000 | .875 | 1.9 | 0.4 | 0.6 | 0.1 | 5.0 |
| Gerson Domingos | 8 | 8.3 | .455 | .357 | .500 | 0.8 | 1.1 | 0.1 | 0.0 | 3.5 |
| Pedro Bastos | 6 | 8.5 | .214 | .250 | .600 | 1.3 | 0.3 | 0.2 | 0.0 | 2.0 |
| Seifeldin Hendawy | 4 | 4.2 | .000 | .000 | .667 | 1.5 | 0.0 | 0.0 | 0.0 | 1.0 |
| Anadji Chime | 2 | 1.1 | .000 | .000 | .000 | 0.5 | 0.0 | 0.0 | 0.0 | 0.0 |
