= NBA Africa Game 2018 =

Team World	Team Africa
96	92
	1	2	3	4	Total
Team World	27	27	24	18	96
Team Africa	20	27	21	24	92
- Date: 4 August 2018
- Venue: Sun Arena at Time Square, Pretoria, South Africa
- MVP: Danilo Gallinari, Team World
- Referees: Tony Brothers; Derrick Stafford

The 2018 NBA Africa Game was an exhibition basketball game played on 4 August 2018 in the Sun Arena at Time Square in Pretoria, South Africa. It was the third NBA game to take place on the continent of Africa, and continued with the format of Team Africa versus Team World.

The series followed its previous format of a team of players of African origin or immediate descent against an assortment of other players, with the 2018 Team World roster consisting almost entirely of players from the United States, with one Italian. In a first for the series, each roster included one female member, each a retired alumna from the WNBA.

Team World led for the vast majority of the game, with Team Africa, led by Joel Embiid, pulling to within three points in the final minute of play. Team Africa missed several attempts at what would have been the tying three-point shot; Team World scored the clinching free throw with 5 seconds remaining.

== Rosters ==
Team Africa
Pos.	Origin	Player	Team
F	South Sudan	Luol Deng	Los Angeles Lakers
C	Benin	Ian Mahinmi	Washington Wizards
F	Nigeria	Al-Farouq Aminu	Portland Trail Blazers
C	DR Congo	Bismack Biyombo	Charlotte Hornets
F	Mali	Cheick Diallo	New Orleans Pelicans
C	Cameroon	Joel Embiid	Philadelphia 76ers
G/F	Algeria	Evan Fournier	Orlando Magic
F/C	Congo	Serge Ibaka	Toronto Raptors
G/F	DR Congo	Timothe Luwawu-Cabarrot	Oklahoma City Thunder
F	Cameroon	Pascal Siakam	Toronto Raptors
C	Mozambique	Clarisse Machanguana	Retired WNBA alumna
Head coach: J. B. Bickerstaff (Memphis Grizzlies)

Team World
Pos.	Nat.	Player	Team
F/C	U.S.	John Collins	Atlanta Hawks
C	U.S.	JaVale McGee	Los Angeles Lakers
F/G	U.S.	Garrett Temple	Memphis Grizzlies
F	U.S.	Marvin Williams	Charlotte Hornets
F	U.S.	Harrison Barnes	Dallas Mavericks
F	Italy	Danilo Gallinari	Los Angeles Clippers
F	U.S.	Rudy Gay	San Antonio Spurs
F	U.S.	Khris Middleton	Milwaukee Bucks
C	U.S.	Hassan Whiteside	Miami Heat
F	U.S.	Swin Cash	Retired WNBA alumna
Head coach: Ettore Messina (San Antonio Spurs)
