= Solo Diabate =

Ivorian basketball player (born 1987)

Dar City
- Position: Shooting guard / point guard
- League: Road to BAL

Personal information
- Born: 21 July 1987 (age 39) Cocody, Ivory Coast
- Listed height: 6 ft 0 in (1.83 m)
- Listed weight: 167 lb (76 kg)

Career information
- NBA draft: 2009: undrafted
- Playing career: 2006–present

Career history
- 2006–2009: JDA Dijon
- 2009–2012: Chorale Roanne
- 2012–2013: SLUC Nancy
- 2013–2015: BCM Gravelines
- 2015–2016: Rouen Métropole
- 2016–2017: MZT Skopje
- 2017: Champagne Châlons-Reims
- 2017: Fujian Lightning
- 2018: Levickí Patrioti
- 2018–2019: SLUC Nancy
- 2019–2021: Fos Provence Basket
- 2021: Zamalek
- 2021–2022: Smouha
- 2021: →Al Ittihad
- 2022: US Monastir
- 2022–2023: Petro de Luanda
- 2023–2024: Al Ahly Ly
- 2024–2025: Petro de Luanda
- 2025–present: Dar City

Career highlights
- 2× BAL champion (2021, 2022); BAL All-Defensive First Team (2024); BAL Sportsmanship Award (2025); Tunisian League champion (2022); Tunisian Cup winner (2022); 2× Angolan League champion (2023, 2025); 2× Angolan Cup winner (2023, 2025); Pro A assists leader (2016)
Medals
Men's basketball
Representing Ivory Coast
AfroBasket
Silver medal – second place	2009 Libya
Silver medal – second place	2021 Rwanda

Mouloukou Souleyman Diabate (born 21 July 1987), commonly known as Solo Diabate, is an Ivorian basketball player for Dar City Basketball Club. After playing a decade in France and some years in North Macedonia, China and Slovakia, Diabate began his career at the African continent in 2021. He is a two-time BAL champion, with Zamalek in 2021 and US Monastir in 2022.

He also represents the Ivory Coast national team. With Ivory Coast, Diabate has won two silver medals at AfroBasket tournaments in 2009 and 2021.

== Professional career ==
=== France (2006–2016) ===
Diabate has played in the French League since 2006. In his career, he played for JDA Dijon Basket, Chorale Roanne Basket, SLUC Nancy Basket, and BCM Gravelines. In 2015, he signed with Rouen Métropole. In the 2015-2016 season, Diabate was the league's assist leader with 6.5 per game to go with his 10.4 points and 3.5 rebounds per game.

=== MZT Skopje (2017–2018) ===
On February 16, 2017, Diabate signed with the French team Châlons-Reims, after starting the season with MZT Skopje.

On 4 November 2016, he signed with MZT Skopje Aerodrom. On 13 January 2017, he left MZT Skopje On September 11, 2018, he signed with SLUC Nancy.

=== Africa (2021–present) ===
==== Zamalek (2020–2021) ====
In August 2021, Diabate signed with Egyptian club Zamalek to play in the 2021 BAL season. He helped Zamalek win the first first-ever championship of the Basketball Africa League (BAL) after winning the finals.

==== Egypt and US Monastir (2021–2022) ====
In August 2021, Diabate signed with Smouha to stay in Egypt. On 28 September 2021, Diabate was loaned to Al Ittihad to play in the 2021 Arab Club Basketball Championship. At Ittihad, he replaced the injured Corey Webster.

On 10 February 2022, Diabate signed with US Monastir ahead of the 2022 BAL season. He helped Monastir win the championships by winning the 2022 BAL Finals. Diabate became the first player ever to win two BAL championships.

==== Petro de Luanda (2022–2023) ====
In September 2022, Diabate signed a contract for Petro de Luanda in Angola to play in both the Angolan League and BAL. He won the 2023 Angolan Cup with the team, as well as the Angolan Basketball League title.

==== Al Ahly Benghazi (2023–2024) ====
Diabate joined Libyan club Al Ahly Benghazi for the 2024 BAL qualification tournaments. On 1 November 2023, Diabate made his debut and recorded 13 points and 9 assists in Al Ahly's 86–77 win over FAP. Diabate helped Al Ahly qualify for their first ever BAL season, which began in April. They reached the finals, in which Diabate scored 20 points but lost to his former team Petro de Luanda, thus missing out on his third championship. He posted BAL career-highs in points (11.3), rebounds (4.7), assists (5.8), steals (1.8) and blocks (0.4), and was named to the BAL All-Defensive First Team after the season.

==== Return to Petro de Luanda (2024–2025) ====
On 10 August 2024, Petro de Luanda announced that they signed Diabate, who returned after one year. He reached a record-extending fourth final with Petro, but lost to Al Ahli Tripoli. Diabate was however given the BAL Sportsmanship Award.

===== Dar City (2025–present) =====
On 8 October 2025, Diabate joined Tanzanian champions Dar City of the NBL and the Road to BAL.

== International career ==
Diabate was a member of the Ivory Coast national basketball team at the 2007 and 2009 FIBA Africa Championship. In 2009, he helped the team to a surprise silver medal to qualify for the country's first FIBA World Championship in 24 years. On 19 June 2015, Diabate was one of 27 players to be named to the Ivory Coast's preliminary squad for the 2015 Africa Championship by head coach Hugues Occansey.

Diabate played with Ivory Coast at AfroBasket 2021 in Rwanda and got his second silver medal.

== BAL career statistics ==
Legend
GP	Games played	GS	Games started	MPG	Minutes per game
FG%	Field goal percentage	3P%	3-point field goal percentage	FT%	Free throw percentage
RPG	Rebounds per game	APG	Assists per game	SPG	Steals per game
BPG	Blocks per game	PPG	Points per game	**Bold**	Career high
†	Won an BAL championship	*	Led the league

Year	Team	GP	GS	MPG	FG%	3P%	FT%	RPG	APG	SPG	BPG	PPG
2021†	Zamalek	5	0	18.1	.439	**.591***	.750	1.6	4.6	1.6	0.0	10.4
2022†	Monastir	6	**3**	25.3	.339	.190	**.889**	3.2	4.0	1.3	0.0	8.3
2023	Petro de Luanda	8	0	21.0	.400	.333	1.000	3.0	4.4	1.0	0.1	7.1
2024	Al Ahly Ly	**10**	2	**32.0**	.495	.304	.842	**4.7**	**5.8**	**1.8**	**0.4**	11.3
2025	Petro de Luanda	**10**	1	20.0	.379	.053	1.000	2.2	3.6	2.3	0.7	**11.7**
