= Nuni Omot =

South Sudanese-American basketball player (born 1994)

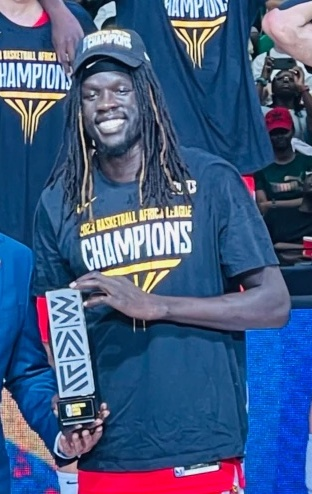
- Omot with the BAL Most Valuable Player Award in 2023

No. 2 – Hapoel Eilat
- Position: Power forward
- League: Israeli Basketball Premier League

Personal information
- Born: October 3, 1994 (age 32) Nairobi, Kenya
- Listed height: 6 ft 9 in (2.06 m)
- Listed weight: 216 lb (98 kg)

Career information
- High school: Mahtomedi (Mahtomedi, Minnesota)
- College: Concordia (MN) (2014–2015); Indian Hills CC (2015–2016); Baylor (2016–2018)
- NBA draft: 2018: undrafted
- Playing career: 2018–present

Career history
- 2018–2019: Long Island Nets
- 2019: MZT Skopje
- 2019–2020: ZZ Leiden
- 2020–2021: Tofaş
- 2020–2021: →Trefl Sopot
- 2021–2022: Gießen 46ers
- 2022: Leones de Ponce
- 2022–2023: Westchester Knicks
- 2023: Lakeland Magic
- 2023: Al Ahly
- 2023–2024: Chorale Roanne
- 2024: Ningbo Rockets
- 2024: Maccabi Ironi Ramat Gan
- 2024–2025: Beijing Ducks
- 2025–2026: Al Riyadi Club Beirut
- 2026: Magnolia Chicken Timplados Hotshots
- 2026–present: Hapoel Ironi Eilat

Career highlights
- BAL champion (2023); BAL Most Valuable Player (2023); All-BAL First Team (2023); NJCAA All-American Honorable Mention (2016); First-Team All-ICCAC (2016)
- Stats at NBA.com
- Stats at Basketball Reference

Anunwa "Nuni" Omot (born October 3, 1994) is a South Sudanese-American professional basketball player for Hapoel Ironi Eilat of the Israeli Basketball Premier League. He played college basketball for the Baylor Bears after two years at Concordia University and Indian Hills Community College. Omot is most known for his MVP season in the Basketball Africa League (BAL) with Al Ahly. Internationally he represents South Sudan, playing for the Bright Stars at the 2023 FIBA Basketball World Cup and the 2024 Olympics.

== Early life ==
Omot was born in a refugee camp in Nairobi, Kenya to Pillow and Kwot Omot. His parents and brother Aba lived in the camp for three years, following a dangerous 440-mile journey from Gambela, Ethiopia to the Kenyan border in escape from an ongoing civil war. They were arrested, spending one week in prison, before being freed with help from the United Nations and settling in the camp, which was crowded and did not provide adequate food. In 1996, Omot's mother and siblings moved to Minnesota with the help of Lutheran Immigration and Refugee Service. However, his father was barred from the United States for medical reasons.

Living in Minnesota, Omot was looked after by his brother Aba, while his mother worked two jobs at Menards and Burlington Coat Factory to support the family. Omot first began playing football as a wide receiver, but he started playing basketball after a growth spurt. He also played soccer but basketball soon became his primary focus.

As a junior in high school, Omot joined the junior varsity basketball team at Mahtomedi High School in Mahtomedi, Minnesota. He moved up to varsity in his senior season, averaging 18 points, 6 rebounds, and 2 assists. Omot earned All-Conference and honorable mention All-State accolades in his final year at Mahtomedi. Still, he failed to earn any NCAA Division I scholarship offers in high school.

== College career ==
Omot began his college career at Concordia in NCAA Division II and redshirted his freshman season, growing almost three inches. In 2014–15, he averaged 12.4 points and 5.5 rebounds per game, shooting 58 percent from the floor and 42 percent from behind the arc. In order to get more Division I exposure, Omot transferred to Indian Hills Community College. He averaged 12.2 points and 5.4 rebounds per game and started 33 games in one of the top junior college programs. He was named to the first-team all-conference and NJCAA Honorable mention All-American. Omot accepted a scholarship to Baylor on November 12, 2015.

Omot was forced to miss the fall semester of 2016 due to academic reasons and played limited minutes the rest of the year. His best performance was scoring 14 points in a 74–64 win over Texas on January 18, 2017. He averaged 4.0 points and 1.9 rebounds per game. Omot put in a lot of work in the summer of 2017 to improve his game. Omot began his senior season with 15 points against Central Arkansas and had 12 points the following game against Texas A&M–Corpus Christi. He registered a career-high 30 points in a 105–82 win over Randall on December 9, 2017. However, Omot struggled to start Big 12 play and was replaced in the starting lineup by Mark Vital. In a loss to Oklahoma on January 31, 2018, Omot scored 23 points and hit all six three-point attempts. On February 20, in a game against West Virginia, Omot met his father for the first time in 21 years. As a senior, Omot averaged 9.9 points, 3.6 rebounds and 1.7 assists per game. He shot 48.9 percent from the field and 43.3 percent on three-pointers, which was fifth in the Big 12 Conference.

== Professional career ==
=== Long Island Nets ===
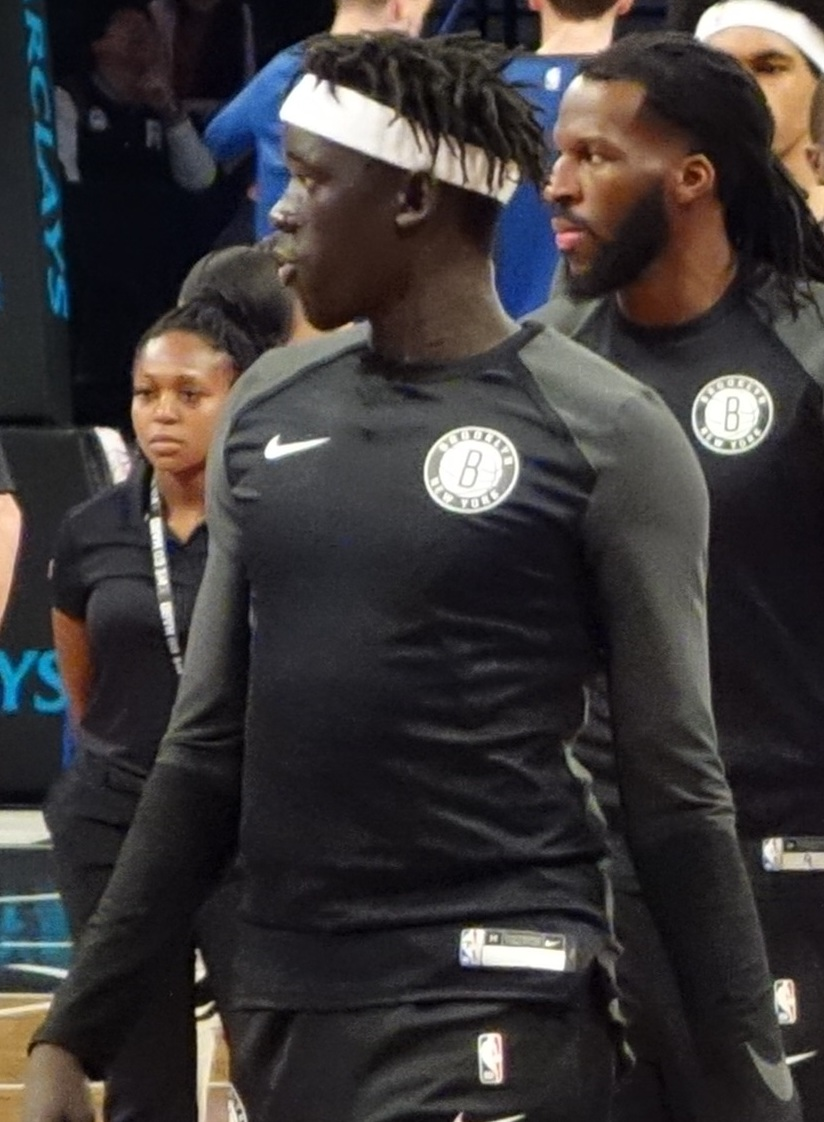
Omot in a pre-season game for the Brooklyn Nets in October 2018

After going undrafted in the 2018 NBA draft, Omot joined the Golden State Warriors for 2018 NBA Summer League. On September 25, 2018, he signed with the Brooklyn Nets on a training camp deal. Omot was waived by the Nets on October 11.

He was subsequently added to the roster of the Nets’ NBA G League affiliate, the Long Island Nets. With the Long Island Nets, in 2018-19 in 44 games he averaged 5.5 points, 1.9 rebounds, 0.5 assists , and 12.8 minutes per game while shooting 82.8% from the free throw line.

=== Playing during the coronavirus pandemic ===
On July 26, 2019, Omot signed with Macedonian club MZT Skopje. Omot averaged 18.5 points on 60% shooting in seven games.

On November 22, 2019, Omot was announced by ZZ Leiden of the Dutch Basketball League (DBL). His contract with Leiden began December 1. The 2019–20 season was cancelled prematurely in March because of the COVID-19 pandemic. Omot averaged 11.8 points in the DBL, and 17.8 points in the FIBA Europe Cup, the fourth level European competition.

=== Turkey ===
On June 12, 2020, Omot signed with the Turkish club Tofaş of the Basketbol Süper Ligi (BSL). On December 9, 2020, he was loaned to Trefl Sopot of PLK. Omot averaged 17.2 points and 4.9 rebounds per game.

=== Gießen 46ers ===
On July 20, 2021, Omot signed with the German club Gießen 46ers of the Basketball Bundesliga. In 32 games he averaged 14.9 points, 5.1 rebounds, 1.2 assists, and 26.1 minutes per game, shooting 49.9% from the floor

=== Puerto Rico (2022) ===
In 2022, Omot played in the Baloncesto Superior Nacional, Puerto Rico's professional league, with Leones de Ponce. In 27 games he averaged 15.0 points, 4.1 rebounds, 2.3 assists, and 29.6 minutes per game, shooting 82.4% from the free throw line.

=== Westchester Knicks (2022–2023) ===
In September 2022, the New York Knicks added Omot to their training camp roster. On September 23, 2022, Omot signed a contract with the New York Knicks. He was then later waived. On October 24, 2022, Omot joined the Westchester Knicks training camp roster. In 2022-23 in 31 games he averaged 10.4 points, 4.0 rebounds, 1.6 assists, and 21.9 minutes per game while shooting 80.0% from the free throw line.

=== Lakeland Magic (2023) ===
On March 2, 2023, Omot was traded to the Lakeland Magic. In 10 games he averaged 9.0 points, 3.1 rebounds, 1.5 assists, and 18.8 minutes per game while shooting 86.7% from the free throw line.

=== Al Ahly (2023) ===
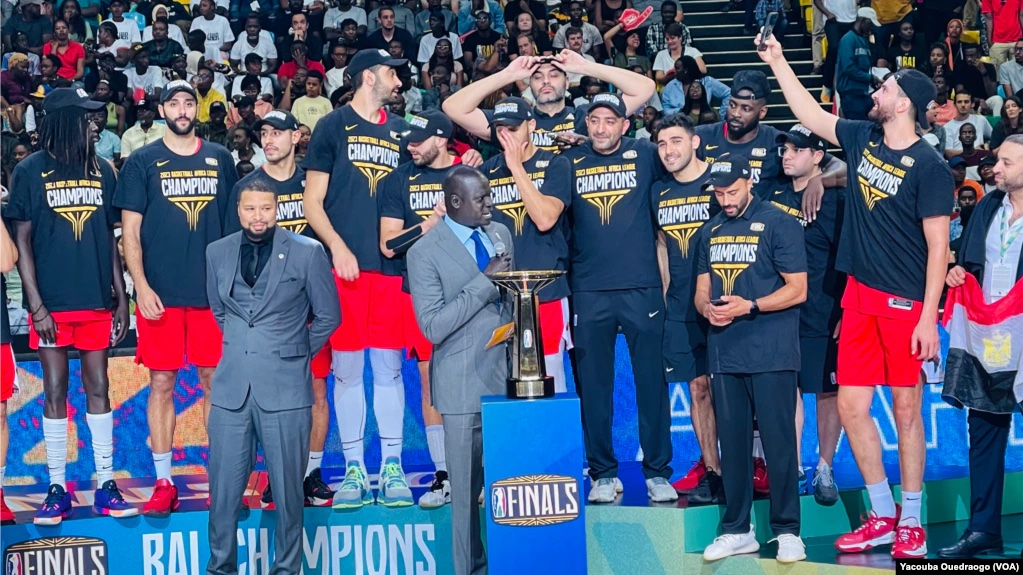
Omot (most left) and Al Ahly receiving the 2023 BAL championship trophy

In April 2023, Omot joined the Egyptian club Al Ahly ahead of their maiden campaign in the Basketball Africa League (BAL), in which he played eight games. He made his debut on April 26, scoring a team-high 21 points in a 92–73 opening day win over Ferroviário da Beira. On May 27, 2023, Al Ahly won their first-ever BAL championship after defeating AS Douanes in the final behind Omot's 22-point game. Omot was named the BAL Most Valuable Player, becoming the first African player to win the award.

On July 30, 2023, Omot signed with the Taichung Suns of the T1 League. On October 13, it was reported that all import players of the Taichung Suns left the team.

=== Chorale Roanne (2023–2024) ===
On October 29, 2023, Omot joined the French club Chorale Roanne of the LNB Pro A for the remainder of the season, in which he played four games for the team.

On January 17, 2024, Omot left the Chorale Roanne.

=== Ningbo Rockets (2024) ===
on February 19, 2024, Omot signed with the Ningbo Rockets of the Chinese Basketball Association. In 11 games he averaged 25.1 points, 5.9 rebounds, 1.7 assists, and 26.5 minutes per game, shooting 52.1% from the floor and 81.4% from the free throw line.

=== Maccabi Ironi Ramat Gan (2024) ===
On April 9, 2024, Omot signed with Maccabi Ironi Ramat Gan of the Israeli Basketball Premier League. In 11 games he averaged 15.2 points, 3.8 rebounds, 1.3 assists, and 27.2 minutes per game, shooting 50.0% from the floor and 82.0% from the free throw line.

=== Beijing Ducks (2024–2025) ===
On October 2, 2024, Omot signed with Beijing Ducks of the Chinese Basketball Association (CBA). In 56 games he averaged 11.4 points, 3.3 rebounds, 1.5 assists, and 19.4 minutes per game, shooting 46.6% from the floor and 83.6% from the free throw line.

=== APR (2025) ===
In May 2025, Omot joined the Rwandan champions APR ahead of the 2025 BAL playoffs, returning to the Basketball Africa League again after a one-year absence, and playing three games for the team in which he averaged 19.3 points per game.

=== Magnolia Chicken Timplados Hotshots (2026) ===
On March 11, 2026, Omot signed with the Magnolia Chicken Timplados Hotshots of the Philippine Basketball Association (PBA), and played three games for the team, averaging 32.3 points per game. On March 24, 2026, he was replaced by Clint Chapman.

=== Al-Ittihad Tripoli (2026) ===
On April 9, 2026, Omot signed with the Al-Ittihad Tripoli team of Libyan Basketball League.

=== Hapoel Ironi Eilat (2026–present) ===
October 4, 2026, Omot returned to Israel and signed with Hapoel Ironi Eilat of the Israeli Basketball Premier League.

== National team career ==
In February 2021, Omot was selected by the South Sudan national basketball team to play in the qualifiers for the 2023 FIBA Basketball World Cup. Omot made his debut on February 17, 2021, against Nigeria. He played a key role in the team and on February 25, 2023, Omot scored a team-high 26 points in the 83–75 win over Senegal that ensured South Sudan's first-ever qualification for the World Cup.

On August 30, 2023, while playing against Serbia, Omot unintentionally struck Borisa Simanic in the kidney during an offense. This blow resulted in a major injury which required his kidney to be removed.

Omot was a key player for South Sudan at the 2024 Olympics, where the country made its Olympic debut. He scored the first points for the country in the opening day win over Puerto Rico.

== Personal ==
Omot has both a South Sudanese and American passport.
