= Wajdi Dawo =

Libyan basketball player (born 1988)

No. 15 – Al Ahli Tripoli
- Position: Forward
- League: Libyan Division I Basketball League

Personal information
- Born: 29 October 1988 (age 36); Tripoli, Libya
- Listed height: 2.00 m (6 ft 7 in)

Career history
- Al Ahli Tripoli

Career highlights
- BAL champion (2025)

Wajdi Omran Saied Dawo (born 29 October 1988) is a Libyan basketball player who currently plays for Al Ahli Tripoli and the Libya national basketball team.

== Club career ==
Dawo has played for Al Ahli Tripoli for the majority of his career. He was part of Al Ahli's championship roster that won the Basketball Africa League (BAL) in the 2025 season.

== National team careernal team career ==
Dawo plays for the Libya national team, with whom he competed at the FIBA Africa Championship 2009. Dawo averaged 5 points and 3 rebounds per game in the tournament while playing in seven of Libya's eight games. In his first extended action for the team, Dawo scored a game high 15 points for the Libyans against Angola in the eighthfinals.

Six years later, Dawo also played at AfroBasket 2015.
