= 2024 BAL final =

Basketball Africa League championship game

- Event: 2024 BAL season
Petro de Luanda	Al Ahly Ly
(Angola)	(Libya)
(4–3)	(6–3)
107	94
Head coach: Sergio Valdeolmillos	Head coach: Ivan Jeremić
	1	2	3	4	Total
Petro de Luanda	26	14	35	32	107
Al Ahly Ly	24	28	23	19	94
- Date: 1 June 2024
- Venue: BK Arena, Kigali, Rwanda
- Favorite: Petro de Luanda (+146 on average)
- Referees: Hortencia Sánchez, Yann Davidson, Jean Sauveur Ruhamiriza
- Attendance: 6,404
- Halftime show: Ishami Talent

The 2024 BAL final was the championship game of the 2024 BAL season, the third season of the Basketball Africa League (BAL), and the conclusion of the playoffs. The final was played on 1 June 2024 at the BK Arena in Kigali, Rwanda, which hosted the final for a fourth consecutive year. The final was contested by Angolan club Petro de Luanda and Libyan club Al Ahly Ly.

Petro de Luada defeated Al Ahly Ly with a score of 107–94, winning their first-ever BAL title and their third continental championship, including the FIBA Africa Clubs Champions Cup. In doing so, they also became the first Sub-Saharan team to win the BAL championship. As winners, Petro de Luanda, qualified for the 2024 FIBA Intercontinental Cup.

== Background ==
Petro de Luanda became the second team to play in two BAL finals, returning after just one season and having already played and lost the 2022 finals. Al Ahly Ly were the first Libyan team to play in a final, as well as the first team that qualified through the Road to BAL qualifiers the same season to play in a final.

Al Ahly Ly guard Solo Diabate played a in a record-setting third final, and had the chance to become the first player to win three BAL championships, and faced his former team in the final.

=== Previous finals ===
In the following table, finals played in the FIBA Africa Clubs Champions Cup (ACC), the previous highest level continental competition, are in small text.

Team	Previous final appearances (bold indicates winners)
(Angola) Petro de Luanda	BAL: 1 (2022); FIBA ACC: 8 (1994, 1999, 2000, **2006**, 2007, 2009, 2012, **2015**)
(Libya) Al Ahly Ly	None

== Venue ==
On 19 June 2023, the BAL announced that BK Arena was used as the host arena for the playoffs and final for a fourth straight year, under an agreement with the Rwanda Development Board.

Kigali	2024 BAL final (Africa)
BK Arena	2024 BAL final (Africa)
Capacity: 10,000	2024 BAL final (Africa)

== Road to the final ==
(Angola) Petro de Luanda		Round	(Libya) Al Ahly Ly	
Opponent	Result	Conference phase	Opponent	Result
**2024 BAL Kalahari Conference**: Pos / Team / Pld / PCT; 1 / (Morocco) FUS Rabat / 4 / **.750**; **2** / (Angola) Petro de Luanda / **4** / **.500**; 3 / (South Africa) Cape Town Tigers (H) / 4 / **.250**; 4 / (Burundi) Dynamo (D) / 0 / —; Source: BAL (D) Disqualified; (H) Hosts		Standings	**2024 BAL Nile Conference**: Pos / Team / Pld / PCT; 1 / (Egypt) Al Ahly (H) / 6 / **.833**; **2** / (Libya) Al Ahly Ly / **6** / **.500**; 3 / (Central African Republic) Bangui SC / 6 / **.500**; 4 / (Uganda) City Oilers / 6 / **.167**; Source: BAL (H) Hosts	
(Morocco) FUS Rabat	L 73–82	Matchday 1	(Central African Republic) Bangui SC	W 93–71
(South Africa) Cape Town Tigers	W 100–88	Matchday 2	(Egypt) Al Ahly	L 88–98
(Morocco) FUS Rabat	W 89–86	Matchday 3	(Uganda) City Oilers	W 79–68
(South Africa) Cape Town Tigers	L 78–84	Matchday 4	(Central African Republic) Bangui SC	L 93–96
—N/a		Matchday 5	(Egypt) Al Ahly	L 76–87
—N/a		Matchday 6	(Uganda) City Oilers	W 110–78
Opponent	Agg.	Playoffs	Opponent	Agg.
(Tunisia) US Monastir	L 67–70	Seeding game	(South Africa) Cape Town Tigers	W 87–67
(Senegal) AS Douanes	W 66–65	Quarterfinals	(Egypt) Al Ahly	W 86–77
(South Africa) Cape Town Tigers	W 96–86 (OT)	Semifinals	(Nigeria) Rivers Hoopers	W 89–83 (OT)

=== Petro de Luanda ===
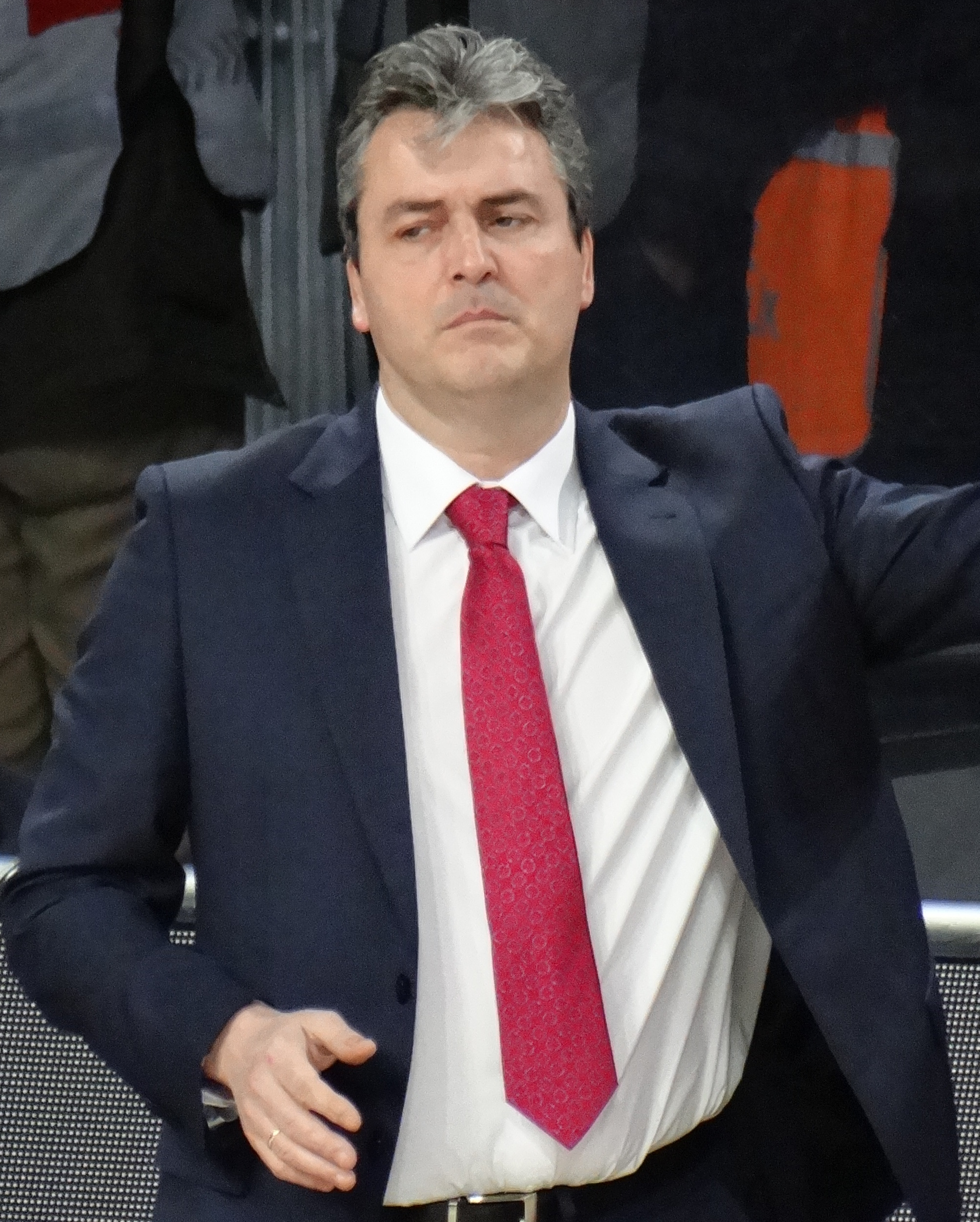
Spaniard Sergio Valdeolmillos took over the team in March

Petro de Luanda qualified for their fourth straight BAL season by winning their sixteenth Angolan Basketball League championship, having defeated Primeiro de Agosto in the national finals. The team largely remained the same, while Yanick Moreira and Edmir Lucas returned to Petro. They were allocated in the inaugural Kalahari Conference, in a group with FUS Rabat, Cape Town Tigers and Dynamo. Following the disqualification of Dynamo, who refused to play with the Visit Rwanda sponsorship logo, Petro went 2–2 in the conference, dropping one games against each opponent. Their result in the conference phase was largely seen as a disappointment, something that eventually led to the firing of head coach José Neto. Neto, who had was in the fourth season with the team, was officially fired on 21 March. Sergio Valdeolmillos was hired as his successor four days after.

Nick Faust was acquired for the 2024 BAL playoffs, while Anthony Nelson left the team. Petro faced US Monastir in a match-up for the fifth seed, but lost following a Firas Lahyani buzzer beater. In the quarterfinals, they were matched up with AS Douanes in a re-match of the 2023 BAL final. Despite trailing by 20 points at one point in the game, Petro came back to advance. In the semifinal, Petro met the Cape Town Tigers for a third game of the season, and managed to pull ahead in overtime.

=== Al Ahly Ly ===
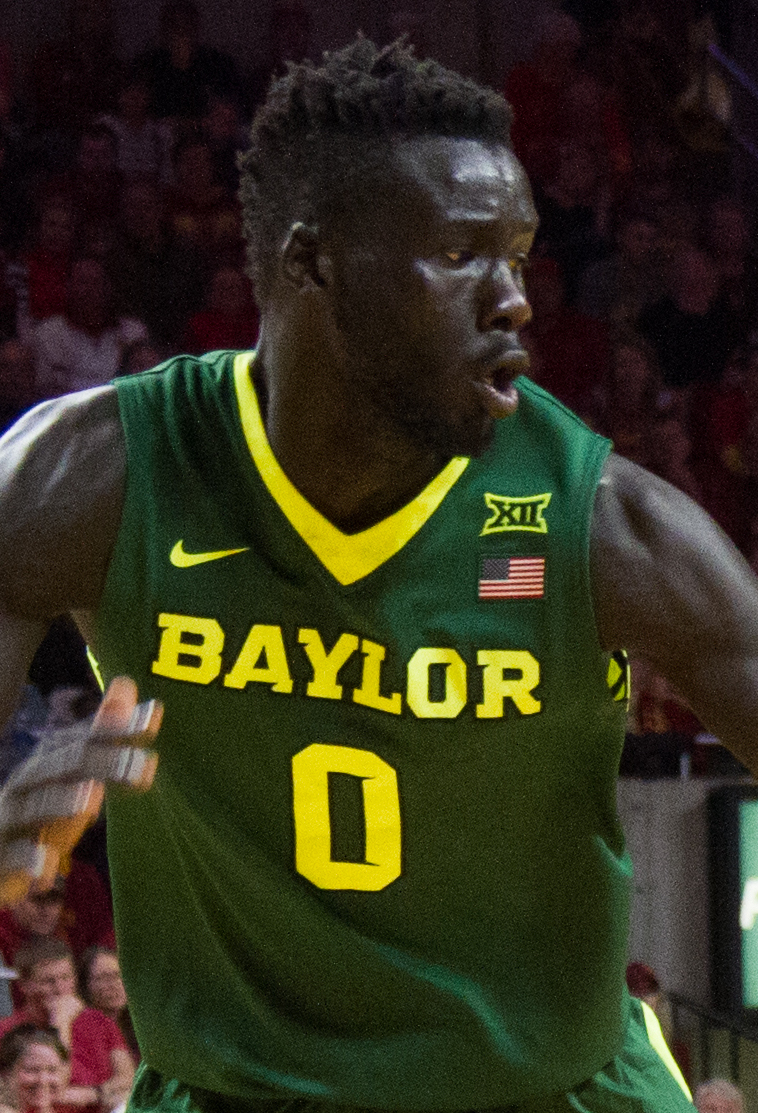
Al Ahly Ly's Jo Lual-Acuil came into the final as the league's leading scorer

Al Ahly Ly qualified for the BAL after finishing in the third place of the West Division in the Road to BAL, defeating FAP in the final game. During the Road to BAL, the team was led by Ater Majok and Chris Crawford, both former all-BAL selections. Majok and Crawford left the team, however, Al Ahly Ly reinforced their team with Jo Lual-Acuil, Majok Deng, Pierre Jackson and Kevin Murphy as their foreign core. They were allocated in the Nile Conference where they finished in second place, successfully sealing their playoff berth in the last gameday by defeating the City Oilers. Al Ahly Ly finished with a 3–3 record but held the tie-breaker over Bangui Sporting Club, based on aggregate points in the match-up between the two teams.

Ahead of the playoffs, Trae Golden, top scorer of the Chinese Basketball Association (CBA), was acquired and Pierre Jackson left the team. Golden helped Al Ahly Ly to the seventh seed, following a large defeat over the Cape Town Tigers in the 7th-8th seed placement game. In the quarterfinals, they were matched up with the defending champions Al Ahly. In surprising fashion, the Libyans handed Al Ahly their largest loss in BAL history. In the semifinal, Al Ahly Ly faced fourth seed Rivers Hoopers and managed to win the game after overtime.

== Game ==
The first quarter of the game was closely contested, with Petro closing the quarter with a two-point lead. At halftime, Al Ahly Ly led by as much as twelve points with a score of 52–40, as Petro de Luanda gave up the most points in a first half they had in the season. In the third quarter, Petro fought back and following a Gerson Gonçalves three-pointer, the Angolans took a 68–67 lead with 2:30 left in the third quarter. In the fourth quarter, Petro guard Nick Faust, who finished with a team-high 24 points, led the way to give them the final push. The Angolans gradually grew their lead, behind back-to-back buckets from Markeith Cummings and Nick Faust, to eventually play the game out. On Al Ahly Ly's side, league top scorer Jo Lual-Acuil was limited to just 15 points, while Majok Deng contributed 24, Trae Golden had 21, and Solo Diabate had 20 points.

Petro de Luanda became the first Angolan team to win the BAL title, as well as the first Sub-Saharan team to win the championship.

1 June 2024
4:00 PM

Livestats

**Petro de Luanda** (Angola)	**107**–94	(Libya) Al Ahly Ly
Scoring by quarter: **26**–24, 14–**28**, **35**–23, **32**–19
Pts: Faust 24; Rebs: Gonçalves 8 Asts: Gonçalves 8		Pts: Deng 24; Rebs: Lual-Acuil 9 Asts: Golden 8

BK Arena, Kigali, Rwanda
Attendance: 6,404
Referees: Hortencia Sánchez, Yann Davidson, Jean Sauveur Ruhamiriza

Starters:			Pts	Reb	Ast
PG	00	(Angola) Gerson Domingos	3	2	2
SG	10	(Angola) Gerson Gonçalves	16	8	8
SF	24	(Angola) Glofate Buiamba	5	2	1
PF	4	(United States) Markeith Cummings	20	5	3
C	2	(Angola) Yanick Moreira	12	7	2
Reserves:					
G	1	(Angola) Aginaldo Neto	DNP		
F	5	(Angola) Childe Dundão	9	5	5
G	6	(Angola) Carlos Morais	0	2	0
G	7	(Angola) Jone Pedro	6	2	1
F	12	(Angola) Eduardo Simão	DNP		
C	14	(Angola) Clésio Castro	10	4	1
F	15	(Angola) Aboubakar Gakou	2	3	0
C	23	(United States) Nick Faust	24	3	4
Head coach:
(Spanish Basketball Federation) Sergio Valdeolmillos

**Petro de Luanda**	**Al Ahly Ly**

Petro de Luanda	Statistics	Al Ahly Ly
32/54 (59%)	2-pt field goals	23/44 (52%)
11/30 (36%)	3-pt field goals	8/19 (42%)
10/16 (62%)	Free throws	24/32 (75%)
19	Offensive rebounds	8
28	Defensive rebounds	24
47	Total rebounds	32
27	Assists	18
12	Turnovers	14
9	Steals	4
2	Blocks	3
26	Fouls	17

2024 BAL champions

**Petro de Luanda**
1st BAL title; 3rd continental title

Starters:			Pts	Reb	Ast
PG	4	(United States) Kevin Murphy	7	4	2
SG	12	(United States) Trae Golden	21	3	8
SF	15	(Libya) Mahmoud Benalhaj	0	1	1
PF	28	(South Sudan) Majok Deng	24	4	2
C	41	(South Sudan) Jo Lual-Acuil	15	9	1
Reserves:					
G	2	(Libya) Assane Mandian	DNP		
G	6	(Libya) Andrees Zeew	DNP		
G	7	(Libya) Rasheed Alrashidi	DNP		
G	10	(Ivory Coast) Solo Diabate	20	2	4
F	14	(Libya) Asmaeil Aljahmi	DNP		
F	24	(Libya) Sofian Hamad	2	2	2
F/C	34	(Libya) Ghayth Almaghribi	DNP		
F/C	50	(Libya) Omarr Aldirfeeli	DNP		
Head coach:
(Basketball Federation of Serbia) Ivan Jeremić

== Aftermath ==
Following the game, Al Ahly Ly's center Jo Lual-Acuil was named the BAL Most Valuable Player, becoming the second South Sudanese and the first player on a non-championship team to win the award. Sergio Valdeolmillos became the second Spaniard to win a BAL championship, following Augustí Julbe who had won the league two times before.
