= Fouad Abou Chakra =

Lebanese basketball coach (born 1967)

Al ittihad libya
- Position: Head coach
- League: BAL

Personal information
- Born: 1 February 1967 (age 59) Beirut, Lebanon
- Coaching career: 1996–present

Career history

Coaching
- 1996–1998: Al Wardiye
- 1998–2000: Antranik
- 2000–2004: Champville SC
- 2004–2012: Al Riyadi
- 2012–2018: Sagesse
- 2018–2020: Champville SC
- 2020–2021: Al-Ahli Jeddah
- 2021–2022: Ohod
- 2022: Al Ittihad Aleppo
- 2022–2023: Al Ittihad Tripoli
- 2023–present: Al Ahli Tripoli

Career highlights
- BAL champion (2025); BAL Coach of the Year (2025); Libyan Cup winner (2023; Syrian League champion (2022); 7× LBL champion (2005–2011); Lebanese Cup winner (2006, 2007, 2008); 5× Arab Championship (2005–2007, 2009, 2010)

Fouad Abou Chakra (born 1 February 1967) is a Lebanese basketball coach who is the current head coach of Al Ahli Tripoli of the Libyan Division I Basketball League and Basketball Africa League (BAL). He has coached for several teams in Lebanon and the Middle East. Chakra is the most successful coach in Al Riyadi's history with seven Lebanese league titles. Chakra led Al Ahli Tripoli to a BAL championship in 2025.

== Early life ==
Chakra started playing basketball in Beirut with Champville SC when he was young, before moving to Adonis. He then went on to play in Cyprus in the Division A, before returning to Lebanon with Al Amal Bekfaya.

== Coaching career ==
=== First years ===
Having player with Al Amal Bekfaya, he followed several coaching courses and eventually became an assistant coach with the team. His signed with Al Wardiye in 1996 and switched to Antranik two years later. Chakra then coached Champville SC.

=== Lebanon (2004–2012) ===
Chakra signed with Al Riyadi in the 2004–05 season. Chakra went on to win the 2004–05 Lebanese Basketball League, ending an 8-year title drought. Al Riyadi ended the season undefeated with 25 wins, setting a new league record. Chakra went on to win a total of seven Lebanese League titles with Al Riyadi in the following years, the most by any Al Riyadi coach.

He left Al Riyadi after the 2011–12 season, and signed for Sagesse, where he stayed for six seasons. He then returned to Champville SC for a second stint, where he stayed two more years.

=== Saudi Arabia, Syria and Libya ===
Chakra joined Saudi Arabian team Al Ahli Jeddah for the 2020–21 season. In the 2021–22 season, he began the season with another Saudi club, Ohod Club. However, in May 2022, Chakra signed with Al Ittihad Aleppo, and then led them to the Syrian Basketball League championship.

On 14 August 2022, Chakra joined Al Ittihad Tripoli. He led them to the 2023 Libyan Cup.

==== Al Ahli Tripoli (2023–present) ====
In the 2023–24 season, he joined Libyan club Al Ahli Tripoli and won the 2024 Division 1 championship. Chakra then led Tripoli through the Road to BAL qualifiers, to their first ever qualification for the Basketball Africa League (BAL). The team impressed in the group phase with an undefeated record, blowing out all of its opponents. On June 13, he was named the BAL Coach of the Year. The following day, his team beat Petro de Luanda in the final to win the league championship. Chakra became the first coach to win both the championship and the Coach of the Year award.

== National team career ==
In March 2007, Chakra was hired as the head coach of the Lebanon national team, succeeding Paul Coughter. In 2024, he coached the Libya national team, and helped them qualify for the AfroBasket 2025, the first African tournament for the country in 16 years.

== Honours ==
Al Ahli Tripoli

- Basketball Africa League: 2025

Al Ittihad Tripoli

- Libyan Cup: 2023

Al Ittihad Aleppo

- Syrian Basketball League: 2021–22

Al Riyadi

- Lebanese Basketball League: 2005, 2006, 2007, 2008, 2009, 2010, 2011
- Lebanese Cup: 2006, 2007, 2008
- Arab Club Basketball Championship: 2005, 2006, 2007, 2009, 2010

Individual awards

- BAL Coach of the Year: 2025

== Head coaching record ==
=== BAL ===
Legend
Regular season	G	Games coached	W	Games won	L	Games lost	W–L %	Win–loss %
Playoffs	PG	Playoff games	PW	Playoff wins	PL	Playoff losses	PW–L %	Playoff win–loss %

Team	Year	G	W	L	W–L%	Finish	PG	PW	PL	PW–L%	Result
Al Ahli Tripoli	2025	6	6	0	1.000	1st in Nile Conference	4	3	1	.750	Champions
