= Jaylen Adams =

American basketball player (born 1996)

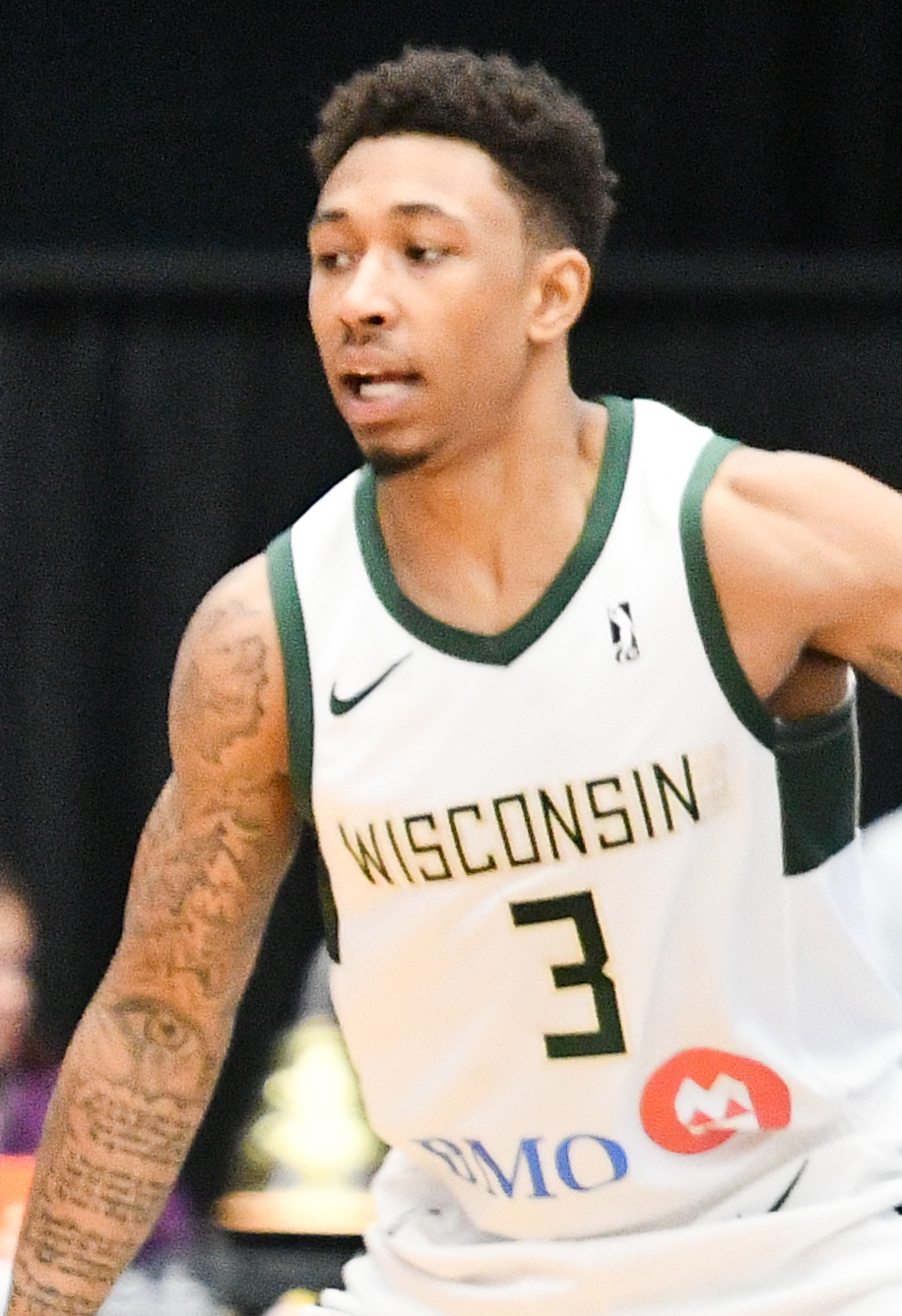
- Adams with the Wisconsin Herd in 2019

No. 3 – Maccabi Ramat Gan
- Position: Point guard
- League: Israeli Basketball Premier League

Personal information
- Born: May 4, 1996 (age 30) Hanover, Maryland, U.S.
- Listed height: 6 ft 2 in (1.88 m)
- Listed weight: 185 lb (84 kg)

Career information
- High school: Mount St. Joseph (Baltimore, Maryland)
- College: St. Bonaventure (2014–2018)
- NBA draft: 2018: undrafted
- Playing career: 2018–present

Career history
- 2018–2019: Atlanta Hawks
- 2018–2019: →Erie BayHawks
- 2019–2020: Wisconsin Herd
- 2020: Portland Trail Blazers
- 2020–2021: Milwaukee Bucks
- 2021–2022: Sydney Kings
- 2022: Crvena zvezda
- 2022–2023: Qingdao Eagles
- 2023–2025: Sydney Kings
- 2024: Liaoning Flying Leopards
- 2025: Al Ahli Tripoli
- 2025: Brisbane Bullets
- 2026: Shijiazhuang Xianglan
- 2026–present: Maccabi Ramat Gan

Career highlights
- BAL champion (2025); All-BAL First Team (2025); NBL champion (2022); NBL Most Valuable Player (2022); All-NBL First Team (2022); All-NBA G League First Team (2020); AP Honorable Mention All-American (2018); Atlantic 10 Co-Player of the Year (2018); 3× First-team All-Atlantic 10 (2016–2018)
- Stats at NBA.com
- Stats at Basketball Reference

Jaylen Tairique Adams (born May 4, 1996) is an American professional basketball player for Maccabi Ramat Gan of the Israeli Basketball Premier League. He played college basketball for the St. Bonaventure Bonnies, earning co-Atlantic 10 Conference Player of the Year honors as a senior in 2018. With the Sydney Kings of the Australian National Basketball League (NBL) in 2021–22, Adams was named league MVP and helped the Kings win the NBL championship. He won the BAL championship in 2025 with Al Ahli Tripoli.

== High school and college career ==
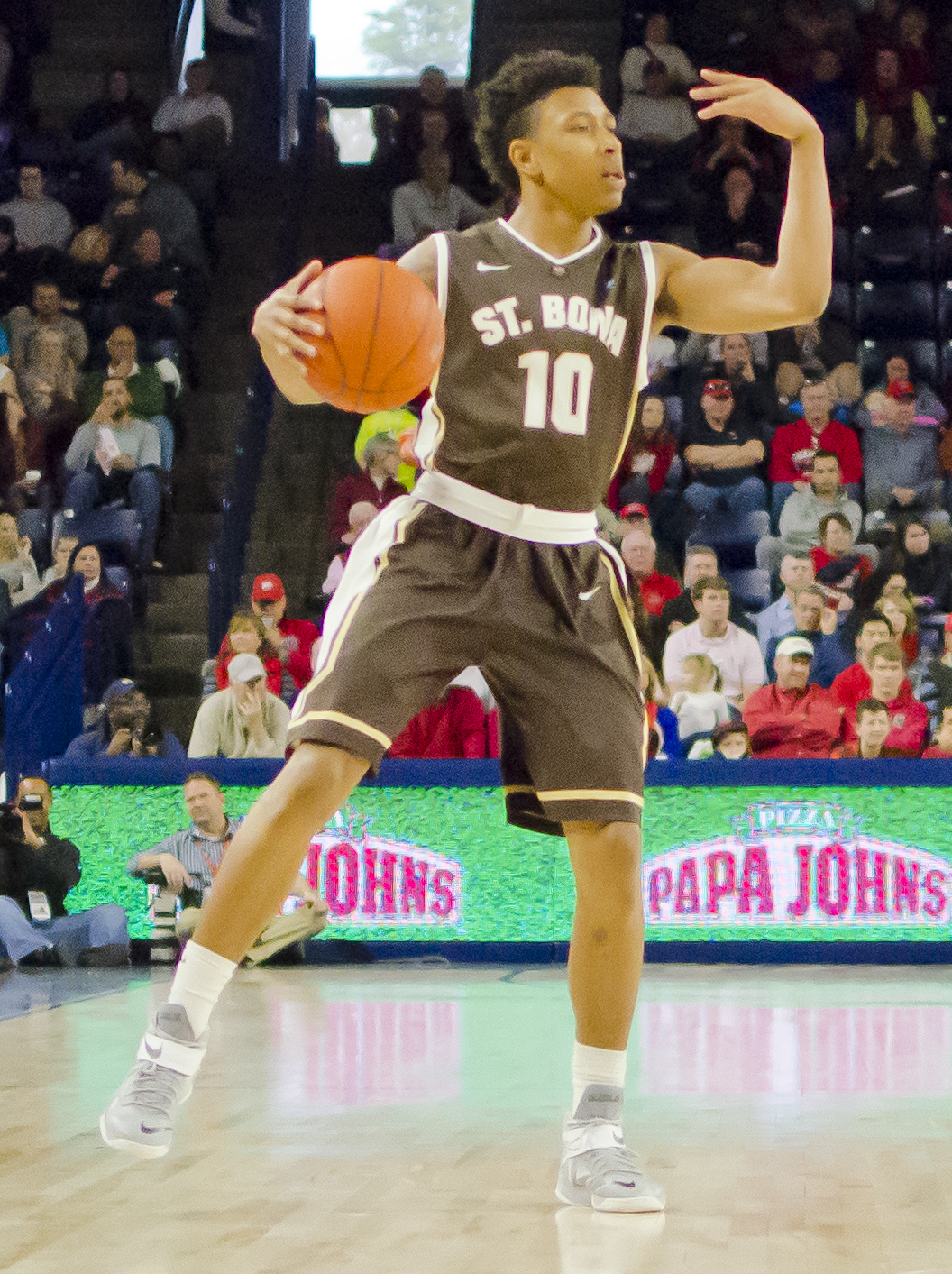
Adams with St. Bonaventure in 2015

Adams played high school basketball for Mount St. Joseph where he was a three-time MIAA A Conference champion. He committed to play in college for St. Bonaventure, averaging 17.9 points, 5.0 assists and 3.7 rebounds per game as a sophomore and was named a first-team All-Atlantic 10 player. In his junior season, Adams finished second in the Atlantic 10 Conference in scoring (20.6 points per game), first in assists (6.5 per game) and second in steals (2.1 per game). He was named to the First Team All-Atlantic 10 for the second straight year.

Adams missed the first six games of his senior season. In February 2018, Adams scored, 40 and 44 points games against Duquesne and St. Louis, respectively. As a senior, Adams was the fourth-leading scorer in the Atlantic 10 with 19.1 points per game to go with 5.2 assists per game. He led St. Bonaventure to a 26–8 record and upset of UCLA in the NCAA tournament. He was named conference co-Player of the Year with Peyton Aldridge. After the season, Adams was invited to the Reese's College All-Star Game but missed it with an ankle injury and instead played in the Portsmouth Invitational Tournament.

== Professional career ==
=== Atlanta Hawks (2018–2019) ===
After going undrafted in the 2018 NBA draft, Adams was signed by the Atlanta Hawks to a two-way contract. Under the terms of the deal he will split time between the Hawks and their NBA G League affiliate, the Erie BayHawks. Adams made his NBA debut on October 17, 2018, recording 1 rebound and 1 assist in 4 minutes of action in a blowout 127–106 loss to the New York Knicks. He scored 23 points in his G League debut in a win over the Grand Rapids Drive. On February 20, 2019, the Atlanta Hawks announced they had re-signed Adams to a multi-year contract. On July 13, 2019, Adams was waived by the Hawks.

=== Wisconsin Herd (2019–2020) ===
On August 20, 2019, Adams signed an Exhibit 10 contract with the Milwaukee Bucks. He was cut in training camp and assigned to the Bucks' G League affiliate, the Wisconsin Herd. Adams scored a season-high 39 points including 6 three-pointers in a 122–115 win over the Grand Rapids Drive. On March 4, 2020, Adams dished out a career-high 14 assists to go along with his 19 points in a 106–108 loss to the Canton Charge. He averaged 21.5 points, 5.0 rebounds and 5.4 assists per game for the Herd.

=== Portland Trail Blazers (2020) ===
After the G League season, Adams was signed by the Portland Trail Blazers during the COVID-19 NBA restart to replace veteran forward Trevor Ariza, who opted out of returning to the NBA in Orlando due to child custody reasons. Adams missed several games with a lower back injury.

=== Milwaukee Bucks (2020–2021) ===
On November 24, 2020, the Milwaukee Bucks announced that they had signed Adams to two-way contract. On March 4, 2021, Adams was reported to have been waived by the Bucks after he appeared in seven games.

=== Sydney Kings (2021–2022) ===
On August 22, 2021, Adams signed with the Sydney Kings for the 2021–22 NBL season. He was named league MVP and helped lead the Kings to the NBL championship.

=== Crvena zvezda (2022) ===
On July 29, 2022, Adams signed with Crvena zvezda of the ABA League. He parted ways with the team on November 3, 2022.

=== Qingdao Eagles (2022–2023) ===
In December 2022, Adams joined the Qingdao Eagles of the Chinese Basketball Association (CBA). He played nine games for Qingdao between December 18 and January 9.

=== Sydney Kings and Liaoning Flying Leopards (2023–2025) ===
On July 12, 2023, Adams signed with the Sydney Kings for the 2023–24 NBL season, returning to the franchise for a second stint. On January 14, 2024, he scored 39 points in 27 minutes in a 105–76 win over the New Zealand Breakers.

In March 2024, Adams had a five-game stint with Liaoning Flying Leopards of the CBA.

On July 1, 2024, Adams re-signed with the Kings for the 2024–25 NBL season. He was sidelined in October 2024 due to a back injury. On December 30, 2024, he scored 41 points in a 111–96 loss to the Adelaide 36ers. On January 24, 2025, he scored 43 points in a 105–96 loss to the 36ers.

=== Al Ahli Tripoli (2025) ===
In May 2025, Adams joined Libyan club Al Ahli Tripoli, making his debut in the Basketball Africa League (BAL). He helped Tripoli win their first BAL championship, which they won on June 14, 2025, after defeating Petro de Luanda in the final. He was also selected to the All-BAL Team, as one of the two guards alongside teammate Jean Jacques Boissy.

=== Brisbane Bullets (2025) ===
On July 13, 2025, Adams signed with the Brisbane Bullets for the 2025–26 NBL season. He was released by the Bullets on November 14, after averaging 12.8 points and 5.3 assists in 13 games.

=== Shijiazhuang Xianglan (2026–present) ===
In February 2026, Adams signed with Shijiazhuang Xianglan of the Chinese NBL.

== Career statistics ==
Legend
GP	Games played	GS	Games started	MPG	Minutes per game
FG%	Field goal percentage	3P%	3-point field goal percentage	FT%	Free throw percentage
RPG	Rebounds per game	APG	Assists per game	SPG	Steals per game
BPG	Blocks per game	PPG	Points per game	**Bold**	Career high

=== NBA ===
==== Regular season ====
Year	Team	GP	GS	MPG	FG%	3P%	FT%	RPG	APG	SPG	BPG	PPG
2018–19	Atlanta	**34**	**1**	**12.6**	**.345**	**.338**	**.778**	**1.8**	**1.9**	**.4**	**.1**	**3.2**
2020–21	Milwaukee	7	0	2.6	.125	.000	–	.4	.3	.0	.0	.3
Career		41	1	10.9	.331	.329	.778	1.5	1.6	.3	.1	2.7

==== Playoffs ====
Year	Team	GP	GS	MPG	FG%	3P%	FT%	RPG	APG	SPG	BPG	PPG
2020	Portland	3	0	7.0	.333	.000	.000	1.0	.7	.3	.0	2.0
Career		3	0	7.0	.333	.000	.000	1.0	.7	.3	.0	2.0

=== NBL ===
Year	Team	GP	GS	MPG	FG%	3P%	FT%	RPG	APG	SPG	BPG	PPG
2021–22	Sydney	21	21	31.7	.430	.401	.815	5.1	6.1	1.2	.3	**20.1**
Career		21	21	31.7	.430	.401	.815	5.1	6.1	1.2	.3	20.1

=== College ===
Year	Team	GP	GS	MPG	FG%	3P%	FT%	RPG	APG	SPG	BPG	PPG
2014–15	St. Bonaventure	22	22	32.5	.386	.324	.783	2.5	4.5	1.1	.0	10.0
2015–16	St. Bonaventure	**30**	**30**	**37.5**	**.445**	**.438**	**.874**	**3.7**	5.0	1.3	**.3**	17.9
2016–17	St. Bonaventure	30	29	37.4	.419	.356	.821	**3.7**	**6.5**	**2.1**	.2	**20.6**
2017–18	St. Bonaventure	28	27	37.0	.437	.436	.851	3.4	5.2	1.5	**.3**	19.1
Career		110	108	36.3	.427	.394	.838	3.4	5.4	1.5	.2	17.4

== Personal life ==
Adams' father, Darryl, played for the Maryland Terrapins football team, while his mother, Yalonda, played basketball at Wesley College in Delaware. His younger brother, Brendan, played basketball for the UConn Huskies and George Washington Revolutionaries, while his cousin, Troy Caupain, played basketball at University of Cincinnati.
