= Clésio Castro =

Angolan basketball player (born 1997)

No. 14 – Petro de Luanda
- Position: Center
- League: Angolan League; BAL

Personal information
- Born: February 22, 1997 (age 28)
- Listed height: 6 ft 7 in (2.01 m)

Career history
- –2022: Primeiro de Agosto
- 2022–2023: Sangalhos DC
- 2023–present: Petro de Luanda

Career highlights
- BAL champion (2024); Angolan League champion (2024)

Clésio Castro (born February 22, 1997) is an Angolan professional basketball player for Petro de Luanda and the Angola national team. Standing at 6 ft 7 in (2.01 m), he plays as center and is a product of the Primeiro de Agosto youth academy.

== Professional career ==
Castro came up through Primeiro de Agosto's youth ranks and eventually became a player in the senior team, playing in the Angolan Basketball League.

In the 2022–23 season, Castro played in Portugal with Sangalhos DC of the Liga Portuguesa de Basquetebol (LPB). There he joined Leonel Paulo and Jerónimo Luís, becoming the third Angolan player on the team.

Castro joined Petro de Luanda for the 2023–24 season. In May 2024, Castro was added to Petro de Luanda's roster for the 2024 BAL playoffs. He provided a massive performance in the final, scoring 10 points off the bench against Al Ahly Ly, to help Petro win their first BAL championship.

== National team career ==
Castro made his debut for Angola in the qualification for the 2023 World Cup.
