= Patrick Gardner =

American-Egyptian basketball player (born 1999)

Free agent
- Position: Center

Personal information
- Born: June 16, 1999 (age 27) Merrick, New York, U.S.
- Listed height: 7 ft 0 in (2.13 m)
- Listed weight: 250 lb (113 kg)

Career information
- High school: Sanford H. Calhoun (Merrick, New York)
- College: Nassau CC (2017–2019); Saint Michael's (2019–2022); Marist (2022–2023)
- NBA draft: 2023: undrafted
- Playing career: 2023–present

Career history
- 2023–2024: Long Island Nets
- 2024: Al Ahly
- 2024: Petro de Luanda
- 2024: Long Island Nets
- 2024–2025: Osceola Magic
- 2025: Petro de Luanda
- 2025–2026: Fukushima Firebonds
- 2026: Meralco Bolts

Career highlights
- All-BAL First Team (2025); Second-team All-MAAC (2023)
- Stats at NBA.com
- Stats at Basketball Reference

Patrick Yousef Gardner (born 16 June 1999) is an American-Egyptian professional basketball player who last played for the Meralco Bolts of the Philippine Basketball Association (PBA). He played college basketball for Nassau Community College, Saint Michael's College and Marist.

== Professional career ==
=== Long Island Nets (2023–2024) ===
After going undrafted in the 2023 NBA draft, Gardner signed with the Brooklyn Nets, but was waived two days later. On October 28, he joined the Long Island Nets.

=== Al Ahly (2024) ===
On February 29, 2024, Gardner signed with Al Ahly of the Egyptian Premier League and the Basketball Africa League (BAL), joining the teammafter the G League season. On April 19, 2024, Gardner made his BAL debut and had 4 points, 4 rebounds and 3 assists in a 99–76 win over City Oilers.

=== Petro de Luanda (2024) ===
In August 2024, Gardner joined the defending BAL champions Petro de Luanda of Angola.

=== Return to Long Island (2024) ===
On September 20, 2024, Gardner signed with the Brooklyn Nets, but was waived two days later. On October 27, he joined the Long Island Nets.

=== Osceola Magic (2024–2025) ===
On December 26, 2024, Gardner was traded to the Osceola Magic in exchange for Trevon Scott.

=== Fukushima Firebonds (2025–2026) ===
On 27 May 2025, Gardner signed with the Fukushima Firebonds of the Japanese B.League.

=== Return to Petro de Luanda (2025) ===
In May 2025, Gardner returned to Petro de Luanda as the team began its campaign in the 2025 BAL season. He led Petro to their second straight BAL final, where they lost to Al Ahli Tripoli. Gardner was selected for the All-BAL Team after the season's end.

=== Meralco Bolts (2026) ===
On May 26, 2026, Gardner signed with the Meralco Bolts of the Philippine Basketball Association (PBA).

== Personal life ==
Gardner was born in Merrick, New York to an Egyptian mother and American father. Growing up in the United States, Gardner spent his summers in Egypt.

== National team career ==
Gardner played at the 2023 FIBA Basketball World Cup for the Egypt national team. He averaged 8.8 points and 4.8 rebounds per game and had his best game in Egypt's win over Mexico when he scored 20 points and grabbed 7 rebounds.
