= Osiris Eldridge =

American basketball player (born 1988)

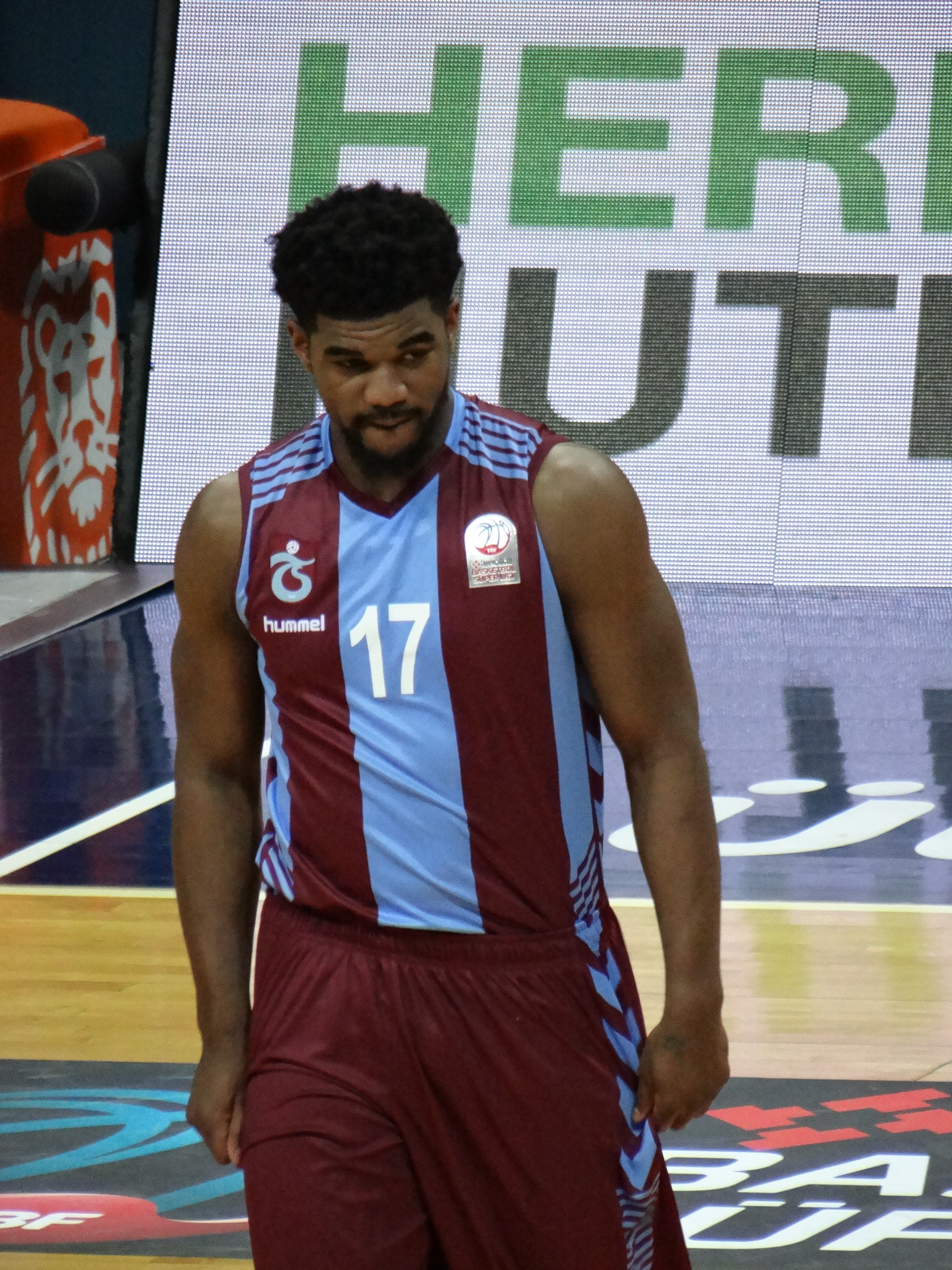

No. 0 – Al Arabi SC
- Position: Point guard / shooting guard
- League: Qatari Basketball League

Personal information
- Born: June 18, 1988 (age 38) Chicago, Illinois, U.S.
- Listed height: 6 ft 3 in (1.91 m)
- Listed weight: 190 lb (86 kg)

Career information
- High school: Wendell Phillips Academy (Chicago, Illinois)
- College: Illinois State (2006–2010)
- NBA draft: 2010: undrafted
- Playing career: 2010–present

Career history
- 2010–2011: Pınar Karşıyaka
- 2011–2012: Bakersfield Jam
- 2012: Boulazac BD
- 2013: S.Oliver Baskets
- 2013–2015: Denizli Basket
- 2015–2017: Tüyap Büyükçekmece B.K.
- 2017–2018: Trabzonspor
- 2018–2021: Büyükçekmece
- 2023–2024: Harem Spor
- 2025: Central Club
- 2025–present: Al Arabi SC

Career highlights
- 3× First-team All-MVC (2008–2010); MVC Freshman of the Year (2007); MVC tournament MVP (2009)

Osiris Eldridge (born June 18, 1988) is an American professional basketball player for Al Arabi SC of the Qatari Basketball League. He played college basketball for Illinois State. As a freshman, he won the Missouri Valley Conference Freshman of the Year award, and as a sophomore, he was runner up in MVP honors while leading ISU to its most wins in school history with 25.

== Phillips Academy ==
As a junior, averaged 21 points, six rebounds, three assists and nearly five steals. As a senior, averaged 25 points, eight rebounds and three assists per game. Named first team all-city in 2006. A second team all-state selection by Illinois Hoops and was on the third team all-state by the Associated Press. Played in the 2005 Wallace Prather Jr. Memorial All-Star Classic, which features the top players from the adidas camp. The 2005 IHSA Class AA Slam Dunk Champion. Played in the 2006 Riverwar All-Star Game.

== Illinois State ==
Eldridge shooting a three pointer

=== Freshman ===
The 2007 Missouri Valley Conference Freshman of the Year averaged 9.5 points-and 4.5 rebounds-per-game. He was named Valley Newcomer of the Week February 26. His career-high 28 points at Creighton (Jan. 1) tied the third-highest single-game total by a freshman in Illinois State history. He also tied the school record with eight made three-pointers in the game at Creighton.

=== Sophomore ===
First-Team All-Missouri Valley Conference and the Larry Bird MVC Player of the Year runner-up. Averaged 15.8 points, 5.7 rebounds, 1.9 assists and 1.3 steals per game on a 43.2 field goal percentage. Two-time Missouri Valley Conference Player of the Week (Nov. 18, Feb. 18). Averaged a league-second-best 17.1 points per game to go along with 5.6 rebounds per game on a 47.2 shooting percentage in Valley play. Eldridge has given the Redbirds more confidence and more hype than ever. Eldridge has earned the nickname "King O" and looks to lead the Redbirds the NCAA tournament for the first time since 1998.

The Illinois State men's basketball team has been projected to finish third in the Missouri Valley Conference, according to the 2008–09 preseason poll determined by a panel of league sports information directors, head coaches and media members. Junior guard Osiris Eldridge was also tabbed as the league's preseason player of the year, after finishing second in the 2008 Larry Bird Missouri Valley Conference Player of the Year voting. the league's preseason player of the year, Eldridge was also one of five Valley student-athletes named to the league's preseason all-conference team. As a first-team All-Missouri Valley Conference selection last season, Eldridge averaged 15.8 points, 5.7 rebounds, 1.9 assists and 1.3 steals per game.

The Chicago native posted 30 double-digit scoring outputs during the 2007–08 season, including nine games with 20 or more points. He scored a career-high 34 points at Indiana State last season, and posted his first-career double-doubles at Eastern Michigan and Bowling Green.

=== Junior ===
Joining Eldridge on the Valley's Preseason All-Conference Team were Drake's Jonathan Cox and Josh Young; Southern Illinois' Bryan Mullins; and Creighton's P'Allen Stinnett. Evansville's Shy Ely and Jason Holsinger received honorable mention honors, along with Bradley's Andrew Warren and Theron Wilson.

Eldridge averaged 34.8mpg and 14ppg. Also led the team in steals at 1.5 per game. He took the redbirds to the championship game of the MVC tournament but lost in overtime to Northern Iowa.

Named the 2009 State Farm Missouri Valley Conference tournament Most Outstanding Player, only the second player in league history to receive the award from a member of the runner-up team. Earned First-Team All-Missouri Valley Conference honors. Selected to the Valley's All-Defensive Team. Scored the 1,000th point of his career at Central Michigan. Received the 2008–09 Bob and Audrey Weber Endowed Scholarship in June 2008.

He decided to enter his name in the 2009 NBA draft but did not hire an agent so he could still retain his right to return to school the next season. He later opted out and dropped his name from the list to return to school.

=== Senior ===
Eldridge went into his senior season as the preseason favorite for Missouri Valley Player of the Year by Blue Ribbon Yearbook. He led the conference in scoring, averaging 15.9 points a game. Adam Koch of Northern Iowa won the Missouri Valley Player of the Year award.

== Professional career ==
Eldridge was drafted by the Dakota Wizards in the 2011 NBA D-League Draft. He has played in France (Gravelines Dunkerque and Boulazac Basket), Germany (s Oliver Baskets), and Turkey (Pinar Karsiyaka, Trabzonspor and Denizli Basket). Eldridge signed with Büyükçekmece Basketbol of the Turkish Basketball Super League in 2018. He re-signed with the team on August 11, 2020.

== Stats ==
=== College career ===
Year	Team	GP	GS	MPG	FG%	3P%	FT%	RPG	APG	SPG	BPG	PPG
06–07	ISU	31	13	23.5	.383	.377	.788	4.5	1.1	1.0	.06	9.5
07–08	ISU	35	33	31.0	.432	.385	.729	5.7	1.9	1.3	.3	15.8
08–09	ISU	34	33	34.8	.404	.353	.698	6.2	2.4	1.5	.4	14.0
09–10	ISU	33	33	33.4	.400	.354	.797	4.0	2.5	1.5	.3	15.5
Career		133	112	30.8	.408	.367	.751	5.1	2.0	1.4	.3	13.8

== The Basketball Tournament ==
In 2017, Eldridge played for the Kentucky Kings of The Basketball Tournament. The Basketball Tournament is an annual $2 million winner-take-all tournament broadcast on ESPN. In TBT 2018, he played for Eberlein Drive. Eberlein Drive made it to the championship game, where they lost to Overseas Elite.

== Honors and awards ==
- 2007 Missouri Valley Conference Freshman of the Year
- 2008 First-Team Missouri Valley Conference
- 2009 State Farm Missouri Valley Conference tournament Most Outstanding Player
- 2009 First-Team Missouri Valley Conference
- 2009 Missouri Valley Conference All-Defensive Team

Valley Player of the Week – Dec. 1, 2008; Jan. 5, 2009; Feb. 16, 2009; Nov. 18, 2007; Feb. 18, 2008
