= Naseim Badrush =

Libyan basketball player (born 1998)

No. 7 – Al Ahli Tripoli
- Position: Guard
- League: Libyan Division I Basketball League

Personal information
- Born: October 13, 1998 (age 27)
- Listed height: 1.89 m (6 ft 2 in)

Career history
- 2018–present: Al Ahli Tripoli
- 2021: Shaa'b Ibb
- 2023: Dijlah University

Career highlights
- BAL champion (2025); 3× Libyan D1 champion (2021, 2022, 2024); Libyan D1 MVP (2023); 2× Libyan Cup winner (2018, 2021)

Naseim Ismail Salem Badrush (Arabic: نسيم بدروش; born October 13, 1998) is a Libyan professional basketball guard who plays for Al Ahli Tripoli in the Libyan Division 1 and has featured in the Basketball Africa League. He is also a key member of the Libya national team. Standing at approximately 1.89 m (6 ft 2 in or 6 ft 3 in), Badrush brings skill and playmaking to his squad.

== Professional career ==
Badrush began his career with Al Ahli Tripoli, competing in the Libyan Division 1. He won the championship in 2021 and 2022, as well as the Libyan Cup in 2018 and 2021. He also played for a short stint with Shaa'b Ibb in Yemen for the 2021 Arab Club Basketball Championship. He did the same in 2023, with Iraqi club Dijlah University for the 2023 Arab Club Basketball Championship.

Badrush was named the Libyan Division 1 MVP during the 2022–23 season.

participating in the Basketball Africa League (BAL). During the 2024–25 BAL season, he averaged approximately 9.9 points, 3.8 rebounds, and 3.4 assists per game over ten matches. On June 14, 2025, he won the BAL championship with Al Ahli.

== National team career ==
Badrush has been an active contributor to the Libya national team, particularly during the AfroBasket 2025 qualifiers. In the final round of Group B in February 2025, he averaged 14.2 points, 2.6 rebounds, and 8.4 assists over five games. In the concluding game of the qualifiers, Badrush led Libya with 17 points to help secure a 69–66 victory over Uganda and qualified the team for AfroBasket 2025.

== Personal ==
Badrush is also a dentist.
