= SunBet Arena =

Multi-purpose indoor arena in Pretoria, South Africa

SunBet Arena at Time Square

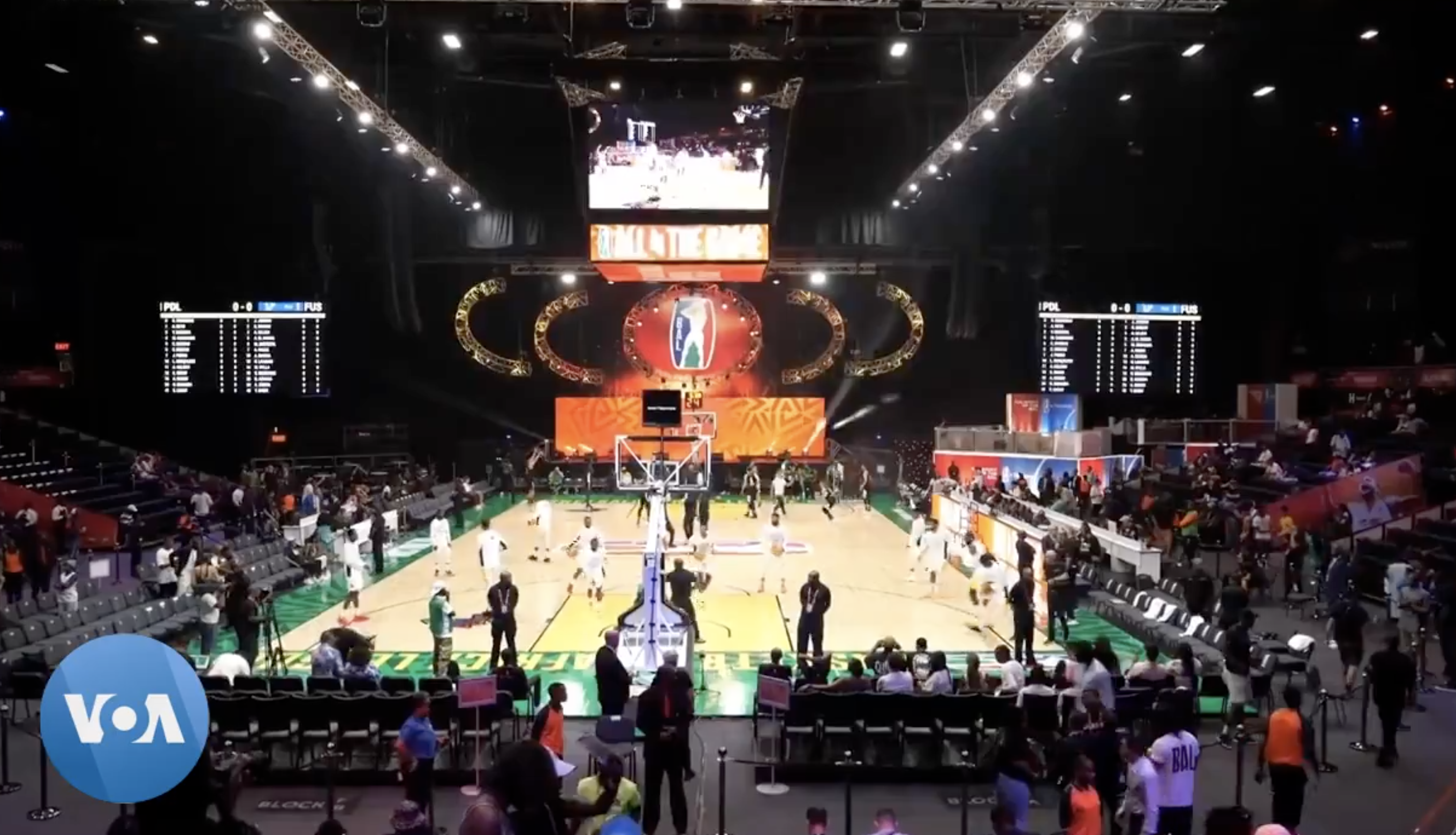
- Interior of the SunBet Arena during the Basketball Africa League
- Interactive map of SunBet Arena at Time Square
- Full name: SunBet Arena at Times Square
- Address: 209 Aramist Ave, Waterkloof Glen; Pretoria; South Africa
- Coordinates: 25.788747°S 28.282252°E
- Owner: Sun International
- Operator: Sun International
- Capacity: 8,500 (sporting events); 10,000 (standing concerts)
- Executive suites: 4

Construction
- Built: April 2015–2017
- Opened: 4 November 2017
- Cost: R4.2 billion (US$330 million)

SunBet Arena, also known as the Sun Arena at Times Square, is a multi-purpose indoor arena based within the Menlyn Maine precinct in Waterkloof Glen in Pretoria, Tshwane, South Africa. Opened in 2017, the arena is owned by hotel and gaming group Sun International and located at the Time Square Casino.

The arena has a capacity of 8,500 people for sporting events and seated concerts, and 10,000 for standing concerts. Sun International invested R4.2 billion (approximately $330 million at the time). The arena was opened on 4 November 2017 with the Unison Celebration Show as its first event.

The SunBet Arena has hosted International Artists such as Bryan Adams, UB40, Robbie Williams, Mariah the Scientist, Bebe Winans, Ne-Yo, Doja Cat, LIVE, James Blunt, The Lumineers, Boyz II Men, Babyface, Dave The Boy Who Played the Harp, Kirk Whalum, Kenny G, Calum Scott, The Corrs, Lord of the Dance, Sting, Roxette, Lauren Diangle, Mike & the Mechanics, Real McCoy, Vengaboys, 24 Seven, 2 Unlimited, Kool & the Gang, Bonnie Tyler, Blackstreet, Ronan Keating, Westlife, Backstreet Boys, Johnny Gill, Anthony Hamilton, Kenny Lattimore, Dru Hill, Engelbert Humperdink, Modern Talking, Joe Thomas, Rednex, Reel 2 Real, Rozalla, and Andrea Bocelli since opening in 2017.

== Construction ==
The Time Square project at Menlyn Maine was announced by hotel and gaming group Sun International. Construction of the entire project began in April 2015. The R 4.2 billion projects also included the second-largest casino in South Africa, as well as a hotel and restaurant.

The project won the award for overall best project at the Southern African Institute of Steel Construction (SAISC) Steel Awards in 2018.

== Sporting events ==
The SunBet Arena hosted the NBA Africa Game 2018, the third NBA exhibition game that was held on the African continent. The arena was a venue of the Basketball Africa League (BAL) in March 2024, when it hosted the Kalahari Conference. In November 2024, it was announced that the arena would host the 2025 BAL Playoffs and Finals.

== See also ==
- List of indoor arenas in South Africa
