= Kendrick Ray =

American basketball player (born 1994)

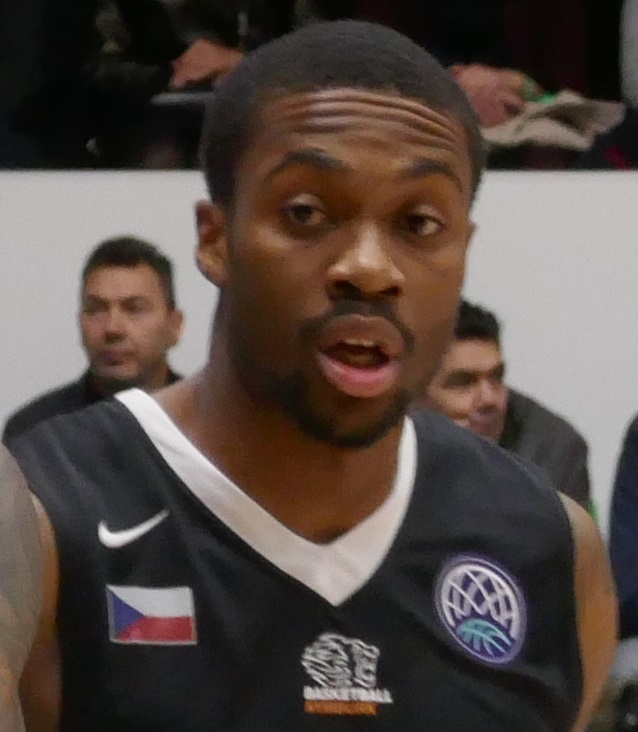
- Ray with ČEZ Nymburk in 2017

No. 0 – New Basket Brindisi
- Position: Shooting guard / point guard
- League: Serie A2

Personal information
- Born: January 26, 1994 (age 32) Bronx, New York, U.S.
- Listed height: 6 ft 2 in (1.88 m)
- Listed weight: 188 lb (85 kg)

Career information
- High school: Middletown (Middletown, New York)
- College: Quinnipiac (2012–2014); Kennesaw State (2015–2017)
- NBA draft: 2017: undrafted
- Playing career: 2017–present

Career history
- 2017–2018: ČEZ Nymburk
- 2018–2019: Maccabi Tel Aviv
- 2019: → Le Mans Sarthe
- 2019–2020: AEK Athens
- 2020–2021: Petkim Spor
- 2021–2022: Promitheas Patras
- 2022–2023: Igokea
- 2023: Reyer Venezia
- 2023: Taranaki Airs
- 2023–2024: Büyükçekmece Basketbol
- 2024: Fuerza Regia de Monterrey
- 2024–2025: Panionios
- 2025: Petro de Luanda
- 2025–2026: Mykonos
- 2026: Edmonton Stingers
- 2026–present: New Basket Brindisi

Career highlights
- Greek Cup winner (2020); Greek Cup Finals Top Scorer (2020); Czech League champion (2018); Czech League MVP (2018); Czech Cup winner (2018); FIBA Champions League Second Team (2018); First-team All-Atlantic Sun (2017); Second-team All-Atlantic Sun (2016); Atlantic Sun Newcomer of the Year (2016)

Kendrick John Ray (born January 26, 1994) is an American professional basketball player for New Basket Brindisi of the Italian Serie A2. He played college basketball for Quinnipiac University and Kennesaw State University before playing professionally in the Czech Republic, Israel, France, Turkey and Greece. Standing at 6 ft 2 in (1.88 m), Ray plays at the shooting guard and point guard positions.

== Early life and college career ==
Ray attended Middletown High School in Middletown, New York, where he averaged 17.0 points, 6.0 assists and 3.0 steals per game and leading the Bears to a Section 9 Championship in the 2011–12 season. Ray was ranked in top-20 among athletes at the Hoop Group Elite Basketball Camp in 2011.

Ray started his college career at Quinnipiac University. In his freshman year, he averaged 2.9 points, 1.1 rebounds 1.4 assists in 11 minutes per game as a point guard. On March 31, 2014, Ray was transferred from Quinnipiac to Kennesaw State, but sat out first season at Kennesaw State per NCAA Transfer rules.

In his junior year at Kennesaw State, Ray led the team and finishing second in the Atlantic Sun Conference averaging 18.7 points per game. He also led the team with 2.7 assists and was second on the team averaging 5.6 rebounds per game. Ray was named ASUN Newcomer of the Year and earned a spot in the Second-team ASUN.

In his senior year at Kennesaw State, Ray set the team single-season records with 656 points and averaging 21.2 points per game. Ray was also named to the ASUN All-Tournament Team after averaging 25.5 points per game and led the Owls to an ASUN Quarterfinal victory. On February 26, 2017, Ray became the first player in Kennesaw State history to be named First-team All-ASUN.

== Professional career ==
=== ČEZ Nymburk (2017–2018) ===
On July 24, 2017, Ray started his professional career with the Czech team ČEZ Nymburk, signing a one-year deal. On December 9, 2017, Ray recorded a career-high 31 points in only 23 minutes, shooting 12-of-16 from the field, along with six rebounds and five steals in a 130–66 blowout win over NH Ostrava. On January 23, 2018, Ray recorded a double-double of 24 points and 11 rebounds, shooting 9-of-18 from the field, along with three assists and two steals in an 81–77 win over Sidigas Avellino. He was subsequently earned a spot in the Champions League Team of the Week.

In 56 games played during the 2017–18 season (played in the Czech League and the Champions League), Ray averaged 14.1 points, 4.1 rebounds and 2.7 assists in 19.2 minutes per game. Ray won the 2018 Czech Cup and 2018 Czech League titles with Nymburk, as well as reaching the FIBA Champions League Round of 16, where they eventually were eliminated by AEK Athens. He was named Czech League MVP and earned a spot in the All-Champions League Second Team.

=== Maccabi Tel Aviv (2018–2019) ===
In June 2018, Ray joined the Utah Jazz for the 2018 NBA Summer League, where he averaged 6.6 points, 3.5 rebounds and 3 assists in 21.3 minutes per game.

On June 18, 2018, Ray joined the Israeli team Maccabi Tel Aviv of the EuroLeague, signing a two-year deal with an option for another one. On December 19, 2018, Ray recorded a EuroLeague career-high 17 points in only 13 minutes, shooting 5-of-5 from the field, in a 79–63 win over Khimki.

=== Le Mans (2019) ===
On February 26, 2019, Ray was loaned to Le Mans Sarthe of the French LNB Pro A for the rest of the season. On May 25, 2019, Ray recorded a season-high 22 points, shooting 8-of-11 from the field, along with four rebounds and three assists in a 67–73 loss to ASVEL Basket. In 15 Pro A League games played for Le Mans, he averaged 10.4 points, 1.7 rebounds and 1.3 assists in 21 minutes per game, while shooting 39.3 percent from three-point range.

On July 1, 2019, Ray joined the Boston Celtics for the 2019 NBA Summer League.

=== AEK Athens (2019–2020) ===
On August 10, 2019, Ray signed with the Greek Basket League team AEK Athens for the 2019–20 season.

=== Petkim Spor (2020–2021) ===
On July 18, 2020, he signed with Petkim Spor of the Turkish Basketball Super League.

=== Promitheas Patras (2021–2022) ===
On July 19, 2021, Ray signed with EuroCup side Promitheas Patras, returning to Greece. In 22 league games, he averaged 11.4 points, 3 rebounds, 4.4 assists and 0.9 steals, playing around 25 minutes per contest.

=== Igokea (2022–2023) ===
On July 15, 2022, Ray signed with Igokea of the Bosnian League, the ABA League and the Basketball Champions League.

=== Reyer Venezia (2023) ===
On February 1, 2023, Ray signed with Reyer Venezia of the Italian Lega Basket Serie A (LBA).

=== Taranaki Airs (2023) ===
After initially signing with the Canterbury Rams for the 2023 New Zealand NBL season, Ray joined the Taranaki Airs on June 1, 2023.

=== Büyükçekmece Basketbol (2023–2024) ===
On August 2, 2023, he signed with ONVO Büyükçekmece of the Basketbol Süper Ligi (BSL).

=== Fuerza Regia de Monterrey (2024) ===
On July 2, 2024, player signed with Fuerza Regia de Monterrey of the Liga Nacional de Baloncesto Profesional (LNBP).

=== Petro de Luanda (2025) ===
In June 2025, Ray joined Angolan champions Petro de Luanda for the playoffs of the Basketball Africa League (BAL).

== Personal life ==
Ray's older brother, Allan, is also a professional basketball player. His younger brother, Aaron, plays for Southern University.

== Career statistics ==
Legend
| GP | Games played | GS | Games started | MPG | Minutes per game |
| FG% | Field-goal percentage | 3P% | 3-point field-goal percentage | FT% | Free-throw percentage |
| RPG | Rebounds per game | APG | Assists per game | SPG | Steals per game |
| BPG | Blocks per game | PPG | Points per game | PIR | Performance index rating |
| **Bold** | Career high |

=== EuroLeague ===
| Year | Team | GP | GS | MPG | FG% | 3P% | FT% | RPG | APG | SPG | BPG | PPG | PIR |
|---|---|---|---|---|---|---|---|---|---|---|---|---|---|
| 2018–19 | Maccabi Tel Aviv | 17 | 0 | 11.0 | .438 | .458 | .667 | .8 | 1.1 | .1 | .1 | 4.7 | 3.1 |
| Career | | 17 | 0 | 11.0 | .438 | .458 | .667 | .8 | 1.1 | .1 | .1 | 4.7 | 3.1 |
