= Al Ahli Tripoli (basketball) =

- 2024–25 Al Ahli Tripoli basketball season
- League: Libyan Division 1 BAL
- Founded: 1950; 76 years ago
- History: Al Ahli SC (1950–present)
- Arena: Great Hall
- Capacity: 15,000
- Location: Tripoli, Libya
- Team colors: Green, Black, White and Yellow
- Chairman: Mohammed Al Mashai
- Head coach: Fouad Abou Chakra
- Championships: 1 BAL; 8 Libyan Leagues; 5 Libyan Cups; 3 Libyan Supercups

Al Ahli SC, also known as Al Ahli Tripoli, is a Libyan basketball team based in Tripoli. It is the basketball section of the multi-sports club with the same name. Al Ahli has won the Libyan Basketball League eight times, with its last title being in 2024, as well as five Libyan Cups and two Super Cups.

Al Ahli made its debut in the Basketball Africa League (BAL) in the 2025 season, and immediately won their first championship, their first continental title.

The home arena of the team is the Great Hall, which is a 15,000-seater in the city of Tripoli.

== History ==
The team was founded in 1950.

Al Ahli has competed in the Arab Club Basketball Championship three times, and reached the quarterfinals on two occasions, in 2015 and 2019.

As the champions of the 2023–24 Libyan League, Al Ahli played in the Road to BAL in the end of 2024. On November 9, 2024, they qualified for the 2025 BAL season, by defeating ABC Fighters in the semifinal. In the league season, they finished undefeated in the group phase, and would win the BAL championship, after defeating Petro de Luanda in the final. Fouad Abou Chakra won the Coach of the Year Award, while Jean Jacques Boissy was named the league MVP. In the 2024–25 season domestic season, however, Tripoli lost to Al Ahly Benghazi and thus was not eligible to defend its BAL title in the 2025–26 season.

As the African continental champions, Al Ahli played in the 2025 FIBA Intercontinental Cup in Singapore, and won the bronze medal, becoming the first African team to finish on the podium.

Various internationally renowned players have played for Al Ahli, including Terrell Stoglin, Walter Hodge and Anas Mahmoud.

== Honours ==
=== National ===
Libyan Division I Basketball League

- Champions (8): 1966–67, 1968–69, 1970–71, 1985–86, 2000–01, 2013–14, 2020–21, 2021–22, 2023–24
- Runners-up (5): 2007–08, 2010–11, 2016–17, 2017–18, 2022–23

Libyan Cup

- Winners (5): 1976–77, 2001–02, 2017–18, 2020–21, 2024–25

Libyan Super Cup

- Winners (4): 2018, 2021, 2024, 2025

=== International ===
Basketball Africa League (BAL)

- Champions (1): 2025

Road to BAL

- Division Champions (1): 2025

FIBA Intercontinental Cup

- Third Place (1): 2025

Arab Club Basketball Championship

- Quarterfinalist (2): 2015, 2019

== Players ==
=== Current roster ===
As of 1 September 2025

Note: Flags indicate national team, as has been defined under FIBA eligibility rules. Players may hold more than one non-FIBA nationality.

2024–25 Al Ahli Tripoli roster
No.	Pos.	Nat.	Player
0	G	(Libya) LBA	Mohamed Daw
1	F	(Libya) LBA	Fathi Mohsen
2	PG	(Syria) SYR	Keron DeShields
5	G	(Senegal) SEN	Jean Jacques Boissy
7	SG	(Libya) LBA	Naseim Badrush
8	G	(Libya) LBA	Ali Abdelrahman
10	F	(Libya) LBA	Abdulajabar Aboufardah
11	PG	(Libya) LBA	Bakeer Fellah
15	C	(Libya) LBA	Wajdi Dawo
22	G	(Libya) LBA	Ahmed Alsawadiq
23	PF	(Libya) LBA	Ghayth Almaghribi
30	PG	(Libya) LBA	Mahmoud Benalhaj
41	C	(Libya) LBA	Mohammed Mohammed
43	SG	(Libya) LBA	Muhsin Alakrimi

=== Notable players ===
Note: Flags indicate national team eligibility at FIBA-sanctioned events. Players may hold other non-FIBA nationalities not displayed.

Criteria

To appear in this section a player must have either:

- Set a club record or won an individual award while at the club
- Played at least one official international match for their national team at any time
- Played at least one official NBA match at any time.

- (Puerto Rico) (United States Virgin Islands) Walter Hodge
- (United States) Xavier Cannefax
- (Egypt) Anas Mahmoud
- (United States) Terrell Stoglin
- (Libya) Wajdi Dawo
