= 2025 Nationale 1 Masculin season =

2025 Nationale 1 season
- League: Nationale 1 Masculin
- Sport: Basketball
- Number of teams: 16

Finals
- Champions: ASC Ville de Dakar (2nd title)
- Runners-up: JA
- Finals MVP: Bara Ndiaye

Seasons
- ← 2024 2026 →

The 2025 Nationale 1 (N1) season was the 58th season of the Nationale 1 (NM1), the top-tier basketball league for men's teams in Senegal.

ASC Ville de Dakar were the defending champions, and successfully defended their title. As champions, they directly qualified for the 2026 BAL season.

== Teams ==
=== Promotion and relegation ===
ABAZ promoted after defeating Espoir Basket Academy in the semi-final of the Nationale 2 promotion tournament, and will make its N1 debut. RS Yoff promoted after defeating GNBC de Yeumbeul in the other semi-final, and will make its N1 debut as well.

US Ouakam and SIBAC were both relegated after finishing in the last two places of the play-down of the previous season.

=== Locations ===
Team	Location
ABAZ	
AS Douanes	Dakar
ASC Ville de Dakar	Dakar
ASC Thiès	Thiès
Bopp	Dakar
DUC Dakar	Dakar
Guédiawaye Academy	Dakar
Jeanne d'Arc	Dakar
Larry Diouf	Dakar
Louga	Louga
Mermoz	Dakar
RS Yoff	Dakar (Yoff)
UGB	Saint-Louis
USCT Port	Dakar
US Rail	Thiès
USPA	Dakar (Parcelles Assainies Arrondissement)

== Final Four ==
Semifinals
JA	72	76	2
GBA	64	58	0
ASC Ville de Dakar	63	53	72	2
AS Douanes	42	56	64	1

Finals
ASC Ville de Dakar	62	69	2
JA	58	56	0

== Individual awards ==
2025 N1 Masculin awards
Award	Winner	Team
Finals MVP	Bara Ndiyae	ASC Ville de Dakar
Finals Top Scorer	Bara Ndiyae	ASC Ville de Dakar
Finals Top Rebounder	Makhtar Gueye	ASC Ville de Dakar
Finals Top Assists	Saliou Gueye	ASC Ville de Dakar
