= Nationale 1 Feminin =

Senegalese basketball league

Nationale 1 Feminin (N1F)
- Country: Senegal
- Confederation: FIBA Africa
- Number of teams: 8
- Level on pyramid: 1
- Relegation to: Nationale 2 Feminin
- Domestic cup: Senegalese Cup
- Supercup: Senegalese Super Cup
- International cup: FIBA Africa Women's Basketball League
- Current champions: ASCVD (5th title) (2024)

The Nationale 1 Feminin (abbreviated as NF1 or N1 Feminin; in English: National 1 Women) is the highest level women's basketball league in Senegal. The league exists of eight teams as of the 2024 season.

Each season is finished with a final in a single-game elimination format, held at the Marius Ndiaye Stadium in Dakar.

The champions of the NM1 qualify directly for the FIBA Africa Women's Basketball League, the top-level continental league.

== Teams ==
The following 8 teams played in the 2024 season:

Team	Location
ASC Ville de Dakar	Dakar
Bopp	Dakar
DBC	Dakar
Debaloc	Dakar
DUC	Dakar
Cemt ZIG	Dakar
GBA	Guédiawaye
Jeanne d'Arc	Dakar

== Recent finals ==
Including finals since the 2021 season.

Year	Winner	Runner-up	Score	Notes
2021	ASCVD	DUC	71–68	
2022	ASCVD	DUC	58–40	
2023	ASCVD	Jeanne d'Arc	60–36	
2024	ASCVD	DUC	75–41	

== Performance by club ==
Teams shown in italics are no longer in existence.

Club	Winners	Runners-up	Seasons won	Seasons runners-up
ASCVD	5	0	2020, 2021, 2022, 2023, 2024	
DUC	0	3		2021, 2022, 2024
Jeanne d'Arc	0	1		2023

== Individual awards ==
=== Queen of the Season (Most Valuable Player) ===
The Queen of the Season Award (in French: Reine du Saison) is given each year to the best performing player of the N1 season.

Season	Winner	Team	Ref.
2024	Madjiguéne Séne	ASCVD	

=== Revelation of the Year ===
Season	Winner	Team	Ref.
2024	Aminata Ndong	GBA	
