= 2023 AS Douanes men's basketball season =

AS Douanes
- Nationale Masculin 1 champions
- Chairman: Colonel Cheikh Diop
- Head coach: Pabi Guèye
- NM1: Champions
- BAL: Runners-up (Lost to Al Ahly)
- Senegalese Cup: Unknown
- Saint Michel Cup: Winners

The AS Douanes men's basketball team played the 2023 season in the Nationale 1 (NM1) and the Basketball Africa League (BAL). Having won the previous national championship, the Douanes returned to the BAL after one-year of absence. They signed Terrell Stoglin and Chris Crawford for the season as American import players. On 27 September 2023, AS Douanes won its record-setting 11th national championship, thus overtaking ASFA as the Senegalese club with the most NM1 titles.

In the BAL, the Douanes finished second in the Sahara Conference after they won three straight games to make up for a 0–2 start. In the playoffs they became the first Senegalese team to reach the finals, when they defeated Petro de Luanda in the semifinal. They lost in the final to Al Ahly. Pabi Guèye won the BAL Coach of the Year Award.

On 7 May, AS Douanes also won their 5th Saint Michel Cup.

== Rosters ==
=== BAL roster ===
AS Douanes roster
Players
Coaches

Pos.	No.	Nat.	Name	Ht.	Age	From
PG	00	(Senegal)	Ndour, Alkaly (C)	1.93 m (6 ft 4 in)	29 – 2 March 1997
SG	1	(United States)	Crawford, Chris (I)	1.94 m (6 ft 4 in)	34 – 30 September 1992
SF	2	(Senegal)	Fall, Samba Daly	2.03 m (6 ft 8 in)	27 – 17 January 1999
C	4	(South Sudan)	Maluach, Khaman (E)	2.18 m (7 ft 2 in)	20 – 13 September 2006
G	5	(Senegal)	Boissy, Jean Jacques	1.83 m (6 ft 0 in)	25 – 28 January 2001
SF	7	(Senegal)	Diop, Bara	2.01 m (6 ft 7 in)	34 – 14 August 1992
SG	10	(Senegal)	Dieng, Madiara	1.96 m (6 ft 5 in)	30 – 20 November 1995
PF	11	(Ghana)	Osei, Bryan (I)	2.06 m (6 ft 9 in)	38 – 9 May 1988
SF	12	(Senegal)	Ndiaye, Bara	2.05 m (6 ft 9 in)	23 – 6 October 2003
F/C	15	(Senegal)	Diagne, Mouhamadou		29 – 18 January 1997
SF	23	(Senegal)	Kamara, Cheikh Ahmet	1.98 m (6 ft 6 in)	32 – 14 February 1994
C	34	(Nigeria)	Ochereobia, Ifeanyichukwu (I)	1.96 m (6 ft 5 in)	37 – 27 July 1989
SG	41	(United States)	Stoglin, Terrell (I)	1.85 m (6 ft 1 in)	34 – 10 November 1991

Head coach

- (Senegal) Pabi Guèye

Assistant coach(es)

- (Senegal) Parfait Advijon

Legend

- (C) Team captain
- Injured

- Roster

== Transactions ==
=== In ===
No.	Pos.	Nat.	Name	Age	Moving from		Type	Ends	Date	Source
5	G	(Senegal)	Jean Jacques Boissy	21	Cornellà	(Spain)	Free agent	2023		
41	G	(United States)	Terrell Stoglin	31	Al-Ittihad Aleppo	(Syria)	Free agent	May 2023 (BAL only)	January 20, 2023	
1	SG	(United States)	Chris Crawford	30	Patriots	(Rwanda)	Free agent	May 2023 (BAL only)	January 20, 2023	
11	PF/C	(Ghana)	Bryan Osei	34	Free agent		Free agent	May 2023 (BAL only)	February 6, 2023	
4	C	(South Sudan)	Khaman Maluach	16	NBA Academy Africa	(Senegal)	Drafted	May 2023 (BAL only)	February 28, 2023	
34	C	(Nigeria)	Ifeanyichukwu Ochereobia	33	Cheshire Phoenix	(United Kingdom)	Free agent	May 2023 (BAL only)	March 1, 2023	

== Competitions ==
=== Basketball Africa League ===
==== Sahara Conference ====
11 March 2023 1	AS Douanes (Senegal)	70–76	(Ivory Coast) ABC Fighters	Dakar Arena, Dakar
16:00	Scoring by quarter: 14–25, 17–18, 17–15, 22–18
	Pts: Stoglin 21; Rebs: Maluach 9 Asts: Crawford, Ndour 4	Boxscore	Pts: Harouna 25; Rebs: Obekpa 9 Asts: Obekpa, Robinson 5	Attendance: 9,873; Referees: Charles Watson, Antonio Bernardo, Kalume Tonton Banza

15 March 2023 2	REG (Rwanda)	69–55	(Senegal) AS Douanes	Dakar Arena, Dakar
19:30	Scoring by quarter: 25–12, 17–12, 15–12, 12–19
	Pts: Nshobozwabyosenumukiza 14; Rebs: Nshobozwabyosenumukiza 10; Asts: Thomas 6	Boxscore	Pts: Crawford 17; Rebs: Crawford 9 Asts: Stoglin 5	Attendance: 4,010; Referees: Kevin Fahy, Sara Elsharnouby, Claudio Eiuba

17 March 2023 3	AS Douanes (Senegal)	74–58	(Mali) Stade Malien	Dakar Arena, Dakar
19:30	Scoring by quarter: 21–17, 12–12, 14–13, 27–16
	Pts: Crawford 21; Rebs: Ndiaye 8 Asts: Ndour 5	Boxscore	Pts: Berthe 17; Rebs: Diarra 14; Asts: Mamadou Keita 4	Attendance: 3,059

18 March 2023 4	Kwara Falcons (Nigeria)	68–75	(Senegal) AS Douanes	Dakar Arena, Dakar
17:30	Scoring by quarter: 17–20, 18–21, 12–16, 21–16
	Pts: Ezeh 12; Rebs: Mordi 7 Asts: Mordi 4	Boxscore	Pts: Boissy 22; Rebs: Diagne 6 Asts: Crawford 6	Attendance: 6,571; Referees: Kevin Fahy, Sara Elsharnouby, Didier Gaga

21 March 2023 5	US Monastir (Tunisia)	60–76	(Senegal) AS Douanes	Dakar Arena, Dakar
19:30	Scoring by quarter: 10–22, 22–10, 12–14, 16–20
	Pts: Lahyani 15; Rebs: Slimane 9 Asts: Bouallegue, Slimane 3	Livestats	Pts: Crawford 28; Rebs: Boissy, Ochereobia 7 Asts: Ndour 5	Attendance: 6,761; Referees: Charles Watson, Aboolo Amr, Didier Gaga

==== Playoffs ====
===== Quarterfinals =====
22 May 2023	AS Douanes (Senegal)	93–73	(Mozambique) Ferroviário da Beira	BK Arena, Kigali
17:00	Scoring by quarter: 28–23, 24–14, 19–15, 22–21
	Pts: Fall 23; Rebs: Bryan-Amaning 11; Asts: Ndour 8	Report; Livestats	Pts: Gueye 19; Rebs: Gueye 9 Asts: Perry 8	Attendance: 2,240; Referees: JD Ralls, Banza Kalume, Sara Elsharnouby

===== Semifinals =====
24 May 2023	Petro de Luanda (Angola)	86–92	(Senegal) AS Douanes	BK Arena, Kigali
17:00	Scoring by quarter: 19–20, 26–29, 18–20, 23–23
	Pts: Hollis 19; Rebs: Pedro 8 Asts: Pedro 6	Livestats	Pts: Boissy 28; Rebs: Crawford 7 Asts: Ndour 5	Attendance: 4,554; Referees: Marcy Williams, Jean Sauveur Ruhamiriza, Mbaye Seye

===== Final =====
27 May 2023	Al Ahly (Egypt)	80–65	(Senegal) AS Douanes	BK Arena, Kigali
18:00	Scoring by quarter: 17–10, 21–23, 25–13, 17–19
	Pts: Omot 22; Rebs: Fakuade 10; Asts: Seif 4	Livestats	Pts: Boissy 20; Rebs: Ochereobia 9 Asts: Ndour 4	Attendance: 7,532; Referees: JD Ralls, Yann Vezo Davidson, Arnold Moseya

== Awards ==
Date	Player	Award
26 May 2023	Pabi Guèye	BAL Coach of the Year
27 May 2023	Jean Jacques Boissy	All-BAL First Team
27 May 2023	Chris Crawford	All-BAL First Team

== Player statistics ==
Legend
GP	Games played	GS	Games started	MPG	Minutes per game
FG%	Field-goal percentage	3P%	3-point field-goal percentage	FT%	Free-throw percentage
RPG	Rebounds per game	APG	Assists per game	SPG	Steals per game
BPG	Blocks per game	PPG	Points per game

=== BAL ===
After all games.

AS Douanes statistics
Player	GP	MPG	FG%	3FG%	FT%	RPG	APG	SPG	BPG	PPG
Adama Diakhite	3	14.7	.400	.000	.700	2.7	0.0	1.3	0.0	6.3
Alkaly Ndour	8	21.5	.313	.000	.167	3.1	4.4	1.4	0.1	2.6
Bara Diop	7	12.5	.320	.000	.000	2.4	0.4	0.4	0.0	2.3
Bara Ndiaye	7	14.7	.313	.000	.500	3.7	0.3	0.3	0.3	3.7
Samba Daly Fall	8	21.6	.389	.333	.375	3.9	1.4	1.5	0.1	6.3
Bryan Osei	5	16.9	.444	1.000	.308	3.4	0.6	0.8	0.2	7.4
Cheikh Ahmet Kamara	2	3.0	.000	.000	.000	0.0	0.0	0.0	0.0	0.0
Chris Crawford	8	34.1	.375	.319	.788	5.3	3.1	1.5	0.6	18.8
Jean Jacques Boissy	8	22.4	.333	.263	.850	4.0	3.5	2.4	0.1	16.5
Khaman Maluach	7	11.5	.346	.250	.667	4.4	0.4	0.3	0.4	3.4
Madiara Dieng	7	2.3	.154	.167	.000	0.4	0.0	0.0	0.0	0.9
Matthew Bryan-Amaning	3	24.2	.571	.667	.111	6.7	0.7	2.3	0.0	9.0
Mouhamadou Diagne	7	12.2	.647	.000	.500	4.4	0.3	0.0	1.1	3.7
Michael Ochereobia	8	18.9	.517	.000	.750	6.5	0.8	0.3	0.3	4.9
Pape Diop	3	4.8	1.000	.000	.500	1.0	0.0	0.3	0.0	2.0
Terrell Stoglin^{~}	2	28.9	.280	.100	.600	1.5	3.0	1.0	0.0	10.5

^{~} Waived during the season
