= 2023 BAL final =

Basketball Africa League season final

2023 BAL Final
- Promotional material for the final
- Event: 2023 BAL season
Al Ahly	AS Douanes
(Egypt)	(Senegal)
(6–1)	(5–2)
80	65
Head coach: Augustí Julbe	Head coach: Pabi Gueye
	1	2	3	4	Total
Al Ahly	17	21	25	17	80
AS Douanes	10	23	13	19	65
- Date: 27 May 2023
- Venue: BK Arena, Kigali, Rwanda
- MVP: Nuni Omot (Al Ahly)
- Favorite: Al Ahly (1.38)
- Attendance: 7,532
- Halftime show: Bruce Melodie; DJ Neptune; Pheelz

The 2023 BAL Final was the championship game of the 2023 BAL season, the third season of the Basketball Africa League (BAL), and concluded the playoffs. The final was played on 27 May 2023 in the BK Arena in Kigali, Rwanda, for a third year in a row. The final was contested by Egyptian club Al Ahly and Senegalese club AS Douanes.

Al Ahly won its first title after defeating AS Douanes 80–65 for their first BAL title and their second continental championship, following the FIBA Africa Club Champions Cup in 2016. Al Ahly head coach Augustí Julbe became the first coach to win two BAL championships, while Nuni Omot was named the league's Most Valuable Player (MVP) after the game.

As winners of the BAL, Al Ahly qualified for the 2023 FIBA Intercontinental Cup, in which they finished fourth.

== Teams ==
In the following table, finals in the FIBA Africa Clubs Champions Cup are in small text. Both teams made their first appearance in a BAL Final. Al Ahly had played in the FIBA ACC final three times before, and won once in 2016. AS Douanes had never appeared in a continental final, and were the first team to play in a continental final since Jeanne d'Arc 31 years before (in 1992).

Team	Previous final appearances (bold indicates winners)
(Egypt) Al Ahly	None 3 (2004, 2012, **2016**)
(Senegal) AS Douanes	None

== Venue ==
The BK Arena was used as the host arena for the playoffs and final for a third straight year, under an agreement the BAL made with the Rwandan Ministry of Sport.

Kigali	2023 BAL final (Africa)
BK Arena	2023 BAL final (Africa)
Capacity: 10,000	2023 BAL final (Africa)

== Road to the finals ==
Al Ahly		Round	AS Douanes	
Opponent	Result	Group phase	Opponent	Result
(Mozambique) Ferroviário da Beira	W 92–73	Round 1	(Ivory Coast) ABC Fighters	L 70–76
(Uganda) City Oilers	W 72–70	Round 2	(Rwanda) REG	L 69–55
(South Africa) Cape Town Tigers	W 91–70	Round 3	(Mali) Stade Malien	W 74–58
(Angola) Petro de Luanda	L 91–90	Round 4	(Nigeria) Kwara Falcons	W 75–68
(Guinea) SLAC	W 80–70	Round 5	(Tunisia) US Monastir	W 76–60
**Nile Conference second place**		Regular season	**Sahara Conference second place**	
Opponent	Result	Playoffs	Opponent	Result
(Rwanda) REG	W 94–77	Quarterfinals	(Mozambique) Ferroviário da Beira	W 93–73
(Mali) Stade Malien	W 78–73	Semifinals	(Angola) Petro de Luanda	W 92–86

== Background ==
=== Al Ahly ===
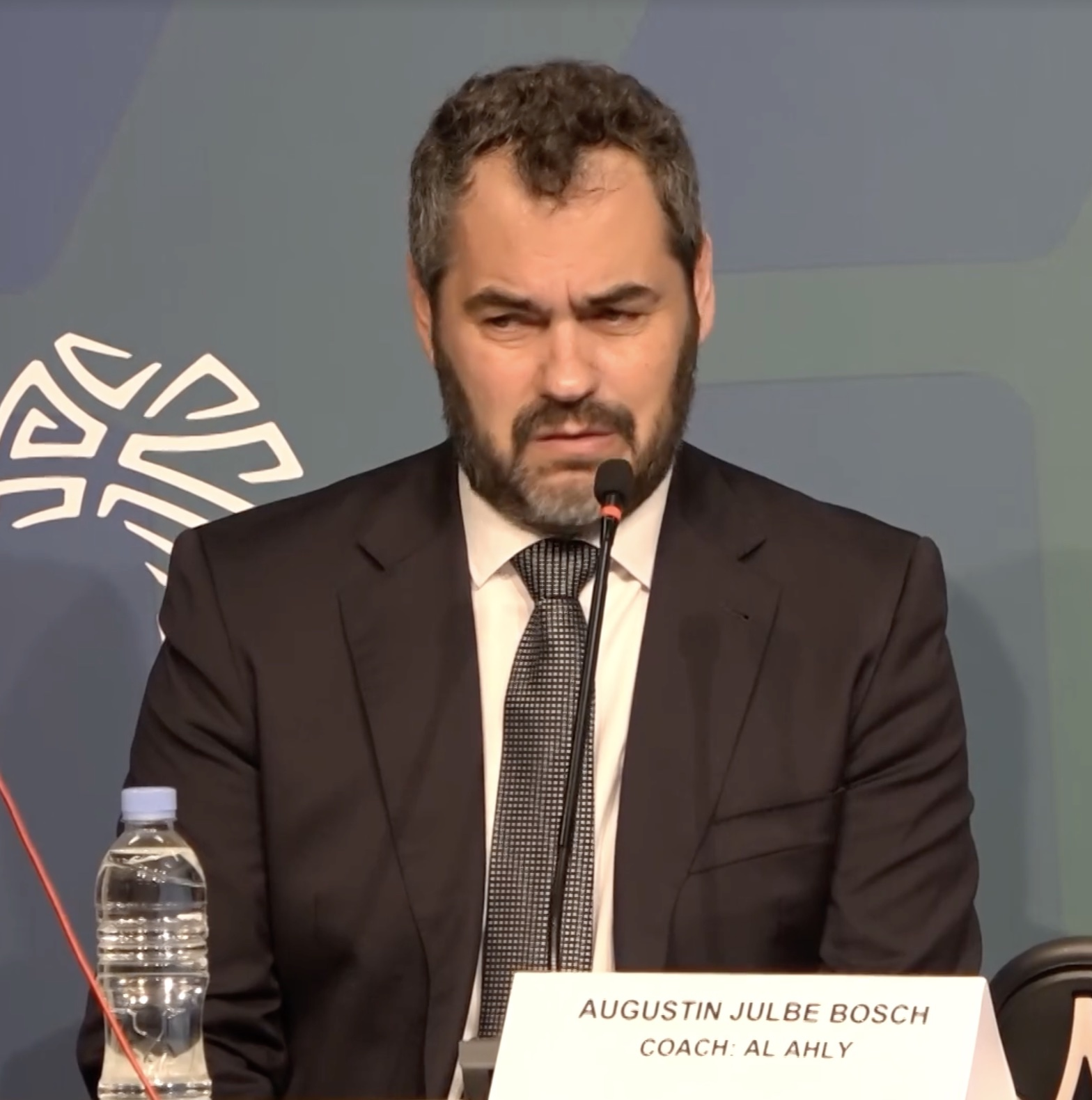
Augustí Julbe, champion of the 2021 BAL season, was the coach of Al Ahly

Al Ahly qualified directly for the 2023 season as they won the 2021–22 Egyptian Basketball Premier League, following their win over Al Ittihad Alexandria in the finals. A known team on the continental stage, this was their debut season in the BAL under the guidance of coach Augustí Julbe. Julbe had already won the BAL championship in 2021 with Zamalek. The team acquired South Sudanese forward Nuni Omot, as well as American point guard Michael Thompson, who came out of retirement for the BAL. In the Nile Conference, which was held in Cairo, Al Ahly won four out of five games. In the clash with Petro de Luanda, they lost on a buzzer-beater.

In between the group phase and playoffs of the BAL, Al Ahly won its seventh Egyptian title after they beat Al Ittihad Alexandria once again in the 2022–23 Egyptian Basketball Premier League.

Ahead of the playoffs, Al Ahly strengthened their roster with Michael Fakuade, who had already played for the team in 2021. After an easy quarter-final win over Rwandan club REG, Al Ahly defeated Malian club Stade Malien in the semi-final behind 21 points from Ehab Amin.

=== AS Douanes ===
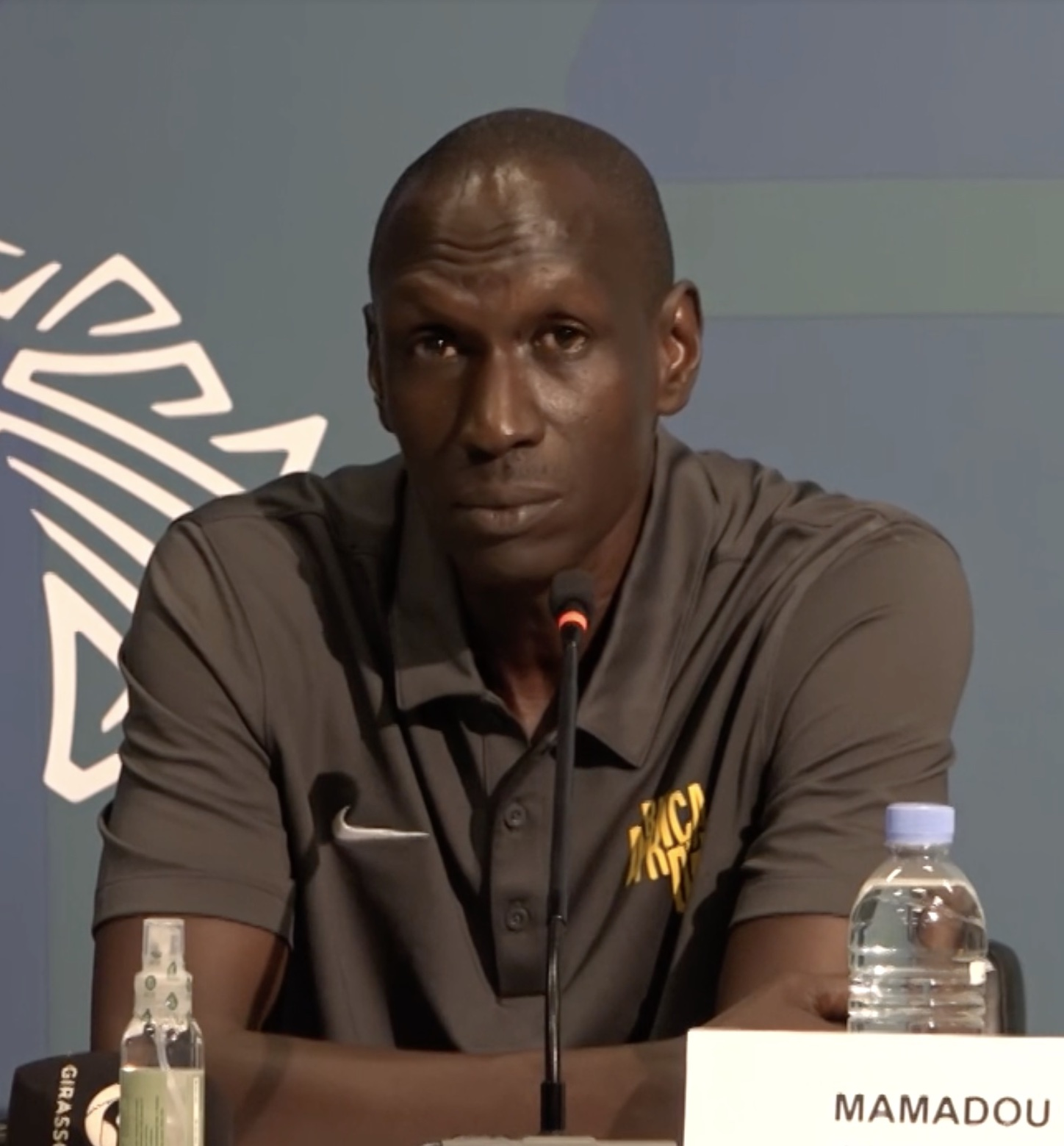
Pabi Gueye coached AS Douanes to their first BAL final after 10 years with the team

AS Douanes qualified directly for the 2023 season after they won the Senegalese championship in the 2022 Nationale 1 season, returning after a one-year absence from the league. Douanes, under the guidance of head coach Pabi Gueye since 2013, acquired Chris Crawford and Terrell Stoglin as American import players. Crawford had played two seasons in the BAL and Stoglin was the two-time BAL scoring champion.

The team lost the first two games of the season, after which the team released Stoglin from their roster. After this, Douanes won three straight games and was able to qualify for the playoffs after they defeated the defending champions US Monastir on the final game day. They eliminated Monastir as well, and advanced based on the tie-breaker between the five teams with a 3–2 record.

In the 2023 BAL Playoffs, Douanes easily cruised past Ferroviário da Beira, before facing the reigning runners-up Petro de Luanda in the semi-final. Behind 28 points from Jean Jacques Boissy and 26 points from Crawford, Douanes beat the Angolan team in what was widely considered to be a shocking win. On 26 May, one day before the final, Pabi Gueye was named the BAL Coach of the Year.

== Halftime performance ==
The halftime performance was provided by Bruce Melodie, Pheelz and DJ Neptune.

== Game ==
=== Summary ===
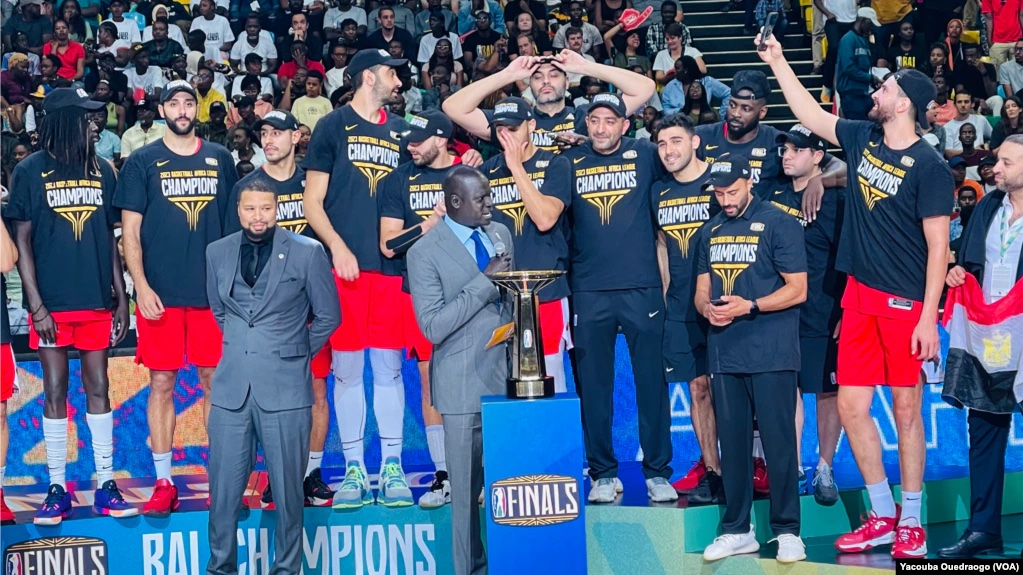
Al Ahly celebrating winning the title after the final

Khaman Maluach started the game for AS Douanes, he was the youngest player to start in a BAL championship game at age 16. Chris Crawford of AS Douanes opened the game with a three-pointer to put the Senegalese up 3–0. Al Ahly's Amr Zahran responded with a three-pointer as the Egyptians tied, as such AS Douanes' lead lasted 23 seconds as Al Ahly would not trail from that point. Following Nuni Omot scoring efforts, Al Ahly lead 17–10 after the low-s first quarter.

In the third quarter, the Egyptians broke away behind two three-pointers by Corey Webster and Ehab Amin that gave them a 13-point lead. The third quarter ended with a comfortable 17-point lead for Al Ahly at 63–46. AS Douanes scored just two three-pointers throughout the game and had a 6% shooting percentage, scoring only two of their 31 attempts. Chris Crawford, who was the Douanes' leading scorer coming into the final, was limited to just 9 points by the Al Ahly defence.

=== Details ===
27 May 2023
18:00

Livestats

**Al Ahly** (Egypt)	**80**–65	(Senegal) AS Douanes
Scoring by quarter: 17–10, 21–23, 25–13, 17–19
Pts: Omot 22; Rebs: Fakuade 10; Asts: Seif 4		Pts: Boissy 20; Rebs: Ochereobia 9 Asts: Ndour 4

BK Arena, Kigali
Attendance: 7,532
Referees: JD Ralls, Yann Vezo Davidson, Arnold Moseya

Starters:			Pts	Reb	Ast
PG	2	(United States) Michael Thompson	10	1	3
SG	45	(Egypt) Ehab Amin	9	8	3
SF	14	(Egypt) Amr Zahran	6	3	1
PF	7	(South Sudan) Nuni Omot	22	3	2
C	45	(Egypt) Omar Oraby	5	7	0
Reserves:					
F	6	(Egypt) Amr Gendy	2	1	0
F	10	(France) Dramane Camara	0	1	0
G	12	(Egypt) Omar Azab	0	0	0
G	15	(New Zealand) Corey Webster	13	4	2
F	23	(Egypt) Mohamed Abouelnasr	0	1	0
C	24	(Egypt) Saif Seid	2	5	4
F	28	(Nigeria) Michael Fakuade	7	10	3
C	34	(Egypt) Ahmed Ismail	4	5	1
Head coach:
(Spanish Basketball Federation) Augustí Julbe

**Al Ahly**	**AS Douanes**

Al Ahly	Statistics	Douanes
17/33 (51%)	2-pt field goals	19/45 (42%)
9/33 (27%)	3-pt field goals	2/31 (6%)
19/26 (73%)	Free throws	21/33 (63%)
18	Offensive rebounds	21
37	Defensive rebounds	26
55	Total rebounds	47
19	Assists	11
22	Turnovers	13
4	Steals	13
1	Blocks	1
26	Fouls	25

2023 BAL champions

**Al Ahly**
1st BAL title; 2nd continental title

Starters:			Pts	Reb	Ast
PG	00	(Senegal) Alkaly Ndour	0	3	4
SG	1	(United States) Chris Crawford	9	3	0
SF	2	(Senegal) Samba Daly Fall	6	2	4
PF	4	(South Sudan) Khaman Maluach	2	4	0
C	34	(Nigeria) Ifeanyichukwu Ochereobia	4	9	0
Reserves:					
G	5	(Senegal) Jean Jacques Boissy	20	3	3
F	7	(Senegal) Bara Diop	0	2	0
G	10	(Senegal) Madiara Dieng	3	1	0
C	11	(Ghana) Matthew Bryan-Amaning	0	3	3
F	12	(Senegal) Bara Ndiaye	0	1	1
C	15	(Senegal) Mouhamadou Diagne	3	4	0
C	28	(Senegal) Adama Diakhite	14	4	0
F	45	(Senegal) Pape Maguet Diop	4	2	0
Head coach:
(Fédération Sénégalaise de Basket-Ball) Pabi Gueye

== Post-game ==
Al Ahly became the third overall club, and the second Egyptian club to win the BAL title, following Zamalek in 2021. Augustí Julbe became the first coach to win two BAL titles, after his title with Zamalek in 2021. Forward Michael Fakuade became the second player to have won two BAL championships, following Solo Diabate.

Al Ahly's Nuni Omot, who scored a game-high 22 points in the final, was named the BAL Most Valuable Player after the game. AS Douanes guards Chris Crawford and Jean Jacques Boissy were named to the All-BAL First Team, becoming the first players from the club to be selected for this honour.

As winners of the final, Al Ahly qualified for the 2023 FIBA Intercontinental Cup Singapore. In the Intercontinental Cup, Al Ahly made history by becoming the first African team to win a game following their 21 September win over the NBA G League Ignite. They finished in the fourth place out of six teams.
