= 2023 Nationale 1 season =

- League: Nationale 1
- Sport: Basketball
- Duration: 21 January – 17 September 2023
- Number of teams: 16
- Season MVP: Samba Daly Fall (AS Douanes)
- Relegated to N2: ASFA; UCAD

Finals
- Champions: AS Douanes (11th title)
- Runners-up: Jeanne d'Arc
- Finals MVP: Samba Daly Fall (AS Douanes)

Seasons
- ← 2022 2024 →

The 2023 Nationale 1 season was the 56th season of the Nationale 1 (NM1), the top-tier basketball league in Senegal. The season began on 21 January and ended on 17 September 2023.

AS Douanes won its record-setting 11th national title, after defeating Jeanne d'Arc in the finals, overtaking the record that was jointly held with ASFA. The Douanes' forward Samba Daly Fall was named both MVP and Finals MVP of the season.

== Teams ==
=== Changes ===
▲ Promoted from Division 2	▼ Relegated from 2022 N1 season
Larry Diouf; UCAD	USPA; SLBC

=== Locations ===
Team	Location
AS Douanes	Dakar
ASCC Bopp	Dakar
ASC Thiès	Thiès
ASC Ville de Dakar	Dakar
ASFA	Dakar
DUC Dakar	Dakar
Jeanne d'Arc	Dakar
Larry Diouf	Ziguinchor
Louga	Louga
Mermoz	Dakar
SIBAC	Dakar (Sicap-Liberté)
UCAD	Dakar
UGB	Saint-Louis
US Rail	Thiès
US Ouakam	Dakar (Ouakam)

== Regular season ==
=== Group A ===
Pos	Team	Pld	W	L	Pts	Qualification or relegation
1	AS Douanes	14	14	0	28	Advance to playoffs
2	Louga BC	14	8	6	16	Advance to playoffs
3	US Ouakam	14	8	6	16	Advance to playoffs
4	UGB	13	6	7	12	Advance to playoffs
5	Mermoz	13	6	7	12	Qualification for play-down
6	ASC Bopp	14	5	9	10	Qualification for play-down
7	SIBAC	14	5	9	10	Qualification for play-down
8	ASFA	14	3	11	6	Qualification for play-down

=== Group B ===
Pos	Team	Pld	W	L	Pts	Qualification or relegation
1	JA	14	12	2	24	Advance to playoffs
2	ASC Ville de Dakar	13	11	2	22	Advance to playoffs
3	DUC	13	10	3	20	Advance to playoffs
4	Larry Diouf	14	6	8	12	Advance to playoffs
5	USCT Port	14	6	8	12	Qualification for play-down
6	US Rail	14	4	10	8	Qualification for play-down
7	UCAD SC	14	3	11	6	Qualification for play-down
8	ASC Thiès	14	3	11	6	Qualification for play-down

== Playoffs ==
Quarterfinals
A1	AS Douanes	2
B4	Larry Diouf	0
B2	ASCVD	2
A3	Louga	0
B1	Jeanne d'Arc	2
A4	UGB	1
A2	DUC	2
B3	US Ouakam	1

Semifinals
A1	AS Douanes	2
B2	ASC Ville de Dakar	0
B1	Jeanne d'Arc	2
A2	DUC	1

Finals
A1	AS Douanes	2
B1	Jeanne d'Arc	1

== Play-down ==
In the play-down round, all eight teams played each other team once. ASFA and UCAD, as the 7th- and 8th-ranked teams, were relegated to the Division 2.

2023 N1 Play-down standings
Pos	Team	Pld	W	L	PF	PA	PD	Pts	Relegation
1	ASC Bopp	22	9	13	1336	1394	−58	31	
2	Mermoz	22	9	13	1287	1335	−48	31	
3	SIBAC	22	9	13	1260	1356	−96	31	
4	USCT Port	22	9	13	1384	1494	−110	31	
5	ASC Thiès	22	8	14	1336	1473	−137	30	
6	US Rail	22	8	14	1393	1511	−118	30	
7	ASFA	22	8	14	1281	1429	−148	30	Relegated to Division 2
8	UCAD SC	22	6	16	1344	1552	−208	28	Relegated to Division 2

== Individual awards ==
- King of the Season (Most valuable player): Samba Daly Fall, AS Douanes
- Finals MVP: Samba Daly Fall, AS Douanes
- Relevation of the Year (Young player of the Year): Abdoulaye Dièye, DUC
- Coach of the Year: Pabi Guèye, AS Douanes
