= 2022 Nationale 1 season =

55th season of the Nationale Masculin 1

- League: Nationale 1
- Sport: Basketball
- Duration: 16 July – 16 October (Playoffs)
- Number of teams: 16
- Top seed: DUC
- Season MVP: Bara Ndiaye (DUC)
- Relegated to Nationale 2: USPA; SLBC

Finals
- Champions: AS Douanes (10th title)
- Runners-up: DUC
- Finals MVP: Samba Daly Fall (AS Douanes)

Seasons
- ← 2021 2023 →

The 2022 Nationale 1 season was the 55th season of the Nationale 1 (NM1), the top-tier basketball league in Senegal.

DUC were the defending champions, having won the 2021 season. The champions of this season qualified directly for the 2023 BAL season.

AS Douanes won its 10th national title, after defeating DUC in the finals. It was the fourth season in a row that the two teams met in the finals.

== Teams ==
ISEG Sports left the league, while US Parcelles Assainie (USPA) joined the league.

Team	Location
AS Douanes	Dakar
ASC Thiès	Thiès
Bopp	Dakar
ASFA	Dakar
DUC Dakar	Dakar
Jeanne d'Arc	Dakar
Louga	Louga
Mermoz	Dakar
SLBC	Saint-Louis
Sibac	Dakar (Sicap-Liberté)
UGB	Saint-Louis
US Rail	Thiès
USO	Dakar (Ouakam)
USPA	Dakar (Parcelles Assainies Arrondissement)
ASC Ville de Dakar	Dakar

== Regular season ==
Standings at the ending of the regular season.

=== Poule A ===
Pos	2022 Nationale 1 Poule A							
Pos	Team	Pld	W	L	Pnt	PF	PA	PD
1	DUC	14	14	0	28	1075	841	+234
2	Jeanne d'Arc	14	9	5	23	1004	865	+139
3	ASC Ville de Dakar	14	9	5	23	965	924	+41
4	US Rail	14	7	7	21	924	885	+39
5	Louga	14	7	7	21	817	901	–84
6	ASCC Bopp	14	4	10	18	874	934	–60
7	USCT Port	14	3	11	17	862	1038	–176
8	ASC Thiès	14	3	11	17	838	971	–133

=== Poule B ===
Pos	2022 Nationale 1 Poule B							
Pos	Team	Pld	W	L	Pnt	PF	PA	PD
1	AS Douanes	13^{1}	12	1	25	967	675	+292
2	US Ouakam	14	10	4	24	867	818	+49
3	UGB	14	9	5	23	828	815	+13
4	SIBAC	14	8	6	22	829	826	+3
5	ASFA	14	5	9	19	808	912	–104
6	Mermoz	14	5	9	19	802	848	–46
7	SLBC	13^{1}	4	9	17	673	758	–85
8	USPA	14	2	12	16	890	1012	–122

- ^{1} AS Douanes and SLBC played one game less.

== Playoffs ==
The playoffs began on 16 July and ended 15 October 2022.

Quarter-finals (Best-of-three)
AS Douanes	87	68
US Rail	51	63
Jeanne d'Arc	66	47
UGB	60	46
ASC Ville de Dakar	56	77	56
US Ouakam	51	83	65
DUC	73	70
SIBAC	47	64

Semi-finals (Best-of-three)
AS Douanes	76	72
Jeanne d'Arc	59	62
US Ouakam	79	66	72
DUC	65	81	78

Finals (Best-of-three)
AS Douanes	71	73
DUC	66	70

=== Finals ===
5 October 2022

Report

DUC	66–71	AS Douanes
Scoring by quarter: 18–21, 10–13, 13–21, 25–16
Pts: Diakhite 19		Pts: Kamara 18

Stade Marius Ndiaye, Dakar

15 October 2022

Report

AS Douanes	73–70	DUC
AS Douanes win series 2–0

Stade Marius Ndiaye, Dakar

== Play-down ==
The play-down is played in a round-robin format.

Pos	Team	Pld	W	L	GF	GA	GD	Pts	Qualification
1	Louga	22	11	11	1358	1437	−79	33	
2	Bopp	22	10	12	1435	1478	−43	32	
3	Mermoz	22	9	13	1344	1391	−47	31	
4	UCST PAD	22	9	13	1448	1573	−125	31	
5	ASFA	22	8	14	1386	1520	−134	30	
6	ASC Thiès	22	7	15	1344	1446	−102	29	
7	USPA (R)	22	5	17	1444	1609	−165	27	Relegated to Nationale 2
8	SLBC (R)	22	6	16	1081	1204	−123	28	Relegated to Nationale 2

Source: Senegalese Basketball Federation
(R) Relegated
