= Senegalese Mayor Cup =

The Senegalese Women's Mayor Cup (in French: Coupe du Maire) is the a men's and women's basketball tournament for teams in Dakar.

It is one of the three basketball cups for Senegalese teams, besides the Senegalese Basketball Cup and the Saint Michel Cup.

== Men's competition ==
=== Champions ===
Year	Champions	Runners-up	Score	MVP	Ref.
2022	DUC	ASC Ville de Dakar	76–61		

== Women's competition ==
=== Champions ===
Year	Champions	Runners-up	Score	MVP	Ref.
2021	ASC Ville de Dakar (3)	DUC Dakar	64–57	Adama Coulibaly	
2022	ASC Ville de Dakar (4)	JA	69–65		

=== Performances by club ===
Club	Titles	Years won
Ville de Dakar	4	2017, 2018, 2021, 2022
