= Trophée des Champions (basketball, Senegal) =

- Country: Senegal
- Confederation: FIBA Africa
- Current champions: Men's: DUC (1st title); Women's: ASC Ville de Dakar (1st title) (2024)

The Trophée des Champions is an annual basketball game in Senegal for men's and women's teams. The men's game consists out of one game which is played in the beginning of the season, between the champions of the Nationale Macsulin 1 (NM1) and the winners of the Saint Michel Cup. It is equivalent to super cup games in other countries.

== Men's finals ==
Year	Winner	Runner-up	Score	Ref(s)
2015	Saint Louis	AS Douanes	65–59	
2019	AS Douanes	Saint Louis	61–59	
2024	DUC	AS Douanes	20–0 (Note: AS Douanes forfeited the game.)	

== Women's finals ==
Year	Winner	Runner-up	Score	Ref(s)
2024	ASC Ville de Dakar	DUC	62–40	

== See also ==
- Nationale 1 (Senegal)
- Senegalese Basketball Cup
- Saint Michel Cup
