= Thierno Niang =

Senegalese basketball player

No. 5 – ASC Ville de Dakar
- Position: Guard
- League: NM1; Basketball Africa League

Personal information
- Born: March 8, 1990 (age 36) Dakar, Senegal
- Listed height: 6 ft 1 in (1.85 m)
- Listed weight: 205 lb (93 kg)

Career information
- High school: Bridgton Academy (North Bridgton, Maine)
- College: Triton (2010–2012); Milwaukee (2012–2014)
- NBA draft: 2014: undrafted
- Playing career: 2014–present

Career history
- 2014–2016: Al Geish Army
- 2016–2017: Gipuzkoa
- 2018–2019: DUC Dakar
- 2019–2021: AS Douanes
- 2021–2022: DUC Dakar
- 2023–2025: Jeanne d'Arc
- 2025–present: ASC Ville de Dakar

Career highlights
- NM1 champion (2021); NM1 Finals MVP (2021); NM1 Most Valuable Player (2021); Senegalese Cup winner (2022); Dakar Municipal Cup winner (2022); LEB Oro champion (2017)
Medals
Men's basketball
Representing Senegal
AfroBasket
Bronze medal – third place	2017 Tunisia/Senegal

Thierno Ibrahima Niang (born March 8, 1990) is a Senegalese basketball player who plays for ASC Ville de Dakar of the NM1. He played college basketball with the Milwaukee Panthers men's basketball team, although a nagging back injury reduced his role from impact starter to reserve. Niang also competes at international events with the Senegal national team. He played the sport in high school at Bridgton Academy and went on to represent Triton College in Illinois.

== Early life ==
Niang was born in the town of Medina Gounass in Dakar, Senegal to Cheiilh Niang and Ndgye Penda Tall. He moved to the United States three years before reaching high school.

== College career ==
After completing his years in Bridgton Academy in Maine, Niang represented the Triton College as the team's basketball star. He averaged 6.0 points, 3.8 rebounds, 3.6 assists, and 1.9 steals per game in his freshman season. Niang finished recording 7.7 points, 3.4 rebounds, 4.7 assists, and 1.3 steals on average per game as a sophomore. The team finished with a 27-5 mark in his final season with the Trojans.

Niang orally committed to join the Milwaukee Panthers basketball team and attend University of Wisconsin–Milwaukee on May 10, 2012. He was not rated by Rivals.com or any other major sports recruiting website. Niang joined with two years of eligibility remaining with Donald Thomas and Jordan Aaron.

He made his collegiate debut on November 8, 2013 against University of Mary, with 11 points, 2 rebounds, and 2 assists as the starting guard. This would be Niang's season-high scoring total and one of six starts as a freshman. He suffered a stress fracture in his lower back as the season continued and ultimately ended up a spectator. Niang said, "It happened a little bit earlier and I was able to play with it. But one day it got really bad, and that's when I couldn't even move. When it first happened it was scary, because it was my first back injury. I really thought maybe I wouldn't ever be able to play basketball again. That was the first thing that was kind of in my mind" after the team's annual Tipoff Luncheon at the UW–Milwaukee Panther Arena. He finished the year averaging 3.6 points, 2.6 rebounds, and 1.1 assists in 14 appearances. His most notable display took place against Davidson, when he grabbed 12 total rebounds.

At the conclusion of his sophomore season, Niang averaged 2.4 points, 1.8 rebounds, and 0.8 assists. He scored a season-high 10 points against Loyola Chicago, his only double-digit scoring performance.

== Professional career ==
On December 15, 2014, Niang was signed by Al Geish Army of the Egyptian Basketball Premier League.

On 24 August 2016, Niang agreed terms with Spanish second league team RETAbet.es GBC.

In 2018, he played with DUC Dakar in Senegal. In 2019 and 2020, he played for AS Douanes before returning to DUC. On August 9, 2021, Niang and DUC Dakar won its fifth national championship after defeating AS Douanes in the final. Niang was named also named the league's Finals MVP.

After the 2022 season, in which Niang won the Senegalese Cup with DUC, he signed with league rivals Jeanne d'Arc.

== International career ==
Niang made his first FIBA event appearance with Senegal at the 2011 FIBA Africa Championship. He averaged 3.8 points, 2.6 rebounds, and 1.8 assists, helping the team finish in 5th place.

Niang's name was named to the roster for the 2014 FIBA Basketball World Cup by head coach Cheikh Sarr shortly before the commencement of the tournament. He made his first-ever appearance playing at the level on August 30, 2014 against Greece with one rebound and 0-of-1 shooting off the bench.

== BAL career statistics ==
Legend
GP	Games played	GS	Games started	MPG	Minutes per game
FG%	Field goal percentage	3P%	3-point field goal percentage	FT%	Free throw percentage
RPG	Rebounds per game	APG	Assists per game	SPG	Steals per game
BPG	Blocks per game	PPG	Points per game	**Bold**	Career high

Year	Team	GP	GS	MPG	FG%	3P%	FT%	RPG	APG	SPG	BPG	PPG
2022	DUC	5	2	15.0	.188	.000	1.000	1.4	1.8	0.6	0.0	1.8
Career		5	2	15.0	.188	.000	1.000	1.4	1.8	0.6	0.0	1.8

== Awards and accomplishments ==
=== Club ===
DUC

- Nationale 1 Champion: (2021)

Gizupkoa

- LEB Oro Champion: (2017)

DUC

- Senegalese Cup winner: (2022)
- Dakar Municipal Cup winner: (2022)

=== Individual ===
- Nationale 1 Finals MVP: (2021)
