= Pabi Guèye =

Senegalese basketball coach

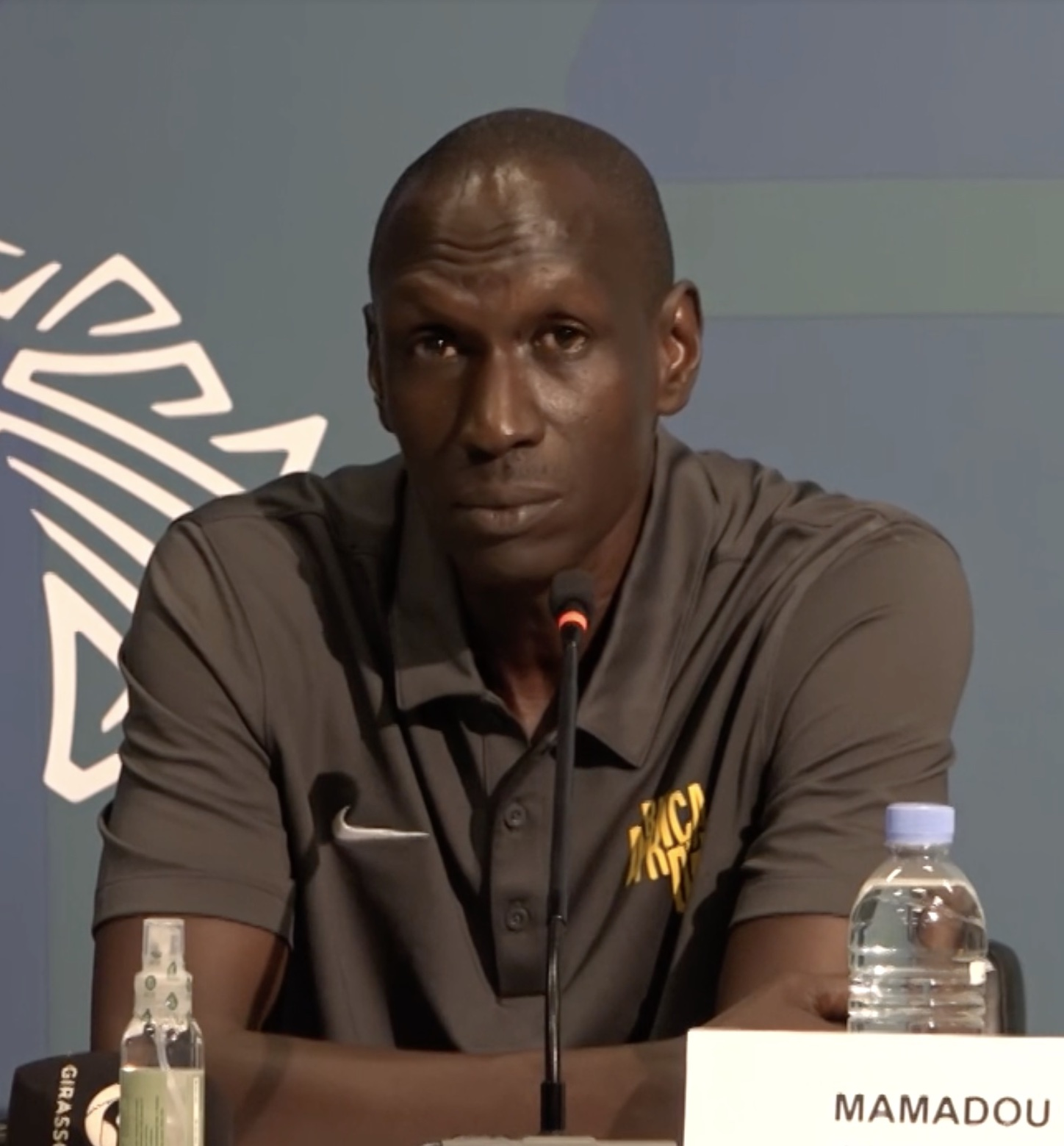
- Gueye in 2023

Dar City
- Position: Head coach
- League: Road to BAL

Personal information
- Born: 29 September 1978 (age 48) Guinguinéo, Kaolack Region, Senegal

Career information
- Playing career: 1992–2012
- Coaching career: 2012–present

Career history

Playing
- 1992–1995: US Rail
- 1996–1998: AS Douanes
- 1999–2003: Ndiambour BC
- 2004–2005: US Rail
- 2005–2008: Ittihad Tanger
- 2008–2012: AS Douanes

Coaching
- 2012: Senegal national team U18 (assistant)
- 2013–present: AS Douanes
- 2017–2024: Senegal national team (assistant)
- 2024–2025: Urunani
- 2025–present: Dar City

Career highlights
- As player: 4× NM1 champion (1998, 2005, 2008, 2011); 2× Senegalese Cup winner (2011, 2012); Division Excellence champion (2008); Moroccan Cup winner (2006); As head coach: BAL Coach of the Year (2023); 7× NM1 champion (2014, 2016, 2017, 2018, 2019, 2022, 2023); 6× NM1 Coach of the Year (2016, 2017, 2018, 2019, 2022, 2023); 6× Senegalese Cup winner (2013, 2014, 2017, 2019, 2021, 2024); 2× Saint Michel Cup winner (2018, 2023)

Mamadou "Pabi" Guèye (born 29 September 1978) is a Senegalese professional basketball coach and former player who is the current head coach of Urunani and as an assistant for Senegal men's national team.

He had a 20-year long playing career, of which the majority was in Senegal as well as three seasons in Morocco for Ittihad Tanger.

After playing six seasons for AS Douanes, Gueye became the club's head coach in 2013. He guided them to six NM1 championships. Gueye led the Douanes to the final of the 2023 BAL season, and was named Coach of the Year.

== Early life ==
Born in Guinguinéo, his father was a railway worker. Guèye picked up basketball at Ballabey in Thiès and left school in third grade in 1995.

== Coaching career ==
Since 2013, Guèye has been the head coach of AS Douanes, and he has won a record seven Nationale 1 championships for the team. He has also been a 6-time winner of the league's Coach of the Year award. Guèye guided the Douanes in the 2021 season of the Basketball Africa League (BAL), where the team reached the quarter-finals.

Gueye and AS Douanes returned to the BAL in the 2023. He guided the team to the second place in the Sahara Conference, and helped the team win the quarter- and semi-finals. On 26 May, Guèye was named the BAL Coach of the Year. In the final, AS Douanes lost to Al Ahly.

In October 2024, Guèye took over as head coach of Burundian champions Urunani, to coach them in the Road to BAL.

In October 2025, he signed as head coach of Tanzanian national champions Dar City, to lead them in the 2026 BAL qualification.

=== Senegal national team ===
From 2017, Guèye was an assistant coach for the Senegal national team.

On 30 January 2021 Guèye was appointed as head coach of the Senegalese men's national team ahead of the AfroBasket 2021 qualification for his first international experience as head coach. He helped Senegal clinch their ticket for the 2021 tournament.

== Personal ==
Guèye is married and has two sons.

== Head coaching record ==
=== BAL ===
Legend
Regular season	G	Games coached	W	Games won	L	Games lost	W–L %	Win–loss %
Playoffs	PG	Playoff games	PW	Playoff wins	PL	Playoff losses	PW–L %	Playoff win–loss %

Team	Year	G	W	L	W–L%	Finish	PG	PW	PL	PW–L%	Result
AS Douanes	2021	3	1	2	.333	3rd in Group C	1	0	1	.000	Lost in Quarter-finals
AS Douanes	2023	5	3	2	.600	2nd in Sahara Conference	3	2	1	.667	Lost in Final
AS Douanes	2024	6	3	3	.600	2nd in Sahara Conference	2	1	1	.500	Lost in Quarter-finals
Career		14	7	7	.500	–	6	3	3	.500	0 championships
