= USCT Port =

Senegalese basketball team

- League: Nationale 1
- Founded: 1962
- President: Becaye Ba
- Head coach: El Hadji Diop
- Ownership: Autonomous Port of Dakar
- Championships: 1 Senegalese Second Division
Home

USCT Port, also known as USCT PAD, is a Senegalese basketball team based in Dakar. It currently plays in the Nationale 1, after being promoted from second division in 2021. It is the basketball team of the Autonomous Port of Dakar.

== Honours ==
Nationale 2

- Champions (1): 2021

== Season by season ==
Season	League	Group	Regular season				Playoffs
Season	League	Group	Finish	Wins	Losses	Pct.	Playoffs
USCT Port
2020		Cancelled due to the COVID-19 pandemic					
2021	Nationale 2	Promoted as champions					
2022	Nationale 1	Group A	7th	3	11	.214	4th in Play-down (6–2)
2023	Nationale 1	Group A	5th	6	8	.429	4th in Play-down (6–2)
2024	Nationale 1	Group A	7th	3	11	.214	Will play in play-down
Regular season record				12	30	.286	
Play-down record				12	4	.750	
