= Mermoz BC =

Mermoz
- League: Nationale 1
- Arena: Stadium Marius Ndiaye
- Location: Dakar, Senegal
- Team colors: Navy, Orange and White
- President: Sadio Diallo
- Team captain: Oumar Lo
- Championships: 1 Saint Michel Cup

Mermoz Basket Club, also known as simply Mermoz or MBC, is a Senegalese basketball club based in Dakar. Their men's team plays in the Nationale 1, the top level of national basketball. They won the Saint Michel Cup once, in 2011, after defeating US Gorée in the final.

== Honours ==
Saint Michel Cup

- Winners (1): 2011
- Runners-up (2): 2012, 2016

== Season by season ==
Season	Group	Regular season				Playoffs or Play-down
Season	Group	Finish	Wins	Losses	Pct.	Playoffs or Play-down
Mermoz
2019	–	11th	6	8	.429	–
2020	Cancelled due to the COVID-19 pandemic					
2021	Group A	8th	3	11	.214	Unknown
2022	Group B	6th	5	9	.357	4th in Play-down (4–4)
2023	Group A	5th	6	7	.462	2nd in Play-down (3–6)
2024	Group B	3rd	7	7	.500	4th in Group B of the Final Eight (1–5)
Regular season record			27	36	.429	
Playoff record			1	5	.167	
Play-down record			7	10	.412	
