= 2021 Nationale 1 season =

2021 Nationale 1
- Season: 2021
- Teams: 16

Regular season
- BAL: DUC Dakar
- Season MVP: Thierno Niang (DUC)
- Relegated: Mermoz; ASC Thiès

Finals
- Champions: DUC Dakar (5th title)
- Runners-up: AS Douanes
- Finals MVP: Thierno Niang (DUC)

The 2021 Nationale 1 season was the season of the Nationale 1, the premier basketball league in Senegal. The champions directly qualify for the 2022 Basketball Africa League season.

DUC Dakar won its fifth national championship after defeating defending champions AS Douanes in the final. Thierno Niang was named the league's Finals MVP.

== Teams ==
Tamba and HLM were relegated after finishing in the last two places in the 2019 Nationale 1 season. Bopp and ISEG Sports were promoted.

Team	Location
AS Douanes	Dakar
ASC Thiès	Thiès
Bopp	Dakar
ASFA	Dakar
DUC Dakar	Dakar
JA	Dakar
ISEG Sports	Dakar
Louga	Louga
Mermoz	Dakar
SLBC	Saint-Louis
Saltigué	Rufisque
Sibac	Dakar (Sicap-Liberté)
UGB	Saint-Louis
US Rail	Thiès
USO	Dakar (Ouakam)
ASC Ville de Dakar	Dakar

== Regular season ==
=== Group A ===
Pos	Team	Pld	W	L	Qualification or relegation
1	AS Douanes	14	12	2	Advance to championship playoffs
2	JA	14	9	5	Advance to championship playoffs
3	Louga	14	9	5	Advance to championship playoffs
4	USO	14	9	5	Advance to championship playoffs
5	Sibac	14	8	6	
6	ASFA	14	3	11	
7	ISEG Sports (R)	14	3	11	Relegation to Nationale 2
8	Mermoz	14	3	11	

Source: Afrobasket
(R) Relegated

=== Group B ===
Pos	Team	Pld	W	L	Qualification or relegation
1	DUC Dakar	14	12	2	Advance to championship playoffs
2	Ville de Dakar	14	11	3	Advance to championship playoffs
3	SLBC	14	9	5	Advance to championship playoffs
4	UGB	14	7	7	Advance to championship playoffs
5	Saltigue	14	6	8	
6	US Rail	14	6	8	
7	Bopp	14	4	10	
8	ASC Thiès	14	1	13	Relegation to Nationale 2

Source: Afrobasket

== Championship playoffs ==
Quarter-finals
AS Douanes	2
UGB	0
Ville de Dakar	2
USO	0
DUC Dakar	2
Louga	0
JA	2
SLBC	1

Semi-finals
AS Douanes	2
Ville de Dakar	1
DUC Dakar	2
JA	1

Final
8 August
AS Douanes	65
DUC Dakar	66

=== Semifinals ===
AS Douanes vs ASC Ville de Dakar

AS Douanes	94–49	ASC Ville de Dakar

ASC Ville de Dakar	56–67	AS Douanes

DUC Dakar vs SLBC

DUC Dakar	79–68	SLBC

SLBC	71–66	DUC Dakar

DUC Dakar	78–73	SLBC

=== Final ===
8 August 2021

Report

AS Douanes	65–66	DUC Dakar
