= Mamadou N'Doye =

Senegalese basketball player

Personal information
- Born: October 6, 1979 (age 47) Rufisque, Senegal
- Listed height: 6 ft 3 in (1.91 m)
- Position: Point guard

Career history
- 2012–2015: UGB

Career highlights
- NM1 champion (2012); NM1 MVP (2013)

Mamadou N'Doye (born October 6, 1979) is a Senegalese former basketball player. He played for the Senegalese national team, where he participated at the 2014 FIBA Basketball World Cup.

N'Doye played in the Senegalese Nationale 1 for UGB and won the league's MVP award in 2013.
