= BAL Most Valuable Player =

Basketball award

BAL Most Valuable Player Award
- Sport: Basketball
- League: Basketball Africa League
- Awarded for: Best performing player in the season of the Basketball Africa League

History
- First award: 2021
- Most wins: 5 players (1 each)
- Most recent: Jean Jacques Boissy (2025)

The Basketball Africa League Hakeem Olajuwon Most Valuable Player Award (MVP) is an annual Basketball Africa League (BAL) award given to the best player of a given season. The award is named after all-time great Hakeem Olajuwon. The award was first handed out in the inaugural season to Walter Hodge.

From the 2024 season, fan voting was introduced in the process with 25% of the score being determined by online fan votes. Fans could vote on a selected pool of players.

Five different players have won the award thus far.

== Winners ==
Key
Player (X)	Name of the player and number of times they had won the award at that point (if more than one)
†	Player was on a team that did not win the BAL championship

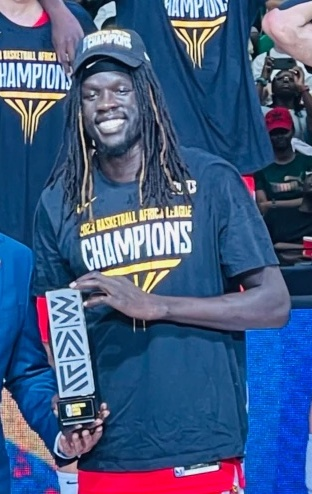
Nuni Omot with the MVP award in 2023. He was the first African player to win the award.

Season	Player	Position	Nationality	Club	Selected statistics	Ref
2021	Walter Hodge	Guard	US Virgin Islands (Note: Hodge, born in Puerto Rico, also owns the Puerto Rican and American nationality but represents the US Virgin Islands in international competition.)	(Egypt) Zamalek	15.2 points, 4.4 rebounds and 5.8 assists per game; 19 points and 10 assists in semi-final; 12 points and 4 assists in the final	
2022	Michael Dixon	Guard	Georgia (Note: Dixon was born in the United States but became a naturalised Georgian citizen in 2016.)	(Tunisia) US Monastir	15.2 points, 4.4 rebounds and 5.8 assists per game; Led the league in three-point percentage with 47.4%; 21 points and 6 assists in the final	
2023	Nuni Omot	Forward	South Sudan (Note: Omot was born to South Sudanese parents in a refugee camp in Nairobi, Kenya. He also owns the American nationality as he moved to the country at age 2. He represents South Sudan in international competition.)	(Egypt) Al Ahly	18.9 points per game; Four 20+ points games; 22 points in the final	
2024	Jo Lual-Acuil	Center	South Sudan	(Libya) Al Ahly Ly^{†}	Scoring champion with 21.1 points per game; Defensive Player of the Year winner; Broke BAL scoring record with 42 points against City Oilers	
2025	Jean Jacques Boissy	Guard	Senegal	(Libya) Al Ahli Tripoli	Scoring champion with 18.9 points per game; Five 20+ points games; All-Defensive First Team selection	
2026	Craig Randall II	Guard	United States	(Rwanda) RSSB Tigers	Scoring champion with 36 points per game (all-time high); Set new BAL scoring record with 54 points	
