= Bamba Diallo =

Senegalese basketball player

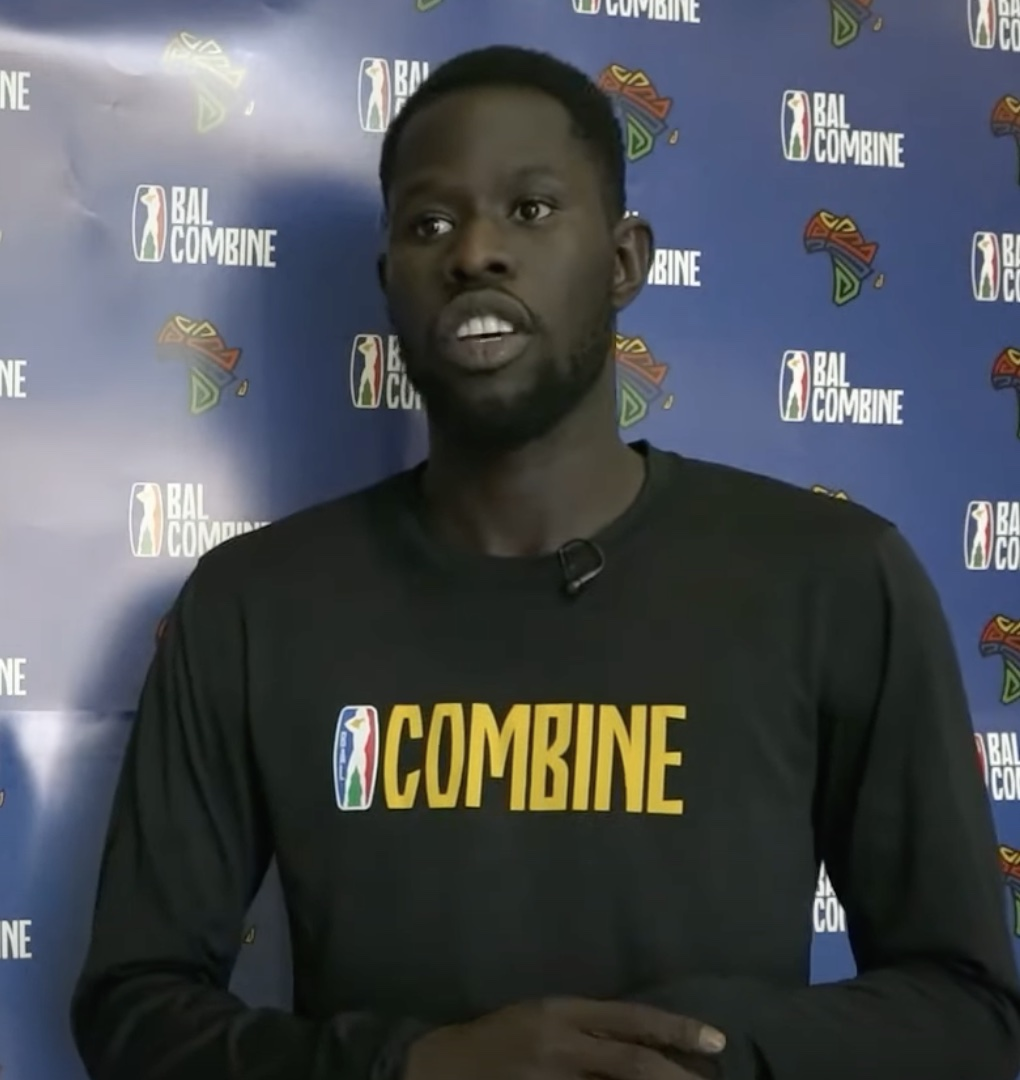
- Diallo in 2023

CRB Tombouctou
- Position: Shooting guard
- League: LNB Pro B

Personal information
- Born: 15 March 1996 (age 30) Thiès, Senegal
- Listed height: 1.91 m (6 ft 3 in)
- Listed weight: 77 kg (170 lb)

Career information
- High school: Cape Fear Christian Academy (North Carolina)
- College: Kilgore (2015–2017); American (2017–2019)
- Playing career: 2021–present

Career history
- 2021: AS Douanes
- 2021–2022: DUC Dakar
- 2023: Jeanne d'Arc
- 2023–2024: AS Loon Plage Basket
- 2025–present: CRB Tombouctou

Career highlights
- 2× Senegalese Cup winner (2021, 2022); Senegalese Cup MVP (2021); Dakar Municipal Cup winner (2022)

Cheikh Bamba "C.B." Diallo (born 28 March 1990) is a Senegalese basketball player for AS Loon plage Basket and the Senegal national team. Standing at 1.91 m (6 ft 3 in), he mainly plays as shooting guard.

== Early career ==
Born in Thiès, Diallo played with the SEED Academy from age 16. In 2013, he played at a Basketball Without Borders camp in South Africa and was named the All-Star Game MVP. He moved to the United States to play high school basketball in North Carolina with Cape Fear Christian Academy.

== College career ==
Diallo played two seasons with Kilgore College from 2015 until 2017. He averaged 24 minutes, 9.6 points and 2.2 rebounds in 59 games with Kilgore. In 2017, he transferred to the American Eagles men's basketball team.

== Professional career ==
In May 2021, Diallo signed with Senegalese side AS Douanes. He was on the roster for the first-ever season of the Basketball Africa League (BAL). Diallo helped the Douanes win the Senegalese Cup in October, and was named the MVP after scoring 22 points in the final against Jeanne d'Arc.

In November 2021, Diallo signed with DUC Dakar of the Nationale 1 and for the 2022 BAL season. On 16 March 2022, Diallo scored a BAL career-high 30 points in a loss to AS Salé.

After the 2022 season, in which DUC won the Senegalese Cup, Diallo signed with rivals Jeanne d'Arc.

In July 2023, Diallo signed with French club AS Loon Plage Basket, who were promoted to the LNB Pro B as the champions of the French third division Nationale Masculine 1.

== National team career ==
In 2021, Diallo was called up for the Senegalese national basketball team and made his debut against Kenya in February. He also played at FIBA AfroBasket 2021, contributing 5.3 points per game for Senegal on its way to a bronze medal.

== BAL career statistics ==
Legend
GP	Games played	GS	Games started	MPG	Minutes per game
FG%	Field goal percentage	3P%	3-point field goal percentage	FT%	Free throw percentage
RPG	Rebounds per game	APG	Assists per game	SPG	Steals per game
BPG	Blocks per game	PPG	Points per game	**Bold**	Career high

Year	Team	GP	GS	MPG	FG%	3P%	FT%	RPG	APG	SPG	BPG	PPG
2021	AS Douanes	4	0	20.7	.410	**.435**	.833	**3.0**	1.0	**1.8**	0.0	11.8
2022	DUC	**5**	**5**	**30.6**	**.448**	.375	**.900**	1.8	1.0	0.8	**0.2**	**15.2**
Career		9	5	26.2	.431	.402	.870	2.3	1.0	1.2	0.1	13.7

== Awards and accomplishments ==
=== Club career ===
AS Douanes

- Senegalese Cup winner: (2021)

DUC Dakar

- Senegalese Cup winner: (2022)
- Dakar Municipal Cup winner: (2022)

=== National team career ===
Senegal

- AfroBasket (bronze) Bronze Medal: (2021)

=== Individual awards ===
- Senegalese Cup MVP: (2021)
