= 2019 Nationale 1 season =

2019 Nationale 1
- Season: 2019
- Teams: 16

Regular season
- BAL: AS Douanes
- Relegated: Tamba; HBC

Finals
- Champions: AS Douanes; 9th title
- Runners-up: DUC Dakar
- Semifinalists: USO; Saint-Louis

The 2019 Natinonale 1 season was the season of the Nationale 1, the premier basketball league in Senegal.

AS Douanes won its ninth national title on 21 October 2019, beating DUC Dakar in the final. AS Douanes qualified for the 2020 BAL season.

== Teams ==
Team	Location
AS Douanes	Dakar
ASC Thiès	Thiès
ASCVD	Dakar
ASFA	Dakar
DUC Dakar	Dakar
HLM	
JA	Dakar
Louga	Louga
Mermoz	
SLBC	Saint-Louis
Saltigue	Rufisque
Sibac	Dakar
Tamba	Tamba
UGB	Saint-Louis
US Rail	Thiès
USO	Dakar (Ouakam)

== Regular season ==
Pos	Team	Pld	W	L	Qualification or relegation
1	AS Douanes (O, C)	16	14	2	Advance to championship playoffs
2	USO	16	13	3	Advance to championship playoffs
3	DUC Dakar	16	12	4	Advance to championship playoffs
4	SLBC	16	12	4	Advance to championship playoffs
5	ASFA	16	11	5	
6	ASCVD	16	8	8	
7	Louga	16	8	8	
8	Saltigué	16	6	10	
9	JA	14	8	6	
10	Sibac	14	6	8	
11	Mermoz	14	6	8	
12	UGB	14	5	9	
13	US Rail	14	5	9	
14	ASC Thiès	13	3	10	
15	Tamba (R)	14	2	12	Relegation to Nationale 2
16	HLM BC (R)	14	1	13	Relegation to Nationale 2

Source: Afrobasket
(C) Champions; (O) Play-off winners; (R) Relegated

== Championship playoffs ==
Semifinals
1	AS Douanes	2
4	SLBC	1
2	USO	1
3	DUC Dakar	2

Final
1	AS Douanes	61
3	DUC Dakar	54
