= Jean Jacques Boissy =

Senegalese basketball player (born 2000)

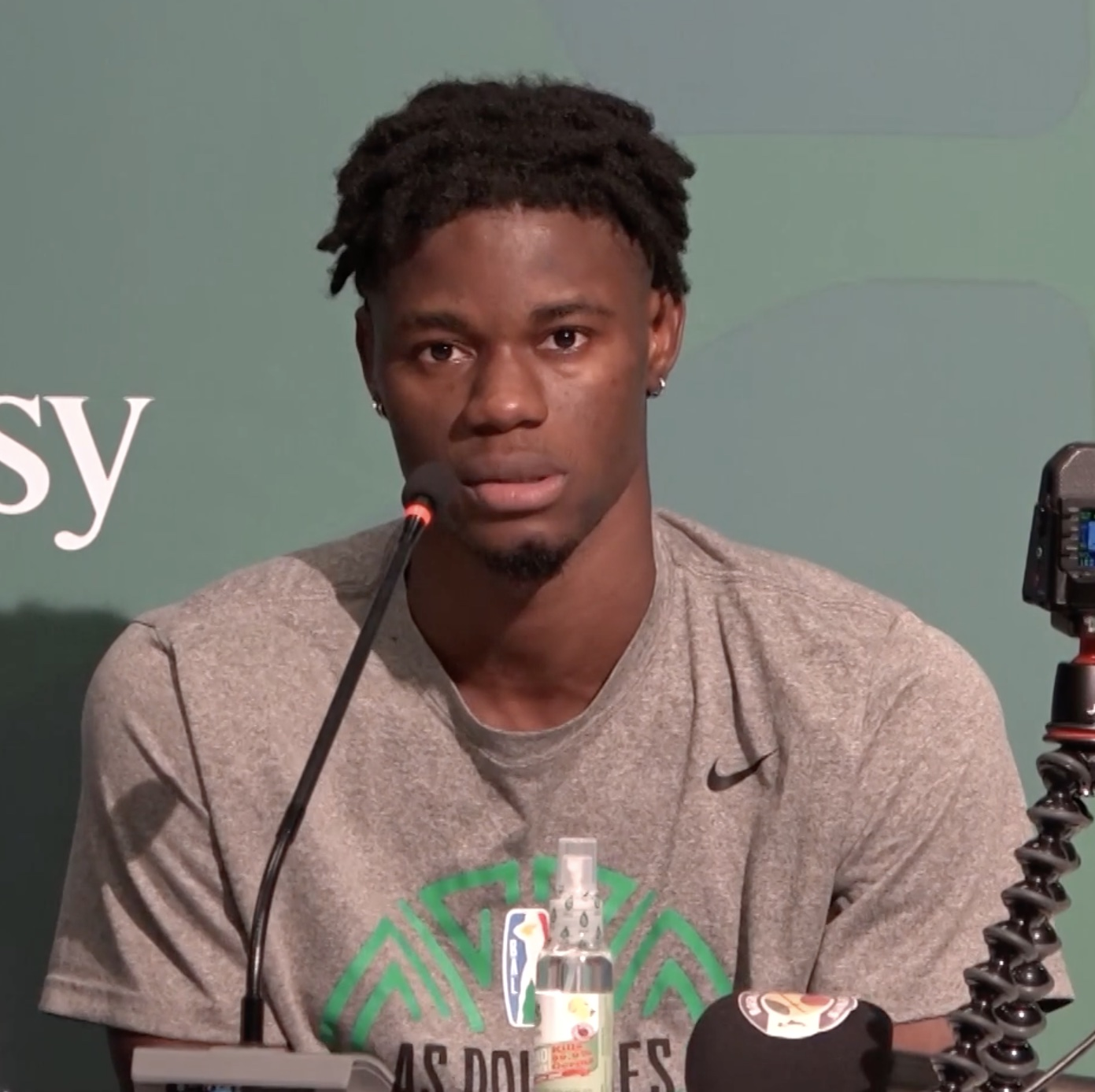
- Boissy in 2023

Dar City
- Position: Point guard
- League: Road to BAL

Personal information
- Born: 28 January 2000 (age 26) Dakar, Senegal
- Listed height: 1.88 m (6 ft 2 in)
- Listed weight: 84 kg (185 lb)

Career information
- High school: NBA Academy Africa (Saly, Senegal)
- NBA draft: 2022: undrafted
- Playing career: 2019–present

Career history
- 2019–2020: United Generation Basketball
- 2020–2021: SIBAC
- 2021–2022: Cornellà
- 2023: AS Douanes
- 2023: Aurore Vitré
- 2024: AS Douanes
- 2024: Urunani
- 2025: REG
- 2025: Al Ahli Tripoli
- 2025–2026: Windy City Bulls
- 2026: Al Ahly Ly
- 2026–present: Dar City

Career highlights
- BAL champion (2025); BAL Most Valuable Player (2025); BAL scoring champion (2025); All-BAL First Team (2023); 2× BAL All-Defensive First Team (2023, 2025); BAL All-Defensive Second Team (2024); VBL champion (2024); VBL Finals MVP (2024); Saint Michel Cup winner (2023); Saint Michel Cup Final MVP (2023); Single-game records: Most points in an AfroBasket game (40)
Medals
Men's basketball
Representing Senegal
AfroBasket
Bronze medal – third place	2025 Angola

Jean Jacques Boissy (born 28 January 2000) is a Senegalese professional basketball player. Playing at point guard, he is a graduate of the NBA Academy Africa and has played professionally since 2021. Boissy won the BAL championship in 2025, and was the MVP in the same year. He is also a two-time All-BAL First Team selection. Internationally, Boissy plays for the Senegal national team since 2022, and led the team to a bronze medal at AfroBasket 2025.

== Early life and career ==
Basketball was introduced to Boissy by his father, Elysee Boissy, who was a former Senegal national team player and played at the 2023 FIBA Africa Championship. At age 15, he switched from football to basketball. Boissy later joined the NBA Academy Africa where he combined his high school education with basketball. After graduating, he aimed to play collegiate in the United States but did not receive an offer.

He then enrolled to African Leadership University at their campus in Rwanda in 2019, and played pre-season games for Patriots BBC in the Rwanda Basketball League. After this, Boissy signed for United Generation Basketball Club (UGB) of the Rwandan League.

== Professional career ==
=== SIBAC (2020–2021) ===
Boissy made his first minutes in the Senegalese top division Nationale 1 for SIBAC in the 2020–21 season.

=== Cornellà (2021–2022) ===
Boissy started the 2021–22 season in Spain for CB Cornellà of the third level LEB Plata, making his debut in October 2021. Coming off the bench as back-up point guard, he averaged 5.1 points in 10.5 minutes of play for Cornellà.

=== AS Douanes (2023) ===
Boissy then signed for AS Douanes in 2023, where Boissy was the MVP in the final of the 2023 Saint Michel Cup, which Douanes won over ASCVD after he scored 28 points. Boissy played with Douanes in the 2023 BAL season, where he a crucial role in the final game day win over defending champions Monastir, as he had 15 points and 11 rebounds and 7 assists. He continued his impressive play in the playoffs. In the semi-final against Petro de Luanda on 25 May, Boissy scored 28 points to surprisingly lead Douanes to their first-ever BAL final. In the final, Boissy scored 20 points but Douanes fell short of the title as they lost to Al Ahly. He was named to the All-BAL First Team after the game, as well as to the All-Defensive Team.

=== Aurore Vitré (2023) ===
In June 2023, he signs for the French team Aurore Vitré Basket, which plays in the third division Nationale Masculine 1. On 3 December, Aurore Vitré announced that Boissy's contract was terminated with mutual consent.

=== Return to AS Douanes (2024) ===
On February 28, 2024, AS Douanes announced the signing of Boissy who would return for a second stint. Boissy was named to the BAL All-Defensive Second Team, and averaged 10.9 points, 5.0 rebounds and 4.9 assists for the season as the Douanes were eliminated in the quarterfinals by eventual champions Petro de Luanda.

=== Urunani (2024) ===
In July 2024, Boissy joined Burundian club Urunani of the Viva Basketball League (VBL). He made his debut with 13 points in a 52–46 win over Remesha. On 29 September, he won the VBL championship after Urunani defeated Dynamo in seven games in the finals series. Boissy scored 30 points in the deciding Game 7 and received the league's Finals MVP award after the game.

=== REG (2025) ===
In January 2025, Boissy signed with REG BBC of the Rwanda Basketball League (RBL), returning to the league for the first time in four years. On March 22, 2025, he scored 32 points, along with 7 rebounds and 6 assists, to beat rivals Patriots in the RBL regular season. On April 30, 2025, Boissy scored a season-high 37 points in a win over Orion.

=== Al Ahli Tripoli (2025) ===
Boissy joined Al Ahli Tripoli for the 2025 BAL season. On May 18, 2025, Boissy made his debut for Al Ahli, scoring 28 points in the season opener against MBB, leading his team to a 87–77. He led Al Ahli to its first championship, becoming the first Libyan team to do so, after defeating Petro de Luanda in the final. He became the first Senegalese player to win the BAL title. Additionally, Boissy was named the BAL Most Valuable Player after the game. Boissy also received the Best Scorer award after averaging 18.9 points per game, and was selected to the All-Defensive First Team for a second time in his career.

In September 2025, he played with Libyan club Al Ahli Tripoli at the 2025 FIBA Intercontinental Cup, where the team won a bronze medal, becoming the first African team in history to finish on the podium.

=== NBA G League (2025–2026) ===
On 8 July 2025, Boissy was selected in the NBA G League International Draft with the fifth overall pick by the Memphis Hustle. Following his selection, his draft rights were traded to the Windy City Bulls. He made his G League debut on November 11th, 2025 in a game against the Wisconsin Herd. He then had his G League career high in scoring, managing 12 points on November 21st, against the Iowa Wolves. After 9 game appearances, on January 5th, 2026 the Windy City Bulls placed him on waivers.

Boissy then played in the 2026 BAL season with Al Ahly Ly, leading the team to a third place while averaging 12.2 points, 3.4 rebounds and 3 assists per game. In October 2026, Boissy joined Dar City for the 2026 Road to BAL.

== National team career ==
Boissy played for Senegal at the junior level at the 2018 FIBA U18 African Championship and the 2019 FIBA Under-19 Basketball World Cup. He joined the senior national team for the first time in June 2022, and played his first major tournament at the FIBA AfroBasket 2025. At AfroBasket 2025, Boissy and Senegal won a bronze medal, following their win over Cameroon in the consolation game. In the third place game, Boissy scored a tournament record 40 points, breaking the former AfroBasket record by Jeff Xavier in 2009.

== Honours ==
Al Ahli Tripoli

- BAL champion: 2025
- FIBA Intercontinental Cup bronze medal: 2025

Urunani

- Viva Basketball League: 2024

AS Douanes

- Saint Michel Cup: 2023

Individual awards

- BAL Most Valuable Player: 2025
- All-BAL First Team: 2023
- BAL All-Defensive Team
  - First Team: 2023, 2025
  - Second Team: 2024
- VBL Finals MVP: 2024
- Saint Michel Cup Final MVP: 2023

== BAL career statistics ==
Legend
GP	Games played	GS	Games started	MPG	Minutes per game
FG%	Field goal percentage	3P%	3-point field goal percentage	FT%	Free throw percentage
RPG	Rebounds per game	APG	Assists per game	SPG	Steals per game
BPG	Blocks per game	PPG	Points per game	**Bold**	Career high
*	Led the league

Year	Team	GP	GS	MPG	FG%	3P%	FT%	RPG	APG	SPG	BPG	PPG
2023	AS Douanes	8	0	22.4	.333	.263	**.850**	4.0	3.5	**2.4**	**0.1**	16.5
2024	AS Douanes	8	**8**	25.0	.310	.091	.656	**5.0**	**4.9**	1.9	0.0	10.9
2025	Al Ahli	**10**	0	**26.6**	**.414**	**.419**	.800	4.8	1.8	2.3	0.1	**18.9***
