= 2009 African Fencing Championships =

The 2009 African Fencing Championships were the ninth edition of a top-level fencing competition organized by the African Fencing Confederation.

The events were held in Dakar, Senegal from 6 to 9 August at the Marius Ndiaye Stadium. Fifteen of twenty-three participating countries competed and there were six weapon categories.

== Medal summary ==
=== Men's events ===
Event	Gold	Silver	Bronze
Foil	Alaaeldin Abouelkassem (EGY)	Tarek Fouad (EGY)	Tarek Magdy (EGY); Mohamed Ayoub Ferjani (TUN)
Épée	Ayman Alaa El Din Fayz (EGY)	Ahmed El Kafrawy (EGY)	Mohaned Seif El Din (EGY); Mohamed Ayoub Ferjani (TUN)
Sabre	Mamoudou Keita (SEN)	Iheb Ben Chaabene (TUN)	Souhaieb Sakrani (TUN); Samir Mahmoud (EGY)
Team Foil	Egypt	Tunisia	South Africa
Team Épée	Egypt	Tunisia	Morocco
Team Sabre	Tunisia	Egypt	Senegal

=== Women's events ===
Event	Gold	Silver	Bronze
Foil	Inès Boubakri (TUN)	Shaimaa El-Gammal (EGY)	Haifa Jabri (TUN); Iman Shaban (EGY)
Épée	Sarra Besbes (TUN)	Mona Abdel Aziz (EGY)	Aya El sayed (EGY); Imene Ben Chaabane (TUN)
Sabre	Azza Besbes (TUN)	Chaima Fathalli (TUN)	Hela Besbes (EGY); Amira Ben Chaabane (TUN)
Team Foil	Tunisia	Egypt	Morocco
Team Épée	Tunisia	Egypt	South Africa
Team Sabre	Tunisia	Senegal	Morocco

== Medal table ==
Host

* Host nation (Senegal)

Rank	Nation	Gold	Silver	Bronze	Total
1	Tunisia	7	4	6	17
2	Egypt	4	7	6	17
3	Senegal*	1	1	1	3
4	Morocco	0	0	3	3
5	South Africa	0	0	2	2
Totals (5 entries)		12	12	18	42
