= 1976 FIBA Intercontinental Cup =

- League: FIBA Intercontinental Cup
- Sport: Basketball
- Finals champions: (Spain) Real Madrid
- Runners-up: (Italy) Mobilgirgi Varèse

FIBA Intercontinental Cup seasons
- ← 1975 FIBA Intercontinental Cup 1977 FIBA Intercontinental Cup →

The 1976 FIBA Intercontinental Cup William Jones was the 10th edition of the FIBA Intercontinental Cup for men's basketball clubs. It took place at Buenos Aires, Argentina.

== Participants ==
Continent	Teams	Clubs	
Europe	2	(Italy) Mobilgirgi Varèse	(Spain) Real Madrid
South America	2	(Argentina) Obras Sanitarias	(Brazil) Amazonas Franca
Africa	1	(Senegal) ASFA	
North America	1	(United States) Missouri Tigers	

== League stage ==
Day 1, October 1, 1976

Team 1	Score	Team 2
Real Madrid (Spain)	83–70	(Brazil) Amazonas Franca
Obras Sanitarias (Argentina)	97–42	(Senegal) ASFA
Mobilgirgi Varèse (Italy)	89–66	(United States) Missouri Tigers

Day 2, October 2, 1976

Team 1	Score	Team 2
Real Madrid (Spain)	89–51	(Senegal) ASFA
Mobilgirgi Varèse (Italy)	68–67	(Brazil) Amazonas Franca
Missouri Tigers (United States)	65–85	(Argentina) Obras Sanitarias

Day 3, October 3, 1976

Team 1	Score	Team 2
ASFA (Senegal)	46–94	(Italy) Mobilgirgi Varèse
Missouri Tigers (United States)	67–80	(Brazil) Amazonas Franca
Real Madrid (Spain)	109–89	(Argentina) Obras Sanitarias

Day 4, October 4, 1976

Team 1	Score	Team 2
Missouri Tigers (United States)	85–45	(Senegal) ASFA
Obras Sanitarias (Argentina)	80–76	(Brazil) Amazonas Franca
Real Madrid (Spain)	79–74	(Italy) Mobilgirgi Varèse

Day 5, October 5, 1976

Team 1	Score	Team 2
ASFA (Senegal)	57–89	(Brazil) Amazonas Franca
Missouri Tigers (United States)	97–102	(Spain) Real Madrid
Mobilgirgi Varèse (Italy)	81–77	(Argentina) Obras Sanitarias

== Final standings ==
	Team	Pld	Pts	W	L	PF	PA
1.	(Spain) Real Madrid	5	10	5	0	462	381
2.	(Italy) Mobilgirgi Varèse	5	9	4	1	406	335
3.	(Argentina) Obras Sanitarias	5	8	3	2	428	373
4.	(Brazil) Amazonas Franca	5	7	2	3	382	355
5.	(United States) Missouri Tigers	5	6	1	4	380	401
6.	(Senegal) ASFA	5	5	0	5	241	454

1976 FIBA Intercontinental Cup Champions

Real Madrid
1st title
