= Saint Michel Cup =

Annual Senegalese basketball competition

- Organising body: Ligue de Dakar de Basket
- Founded: 1974
- Countries: Senegal
- Current champions: DUC (8th title) (2025)
- Most championships: Jeanne d'Arc (13 titles)

The Saint Michel Cup (in French: Coupe du Saint-Michel) is an annual Senegalese basketball cup competition that is organized by the Ligue de Dakar de Basket (LBBD). Jeanne d'Arc holds the record for most won titles with 13. The competition is sponsored by the UCAO Saint Michel, a private university located in Dakar.

== Finals ==
Season	Champions	Runners-up	Score	MVP	Ref.
1974	Dial Diop				
1975	ASFA				
1976	Police				
1977	ASFA (2)				
1978	Jeanne d'Arc				
1979	ASFA (3)				
1980	ASFA (4)				
1981	Police (2)				
1982	Police (3)				
1983	Police (4)				
1984	ASFA (5)				
1985	Jeanne d'Arc (2)				
1986	Jeanne d'Arc (3)				
1987	ASFA (6)				
1988	Jeanne d'Arc (4)				
1989	Jeanne d'Arc (5)				
1990	Jeanne d'Arc (6)				
1991	Jeanne d'Arc (7)				
1992	ASFA (7)				
1993	AS Douanes (2)				
1994	ASFA (8)				
1995	ASFA (9)				
1996	Bopp (1)				
1997	Jeanne d'Arc (8)				
1998	Jeanne d'Arc (9)				
1999	Jeanne d'Arc (10)				
2000	Bopp (3)				
2001	Jeanne d'Arc (11)				
2002	US Gorée				
2003	Jeanne d'Arc (12)				
2004	Bopp (4)				
2005	AS Douanes				
2006	Bopp (5)				
2007	AS Douanes (3)				
2008	Bopp (6)				
2009	DUC				
2010	DUC (2)	AS Douanes	65–60	–	
2011	Mermoz	US Gorée	77–68	–	
2012	DUC (3)	Mermoz	84–69	–	
2013	DUC (4)				
2014	DUC (5)				
2015	DUC (6)	ASFA	65–61		
2016	US Ouakam	Mermoz	59–52	Moussa Cissé	
2017	DUC (7)	US Ouakam	65–55	Samba Daly Fall	
2018	AS Douanes (4)	US Ouakam	61–50	Pape Moustapha Diop	
2019	US Ouakam (2)	AS Douanes	59–51	Mamadou Faye	
2022	Jeanne d'Arc (13)	AS Douanes	65–53	Momath Seck	
2023	AS Douanes (5)	ASC Ville de Dakar	75–73	Jean Jacques Boissy	
2024	ASC Ville de Dakar	GBA	69–62	Serigne Saliou Gueye	
2025	DUC (8)	ASC Ville de Dakar	71–68	Bassirou Ba	
