= Alkaly Ndour =

Senegalese basketball player

No. 00 – AS Douanes
- Position: Point guard
- League: Nationale 1 Basketball Africa League

Personal information
- Born: 2 March 1997 (age 29)
- Listed height: 1.92 m (6 ft 4 in)
- Listed weight: 70 kg (154 lb)

Career information
- Playing career: 2012–present

Career history
- 2012–2016: ASCC Bopp
- 2016–present: AS Douanes

Career highlights
- 5× Senegalese League champion (2017–2019, 2022, 2023); 3× Senegalese Cup champion (2017, 2019, 2021)

Alkaly Mamadou Ndour (born 2 March 1997) is a Senegalese basketball player for AS Douanes and Senegal.

== Professional career ==
Ndour started his professional career in 2012 when he started playing for ASCC Bopp in the Senegalese Nationale 1. In 2016, he transferred to AS Douanes. Since the 2017–18 season, he is the starting point guard for the team. In May 2021, he played with Douanes in the 2021 BAL season.

Ndour was the starting point guard for AS Douanes in the 2023 BAL season as well, an extremely successful season for the team as the Senegalese were the runners-up.

== National team career ==
Alkaly plays for the Senegal national basketball team and after being in the pre-selection in 2018 and 2019, he made his debut in the AfroBasket 2021 qualifying rounds.

== Career statistics ==
=== BAL ===
Legend
GP	Games played	GS	Games started	MPG	Minutes per game
FG%	Field goal percentage	3P%	3-point field goal percentage	FT%	Free throw percentage
RPG	Rebounds per game	APG	Assists per game	SPG	Steals per game
BPG	Blocks per game	PPG	Points per game	**Bold**	Career high

Year	Team	GP	GS	MPG	FG%	3P%	FT%	RPG	APG	SPG	BPG	PPG
2021	AS Douanes	4	4	17.2	**.353**	**.200**	**.500**	2.8	4.3	1.3	0.0	**3.8**
2023	AS Douanes	**8**	**8**	**21.5**	.313	.000	.167	**3.1**	**4.4**	**1.4**	0.1	2.6
2023	AS Douanes	8	8	11.9	.200	.000	**.500**	1.8	1.8	0.8	**0.3**	0.9
