= 1981 FIBA Club World Cup =

- League: FIBA Club World Cup
- Sport: Basketball
- Finals champions: (Spain) Real Madrid
- Runners-up: (Brazil) Sírio

FIBA Intercontinental Cup seasons
- ← 1980 FIBA Intercontinental Cup 1982 FIBA Intercontinental Cup →

The 1981 FIBA Club World Cup was the 15th edition of the FIBA Intercontinental Cup for men's basketball clubs. It was the first edition of the competition that was held under the name of FIBA Club World Cup. It took place at São Paulo, Brazil.

== Participants ==
Continent	Teams	Clubs			
South America	4	(Argentina) Ferro Carril Oeste	(Brazil) Sírio	(Venezuela) Guaiqueríes de Margarita	(Brazil) Atlética Francana
Europe	2	(Israel) Maccabi Elite	(Spain) Real Madrid		
Africa	1	(Senegal) ASFA			
Asia	1	(China) Bayi Rockets			
North America	1	(United States) Clemson Tigers			
Oceania	1	(Australia) St. Kilda Saints			

== Sources ==
- 1981 edition^{[usurped]}

== Group stage ==
=== Group A ===
	Team	Pld	Pts	W	L	PF	PA
1.	(Spain) Real Madrid	4	8	4	0	416	360
2.	(Brazil) Sírio	4	7	3	1	435	369
3.	(United States) Clemson Tigers	4	6	2	2	416	406
4.	(China) Bayi Rockets	4	5	1	3	352	429
5.	(Venezuela) Guaiqueríes de Margarita	4	4	0	4	397	452

Day 1, June 26, 1981

Team 1	Score	Team 2
Real Madrid (Spain)	115–109	(United States) Clemson Tigers
Bayi Rockets (China)	82–114	(Brazil) Sírio

Day 2, June 27, 1981

Team 1	Score	Team 2
Real Madrid (Spain)	107–71	(China) Bayi Rockets
Guaiqueríes de Margarita (Venezuela)	100–131	(Brazil) Sírio

Day 3, June 28, 1981

Team 1	Score	Team 2
Clemson Tigers (United States)	101–91	(China) Bayi Rockets
Guaiqueríes de Margarita (Venezuela)	92–102	(Spain) Real Madrid

Day 4, June 29, 1981

Team 1	Score	Team 2
Clemson Tigers (United States)	111–98	(Venezuela) Guaiqueríes de Margarita
Sírio (Brazil)	88–92	(Spain) Real Madrid

Day 5, June 30, 1981

Team 1	Score	Team 2
Bayi Rockets (China)	108–107	(Venezuela) Guaiqueríes de Margarita
Sírio (Brazil)	102–95	(United States) Clemson Tigers

=== Group B ===
	Team	Pld	Pts	W	L	PF	PA
1.	(Brazil) Atlética Francana	4	8	4	0	365	306
2.	(Argentina) Ferro Carril Oeste	4	7	3	1	363	320
3.	(Australia) St. Kilda Saints	4	6	2	2	367	381
4.	(Israel) Maccabi Elite	4	5	1	3	372	348
5.	(Senegal) ASFA	4	4	0	4	235	387

Day 1, June 26, 1981

Team 1	Score	Team 2
Maccabi Elite (Israel)	96–63	(Senegal) ASFA
Atlética Francana (Brazil)	90–75	(Argentina) Ferro Carril Oeste

Day 2, June 27, 1981

Team 1	Score	Team 2
Maccabi Elite (Israel)	82–87	(Brazil) Atlética Francana
St. Kilda Saints (Australia)	86–100	(Argentina) Ferro Carril Oeste

Day 3, June 28, 1981

Team 1	Score	Team 2
ASFA (Senegal)	60–89	(Brazil) Atlética Francana
St. Kilda Saints (Australia)	100–97	(Israel) Maccabi Elite

Day 4, June 29, 1981

Team 1	Score	Team 2
ASFA (Senegal)	65–112	(Australia) St. Kilda Saints
Ferro Carril Oeste (Argentina)	98–97	(Israel) Maccabi Elite

Day 5, June 30, 1981

Team 1	Score	Team 2
Atlética Francana (Brazil)	99–89	(Australia) St. Kilda Saints
Ferro Carril Oeste (Argentina)	90–47	(Senegal) ASFA

== Places 7–10 ==
	Team	Pld	Pts	W	L	PF	PA
7.	(Israel) Maccabi Elite	3	5	2	1	299	246
8.	(Venezuela) Guaiqueríes de Margarita	3	5	2	1	284	259
9.	(China) Bayi Rockets	3	5	2	1	288	284
10.	(Senegal) ASFA	3	3	0	3	188	270

Note: The individual scores in the League stage are accumulated.

Day 1, July 2, 1981

Team 1	Score	Team 2
Guaiqueríes de Margarita (Venezuela)	82–57	(Senegal) ASFA
Bayi Rockets (China)	88–109	(Israel) Maccabi Elite

Day 2, July 3, 1981

Team 1	Score	Team 2
ASFA (Senegal)	68–92	(China) Bayi Rockets
Guaiqueríes de Margarita (Venezuela)	95–94	(Israel) Maccabi Elite

== Places 1–6 ==
	Team	Pld	Pts	W	L	PF	PA
1.	(Spain) Real Madrid	5	10	5	0	561	460
2.	(Brazil) Sírio	5	9	4	1	484	458
3.	(United States) Clemson Tigers	5	8	3	2	507	506
4.	(Brazil) Atlética Francana	5	7	2	3	411	441
5.	(Argentina) Ferro Carril Oeste	5	6	1	4	464	490
6.	(Australia) St. Kilda Saints	5	5	0	5	487	559

Note: The individual scores in the League stage are accumulated.

Day 1, July 2, 1981

Team 1	Score	Team 2
Real Madrid (Spain)	115–100	(Argentina) Ferro Carril Oeste
Clemson Tigers (United States)	111–107	(Australia) St. Kilda Saints
Sírio (Brazil)	87–77	(Brazil) Atlética Francana

Day 2, July 3, 1981

Team 1	Score	Team 2
Ferro Carril Oeste (Argentina)	97–103	(United States) Clemson Tigers
Real Madrid (Spain)	101–60	(Brazil) Atlética Francana
Sírio (Brazil)	111–102	(Australia) St. Kilda Saints

Day 3, July 4, 1981

Team 1	Score	Team 2
Atlética Francana (Brazil)	85–89	(United States) Clemson Tigers
Real Madrid (Spain)	138–103	(Australia) St. Kilda Saints
Sírio (Brazil)	96–92	(Argentina) Ferro Carril Oeste

=== 3rd place game ===
July 5, 1981

Team 1	Score	Team 2
Clemson Tigers (United States)	79–73	(Brazil) Atlética Francana

=== Final ===
July 5, 1981

Team 1	Score	Team 2
Real Madrid (Spain)	109–83	(Brazil) Sírio

1981 Intercontinental Champions

Real Madrid
4th title

== Final standings ==
	Team
Gold medal	(Spain) Real Madrid
Silver medal	(Brazil) Sírio
Bronze medal	(United States) Clemson Tigers
4.	(Brazil) Atlética Francana
5.	(Argentina) Ferro Carril Oeste
6.	(Australia) St. Kilda Saints
7.	(Israel) Maccabi Elite
8.	(Venezuela) Guaiqueríes de Margarita
9.	(China) Bayi Rockets
10.	(Senegal) ASFA
