= Ndéye Séne =

Senegalese basketball player (born 1988)

No. 9 – DUC Dakar
- Position: Guard
- League: SBL

Personal information
- Born: 18 January 1988 (age 38) Saint-Louis, Senegal
- Listed height: 1.68 m (5 ft 6 in)

Career information
- WNBA draft: 2010: undrafted
Medals
Women's basketball
Representing Senegal
AfroBasket
Silver medal – second place	2017 Mali
Silver medal – second place	2019 Senegal

Ndéye Séne (born 18 January 1988) is a Senegalese basketball player for DUC Dakar and the Senegalese national team.

She participated at the 2017 Women's Afrobasket.
