= Pape Moustapha Diop =

Senegalese basketball player

Andrezieux
- Position: Power forward
- League: Nationale Masculine 2

Personal information
- Born: 1 January 1996 (age 30) Dakar, Senegal
- Listed height: 6 ft 8 in (2.03 m)

Career information
- College: Cape Breton (2017–2018)
- NBA draft: 2018: undrafted
- Playing career: 2018–present

Career history
- 2018–2019: Tallinna Kalev
- 2018–2021: AS Douanes
- 2021: DUC
- 2021–2022: Joeuf-Homécourt Basket
- 2022–present: Andrezieux

Career highlights
- 3× NM1 champion (2018, 2019, 2021); 2× NM1 MVP (2018, 2019); NM1 Finals MVP (2019); Senegalese Cup winner (2019); Senegalese Cup MVP (2019)
Medals
Men's basketball
Representing Senegal
AfroBasket
Bronze medal – third place	2021 Rwanda
Bronze medal – third place	2025 Angola

Pape Moustapha Diop (born 1 January 1996) is a Senegalese basketball player. He plays for the Senegal national basketball team and Andrezieux in France.

== College career ==
A Dakar native, Diop played college basketball in Canada for Cape Breton University of Sydney. He averaged 2.5 points in 12.5 minutes per game in the 2017–18 season. On January 13, 2018, Diop scored a career-high 11 points in a 114–93 loss against UNB.

== Professional career ==
Diop played for the Estonian Side BC Tallinna Kalev in the 2018–19 season, he averaged 1.25 points, 0.75 rebound and 0.25 assists per game.

In 2019, Diop returned to Senegal to play for AS Douanes. On November 4, 2019, he was named the MVP of the Senegalese Basketball Cup after a 28 points and 13 rebounds performance in the final. In the same season, he also won the Nationale 1 title and was named the league's Finals MVP.

In 2021, he transferred to DUC Dakar.

In the 2021–22 season, Diop plays for Joeuf-Homécourt Basket in the National Masculine 2, the French fourth tier level. He scored 37 points in his debut against Étoile Charleville-Mézières.

== National team career ==
Diop represented the Senegal national basketball team at the 2019 FIBA Basketball World Cup qualification where he averaged 2 points, 2.3 rebound and 0.5 assists per game. He also played at the 2019 FIBA Basketball World Cup in China, where he averaged 3 points, 1 rebound and 0.2 assists per game. Diop also played at FIBA AfroBasket 2021, helping the team win a bronze medal.
