= Louga BC =

- Nickname: LBC
- League: Nationale 1
- Founded: 2007
- History: Louga BC (2007–present)
- Location: Louga, Senegal
- Championships: 1 Senegalese Cup
Home

Louga Basket Club, also known simply as Louga or LBC, is a Senegalese basketball club based in Louga. The team competes in the Nationale 1, the highest national level.

== History ==
The club Louga BC was founded after the merger of Ndiambour Basket and Union Sportif de Louga (USL) in 2007. The two teams played in the lower levels of basketball before.

Later, Moustapha Diop, mayor of Louga, became the team's main sponsor and invested more than CFA 30 million in the team.

In 2016, Louga won the Senegalese Basketball Cup, the first trophy in club history and became the first team from the Louga Region to win a national trophy. Mouhamadou Lamine Diop was named the final MVP.

== Honours ==
- Senegalese Basketball Cup

Champions (1): 2016

== Season by season ==
Season	League	Result	Pld	W	L	Playoffs
2019	NM1	7th	16	8	8	DNQ
2021	NM1	3rd (A)	14	9	5	Lost quarterfinals (DUC, 0–2)
2022	NM1	5th (B)	14	7	7	DNQ
2023	NM1	2nd (A)	14	8	6	Lost quarterfinals (ASCV, 0–2)
2024	NM1	5th (B)	14	6	8	DNQ
Regular season record			72	38	34	2 playoff appearances
Playoffs record			4	0	4	2 playoff appearances
