= Adama Diakhite =

Senegalese basketball player (born 1997)

No. 28 – AS Douanes
- Position: Center
- League: BAL

Personal information
- Born: 12 April 1997 (age 29)
- Listed height: 6 ft 9 in (2.06 m)

Career information
- College: Diliman College (2017–2018); UE (2018–2022)
- Playing career: 2022–present

Career history
- 2022: DUC
- 2022–2023: Cergy-Pontoise BB
- 2023: AS Douanes
- 2023: Urunani
- 2023: Al-Gharafa
- 2024–present: AS Douanes

Career highlights
- Senegalese Cup winner (2022); Senegalese Cup Final MVP (2022)

Adama Alex Diakhite (born 12 April 1997) is a Senegalese basketball player who plays for AS Douanes of the Nationale 1 and the Basketball Africa League (BAL). A 6 ft 9 in (2.06 m) center, he played college basketball in the Philippines before turning professional in 2022.

== College career ==
In 2017, Diakhite started playing played collegiate basketball in the Philippines for Diliman College. He transferred to the University of the East Red Warriors in 2018. He averaged 17.6 points and 13.7 rebounds per game in his first season with UE.

== Professional career ==
In December 2021, Diakhite was announced as a new member of the Senegalese champions DUC Dakar. On 5 March, Diakhite made his professional debut in the Basketball Africa League (BAL) by scoring 17 points in a loss against SLAC. On 11 March, he scored a career-high 30 points along with 11 rebounds and 2 blocks to power his team past REG. Over five games, he averaged a team-high 16.4 points and 6.2 rebounds per game for DUC.

On 28 October 2022, DUC won the Senegalese Cup, with Diakhite being honoured as Final MVP after scoring 18 points in the final.

In November, Diakhite left Sengeal for France to play for Cergy-Pontoise of the third-level NM1.

Diakhite played for Burundian side Urunani during the playoffs of the Burundian Basketball Championship.

In April 2023, Diakhite joined AS Douanes for the playoffs of the 2023 BAL season. He helped the Douanes reach the final, the first in club history.

In November 2023, he joined Al-Gharafa of the Qatari Basketball League (QBL).

== BAL career statistics ==
Legend
GP	Games played	GS	Games started	MPG	Minutes per game
FG%	Field goal percentage	3P%	3-point field goal percentage	FT%	Free throw percentage
RPG	Rebounds per game	APG	Assists per game	SPG	Steals per game
BPG	Blocks per game	PPG	Points per game	**Bold**	Career high

Year	Team	GP	GS	MPG	FG%	3P%	FT%	RPG	APG	SPG	BPG	PPG
2022	DUC	5	3	28.0	.574	.333	.647	6.2	0.4	1.0	0.4	16.4
2023	AS Douanes	3	0	14.7	.400	.000	.700	2.7	.0	1.3	.0	6.3
