= US Ouakam (basketball) =

- Nickname: The Ouakamois
- League: Nationale 1
- Founded: 1951
- Location: Ouakam, Dakar, Senegal
- Team manager: Ibrahim Cherif Aïdara
- Championships: 2 Saint Michel Cups
Home

Union Sportive de Ouakam, also known simply as US Ouakam or USO, is a Senegalese basketball club based in the Ouakam subdivision of Dakar. The team competes in the Nationale 1, the highest national level.

== Honours ==
- Saint-Michel Cup

Winners (2): 2016, 2019

== Season by season ==
Only including season starting from the 2019 season.

Season	Group	Regular season				Playoffs
Season	Group	Finish	Wins	Losses	Pct.	Playoffs
US Ouakam
2019	–	2nd	13	3	.813	Lost semifinals (DUC) 1–2
2020	Cancelled due to the COVID-19 pandemic					
2021	Group A	4th	9	5	.643	Lost quarterfinals (ASCVD) 0–2
2022	Group B	2nd	10	4	.714	Won quarterfinals (ASCVD) 2–1 Lost semifinals (DUC) 1–2
2023	Group A	3rd	8	6	.571	Lost quarterfinals (DUC) 1–2
2024	Group A	6th	3	9	.250	Will play in play-down
Regular season record			43	27	.614	
Playoff record			5	9	.357	

== Notable players ==
Note: Flags indicate national team eligibility at FIBA-sanctioned events. Players may hold other non-FIBA nationalities not displayed.

Criteria

To appear in this section a player must have either:

- Set a club record or won an individual award while at the club
- Played at least one official international match for their national team at any time
- Played at least one official NBA match at any time.

- (Senegal) Mamadou Faye

== Head coaches ==
- (Senegal) Ibrahim Cherif Aïdara (2021–present)
