= ASCC Bopp =

Senegalese basketball club

- League: Nationale 1
- Founded: 1969
- History: ASCC Bopp (1969–present)
- Location: Dakar, Senegal
- President: Amadou Niang

ASCC Bopp is a Senegalese basketball club based in Dakar. It plays in the Nationale 1, the highest national level. Established in 1969, Bopp has won the national championship four times.

== Honours ==
Nationale 1

- Champions (4): 1993, 1999, 2001, 2004

Nationale 2

- Runners-up (1): 2019

Cup of Senegal

- Champions (1): 1995

== Notable players ==
- Alkaly Ndour (4 seasons: 2012–16)

== Season by season ==
Season	Group	Regular season				Playoffs
Season	Group	Finish	Wins	Losses	Pct.	Playoffs
ASCC Bopp
2019	Promoted as runners-up from Nationale 2					
2020	Cancelled due to the COVID-19 pandemic					
2021	Group B	7th	4	10	.400	Play-down
2022	Group A	6th	4	10	.400	2nd in Play-down (6–2)
2023	Group A	6th	5	9	.357	1st in Play-down (4–4)
2024	Group A	4th	6	8	.429	Will play in play Play-down
Regular season record			19	37	.339	
Play-down record			10	6	.625	
