= Université Gaston Berger (basketball) =

UGB
- League: Nationale 1
- Location: Saint-Louis, Senegal
- Ownership: Gaston Berger University
- Championships: 1 Senegalese League; 2 Senegalese Cups
Home	Away

Université Gaston Berger, also known as UGB Saint-Louis or simply UGB, is a Senegalese basketball club based in Saint-Louis. The team competes in the Nationale 1, the highest national level. It is the basketball section of the Gaston Berger University. The team has won one Senegalese championship and two Cup titles.

== History ==
UGB won its first Senegalese Cup title in 2010, after beating DUC Dakar in the final. Two years later, in 2012, UGB won its first ever Nationale 1 title. A year later, it won its second cup title.

== Honours ==
Nationale 1

- Champions (1): 2012
- Runners-up (1): 2015

Senegalese Cup

- Champions (2): 2010, 2013

== Season by season ==
Season	League	Result	Pld	W	L	Playoffs
2019	NM1	12th	14	5	9	–
2021	NM1	4th (B)	14	7	7	Lost quarterfinals (AS Douanes, 0–2)
2022	NM1	3rd (B)	14	9	5	Lost quarterfinals (JA, 0–2)
2023	NM1	4th (A)	13	6	7	Lost quarterfinals (JA, 1–2)
2024	NM1	5th (A)	11	5	6	3rd in Final Eight Group A (3–3)
Regular season record			66	32	34	4 playoff appearances
Playoff record			10	4	10	4 playoff appearances
