= 2024 Nationale 1 Masculin season =

2024 Nationale 1 season
- League: Nationale 1
- Sport: Basketball
- Duration: February – 27 July 2024
- Number of teams: 16

Regular season
- Top scorer: Bara Ndiaye (ASC Ville de Dakar)

Finals
- Champions: ASCVD (1st title)
- Runners-up: DUC
- Finals MVP: Thierry Sagna (ASCVD)

Seasons
- ← 2023 2025 →

The 2024 Nationale 1 (N1) season was the 57th season of the Nationale 1 (NM1), the top-tier basketball league for men's teams in Senegal.

AS Douanes were the defending champions, but were eliminated in the semi-finals. ASCVD won their first national championship, after defeating DUC in the final. As champions, they qualified directly for the 2025 BAL season.

== Teams ==
Guédiawaye Academy and USPA were promoted. UCAD and ASFA were relegated to the Division 2 following their results in the 2022 season.

In January, it was announced that UCAD and Larry Diouf had merged and would keep playing in the NM1 under the name Larry Diouf.

| Team | Location |
|---|---|
| AS Douanes | Dakar |
| ASC Ville de Dakar | Dakar |
| ASC Thiès | Thiès |
| Bopp | Dakar |
| DUC Dakar | Dakar |
| Guédiawaye Academy | Dakar |
| Jeanne d'Arc | Dakar |
| Larry Diouf | Dakar |
| Louga | Louga |
| Mermoz | Dakar |
| SIBAC | Dakar (Sicap-Liberté) |
| UGB | Saint-Louis |
| USCT Port | Dakar |
| US Rail | Thiès |
| US Ouakam | Dakar (Ouakam) |
| USPA | Dakar (Parcelles Assainies Arrondissement) |

=== Coaching changes ===
| Team | 2023 season | 2024 season | Ref. |
|---|---|---|---|
| Louga | Madiene Fall | Ameth Gaye | |
| UGB | Ameth Gaye | | |
| US Ouakam | El Hadji Diakhaté | Idrissa Cissokho | |
| DUC | Parfait Advijon | El Hadji Diakhaté | |
| USCT Port | | Bengali Kaba | |

== Regular season ==
The official schedule was announced on 19 January 2024.

=== Group A ===
| Pos | Team | Pld | W | D | L | Pts | Qualification or relegation |
|---|---|---|---|---|---|---|---|
| 1 | ASCVD | 13 | 12 | 0 | 1 | 24 | Advance to playoffs |
| 2 | AS Douanes | 12 | 12 | 0 | 0 | 24 | Advance to playoffs |
| 3 | GBA | 14 | 8 | 0 | 6 | 16 | Advance to playoffs |
| 4 | Bopp | 14 | 6 | 0 | 8 | 12 | Advance to playoffs |
| 5 | UGB | 11 | 5 | 0 | 6 | 10 | Qualification for play-down |
| 6 | US Ouakam | 12 | 3 | 0 | 9 | 6 | Qualification for play-down |
| 7 | USCT Port | 14 | 3 | 0 | 11 | 6 | Qualification for play-down |
| 8 | SIBAC | 14 | 3 | 0 | 11 | 6 | Qualification for play-down |

Source: NBN23

=== Group B ===
| Pos | Team | Pld | W | L | Pts | Qualification or relegation |
|---|---|---|---|---|---|---|
| 1 | Jeanne d'Arc | 14 | 13 | 1 | 26 | Advance to playoffs |
| 2 | DUC | 14 | 12 | 2 | 24 | Advance to playoffs |
| 3 | Mermoz | 14 | 7 | 7 | 14 | Advance to playoffs |
| 4 | US Rail | 14 | 7 | 7 | 14 | Advance to playoffs |
| 5 | Louga | 14 | 6 | 8 | 12 | Qualification for play-down |
| 6 | ASUC Sports | 14 | 5 | 9 | 10 | Qualification for play-down |
| 7 | USPA | 14 | 3 | 11 | 6 | Qualification for play-down |
| 8 | ASFA | 14 | 3 | 11 | 6 | Qualification for play-down |

Source: NBN23

== Final Eight ==
The format of the league was changed this season, and as such the eight best teams played in two groups of four. The two highest placed teams advanced to the final four.

=== Group A ===
| Pos | Team | Pld | W | L | PF | PA | PD | Pts | Qualification or relegation | ASD | JA | UGB | USR |
|---|---|---|---|---|---|---|---|---|---|---|---|---|---|
| 1 | AS Douanes | 6 | 5 | 1 | 421 | 325 | +96 | 10 | Advance to Final Four | — | 80–73 | 63–34 | 85–42 |
| 2 | Jeanne d'Arc | 6 | 4 | 2 | 366 | 353 | +13 | 8 | Advance to Final Four | 50–66 | — | 64–54 | 65–54 |
| 3 | UGB | 6 | 3 | 3 | 370 | 347 | +23 | 6 | | 65–57 | 60–64 | — | 82–63 |
| 4 | US Rail | 6 | 1 | 5 | 370 | 424 | −54 | 2 | | 65–75 | 58–63 | 64–65 | — |

Source: NBN23

=== Group B ===
| Pos | Team | Pld | W | L | PF | PA | PD | Pts | Qualification or relegation | ASCVD | DUC | GBA | MBC |
|---|---|---|---|---|---|---|---|---|---|---|---|---|---|
| 1 | ASCVD | 6 | 5 | 1 | 366 | 307 | +59 | 10 | Advance to Final Four | — | 61–64 | 71–60 | 51–48 |
| 2 | DUC | 6 | 5 | 1 | 303 | 276 | +27 | 10 | Advance to Final Four | 55–62 | — | 62–52 | 60–34 |
| 3 | GBA | 6 | 1 | 5 | 334 | 368 | −34 | 2 (Note: Head-to-head: GBA wins tied series against MBC on aggregate points (+14).) | | 58–68 | 54–62 | — | 55–38 |
| 4 | MBC | 6 | 1 | 5 | 265 | 317 | −52 | 2 | | 44–61 | 46–50 | 48–45 | — |

Source: NBN23

== Final Four ==
The final four playoffs were played in best-of-three series, and the first games were played on 7 June 2024. ACVD advanced to the finals for the first time in club history, and went on to win its first national championship on 27 June 2024.

Semifinals
A1 | AS Douanes | 55 | 51 | 58 | 1
B2 | DUC | 52 | 55 | 66 | 2
B1 | ASCVD | 60 | 62 | 2
A2 | Jeanne d'Arc | 59 | 51 | 0

Finals
B2 | DUC | 45 | 0
B1 | ASCVD | 65 | 1

== Individual awards ==
- King of the Season (MVP): Mouhamed Doumbia, ASCVD
- Revelation of the Year: Ousmane Sagna, GBA
- Final MVP: Thierry Sagna (ASCVD)
