= Samba Daly Fall =

Senegalese basketball player (born 1999)

No. 2 – ASCVD
- Position: Small forward / Shooting guard
- League: N1; BAL

Personal information
- Born: 17 January 1999 (age 27) Louga, Senegal
- Listed height: 1.98 m (6 ft 6 in)

Career history
- –2021: DUC
- 2021–2023: AS Douanes
- 2023–2024: Joeuf-Homécourt
- 2024: AS Douanes
- 2025–present: ASCVD

Career highlights
- 2× NM1 champion (2022, 2023); NM1 MVP (2023); 2× NM1 Finals MVP (2022, 2023)
Medals
Men's basketball
Representing Senegal
Islamic Solidarity Games
Gold medal – first place	2021 Konya	3x3 basketball

Samba Daly "Pape" Fall (born 17 January 1999) is a Senegalese professional basketball player who currently plays for ASCVD of the N1 and the Basketball Africa League (BAL). A 1.98 m tall shooting guard or small forward, he has played for the Senegal national team. Fall is a two-time Nationale 1 Finals MVP (2022 and 2023) and a one-time season MVP winner (2023).

== Club career ==
Fall began his career with. He moved from DUC to. He was nominated for the league's MVP award in 2019.

Fall signed with AS Douanes in 2021. He guided Douanes to the 2022 title and was named Finals MVP after his play against DUC; following the team's title they qualified for the 2023 BAL season. On 22 May 2023, in the Sahara Conference, Fall scored 23 points, six rebounds and five assists against Ferroviário da Beira. Fall and Douanes went on to become the runners-up, becoming the first Senegalese team to reach the BAL final.

a feat that he repeated in the following 2023 season, this time after beating Jeanne d'Arc in the finals. In October 2023, Fall was named the Ligue 1 MVP (or "King of the Season") for a first time in his career.

Fall joined the French club Joeuf-Homécourt Basket for the 2022–23 season. In May 2024, returned to Douanes for the 2024 BAL season.

== National team career ==
Fall made his debut with the Senegal national team in August 2023 during the Pre-Qualifying Tournaments for the 2024 Olympics.
