= Nationale 1 Masculin =

Senegalese basketball league

Nationale 1
- Founded: 1971; 55 years ago
- First season: 1971
- Country: Senegal
- Confederation: FIBA Africa
- Number of teams: 16
- Level on pyramid: 1
- Relegation to: Nationale 2
- Domestic cup: Senegalese Cup
- Supercup: Senegalese Super Cup
- International cup: Basketball Africa League (BAL)
- Current champions: AS Douanes (12th title) (2026)
- Most championships: AS Douanes (12 titles)
- 2026 Nationale 1 Masculin season

The Nationale 1 Masculin (abbreviated as NM1; in English: National 1 Men) is the highest professional basketball league in Senegal. Established in 1971, the league consists of 16 teams.

Each season is finished with a final in a single-game elimination format, held at the Marius Ndiaye Stadium in Dakar. AS Douanes is the most successful team in NM1 history with 11 won titles.

The champions of the NM1 qualify directly for the regular season of the Basketball Africa League (BAL), the premiere continental league. The bottom two teams are relegated to the second division Nationale 2.

== Teams ==
The following 16 teams play in the 2022 season:

Team	Location
AS Douanes	Dakar
ASC Thiès	Thiès
Bopp	Dakar
ASFA	Dakar
DUC Dakar	Dakar
Jeanne d'Arc	Dakar
Louga	Louga
Mermoz BC	Dakar
Saint-Louis BC	Saint-Louis
Sibac BC	Dakar (Sicap-Liberté)
UGB	Saint-Louis
US Rail	Thiès
USO	Dakar (Ouakam)
US Parcelles Assainie	Dakar (Parcelles Assainies)
ASC Ville de Dakar	Dakar

== Champions ==
This is a list of the champions of the Senegalese championship:

- 2026: AS Douanes
- 2025: ASC Ville de Dakar
- 2024: ASC Ville de Dakar
- 2023: AS Douanes
- 2022: AS Douanes
- 2021: DUC Dakar
- 2020: None
- 2019 : Douanes
- 2018 : Douanes
- 2017 : Douanes
- 2016 : Douanes
- 2015 : DUC
- 2014 : Douanes
- 2013 : DUC
- 2012 : UGB
- 2011 : Douanes
- 2010 : DUC
- 2009 : DUC
- 2008 : Douanes
- 2007 : Douanes
- 2006 : Rail
- 2005 : Rail
- 2004 : Bopp
- 2003 : Gorée
- 2002 : JA
- 2001 : Bopp
- 2000 : Gorée
- 1999 : Bopp
- 1998 : Douanes
- 1997 : JA
- 1996 : JA
- 1995 : ASFA
- 1994 : ASFA
- 1993 : Bopp
- 1992 : JA
- 1991 : Gorée
- 1990 : JA
- 1989 : Gorée
- 1988 : SEIB
- 1987 : JA
- 1986 : JA
- 1985 : Gorée
- 1984 : ASFA
- 1983 : Police
- 1982 : Police
- 1981 : Police
- 1980 : ASFA
- 1979 : ASFA
- 1978 : ASFA
- 1977 : ASFA
- 1976 : ASFA
- 1975 : ASFA
- 1974 : ASFA
- 1973 : Dial Diop
- 1972 : Dial Diop
- 1971 : Gorée

== Recent finals ==
The finals were originally played in a single-game format. In 2022, the league switched to a best-of-three series format.

Year	Winner	Runner-up	Score	Finals MVP	Top scorer	Notes
2008	AS Douanes	Bopp	75–57			
2010	DUC (2)	US Gorée	61–55		El Hadj Djim Diallo	
2011	AS Douanes (3)	UGB				
2012	UGB	DUC	68–59	Mamadou N'Doye	Pape Mor Faye (21)	
2013	DUC (3)	UGB	63–57	Younouss Diop	Mohamed Diop (14)	
2014	AS Douanes (4)	ASFA	77–60	Birahim Gaye	Birahim Gaye (28)	
2015	DUC Dakar (5)	UGB	51–49	Adama Lo		
2016	AS Douanes (6)	SLBC	51–71			
2017	AS Douanes (7)	SLBC	71–61	Louis Adams	Louis Adams (21)	
2018	AS Douanes (8)	DUC	(Note: The final of the 2018 season was never finished due to a fight on the court.)			
2019	AS Douanes (9)	DUC	61–54	Pape Moustapha Diop		
2020	Cancelled due to the COVID-19 pandemic					
2021	DUC (4)	AS Douanes	66–65	Thierno Niang	Pape Fall (17)	
2022	AS Douanes (10)	DUC	2–0 (best-of-three)	Samba Daly Fall		
2023	AS Douanes (11)	JA	2-1 (best-of-three)	Samba Daly Fall		
2024	ASCVD (1)	DUC	65–45	Thierry Sagna		
2025	ASCVD (2)	JA	2–0 (best-of-three)	Bara Ndiaye	Saliou Gueye	
2026	AS Douanes (12)	ASCVD	2–0 (best-of-three)	Saliou Gueye		

== Performance by club ==
Teams shown in italics are no longer in existence.

Club	Winners	Runners-up	Seasons won	Seasons runners-up
AS Douanes	12	1	1998, 2007, 2008, 2011, 2014, 2016, 2017, 2018, 2019, 2022, 2023, 2026	2021
ASFA	10	1	1974, 1975, 1976, 1977, 1978, 1979, 1980, 1984, 1994, 1995	2014
JA	7	2	1986, 1987, 1990, 1992, 1996, 1997, 2002	2023, 2025
US Gorée	6	0	1971, 1985, 1989, 1991, 2000, 2003	–
DUC	5	5	2009, 2010, 2013, 2015, 2021	2012, 2018, 2019, 2022, 2024
Bopp	4	1	1993, 1999, 2001, 2004	2008
Police	3	0	1981, 1982, 1983	–
ASCVD	2	1	2024, 2025	2026
US Rail	2	0	2005, 2006	–
Dial Diop	2	0	1972, 1973	–
SEIB	1	0	1988	–
UGB	1	2	2012	2013, 2015
SLBC	0	2	–	2016, 2017

== Individual awards ==
=== King of the Season (Most Valuable Player) ===
The King of the Season award (in French: Roi du Saison) is given each year to the best performing player of the NM1 season. Since 2014, the awards were re-named to the most valuable player awards, in line with International practice.

Season	Winner	Team	Ref.
2010	Mouhamed Diop	UGB	
2011	Ibrahima Mbengue	AS Douanes	
2012	Mamadou N'Doye	UGB	
2013	Pape Mor Faye	UGB	
2014	Birahim Gaye	AS Douanes	
2015	Not awarded		
2016	Serigne Bamba Gueye	UGB	
2017	Louis Adams	AS Douanes	
2018	Pape Moustapha Diop	AS Douanes	
2019	Pape Moustapha Diop (2)	AS Douanes	
2021	Thierno Niang	DUC	
2022	Bara Ndiaye	AS Douanes	
2023	Samba Daly Fall	AS Douanes	
2024	Mouhamed Doumbia	ASCVD	

=== Revelation of the Year ===
Season	Winner	Team	Ref.
2011	Ibrahima Niang	DUC	
2012	Abdoulaye Ndoye	Sibac	
2013	Ibrahima Sankharé	US Rail	
2016	Papa Abdou Karim Kebe	US Ouakam	
2018	Brancou Badio	Saltigué	
2019	Yoro Barry	DUC	
2021	Jean Jacques Boissy	Sibac	
2022	Saliou Gueye	US Ouakam	
2023	Abdoulaye Dièye	DUC	
2024	Ousmane Sagna	GBA	

=== Coach of the Year ===
Season	Winner	Team	Ref.
2011	Cheikh Sarr	AS Douanes	
2012	Maguette Diop	DUC	
2013	Cheikh Sarr	Senegal national team	
2016	Pabi Guèye	AS Douanes	
2019	Pabi Guèye	AS Douanes	
2021	Sir Parfait Adjivon	DUC	
2022	Pabi Guèye	AS Douanes	
2023	Pabi Guèye	AS Douanes	

== Notable players ==
- Louis Adams
- Brancou Badio
- Bamba Diallo
- Pape Moustapha Diop
- Mamadou Faye
- Alkaly Ndour
- Mamadou N'Doye
- Thierno Niang
