= Senegalese Basketball Cup =

- Country: Senegal
- Confederation: FIBA Africa
- Related competitions: Nationale Men 1 Senegalese Super Cup; Saint Michel Cup
- Current champions: AS Douanes (9th title) (2024)
- Most championships: AS Douanes (7 titles)

The Senegalese Basketball Cup (French: Coupe du Senegal de basket) is an annual cup competition for men's basketball teams in Senegal. The cup is one of the main tournaments for men's teams, along with the Saint Michel Cup and the Super Cup.

The record holders for most Cup titles are AS Douanes, who have won nine cups.

== Finals ==
Year	Winner	Runner-up	Score	MVP	Notes
1975	ASFA (1)				
1976					
1977	ASFA (2)				
1978					
1979	ASFA (3)				
1980	ASFA (4)				
1981					
1982					
1983					
1984	ASFA (5)				
1985		US Rail			
1986					
1987	ASFA (6)				
1988					
1989					
1990					
1991					
1992	ASFA (7)				
1993					
1994	ASFA (8)				
1995	ASFA (9)				
1996					
1997					
1998					
1999					
2000	AS Douanes (1)				
2001					
2002					
2003					
2004	AS Douanes (2)				
2005					
2006	AS Douanes (3)				
2007					
2008					
2009	US Rail	AS Douanes	63–59	Gorgui Dieng	
2010	UGB (1)	DUC	74–61		
2011	AS Douanes (4)				
2012	AS Douanes (5)				
2013	UGB (2)	US Rail	62–52		
2014					
2015	DUC (1)				
2016	Louga (1)	AS Douanes	60–58	Mouhamadou Lamine Diop	
2017	AS Douanes (6)	DUC	63–49		
2018	SLBC (1)	AS Douanes	54–53	El Hadji Gning Fall (Saint Louis)	
2019	AS Douanes (7)	DUC	100–67	Pape Moustapha Diop (AS Douanes)	
2021	AS Douanes (8)	Jeanne d'Arc	72–71	Bamba Diallo (AS Douanes)	
2022	DUC (2)	Jeanne d'Arc	69–67	Adama Diakhite (DUC)	
2023	DUC (3)	ASCVD	72–55	Pape Djiby Boie (DUC)	
2024	AS Douanes (9)	GBA	78–56	Bara Diop	

== Performance by club ==
Club	Winners	Runners-up	Seasons won	Seasons lost
AS Douanes	9	3	2000, 2004, 2006, 2011, 2012, 2017, 2019, 2021, 2024	2016, 2018, 2009
DUC	3	2	2015, 2022, 2023	2010, 2017
US Rail	1	2	2009	1985, 2013
SLBC	1	—	2018	—
Louga	1	—	2016	—
UGB	2	—	2010, 2013	—
Jeanne d'Arc	—	2	—	2021, 2022
ASCVD	—	1	—	2023
GBA	—	1	—	2024

== See also ==
- Nationale 1 (Senegal)
- Saint Michel Cup
- Senegalese Super Cup (basketball)
