= US Gorée (basketball) =

- Leagues: Nationale 1
- Arena: Marius Ndiaye Stadium
- Location: Gorée Island, Dakar, Senegal
- President: Augustin Senghor
- Website: unionsportivegoreenne.com
Home

Union Sportive Gorée is a basketball club based in Gorée Island, east of the city centre of Dakar. They play in the top division in Senegalese basketball, the Nationale 1. Their home arena is the Marius Ndiaye Stadium. The team president is Augustin Senghor. The club has won six national championships.

== History ==
The basketball team was created in the 1960s and was one of the second sports department established. The club was the first participant in the national championships at the time only one division, the club was the first national champion. Gorée was the fourth club to have two titles in 1985. Gorée won back to back in 1991. Their fifth was in 2000 and their sixth and recent was in 2003.

== Arena ==
The team plays at Marius Ndiaye Stadium in the subdivision of Sicap Liberté II in Dakar. Teams based in the city that play in the arena include AS Douanes, Dakar Rapids and Sibac.

== Honours ==
- Nationale 1

Winners (6): 1971, 1985, 1989, 1991, 2000, 2003

== See also ==
- US Gorée
