= AS Forces Armées (basketball) =

- Leagues: Nationale 1
- Location: Dakar, Senegal
- Head coach: Ibrahima Badji
- Championships: 3 African Championships; 10 Senegalese Leagues; 9 Senegalese Cups
Home

AS Forces Armées, also known as ASFA, is a professional basketball team that is based in Senegal. They play in the Senegalese League. The team has won the Africa Clubs Championship three times, being behind only C.D. Primeiro de Agosto for most continental titles.

== History ==
AS Forces Armées won the FIBA Africa Clubs Champions Cup three times, in the years 1975, 1979, and 1981. They also competed at the 1976 edition and the 1981 edition of the Intercontinental Cup.

== Honours ==
- FIBA Africa Clubs Champions Cup

Winners (3): 1975, 1979, 1981

- Nationale 1

Winners (10): 1974, 1975, 1976, 1977, 1978, 1979, 1980, 1984, 1994, 1995

- Senegalese Cup

Winners (9): 1975, 1977, 1979, 1980, 1984, 1987, 1992, 1994, 1995

== Season by season ==
Only including seasons starting from 2019.

| Season | Group | Regular season | | | | Playoffs |
| Season | Group | Finish | Wins | Losses | Pct. | Playoffs |
|---|---|---|---|---|---|---|
ASFA
| 2019 | – | 5th | 11 | 5 | .688 | – |
| 2020 | Cancelled due to the COVID-19 pandemic | | | | | |
| 2021 | Group A | 6th | 3 | 11 | .214 | Play-down |
| 2022 | Group B | 5th | 5 | 9 | .357 | 5th in Play-down 3–5 |
| 2023 | Group A | 8th | 3 | 11 | .214 | 5th in Play-down 5–3 |
| 2024 | Group B | 8th | 3 | 11 | .214 | Will play in play-down |
| Regular season record | | | 25 | 43 | .368 | |
| Play-down record | | | 8 | 8 | .500 | |
