= Marius Ndiaye Stadium =

Basketball arena in Senegal

- Stade Marius Ndiaye
- Location within Senegal
- Location: Dakar, Senegal
- Coordinates: 14.71127°N 17.459453°W
- Capacity: 4,600

Tenants
- ASC Ville de Dakar; Dakar Rapids; AS Douanes; US Gorée; Sibac Dakar

Marius Ndiaye Stadium (Stade Marius Ndiaye) is an indoor arena in Dakar, Senegal, used primarily for basketball.

The arena was home to the FIBA Africa Championship for Women 2007 in September 2007. It was also used to host the 29th FIBA Africa Basketball Championship in 2017.

It was also the location for the 2009 African Fencing Championships, a zone championship for the Fencing World Cup.
