= Nationale 2 (Senegal) =

Nationale 2 (N2)
- Organising body: Senegalese Basketball Federation
- Country: Senegal
- Confederation: FIBA Africa
- Level on pyramid: 2
- Promotion to: Nationale 1
- Current champions: RS Yoff (1st title) (2024)

The Nationale 2, also named the Nationale Masculin 2 or the 2e Division, is the Senegalese second-level division for men's basketball teams. The champions and runners-up of the season are directly promoted to the Nationale 1 (N1), the domestic top-level league.

== Finals ==
Season	Champions	Runners-up	Finals score	Source
2019	ISEG Sports	ASCC Bopp	63–30	
2021	USCT Port	USPA	83–81	
2022	Larry Diouf	UCAD	91–72	
2023	USPA	Guédiawaye Academy	91–90	
2024	RS Yoff	ABAZ		

== Individual awards ==
Individual awards of the Nationale 2
Season	Finals MVP	Finals Top Scorer	Source
2019	Pape Gora Samb (ISEG)	Pepe Ka (ISEG)	
2022	Paul Sagna (Larry Diouf)	Omar Sadio Ngom (UCAD)	
2023	Alioune Badara Sy (USPA)		
