= Dakar Université Club (basketball) =

DUC Dakar
- Nickname: Les Étudiants (The Students)
- Leagues: Nationale 1
- Founded: 1956
- Arena: Marius Ndiaye Stadium
- Capacity: 3,000
- Location: Dakar, Senegal
- President: Elhadji Mapathé Touré
- Head coach: Sir Parfait Adjivon
- Ownership: Cheikh Anta Diop University
- Championships: 5 Senegalese Leagues; 3 Senegalese Cups; 8 Saint Michel Cups; 3 Mayor Cups
| Home | Away |

Dakar Université Club Basketball, also known simply as DUC or DUC Dakar, is a Senegalese basketball club based in Dakar. It is the basketball team of the Cheikh Anta Diop University. The team plays in the Nationale 1 and has won the league five times, its last being in 2021. Established in 1956, the team was founded as a basketball club and later became a multisports club, including football, athletics and more.

DUC plays in the Basketball Africa League (BAL) in the 2022 season, having qualified as national champions.

== History ==
The Dakar Université Club basketball team was founded in 1956.

The team had its first major success in 2009, when the Students won the Nationale 1 for the first time. This title was followed by three more championships in the 2010s (including 2010, 2013 and 2015). They also won the Senegalese Cup in 2015.

On 9 August 2021, DUC Dakar won its fifth national championship after defeating defending champions AS Douanes in the final. Thierno Niang was named the league's Finals MVP. As a result, the team qualified for the 2022 season of the Basketball Africa League (BAL).

In the Sahara Conference of the BAL, which was hosted in the team's home city Dakar, DUC finished in the 6th and last place of group play. The only game that was won was against Rwandan champions REG on 11 March, 92-86. DUC's point guard Hameed Ali led the BAL in assists, with 8.4 per game.

Following their BAL campaign, DUC won back-to-back Senegalese Cup titles in 2022 and 2023.

== Honours ==
Total: 18

=== Leagues ===
Nationale 1

- Winners (5): 2009, 2010, 2013, 2015, 2021
  - Runners-up (3): 1991, 1993, 2012

=== Cups ===
Senegalese Cup

- Winners (3): 2015, 2022, 2023

Saint-Michel Cup

- Winners (8): 2009, 2010, 2012, 2013, 2014, 2015, 2017, 2025

Mayor's Cup

- Winners (3): 2008, 2015, 2022

Trophée des Champions

- Winners (1): 2024

== Season by season ==
| Season | Tier | League | Regular season | | | | Playoffs | Senegalese Cup | International competitions | | Head coach |
| Season | Tier | League | Finish | Wins | Losses | Win% | Playoffs | Senegalese Cup | League | Result | Head coach |
|---|---|---|---|---|---|---|---|---|---|---|---|
DUC
| 2018 | 1 | Nationale 1 | 2nd | 8 | 2 | .800 | Won semifinals (SLBC, 2–1); Lost finals (AS Douanes, not finished) | | DNQ | | Parfait Adjivon |
| 2019 | 1 | Nationale 1 | 3rd | 12 | 4 | .750 | Won semifinals (Ouakam, 2–1); Lost finals (AS Douanes, 54–61) | Runners-up | DNQ | | Parfait Adjivon |
| 2020 | 1 | Nationale 1 | Cancelled due to the COVID-19 pandemic | | | | | | DNQ | | Parfait Adjivon |
| 2021 | 1 | Nationale 1 | 1st | 12 | 2 | .857 | Won quarterfinals (Louga, 2–0); Won semifinals (JA, 2–1); Won final (AS Douanes, 66–65) | | DNQ | | Parfait Adjivon |
| 2022 | 1 | Nationale 1 | 1st | 14 | 0 | 1.000 | Won quarterfinals (SIBAC, 2–0); Won semifinals (USO, 2–1); Lost finals (AS Douanes, 0–2) | Winners | BAL | 6th in Sahara Conference | Parfait Adjivon |
| 2023 | 1 | Nationale 1 | 1st | 10 | 3 | .769 | Won quarterfinals (USO, 2–1); Lost semifinals (JA, 1–2) | Winners | DNQ | | Parfait Adjivon |
| 2024 | 1 | Nationale 1 | 2nd | 12 | 2 | .857 | 2nd in Final Eight Group B (5–1) Won semifinals (AS Douanes, 2–1) Lost finals (ASCVD, 45–65) | TBD | DNQ | | |

== Players ==
=== 2022 roster ===
The following roster was used by DUC in the 2022 BAL season.

DUC Dakar roster
Players
Coaches

| Pos. | No. | Nat. | Name | Ht. | Wt. | Age |
|---|---|---|---|---|---|---|
| G | 00 | (Senegal) | Niang, Thierno | 1.85 m (6 ft 1 in) | 93 kg (205 lb) | 35 – 18 March 1990 |
| G | 1 | (United States) | Ali, Hadeem (I) | 1.88 m (6 ft 2 in) | 82 kg (181 lb) | 32 – 26 August 1993 |
| SG | 2 | (Senegal) | Diallo, Bamba | 1.91 m (6 ft 3 in) | 77 kg (170 lb) | 29 – 15 March 1996 |
| G | 5 | (Senegal) | Bâ, Bassirou | 1.88 m (6 ft 2 in) | | 29 – 18 August 1996 |
| PF | 7 | (Democratic Republic of the Congo) | Lufile, Chadrack (I) | 2.06 m (6 ft 9 in) | 120 kg (265 lb) | 35 – 11 September 1990 |
| PG | 10 | (Senegal) | Faye, Cheikh | 1.94 m (6 ft 4 in) | | 24 – 7 December 2001 |
| C | 11 | (Senegal) | Diop, Abel (C) | | | 24 – 27 December 2001 |
| F | 12 | (Senegal) | Gomis, Saint Cristophe | 2.00 m (6 ft 7 in) | | 27 – 16 August 1998 |
| PG | 14 | (Ivory Coast) | Sie, Abraham (I) | 1.80 m (5 ft 11 in) | 88 kg (194 lb) | 26 – 31 August 1999 |
| F | 15 | (Senegal) | Sané, Babacar (E) | 2.02 m (6 ft 8 in) | | 22 – 13 September 2003 |
| SF | 23 | (France) | Aboudou, Jordan (I) | 2.01 m (6 ft 7 in) | 95 kg (209 lb) | 35 – 30 January 1991 |
| C | 28 | (Senegal) | Diakhite, Adama | 2.06 m (6 ft 9 in) | | 28 – 12 April 1997 |
| PF/C | 45 | (Senegal) | Badji, Mamadou | 2.05 m (6 ft 9 in) | | 27 – 29 July 1998 |

Head coach

- (Senegal) Parfait Adjivon

Assistant coach(es)

- (Senegal) Khardiata Diop

Legend

- (C) Team captain
- (I) Import player
- (E): BAL Elevate player
- Injured

- Roster
Updated: 2022-03-05

=== Individual awards ===
Nationale 1 MVP

- Thierno Niang – 2021

Senegalese Cup Final MVP

- Adama Diakhite – 2022

=== Notable players ===
Note: Flags indicate national team eligibility at FIBA-sanctioned events. Players may hold other non-FIBA nationalities not displayed.

Criteria

To appear in this section a player must have either:

- Set a club record or won an individual award while at the club
- Played at least one official international match for their national team at any time
- Played at least one official NBA match at any time.

=== Men's team ===
- (Senegal) Bara Diop
- (Senegal) El Hadji Ndiaye
- (Senegal) Thierno Niang
- (Senegal) Babacar Sané

=== Women's team ===
- (Mali) Kadidia Maiga
- (Senegal) Ndéye Séne
