= ASC Ville de Dakar =

- League: Nationale 1 BAL
- Founded: 1980
- History: ' ASC Ville de Dakar' (1978–present)
- Arena: Marius Ndiaye Stadium
- Capacity: 4,600
- Location: Dakar, Senegal
- President: Yatma Diaw
- Head coach: Libasse Faye
- Championships: 2 N1 championship 1 Saint Michel Cup
- Website: ascvdbasketball.com
| Home | Away |

ASC Ville de Dakar, commonly known as its abbreviation ASCVD, is a Senegalese basketball club based in Dakar. The team competes in the Nationale 1, the highest national level, as well as in the Basketball Africa League (BAL) since 2025. The club was established in 1980, its men's team was founded in 2014.

The men's team won two championships in 2024 and 2025. The women's team have won five national championships, between 2019 and 2024.

== Men's team ==
In the 1980s, the basketball club was founded in the Abass Ndao Hospital, by the nurses and room women who worked in the structure. Dr. Pierre Moireau was the first leader of AS Ville, supported by a former basketball player named Mouhamadou Ndoye.

In the 2024 season, ASCVD won its first national championship under head coach Libasse Faye. In the final, DUC was defeated with a twenty-point margin behind MVP Thierry Sagna. As the champions, ASCVD qualified directly for the 2025 BAL season. They also won the Saint Michel Cup for the first time that season.

The following 2025 season, Ville de Dakar won a second consecutive N1 championship after defeating Jeanne d'Arc in the finals.

=== Honours ===
- Nationale 1
  - Champions (2): 2024, 2025
- Senegalese Cup
  - Runners-up (1): 2023
- Saint Michel Cup
  - Winners (1): 2024

=== Season by season ===
| Season | Group | Regular season | | | | Playoffs |
| Season | Group | Finish | Wins | Losses | Pct. | Playoffs |
|---|---|---|---|---|---|---|
ASCVD
| 2019 | – | 6th | 8 | 8 | .500 | |
| 2020 | Cancelled due to the COVID-19 pandemic | | | | | |
| 2021 | Group B | 2nd | 11 | 3 | .786 | |
| 2022 | Group A | 3rd | 9 | 5 | .643 | Lost quarterfinals (US Ouakam) 1–2 |
| 2023 | Group A | 2nd | 11 | 2 | .846 | Won quarterfinals (Louga BC) 2–0; Lost semifinals (AS Douanes) 0–2 |
| 2024 | Group A | 1st | 12 | 1 | .923 | Won semifinals (JA) 2–0; Won final (DUC) 65–45 |
| 2025 | Group A | 1st | 9 | 1 | .900 | Won semifinals (AS Douanes) 2–1; Won final (JA) 2–0 |
| Regular season record | | | 60 | 20 | .750 | |
| Playoff record | | | 10 | 5 | .667 | |

== Women's team ==
In 2017, the Ville de Dakar women's team won the Senegalese Cup for the first time. In 2018, the team repeated. In 2021, the third cup title was won. ASCVD won five consecutive Nationale 1 Féminine championships, between 2019 and 2024.

=== Honours ===
- Nationale 1 Féminin
  - Champions (5): 2019, 2021, 2022, 2023, 2024
- Senegalese Mayor Cup
  - Champions (4): 2017, 2018, 2021, 2024
