= Jeanne d'Arc (basketball) =

- Leagues: Nationale 1
- Founded: 23 April 1923; 102 years ago
- History: Jeanne d'Arc de Dakar; 1923–present
- Location: Dakar, Senegal
- Head coach: Mouhamed Sène
Home

Jeanne d'Arc de Dakar, also known as simply JA, is a Senegalese basketball team based in Dakar. It is part of the ASC Jeanne d'Arc multi-sports club which is most known for its football section. They have won seven Nationale 1 championships, the most recent being in 2002. In 1991, JA won the African Clubs Championship and was crowned the continental champion.

The most famous player of JA was Mathieu Faye, who has been enshrined into the FIBA Basketball Hall of Fame.

== Honours ==
African Clubs Championship

- Champions (1): 1991
  - Runners-up: 1992

Nationale 1

- Champions (7): 1986, 1987, 1990, 1992, 1996, 1997, 2002

Saint-Michel Cup (record)

- Winners (7): 1978, 1985, 1986, 1988, 1989, 2003, 2022

== Season by season ==
Season	Group	Regular season				Playoffs
Season	Group	Finish	Wins	Losses	Pct.	Playoffs
Jeanne d'Arc
2019	–	9th	9	8	.529	–
2020	Cancelled due to the COVID-19 pandemic					
2021	Group A	2nd	9	5	.643	Won quarterfinals (SLBC, 2–1); Lost semifinals (DUC, 1–2)
2022	Group B	2nd	9	5	.643	Won quarterfinals (UGB, 2–1); Lost semifinals (AS Douanes, 0–2)
2023	Group B	1st	12	2	.857	Won quarterfinals (UGB, 2–1); Won semifinals (DUC, 2–0); Lost finals (AS Douanes, 1–2)
2024	Group B	1st	13	1	.929	2nd in Group A of Final Eight (4–2); Lost semifinals (ASCVD, 0–2)
Regular season record			52	21	.716	
Playoff record			13	13	.500	
