= Saint Louis BC =

Saint Louis
- Nickname: SLBC
- League: Nationale 1
- Location: Saint-Louis, Senegal
- President: Baba Tandian
- Championships: 1 Senegalese Cup

Saint Louis Basket Club, better known as simply Saint Louis or SLBC, is a Senegalese basketball club based in Saint-Louis. The team competes in the Nationale 1, the highest national level.

== Honours ==
Nationale 1

- Runners-up (2): 2017, 2018

Senegalese Cup

- Winners (1): 2019
