= US Rail =

Senegalese football club

US Rail is a Senegalese football club based in Thiès, which is part of the Senegal National League.

== History ==
They played sometimes in the top division in Senegalese football. Their home stadium is Stade Maniang Soumaré.

== Basketball ==
The affiliated basketball team plays in the Senegal D-1.
