= 2022–23 US Monastir basketball season =

US Monastir
2022–23 season
- Championnat Pro A champions
- Tunisian Cup champions
- Head coach: Linos Gavriel (CNA); Miodrag Perišić (BAL)
- Arena: Mohamed-Mzali Sports Hall
- Championnat Pro A: Champions
- BAL: 5th place in Sahara Conference
- Tunisian Cup: Winners

The 2022–23 season of US Monastir was the 64th in the club's history. It is the club's third season in the Basketball Africa League (BAL). This season US Monastir was coached by Marouan Kechrid until October, when Linos Gavriel took over. However, Gavriel did not coach during the 2023 BAL season, where the head coaching duties were given to former BAL championship-winning Miodrag Perišić.

In February, Monastir was the first Tunisian team to play in the FIBA Intercontinental Cup. In the BAL season, they were surprisingly eliminated in the Sahara Conference, losing on tie-breakers to four other teams after the team had finished with a 3-2 record.

In the 2022–23 Championnat Pro A, US Monastir won their fifth consecutive national championship following their 3–1 finals series win over Club Africain.

== Roster ==
The following was US Monastir's roster of the 2023 BAL season:

US Monastir roster
Players
Coaches

| Pos. | No. | Nat. | Name | Ht. | Age |
|---|---|---|---|---|---|
| PG | 2 | (United States) | Randle, Jerome (I) | 1.75 m (5 ft 9 in) | 39 – 21 May 1987 |
| SG | 5 | (Tunisia) | Braiek, Omar | | 22 – 3 March 2004 |
| PF | 6 | (Senegal) | Thomas, Ibrahima (I) | 2.08 m (6 ft 10 in) | 39 – 7 February 1987 |
| SF | 7 | (Tunisia) | Marnaoui, Oussama | 1.96 m (6 ft 5 in) | 27 – 16 June 1999 |
| SG | 10 | (Tunisia) | Chouaya, Lassaad | 1.90 m (6 ft 3 in) | 37 – 22 August 1989 |
| PG | 11 | (Tunisia) | Mahemli, Houssem | 1.90 m (6 ft 3 in) | 26 – 14 February 2000 |
| PF | 12 | (Tunisia) | Addami, Ahmed | 2.03 m (6 ft 8 in) | 29 – 14 July 1997 |
| SG | 12 | (Tunisia) | Bouallegue, Amrou | 1.92 m (6 ft 4 in) | 30 – 24 December 1995 |
| F | 15 | (Tunisia) | Chennoufi, Ziyed | 2.01 m (6 ft 7 in) | 37 – 29 November 1988 |
| F | 23 | (Tunisia) | Lahyani, Firas | 2.03 m (6 ft 8 in) | 35 – 16 July 1991 |
| C | 24 | (Tunisia) | Ghyaza, Mokhtar | 2.06 m (6 ft 9 in) | 39 – 15 November 1986 |
| F/C | 41 | (Nigeria) | Abass, Churchill (E) | 2.03 m (6 ft 8 in) | 22 – 21 August 2004 |
| PF | 45 | (Tunisia) | Slimane, Radhouane (C) | 2.04 m (6 ft 8 in) | 46 – 16 August 1980 |

Head coach

- (Serbia) Miodrag Perišić

Assistant coach(es)

- (Tunisia) Zied Kechaou

Legend

- (C) Team captain
- (I) Import player
- (E): BAL Elevate player
- Injured

- Roster
Updated: September 25, 2023

== Transactions ==
=== In ===
| Date | Number | Name | Pos. | To | Note |
|---|---|---|---|---|---|
| 21 January 2023 | 2 | Jerome Randle | PG | Metropolitans 92 (France) | |
| 28 January 2023 | - | Deng Acuoth | C | Adelaide 36ers (Australia) | |
| 21 January 2023 | 10 | Michael Roll | G | Paris Basketball (France) | Signed only for the Intercontinental Cup. |
| 28 February 2023 | 41 | Churchill Abass | F/C | NBA Academy Africa | Drafted under the BAL Elevate program. |
| 1 March 2023 | 6 | Ibrahima Thomas | PF/C | Ohud Medina (Saudi Arabia) | |

=== Out ===
Including players that were on US Monastir roster in the 2022 BAL season.

| Date | Number | Name | Pos. | To | Note |
|---|---|---|---|---|---|
| 9 September 2022 | 10 | Solo Diabate | G | Petro de Luanda (Angola) | |
| 26 November 2022 | 0 | Michael Dixon | PG | Kolossos Rodou (Greece) | |
| November 2022 | 5 | Julius Coles Jr. | G | Al Morog (Libya) | |
| June 2022 | 13 | Ater Majok | C | Piratas de La Guaira (Venezuela) | |
| - | 28 | Mohamed Rassil | F | ES Radès (Tunisia) | |
| - | 12 | Charles Loic Onana | G | NBA Academy Africa | End of BAL Elevate program contract. |

== Games ==
=== FIBA Intercontinental Cup ===
US Monastir was the first-ever Tunisian team to play in the FIBA Intercontinental Cup, and the second representative from the BAL to play in the competition.

==== Semifinal ====
| 10 February 2023 | Lenovo Tenerife (Spain) | 112–42 | (Tunisia) US Monastir | San Cristóbal de La Laguna |
| 21:00 (UTC±0) | Scoring by quarter: 25–6, 27–10, 31–11, 29–15 |
| | Pts: Abromaitis 20; Rebs: Diagne 11; Asts: Huertas 7 | Boxscore | Pts: Randle 14; Rebs: Marnaoui 5 Asts: Ghyaza 3 | Arena: Santiago Martín Arena; Attendance: 4,062; Referees: Manuel Mazzoni (ITA), Scott Beker (AUS), Juan Fernández (ARG) |

==== Third place game ====
| 12 February 2023 | Rio Grande Valley Vipers (United States) | 107–84 | (Tunisia) US Monastir | San Cristóbal de La Laguna |
| 16:00 (UTC±0) | Scoring by quarter: 32–20, 31–17, 24–18, 20–29 |
| | Pts: Culver 34; Rebs: Stanley 5 Asts: Lecque 7 | Boxscore | Pts: Marnaoui 19; Rebs: Lahiani 8 Asts: Marnaoui 3 | Arena: Santiago Martín Arena; Referees: Manuel Mazzoni (ITA), Ahmed Al-Shuwaili (IRQ), Jean Ruhamiriza (RWA) |

=== Basketball Africa League ===
==== Sahara Conference ====
US Monastir was drawn in the Sahara Conference, which was held in the Dakar Arena in Dakar, Senegal.

| 12 March 2023 1 | Stade Malien (Mali) | 68–78 | (Tunisia) US Monastir | Dakar Arena, Dakar |
| 17:30 | Scoring by quarter: 15–23, 22–21, 12–16, 19–18 |
| | Pts: Berthe 34; Rebs: Diarra 14; Asts: Keita 3 | Boxscore | Pts: Randle 18; Rebs: Thomas 10; Asts: Randle 7 | Attendance: 883; Referees: Nate Cearley, Yann Vezo Davidson, Erick Otieno |

| 15 March 2023 2 | US Monastir (Tunisia) | 85–74 | (Nigeria) Kwara Falcons | Dakar Arena, Dakar |
| 16:00 | Scoring by quarter: 20–17, 23–20, 23–18, 28–20 |
| | Pts: Thomas 22; Rebs: Lahyani 10; Asts: Randle 8 | Livestats | Pts: Ezeh 22; Rebs: Monyyong 9 Asts: Mordi 6 | Attendance: 372 |

| 17 March 2023 3 | ABC Fighters (Ivory Coast) | 90–74 | (Tunisia) US Monastir | Dakar Arena, Dakar |
| 16:00 | Scoring by quarter: 21–27, 20–9, 17–18, 32–20 |
| | Pts: Harouna 33; Rebs: Obepka 9 Asts: Harouna, Fofana 3 | Boxscore | Pts: Randle 25; Rebs: Thomas 10; Asts: Randle 5 | Attendance: 800; Referees: Nate Cearley, Sara Elsharnouby, Arnold Moseya |

| 20 March 2023 4 | REG (Rwanda) | 79–84 | (Tunisia) US Monastir | Dakar Arena, Dakar |
| 19:30 | Scoring by quarter: 10–25, 20–13, 16–25, 33–21 |
| | Pts: Thomas 38; Rebs: Graham, Ndizeye 7 Asts: Thomas 4 | Livestats | Pts: Randle 32; Rebs: Thomas 7 Asts: Five players 3 | Attendance: 600; Referees: Nate Cearley, Kalume Tonton Banza, Erick Otieno |

| 21 March 2023 5 | US Monastir (Tunisia) | 60–76 | (Senegal) AS Douanes | Dakar Arena, Dakar |
| 19:30 | Scoring by quarter: 10–22, 22–10, 12–14, 16–20 |
| | Pts: Lahyani 15; Rebs: Slimane 9 Asts: Bouallegue, Slimane 3 | Livestats | Pts: Crawford 28; Rebs: Boissy, Ochereobia 7 Asts: Ndour 5 | Attendance: 6,761; Referees: Charles Watson, Aboolo Amr, Didier Gaga |

== Individual awards ==
- Championnat Pro A MVP: Radhouane Slimane
- Championnat Pro A Finals MVP: Oussama Marnaoui
- Tunisian Cup Final MVP: Oussama Marnaoui

== Player statistics ==
Legend
| GP | Games played | GS | Games started | MPG | Minutes per game |
| FG% | Field-goal percentage | 3P% | 3-point field-goal percentage | FT% | Free-throw percentage |
| RPG | Rebounds per game | APG | Assists per game | SPG | Steals per game |
| BPG | Blocks per game | PPG | Points per game |

=== BAL ===
US Monastir statistics
| Player | GP | MPG | FG% | 3FG% | FT% | RPG | APG | SPG | BPG | PPG |
|---|---|---|---|---|---|---|---|---|---|---|
| Ibrahima Thomas | 5 | 25.3 | .431 | .464 | .588 | 7.0 | 0.4 | 0.2 | 0.8 | 13.4 |
| Radhouane Slimane | 5 | 28.9 | .304 | .207 | .889 | 5.4 | 1.6 | 1.0 | 0.2 | 10.0 |
| Jerome Randle | 5 | 34.6 | .486 | .367 | .840 | 3.4 | 5.2 | 1.4 | 0.0 | 20.4 |
| Oussama Marnaoui | 5 | 14.1 | .385 | .316 | .583 | 1.0 | 1.2 | 0.8 | 0.6 | 6.6 |
| Houssem Mahemli | 5 | 8.1 | .250 | .000 | .500 | 1.0 | 0.6 | 0.0 | 0.0 | 1.0 |
| Firas Lahyani | 5 | 22.8 | .548 | .143 | .667 | 4.8 | 1.4 | 0.8 | 0.2 | 9.8 |
| Mokhtar Ghayaza | 5 | 24.5 | .722 | .000 | .800 | 5.8 | 1.4 | 1.2 | 0.6 | 6.8 |
| Lassaad Chouaya | 5 | 13.3 | .333 | .143 | .500 | 0.6 | 1.4 | 1.0 | 0.0 | 2.0 |
| Ziyed Chennoufi | 4 | 7.7 | .000 | .000 | 1.000 | 2.5 | 1.0 | 0.3 | 0.0 | 0.5 |
| Amrou Bouallegue | 5 | 17.3 | .467 | .273 | .000 | 1.6 | 2.2 | 0.6 | 0.2 | 3.4 |
| Omar Beriek | 1 | 0.7 | .000 | .000 | .000 | 1.0 | 0.0 | 0.0 | 0.0 | 0.0 |
| Ahmed Addami | 4 | 5.8 | .556 | .500 | .000 | 0.3 | 0.5 | 0.3 | 0.0 | 3.0 |
| Churchill Abass | 1 | 0.7 | .000 | .000 | .000 | 1.0 | 0.0 | 0.0 | 2.0 | 0.0 |
