= 2021–22 US Monastir basketball season =

Tunisian sports season

US Monastir
2021–22 season
- BAL champions
- Championnat Pro A champions
- Tunisian Cup champions
- President: Ahmed Belli
- Head coach: Miodrag Perišić
- Arena: Mohamed Mzali Sports Hall
- Championnat Pro A: Champions
- Tunisian Cup: Winners
- BAL season: Champions

The 2021–22 season was the 63rd season of the US Monastir men's basketball team and the 2nd of the team in the Basketball Africa League (BAL).

Monastir won both the Championnat National A and the Tunisian Basketball Cup. On May 28, 2022, it won its first-ever BAL championship after winning the 2022 BAL Finals over Petro de Luanda.

== Transactions ==
=== Departures ===
US Monastir Departures
| Name | Number | Pos. | Age | Height | To |
|---|---|---|---|---|---|
| Omar Abada | 00 | G | 28 | 1.88 | (Saudi Arabia) Al-Ittihad Jeddah |
| Makrem Ben Romdhane | 12 | F/C | 32 | 2.06 | (Portugal) Benfica |
| Chris Crawford | 2 | G | 28 | 2.06 | (Guinea) SLAC |
| Wael Arakji | 10 | G | 26 | 2.06 | (United Arab Emirates) Al-Jahra |

=== Incoming ===
US Monastir Reinforcements
| Name | Number | Pos. | Date | Former club |
|---|---|---|---|---|
| Solo Diabate | 10 | G | February 2, 2022 | (Egypt) Smouha |
| Michael Dixon | 00 | G | February 8, 2022 | (Poland) Wilki Morskie Szczecin |
| Julius Coles Jr. | 5 | G | May 11, 2022 | (Qatar) Al-Wakrah |

== US Monastir Roster in Basketball Africa League ==
From the past season, six players returned for their second BAL season. On May 11, Monastir signed Julius Coles Jr. ahead of the playoffs.

US Monastir roster
Players
Coaches

| Pos. | No. | Nat. | Name | Ht. | Age |
|---|---|---|---|---|---|
| G | 00 | (Georgia (country)) | Dixon, Michael (WI) | 1.85 m (6 ft 1 in) | 34 – 1 December 1990 |
| SG | 1 | (Tunisia) | Marnaoui, Oussama | 1.93 m (6 ft 4 in) | 26 – 16 June 1999 |
| SG | 2 | (Tunisia) | Jaziri, Naji | 1.89 m (6 ft 2 in) | 30 – 21 October 1994 |
| G | 5 | (United States) | Coles Jr., Julius (WI) | 1.96 m (6 ft 5 in) | 36 – 15 January 1989 |
| PG | 10 | (Ivory Coast) | Diabate, Mouloukou (AI) | 1.83 m (6 ft 0 in) | 37 – 21 July 1987 |
| PG | 11 | (Tunisia) | Mahemli, Houssem | 1.90 m (6 ft 3 in) | 25 – 14 February 2000 |
| G | 12 | (Cameroon) | Onana Awana, Charles Loic (E) | 2.00 m (6 ft 7 in) | 21 – 15 December 2003 |
| C | 13 | (South Sudan) | Majok, Ater (AI) | 2.08 m (6 ft 10 in) | 38 – 4 July 1987 |
| F | 15 | (Tunisia) | Methnani, Wassef | 1.98 m (6 ft 6 in) | 26 – 7 August 1998 |
| SF | 23 | (Tunisia) | Lahyani, Firas | 2.01 m (6 ft 7 in) | 33 – 19 July 1991 |
| C | 24 | (Tunisia) | Abbassi, Mohamed | 2.02 m (6 ft 8 in) | 34 – 28 March 1991 |
| G/F | 26 | (Tunisia) | Ghyaza, Mokhtar | 2.05 m (6 ft 9 in) | 38 – 15 November 1986 |
| F | 28 | (Tunisia) | Rassil, Mohamed | 2.01 m (6 ft 7 in) | 27 – 3 February 1998 |
| F | 45 | (Tunisia) | Slimane, Radhouane (C) | 2.05 m (6 ft 9 in) | 44 – 16 August 1980 |

Head coach

- (Serbia) Miodrag Perišić

Assistant coach(es)

- (Tunisia) Zied Kechaou

Legend

- (C) Team captain
- (I) Import player
- (E): BAL Elevate player
- (WI): World import
- (AI): African import
- Injured

- Roster
Updated: March 5, 2022

== Competitions ==
=== Overview ===
| Competition | First match | Last match | Starting round | Final position | Record | | | | | | | |
| Competition | First match | Last match | Starting round | Final position | Pld | W | D | L | PF | PA | PD | Win % |
|---|---|---|---|---|---|---|---|---|---|---|---|---|
| Championnat Pro A | 25 September 2021 | 10 May 2022 | Round 1 | Winners | 0 | 0 | 0 | 0 | 0 | 0 | +0 | — |
| Tunisian Cup | In Progress | In Progress | To be confirmed | Winners | 0 | 0 | 0 | 0 | 0 | 0 | +0 | — |
| Basketball Africa League | 6 March 2022 | 28 May 2022 | To be confirmed | Winners | 0 | 0 | 0 | 0 | 0 | 0 | +0 | — |
| Total | | | | | 0 | 0 | 0 | 0 | 0 | 0 | +0 | — |

Last updated: October 8, 2023
Source: Competitions

=== Championnat Pro A ===
The regular season started on 25 September 2021. The six highest placed teams advance to the play-offs, while the bottom four teams will play in the play-out.

==== Regular season table ====
| Pos | Team | Pld | W | L | Qualification or relegation |
|---|---|---|---|---|---|
| 1 | Ezzahra Sports | 18 | 15 | 3 | Qualification to play-offs |
| 2 | US Monastir | 18 | 13 | 5 | Qualification to play-offs |
| 3 | Club Africain | 18 | 13 | 5 | Qualification to play-offs |
| 4 | Étoile Sportive de Radès | 18 | 11 | 7 | Qualification to play-offs |
| 5 | JS Kairouan | 18 | 10 | 8 | Qualification to play-offs |
| 6 | Stade Nabeulien | 18 | 8 | 10 | Qualification to play-offs |
| 7 | Dalia Sportive de Grombalia | 18 | 8 | 10 | Qualification to relegation round |
| 8 | JS Manazeh | 18 | 7 | 11 | Qualification to relegation round |
| 9 | US Ansar | 18 | 5 | 13 | Qualification to relegation round |
| 10 | SS Sfaxien | 18 | 0 | 18 | Qualification to relegation round |

Source: FTBB

==== Results summary ====
| Overall | | | | | | Home | | | | | Away | | | | |
| Pld | W | L | PF | PA | PD | W | L | PF | PA | PD | W | L | PF | PA | PD |
|---|---|---|---|---|---|---|---|---|---|---|---|---|---|---|---|
| 0 | 0 | 0 | 0 | 0 | 0 | 0 | 0 | 0 | 0 | 0 | 0 | 0 | 0 | 0 | 0 |

Last updated: 8 October 2023.
Source: Competitive matches

==== Play-offs table ====
| Pos | Team | Pld | W | L | Qualification or relegation |
|---|---|---|---|---|---|
| 1 | US Monastir | 10 | 8 | 2 | Advance to Super play-offs |
| 2 | Ezzahra Sports | 10 | 8 | 2 | Advance to Super play-offs |
| 3 | ES Radès | 10 | 6 | 4 | Advance to Super play-offs |
| 4 | Stade Nabeulien | 10 | 5 | 5 | Advance to Super play-offs |
| 5 | Club Africain | 10 | 3 | 7 | Qualification to play-out |
| 6 | JS Kairouan | 10 | 3 | 7 | Qualification to play-out |

Source: FTBB

==== Results summary ====
| Overall | | | | | | Home | | | | | Away | | | | |
| Pld | W | L | PF | PA | PD | W | L | PF | PA | PD | W | L | PF | PA | PD |
|---|---|---|---|---|---|---|---|---|---|---|---|---|---|---|---|
| 0 | 0 | 0 | 0 | 0 | 0 | 0 | 0 | 0 | 0 | 0 | 0 | 0 | 0 | 0 | 0 |

Last updated: 8 October 2023.
Source: Competitive matches

=== Basketball Africa League ===
==== BAL Sahara Conference ====
| Pos | Team | Pld | W | L | PF | PA | PD | PCT | Qualification |
|---|---|---|---|---|---|---|---|---|---|
| 1 | (Rwanda) REG | 5 | 4 | 1 | 431 | 423 | +8 | .800 (Note: Head-to-head: REG 77–74 US Monastir on 14 March 2022.) | Advance to playoffs |
| 2 | (Tunisia) US Monastir | 5 | 4 | 1 | 397 | 355 | +42 | .800 | Advance to playoffs |
| 3 | (Morocco) AS Salé | 5 | 3 | 2 | 454 | 438 | +16 | .600 | Advance to playoffs |
| 4 | (Guinea) SLAC | 5 | 2 | 3 | 392 | 394 | −2 | .400 | Advance to playoffs |
| 5 | (Mozambique) Ferroviário da Beira | 5 | 1 | 4 | 416 | 448 | −32 | .200 (Note: Head-to-head: Ferroviário da Beira 98–92 DUC on 8 March 2022.) | |
| 6 | (Senegal) DUC (H) | 5 | 1 | 4 | 402 | 434 | −32 | .200 | |

Source: BAL, Afrobasket
(H) Hosts
Notes:

| 6 March 2022 1 | US Monastir (Tunisia) | 77–71 | (Mozambique) Ferroviário da Beira | Dakar |
| 17:30 | Scoring by quarter: 19-17, 16-23, 19-23, 23-18 |
| | Pts: Ater Majok 19; Rebs: Ater Majok 12; Asts: Radhouane Slimane 5 PIR: Ater Majok 32 | Boxscore | Pts: Perry, Kennedy 17 each Rebs: Prince Orizu 7 Asts: Jermelle Kennedy 5 PIR: Jermelle Kennedy 21 | Arena: Dakar Arena; Attendance: 434 |

| 8 March 2022 2 | SLAC (Guinea) | 55–76 | (Tunisia) US Monastir | Dakar |
| 17:30 | Scoring by quarter: 20–24, 5–20, 15–15, 15–17 |
| | Pts: Chris Crawford 15; Rebs: Chris Obekpa 11; Asts: Dane Miller Jr. 4 PIR: Chris Obekpa 20 | Boxscore | Pts: Radhouane Slimane 15; Rebs: Ater Majok 14; Asts: Lahyani, Slimane 5 each PIR: Ater Majok 22 | Arena: Dakar Arena; Attendance: N/A; Referees: Marcy Williams, Annie Joyce Muchenu, Arnold Moseya |

| 11 March 2022 3 | AS Salé (Morocco) | 90–96 | (Tunisia) US Monastir | Dakar |
| 17:30 | Scoring by quarter: 21–32, 18–20, 20–19, 31–25 |
| | Pts: Terrell Stoglin 41; Rebs: Four players 4 Asts: Terrell Stoglin 7 Eff: Terrell Stoglin 36 | Boxscore | Pts: Radhouane Slimane 24; Rebs: Ater Majok 12; Asts: Michael Dixon 11; Eff: Radhouane Slimane 27 | Arena: Dakar Arena; Attendance: 340; Referees: Kenny Jones, Aboollo Amr, Claudio Eviba |

| 12 March 2022 4 | US Monastir (Tunisia) | 74–62 | (Senegal) DUC | Dakar |
| 17:30 | Scoring by quarter: 20-20, 15-11, 19-17, 20-14 |
| | Pts: Ater Majok 20; Rebs: Ater Majok 13; Asts: Radhouane Slimane 8 PIR: Ater Majok 30 | Boxscore | Pts: Bamba Diallo 19; Rebs: Abel Diop 9 Asts: Hameed Ali 7 PIR: Bamba Diallo 15 | Arena: Dakar Arena; Attendance: 2,000; Referees: Stephanie Barksdale, Wael Ibrahim Mostafa, Euiba Claudio |

| 14 March 2022 5 | REG (Rwanda) | 77–74 | (Tunisia) US Monastir | Dakar |
| 17:30 | Scoring by quarter: 21–26, 15–16, 20–13, 21–19 |
| | Pts: Pitchou Kambuy Manga 16; Rebs: Pitchou Kambuy Manga 10; Asts: Adonis Filer 9 PIR: Pitchou Kambuy Manga 23 | Boxscore | Pts: Michael Dixon 23; Rebs: Ater Majok 14; Asts: Oussama Marnaoui 6 PIR: Ater Majok 23 | Arena: Dakar Arena; Attendance: 400; Referees: Marcy Williams, Aboolo Amr, Arnold Moseya |

==== Playoffs ====
The two teams have never faced each other before. Monastir defeated Cape Town comfortably, never trailing in the game. With a margin of 39 points, it was the largest win in the BAL season.

| 22 May 2022 Quarterfinals | US Monastir (Tunisia) | 106–67 | (South Africa) Cape Town Tigers | Kigali |
| 13:30 | Scoring by quarter: 22–18, 22–15, 27–26, 35–8 |
| | Pts: Dixon 23; Rebs: Majok 9 Asts: Five players 5 PIR: Dixon 24 | Boxscore | Pts: Early 15; Rebs: Prinsloo 8 Asts: Kabongo 5 PIR: Prinsloo 18 | Arena: Kigali Arena; Attendance: 718; Referees: Hortensia Sanchez-Carrizales, Wael Ibrahim Mostafa, Mahamadou Diallo |

| 25 May 2022 Semifinals | US Monastir (Tunisia) | 88–81 | (Egypt) Zamalek | Kigali |
| 21:30 | Scoring by quarter: 16–22, 19–18, 29–18, 24–23 |
| | Pts: Slimane 21; Rebs: Majok 9 Asts: Dixon, Coles Jr. 4 PIR: Dixon 20 | | Pts: McKinney 26; Rebs: Diogu, Mahmoud 9 Asts: Strawberry 5 PIR: McKinney 25 | Arena: BK Arena; Referees: JD Ralls, Antonio Bernardo, Yann Vezo Davidson |

==== Final ====
| 28 May 2022 | Petro de Luanda (Angola) | 72–83 | (Tunisia) US Monastir | Kigali |
| 18:00 CAT | Scoring by quarter: 17–18, 23–15, 19–24, 13–26 |
| | Pts: Gonçalves 28; Rebs: Moreira 7 Asts: Gonçalves 4 PIR: Gonçalves 27 | Boxscore | Pts: Dixon, Lahyani 21; Rebs: Lahyani 10; Asts: Dixon 6 PIR: Lahyani 24 | Arena: BK Arena; Attendance: 10,000; Referees: Hortensia Sanchez-Carrizales, Wael Ibrahim Mostafa, Marie Leslie Cherubin |

== Player statistics ==
Legend
| GP | Games played | GS | Games started | MPG | Minutes per game |
| FG% | Field-goal percentage | 3P% | 3-point field-goal percentage | FT% | Free-throw percentage |
| RPG | Rebounds per game | APG | Assists per game | SPG | Steals per game |
| BPG | Blocks per game | PPG | Points per game |

=== BAL ===
US Monastir statistics
| Player | GP | MPG | FG% | 3FG% | FT% | RPG | APG | SPG | BPG | PPG |
|---|---|---|---|---|---|---|---|---|---|---|
| Radhouane Slimane | 8 | 31.0 | .419 | .294 | .903 | 5.0 | 3.8 | 1.3 | 0.5 | 14.4 |
| Mohamed Rassil | 3 | 5.4 | .000 | .000 | .000 | 2.3 | 0.7 | 0.0 | 0.3 | 0.0 |
| Charles Onana Awana | 3 | 4.4 | .500 | .667 | .000 | 1.0 | 0.0 | 0.3 | 0.0 | 2.0 |
| Wassef Methnani | 3 | 1.8 | .000 | .000 | .500 | 0.3 | 0.0 | 0.3 | 0.0 | 0.3 |
| Oussama Marnaoui | 7 | 19.5 | .277 | .300 | .917 | 2.1 | 1.7 | 1.0 | 0.0 | 6.6 |
| Ater Majok | 8 | 31.4 | .648 | .333 | .577 | 10.9 | 2.0 | 0.3 | 2.5 | 13.6 |
| Houssem Mahemli | 8 | 10.1 | .500 | .250 | 1.000 | 1.0 | 1.3 | 0.1 | 0.1 | 1.4 |
| Firas Lahyani | 8 | 24.8 | .607 | .308 | .667 | 6.1 | 2.8 | 0.4 | 0.5 | 12.3 |
| Neji Jaziri | 4 | 6.8 | .385 | .364 | 1.000 | 1.3 | 0.8 | 0.8 | 0.0 | 3.8 |
| Mokhtar Ghayaza | 8 | 16.8 | .656 | .000 | .714 | 5.1 | 0.9 | 1.1 | 0.3 | 6.5 |
| Michael Dixon | 8 | 29.8 | .539 | .474 | .818 | 2.0 | 3.9 | 0.4 | 0.1 | 16.5 |
| Solo Diabate | 6 | 24.7 | .358 | .211 | .889 | 2.7 | 3.8 | 1.2 | 0.0 | 8.3 |
| Julius Coles Jr.^{≠} | 3 | 28.5 | .294 | .158 | .667 | 2.7 | 4.3 | 2.0 | 0.0 | 10.3 |
| Mohamed Abbassi | 3 | 5.4 | .800 | .000 | .000 | 0.7 | 0.3 | 0.3 | 0.0 | 2.7 |

^{≠}Acquired during the season
^{~}Waived during the season
