= 2021–22 Championnat Pro A =

2021–22 Championnat National A
- Season: 2021–22
- Dates: 25 September 2021 – 10 May 2022
- Teams: 10
- TV partner: El Watania 2

Regular season
- Relegated: SS Sfaxien

Finals
- Champions: US Monastir (7th title)
- Runners-up: Ezzahra Sports
- Third place: Stade Nabeulien

Records
- Biggest home win: 51 points US Monastir 109-58 SS Sfaxien (12 December 2021)
- Biggest away win: 52 points SS Sfaxien 50-102 ES Radès (10 November 2021)

The 2021–22 Championnat National A is the 67th season of the Championnat National A, the highest basketball league in Tunisia. The regular season started on 25 September 2021 and ended on 10 May 2022.

US Monastir won its seventh league title; it was its fourth straight victorious season.

== Teams ==
This season featured 10 teams, with SS Sfaxien and US Ansar joining the league as newcomers.

Club	City	Arena	Capacity
Club Africain	Tunis	Salle Chérif-Bellaminej	2,500
Dalia Sport Grombalia	Grombalia	Salle Couverte de Grombalia	1,200
ES Radès	Radès	Salle Couverte Taoufik-Bouhima	3,500
JS Kairouan	Kairouan	Salle Kairouan	2,000
JS Menzah	Tunis (El Menzah)	Palais des Sports d'El Menzah	4,500
SS Sfaxien	Sfax	Salle Mohamed-Ali-Akid	4,000
Stade Nabeulien	Nabeul	Salle Bir Challouf	5,000
US Ansar	Dar Chaabane	Salle de dar Chaâbane	1,000
US Monastir	Monastir	Mohamed-Mzali Sports Hall	4,075
Ezzahra Sports	Ezzahra	Ezzahra Arena	2,000

== Foreign players ==
The following foreign players played with the Championnat National A teams this season:

Club	Player 1	Player 2	Player 3
Club Africain
Dalia Sport Grombalia	(United States) Mike McGall		
ES Radès
JS Kairouan	(United States) Kendall Gray		
JS Menzah	(United States) Brachon Griffin	(United States) Shawn Foxbrennen	
SS Sfaxien			
Stade Nabeulien			
US Ansar	(Nigeria) Prinze Orizu		
US Monastir	(United States) Ty Lawson		
Ezzahra Sports	(United States) Walt Lemon Jr.	(Bahrain) C. J. Giles	(Sudan) Ater Majok

== Regular season ==
The regular season started on 25 September 2021. The six highest placed teams advance to the play-offs, while the bottom four teams will play in the play-out.

Pos	Team	Pld	W	L	Qualification or relegation
1	Ezzahra Sports	18	15	3	Qualification to play-offs
2	US Monastir	18	13	5	Qualification to play-offs
3	Club Africain	18	13	5	Qualification to play-offs
4	Étoile Sportive de Radès	18	11	7	Qualification to play-offs
5	JS Kairouan	18	10	8	Qualification to play-offs
6	Stade Nabeulien	18	8	10	Qualification to play-offs
7	Dalia Sportive de Grombalia	18	8	10	Qualification to relegation round
8	JS Manazeh	18	7	11	Qualification to relegation round
9	US Ansar	18	5	13	Qualification to relegation round
10	SS Sfaxien	18	0	18	Qualification to relegation round

Source: FTBB

== Relegation round ==
Pos	Team	Pld	W	L	Qualification or relegation
1	JS Manazeh	6	6	0	Advance to play-out
2	Dalia Sportive de Grombalia	6	3	3	Advance to play-out
3	US Ansar	5	2	3	Advance to play-out
4	SS Sfaxien (R)	5	0	5	Relegated

Source: FTBB
(R) Relegated

== Play-offs ==
In the play-offs, the six highest ranked team from the regular season play against each other. The highest four teams advance to the Super play-offs.

Pos	Team	Pld	W	L	Qualification or relegation
1	US Monastir	10	8	2	Advance to Super play-offs
2	Ezzahra Sports	10	8	2	Advance to Super play-offs
3	ES Radès	10	6	4	Advance to Super play-offs
4	Stade Nabeulien	10	5	5	Advance to Super play-offs
5	Club Africain	10	3	7	Qualification to play-out
6	JS Kairouan	10	3	7	Qualification to play-out

Source: FTBB

== Super play-offs ==
The Super play-offs began on 14 April 2022. Numbers in brackets denote the team's seed.

Semi-finals
US Monastir (1)	89	80	82
Stade Nabeulien (4)	84	62	79
Ezzahra Sports (2)	78	74	65	69	82
ES Radès (3)	74	57	68	79	74

Final
US Monastir (1)	75	71	72	79
Ezzahra Sports (2)	71	67	74	63
Third place
ES Radès (3)	79	83	74	73
Stade Nabeulien (4)	75	94	92	79

== Play-out ==
The last team in the play-out is relegated directly to the Nationale B. The three other teams play in the Super play-out.

== Winning roster ==
- US Monastir 2021–22 roster
  - Coach : Miodrag Perišić
  - Players : Neji Jaziri, Oussama Marnaoui, Radhouane Slimane, Mohamed Rassil, Firas Lahyani, Mohamed Abbassi, Wassef Methnani, Mokhtar Ghyaza, Michael Dixon, Solo Diabate, Houssem Mhamli
