= 2024 FIBA Men's Olympic Qualifying Tournaments squads =

Team players of the 2024 FIBA Men's Olympic Qualifying Tournaments

The 2024 FIBA Men's Olympic Qualifying Tournaments includes teams whose rosters consists of 12 players; a team may opt to have one naturalized player as per FIBA eligibility rules in their roster.

Player ages are as of 2 July 2024, the first day of the tournament.

== OQT Valencia, Spain ==
=== Spain ===
Spain men's national basketball team roster
Players
Coaches

| Pos. | No. | Name | Age – Date of birth | Height | Club | Ctr. |
|---|---|---|---|---|---|---|
| PG | 2 | Lorenzo Brown | 33 – 26 August 1990 | 1.96 m (6 ft 5 in) | Panathinaikos B.C. | (Greece) |
| C | 4 | Jaime Pradilla | 23 – 3 January 2001 | 2.05 m (6 ft 9 in) | Valencia | (Spain) |
| SF | 5 | Rudy Fernández | 39 – 4 April 1985 | 1.96 m (6 ft 5 in) | Real Madrid | (Spain) |
| SF | 6 | Xabier López-Arostegui | 27 – 19 May 1997 | 2.01 m (6 ft 7 in) | Valencia | (Spain) |
| F | 7 | Santi Aldama | 23 – 10 January 2001 | 2.11 m (6 ft 11 in) | Memphis Grizzlies | (United States) |
| SG | 8 | Darío Brizuela | 29 – 8 November 1994 | 1.88 m (6 ft 2 in) | Barcelona | (Spain) |
| PG | 9 | Alberto Díaz | 30 – 23 April 1994 | 1.90 m (6 ft 3 in) | Unicaja Málaga | (Spain) |
| F | 10 | Juancho Hernangómez | 28 – 28 September 1995 | 2.06 m (6 ft 9 in) | Panathinaikos | (Greece) |
| C | 14 | Willy Hernangómez | 30 – 27 May 1994 | 2.11 m (6 ft 11 in) | Barcelona | (Spain) |
| F | 16 | Usman Garuba | 22 – 9 March 2002 | 2.03 m (6 ft 8 in) | Golden State Warriors | (United States) |
| G | 23 | Sergio Llull | 36 – 15 November 1987 | 1.90 m (6 ft 3 in) | Real Madrid | (Spain) |
| PG | 24 | Juan Núñez | 20 – 4 June 2004 | 1.91 m (6 ft 3 in) | Ratiopharm Ulm | (Germany) |

Head coach

- (Italy) Sergio Scariolo

Assistant coach(es)

- (Spain) Luis Guil
- (Spain) Angel Sanchez-Cañete

Legend

- Club – describes last
  club before the competition
- Age – describes age
  on 2 July 2024

=== Angola ===
Angola men's national basketball team roster
Players
Coaches

| Pos. | No. | Name | Age – Date of birth | Height | Club | Ctr. |
|---|---|---|---|---|---|---|
| F | 0 | Eduardo Francisco | 19 – 5 November 2003 | 2.00 m (6 ft 7 in) | Benfica | (Portugal) |
| G | 1 | Aginaldo Neto | 17 – 29 April 2006 | 1.87 m (6 ft 2 in) | Petro de Luanda | (Angola) |
| G | 3 | Gerson Gonçalves | 27 – 29 March 1996 | 1.93 m (6 ft 4 in) | Petro de Luanda | (Angola) |
| PG | 5 | Childe Dundão | 25 – 17 May 1998 | 1.67 m (5 ft 6 in) | Petro de Luanda | (Angola) |
| C | 8 | Jilson Bango | 24 – 6 January 1999 | 2.08 m (6 ft 10 in) | Zaragoza | (Spain) |
| G | 9 | Selton Miguel | 22 – 24 October 2000 | 1.94 m (6 ft 4 in) | Maryland Terrapins | (United States) |
| C | 13 | João Fernandes | 30 – 1 December 1992 | 2.00 m (6 ft 7 in) | Oliveirense | (Portugal) |
| PF | 15 | Abou Gakou | 26 – 27 May 1997 | 2.01 m (6 ft 7 in) | Petro de Luanda | (Angola) |
| C | 20 | Bruno Fernando | 25 – 15 August 1998 | 2.06 m (6 ft 9 in) | Atlanta Hawks | (United States) |
| PF | 22 | Silvio De Sousa | 24 – 7 October 1998 | 2.06 m (6 ft 9 in) | Aris | (Greece) |
| C | 66 | Braz Macachi | 21 – 5 September 2001 | 2.02 m (6 ft 8 in) | 1° de Agosto | (Angola) |
| PG | 88 | Luis Pereira | 22 – 8 September 2000 | 1.91 m (6 ft 3 in) | Vitória S.C. | (Portugal) |

Head coach

- (Spain) Josep Clarós

Assistant coach(es)

- (Angola) Miguel Lutonda
- (Angola) Aníbal Moreira

Legend

- (C) Team captain
- Club – describes last
  club before the tournament
- Age – describes age
  on 2 July 2024

=== Bahamas ===
Bahamas men's national basketball team roster
Players
Coaches

| Pos. | No. | Name | Age – Date of birth | Height | Club | Ctr. |
|---|---|---|---|---|---|---|
| C | 1 | Deandre Ayton | 25 – 23 July 1998 | 2.13 m (7 ft 0 in) | Portland Trail Blazers | (United States) |
| G | 3 | Franco Miller Jr. | 24 – 2 September 1999 | 1.88 m (6 ft 2 in) | Florida Gulf Coast | (United States) |
| F | 6 | Travis Munnings | 29 – 14 September 1994 | 1.98 m (6 ft 6 in) | Élan Béarnais | (France) |
| SG | 7 | Buddy Hield | 31 – 17 December 1992 | 1.93 m (6 ft 4 in) | Philadelphia 76ers | (United States) |
| G | 8 | V. J. Edgecombe | 18 – 30 July 2005 | 1.98 m (6 ft 6 in) | Baylor | (United States) |
| F | 9 | Donavan Freeman | 18 – 14 August 2005 | 2.10 m (6 ft 11 in) | Syracuse | (United States) |
| SG | 10 | Eric Gordon | 35 – 25 December 1988 | 1.93 m (6 ft 4 in) | Phoenix Suns | (United States) |
| PG | 11 | Lourawls Nairn Jr. | 29 – 17 December 1994 | 1.78 m (5 ft 10 in) | Free agent |
| F | 12 | Kentwan Smith | 32 – 17 December 1991 | 2.04 m (6 ft 8 in) | BC Luleå | (Sweden) |
| PG | 13 | Deyton Albury | 22 – 11 April 2002 | 1.88 m (6 ft 2 in) | Utah State | (United States) |
| PF | 14 | Sammy Hunter | 23 – 28 November 2000 | 2.05 m (6 ft 9 in) | Akron | (United States) |
| C | 15 | Jaraun Burrows | 38 – 4 September 1985 | 2.03 m (6 ft 8 in) | Andrézieux-Bouthéon | (France) |

Head coach

- (United States) Chris DeMarco

Assistant coach(es)

- (The Bahamas) Mikhail McLean
- (The Bahamas) Moses Johnson

Legend

- Club – describes last
  club before the tournament
- Age – describes age
  on 2 July 2024

=== Finland ===
Finland men's national basketball team roster
Players
Coaches

| Pos. | No. | Name | Age – Date of birth | Height | Club | Ctr. |
|---|---|---|---|---|---|---|
| G | 1 | Miro Little | 20 – 30 May 2004 | 1.93 m (6 ft 4 in) | Utah | (United States) |
| SG | 9 | Sasu Salin (C) | 33 – 11 June 1991 | 1.91 m (6 ft 3 in) | Tenerife | (Spain) |
| PF | 13 | Olivier Nkamhoua | 24 – 2 May 2000 | 2.03 m (6 ft 8 in) | Niners Chemnitz | (Germany) |
| F/C | 18 | Mikael Jantunen | 24 – 20 April 2000 | 2.04 m (6 ft 8 in) | Paris | (France) |
| SF | 19 | Elias Valtonen | 25 – 11 June 1999 | 2.04 m (6 ft 8 in) | Granada | (Spain) |
| C | 20 | Alexander Madsen | 29 – 26 January 1995 | 2.08 m (6 ft 10 in) | Andorra | (Spain) |
| PG | 21 | Edon Maxhuni | 26 – 21 March 1998 | 1.88 m (6 ft 2 in) | Le Portel | (France) |
| F | 24 | Miikka Muurinen | 17 – 4 March 2007 | 2.08 m (6 ft 10 in) | Arizona Compass Prep | (United States) |
| G | 30 | Andre Gustavson | 25 – 7 May 1999 | 1.92 m (6 ft 4 in) | Karhu | (Finland) |
| SG | 34 | Jacob Grandison | 26 – 2 April 1998 | 1.98 m (6 ft 6 in) | Salon Vilpas | (Finland) |
| F | 44 | Remu Raitanen | 26 – 21 August 1997 | 2.06 m (6 ft 9 in) | Cáceres | (Spain) |
| PG | 51 | Severi Kaukiainen | 26 – 11 May 1998 | 1.85 m (6 ft 1 in) | Kalev/Cramo | (Estonia) |

Head coach

- (Finland) Lassi Tuovi

Assistant coach(es)

- (Finland) Hanno Möttölä
- (Finland) Daniel Jansson
- (Finland) Teemu Rannikko

Legend

- (C) Team captain
- Club – describes last
  club before the competition
- Age – describes age
  on 1 July 2024

=== Lebanon ===
Lebanon men's national basketball team roster
Players
Coaches

| Pos. | No. | Name | Age – Date of birth | Height | Club | Ctr. |
|---|---|---|---|---|---|---|
| PF | 4 | Omari Spellman | 26 – 21 July 1997 | 2.05 m (6 ft 9 in) | Anyang KGC | (South Korea) |
| SG | 5 | Amir Saoud | 33 – 18 January 1991 | 1.87 m (6 ft 2 in) | Al Riyadi | (Lebanon) |
| SG | 7 | Karim Zeinoun | 25 – 16 June 1999 | 1.88 m (6 ft 2 in) | Al Riyadi | (Lebanon) |
| PG | 8 | Jad Khalil | 27 – 20 November 1996 | 1.85 m (6 ft 1 in) | Sagesse SC | (Lebanon) |
| SG | 9 | Sergio El Darwich | 27 – 25 July 1996 | 1.94 m (6 ft 4 in) | Beirut Club | (Lebanon) |
| PG | 10 | Ali Mansour | 26 – 1 January 1998 | 1.85 m (6 ft 1 in) | Al Riyadi | (Lebanon) |
| PF | 11 | Ali Haidar | 33 – 20 July 1990 | 2.03 m (6 ft 8 in) | Beirut Club | (Lebanon) |
| C | 14 | Karim Raphael Ezzedine | 26 – 8 August 1997 | 2.06 m (6 ft 9 in) | Sagesse SC | (Lebanon) |
| F | 23 | Youssef Khayat | 21 – 11 March 2003 | 2.05 m (6 ft 9 in) | Bowling Green | (United States) |
| PF | 24 | Hayk Gyokchyan | 34 – 11 December 1989 | 2.03 m (6 ft 8 in) | Al Riyadi | (Lebanon) |
| PG | 25 | Ali Mezher | 30 – 22 March 1994 | 1.82 m (6 ft 0 in) | Beirut Club | (Lebanon) |
| C | 34 | Gerard Hadidian | 29 – 21 April 1995 | 2.02 m (6 ft 8 in) | Sagesse SC | (Lebanon) |

Head coach

- (Serbia) Miodrag Perišić

Assistant coach(es)

- (Serbia) Marko Filipović
- (Lebanon) Ralph Akl

Legend

- Club – describes last
  club before the tournament
- Age – describes age
  on 2 July 2024

=== Poland ===
Poland men's national basketball team roster
Players
Coaches

| Pos. | No. | Name | Age – Date of birth | Height | Club | Ctr. |
|---|---|---|---|---|---|---|
| SF | 0 | Andrzej Pluta | 24 – 3 June 2000 | 1.98 m (6 ft 6 in) | Arka Gdynia | (Poland) |
| PF | 1 | Jeremy Sochan | 21 – 20 May 2003 | 2.03 m (6 ft 8 in) | San Antonio Spurs | (United States) |
| C | 2 | Aleksander Balcerowski | 23 – 19 November 2000 | 2.16 m (7 ft 1 in) | Panathinaikos | (Greece) |
| SF | 3 | Michał Sokołowski | 31 – 11 December 1992 | 1.96 m (6 ft 5 in) | Napoli | (Italy) |
| PG | 4 | A.J. Slaughter | 36 – 3 August 1987 | 1.91 m (6 ft 3 in) | Gran Canaria | (Spain) |
| SF | 7 | Igor Miličić Jr. | 21 – 27 August 2002 | 2.02 m (6 ft 8 in) | UNC Charlotte | (United States) |
| PG | 8 | Andrzej Mazurczak | 30 – 27 December 1993 | 1.88 m (6 ft 2 in) | King Szczecin | (Poland) |
| SF | 9 | Mateusz Ponitka | 30 – 29 August 1993 | 1.98 m (6 ft 6 in) | Partizan | (Serbia) |
| C | 11 | Aleksander Dziewa | 26 – 6 November 1997 | 2.06 m (6 ft 9 in) | Hamburg | (Germany) |
| PF | 15 | Jarosław Zyskowski | 31 – 16 July 1992 | 2.03 m (6 ft 8 in) | Trefl Sopot | (Poland) |
| SG | 23 | Michał Michalak | 30 – 2 November 1993 | 1.97 m (6 ft 6 in) | PAOK | (Greece) |
| SG | 28 | Przemysław Żołnierewicz | 28 – 3 July 1995 | 1.96 m (6 ft 5 in) | King Szczecin | (Poland) |

Head coach

- (Croatia) Igor Miličić

Assistant coach(es)

- (Poland) Artur Gronek
- (Poland) Grzegorz Kożan

Legend

- Club – describes last
  club before the competition
- Age – describes age
  on 2 July 2024

== OQT Riga, Latvia ==
=== Latvia ===
Latvia men's national basketball team roster
Players
Coaches

| Pos. | No. | Name | Age – Date of birth | Height | Club | Ctr. |
|---|---|---|---|---|---|---|
| F | 00 | Rodions Kurucs | 26 – 5 February 1998 | 2.03 m (6 ft 8 in) | Murcia | (Spain) |
| F | 5 | Mareks Mejeris | 32 – 2 September 1991 | 2.07 m (6 ft 9 in) | Cluj Napoca | (Romania) |
| F | 8 | Dāvis Bertāns | 31 – 12 November 1992 | 2.08 m (6 ft 10 in) | Charlotte Hornets | (United States) |
| G | 9 | Dairis Bertāns | 34 – 9 September 1989 | 1.93 m (6 ft 4 in) | VEF Riga | (Latvia) |
| F | 10 | Jānis Timma | 32 – 2 July 1992 | 2.03 m (6 ft 8 in) | Obradoiro | (Spain) |
| F | 11 | Rolands Šmits | 28 – 25 June 1995 | 2.07 m (6 ft 9 in) | Anadolu Efes | (Turkey) |
| F | 12 | Artūrs Strautiņš | 25 – 23 October 1998 | 1.98 m (6 ft 6 in) | Derthona | (Italy) |
| G | 13 | Jānis Strēlnieks | 34 – 1 September 1989 | 1.90 m (6 ft 3 in) | Obradoiro | (Spain) |
| C | 18 | Klāvs Čavars | 28 – 11 February 1996 | 2.08 m (6 ft 10 in) | Sabah | (Azerbaijan) |
| G | 19 | Rihards Lomažs | 28 – 13 April 1996 | 1.93 m (6 ft 4 in) | Segafredo Virtus Bologna | (Italy) |
| G | 55 | Artūrs Žagars | 24 – 21 April 2000 | 1.90 m (6 ft 3 in) | Fenerbahçe | (Turkey) |
| G | 66 | Kristers Zoriks | 26 – 25 May 1998 | 1.93 m (6 ft 4 in) | Petkim Spor | (Turkey) |

Head coach

- (Italy) Luca Banchi

Assistant coach(es)

- (Latvia) Jānis Gailītis
- (Latvia) Artūrs Visockis-Rubenis

Legend

- Club – describes last
  club before the competition
- Age – describes age
  on 2 July 2024

=== Brazil ===
Brazil men's national basketball team roster
Players
Coaches

| Pos. | No. | Name | Age – Date of birth | Height | Club | Ctr. |
|---|---|---|---|---|---|---|
| PG | 2 | Yago dos Santos | 25 – 9 March 1999 | 1.78 m (5 ft 10 in) | Crvena Zvezda | (Serbia) |
| C | 6 | Cristiano Felicio | 31 – 7 July 1992 | 2.08 m (6 ft 10 in) | Granada | (Spain) |
| SG | 7 | Didi Louzada | 25 – 2 July 1999 | 1.96 m (6 ft 5 in) | Flamengo | (Brazil) |
| SG | 8 | Vitor Benite | 34 – 20 February 1990 | 1.94 m (6 ft 4 in) | Palencia | (Spain) |
| PG | 9 | Marcelinho Huertas | 41 – 25 May 1983 | 1.91 m (6 ft 3 in) | Tenerife | (Spain) |
| SG | 11 | Gui Santos | 22 – 22 June 2002 | 1.97 m (6 ft 6 in) | Golden State Warriors | (United States) |
| SF | 14 | Leo Meindl | 31 – 20 March 1993 | 2.01 m (6 ft 7 in) | Alvark Tokyo | (Japan) |
| PG | 23 | Raul Neto | 32 – 19 May 1992 | 1.85 m (6 ft 1 in) | Fenerbahçe S.K. | (Turkey) |
| G | 32 | Georginho de Paula | 28 – 24 May 1996 | 1.97 m (6 ft 6 in) | Franca | (Brazil) |
| F | 45 | Mãozinha Pereira | 23 – 28 August 2000 | 1.98 m (6 ft 6 in) | Memphis Grizzlies | (United States) |
| PF | 51 | Bruno Caboclo | 28 – 21 September 1995 | 2.06 m (6 ft 9 in) | Partizan | (Serbia) |
| PF | 99 | Lucas Dias | 28 – 6 July 1995 | 2.08 m (6 ft 10 in) | Franca | (Brazil) |

Head coach

- (Croatia) Aleksandar Petrović

Assistant coach(es)

- (Brazil) Tiago Splitter
- (Brazil) Helio Rubens
- (Brazil) Bruno Savignani

Legend

- (C) Team captain
- Club – describes last
  club before the competition
- Age – describes age
  on 2 July 2024

=== Cameroon ===
Cameroon men's national basketball team roster
Players
Coaches

| Pos. | No. | Name | Age – Date of birth | Height | Club | Ctr. |
|---|---|---|---|---|---|---|
| PF | 00 | Paul Eboua | 24 – 14 February 2000 | 2.03 m (6 ft 8 in) | Vanoli Cremona | (Italy) |
| F | 7 | Tamenang Choh | 25 – 16 July 1998 | 1.98 m (6 ft 6 in) | Antibes Sharks | (France) |
| PG | 8 | Samir Gbetkom | 26 – 23 March 1998 | 1.91 m (6 ft 3 in) | Antibes Sharks | (France) |
| F | 11 | Brice Eyaga | 25 – 25 November 1998 | 2.05 m (6 ft 9 in) | JA Vichy Basket | (France) |
| SF | 15 | Arnold Kome | 31 – 10 September 1992 | 1.95 m (6 ft 5 in) | FAP Yaoundé | (Cameroon) |
| SG | 23 | Fabien Ateba | 33 – 29 May 1991 | 1.95 m (6 ft 5 in) | Union Tarbes-Lourdes | (France) |
| F | 24 | Roland Nyama | 30 – 10 July 1993 | 1.98 m (6 ft 6 in) | Giessen 46ers | (Germany) |
| F | 25 | Roger Moute a Bidias | 29 – 21 April 1995 | 1.99 m (6 ft 6 in) | Saint-Chamond Basket | (France) |
| F | 26 | Jordan Bayehe | 24 – 15 October 1999 | 2.06 m (6 ft 9 in) | Dolomiti Energia Trento | (Italy) |
| F | 30 | Abdourachid Tsimbila | 24 – 14 June 2000 | 2.06 m (6 ft 9 in) | Fordham | (United States) |
| C | 44 | Williams Narace | 27 – 16 March 1997 | 2.03 m (6 ft 8 in) | Le Mans Sarthe | (France) |
| SG | 68 | Jeremiah Hill | 28 – 3 September 1995 | 1.88 m (6 ft 2 in) | Ironi Ness Ziona | (Israel) |

Head coach

- (Cameroon) Alfred Aboya

Assistant coach(es)

- (Serbia) Slavoljub Gorunovic
- (Spain) Mikel Ereño Martin

Legend

- (C) Team captain
- Club – describes last
  club before the competition
- Age – describes age
  on 2 July 2024

=== Georgia ===
Georgia men's national basketball team roster
Players
Coaches

| Pos. | No. | Name | Age – Date of birth | Height | Club | Ctr. |
|---|---|---|---|---|---|---|
| PG | 4 | Rati Andronikashvili | 23 – 18 March 2001 | 1.93 m (6 ft 4 in) | Zaragoza | (Spain) |
| F | 5 | Sandro Mamukelashvili | 25 – 22 May 1999 | 2.11 m (6 ft 11 in) | San Antonio Spurs | (United States) |
| SF | 6 | Kakhaber Jintcharadze | 30 – 15 July 1993 | 1.97 m (6 ft 6 in) | Al-Rayyan | (Qatar) |
| SG | 10 | Duda Sanadze | 31 – 24 July 1992 | 1.96 m (6 ft 5 in) | Atomerőmű SE | (Hungary) |
| PF | 12 | George Korsantia | 26 – 10 January 1998 | 2.03 m (6 ft 8 in) | Kutaisi | (Georgia (country)) |
| F | 15 | Aleksandre Phevadze | 26 – 14 April 1998 | 2.02 m (6 ft 8 in) | TSU | (Georgia (country)) |
| PF | 23 | Toko Shengelia | 32 – 4 October 1991 | 2.07 m (6 ft 9 in) | Virtus Bologna | (Italy) |
| PG | 27 | Luka Maziashvili | 23 – 26 October 2000 | 1.90 m (6 ft 3 in) | Kavkasia | (Georgia (country)) |
| G | 32 | Joe Thomasson | 30 – 15 August 1993 | 1.93 m (6 ft 4 in) | Maccabi Tel Aviv | (Israel) |
| C | 35 | Goga Bitadze | 24 – 19 July 1999 | 2.13 m (7 ft 0 in) | Orlando Magic | (United States) |
| PG | 77 | Giorgi Ochkhikidze | 20 – 4 June 2004 | 1.92 m (6 ft 4 in) | Kutaisi | (Georgia (country)) |
| C | 99 | Ilia Londaridze | 34 – 14 September 1989 | 2.05 m (6 ft 9 in) | Kavkasia | (Georgia (country)) |

Head coach

- (Serbia) Aleksandar Džikić

Assistant coach(es)

- (Georgia (country)) Anatoli Boisa
- (Georgia (country)) Manuchar Markoishvili

Legend

- (C) Team captain
- Club – describes last
  club before the competition
- Age – describes age
  on 2 July 2024

=== Montenegro ===
Montenegro men's national basketball team roster
Players
Coaches

| Pos. | No. | Name | Age – Date of birth | Height | Club | Ctr. |
|---|---|---|---|---|---|---|
| PF | 1 | Vasilije Baćović | 28 – 10 May 1996 | 2.07 m (6 ft 9 in) | NKA Pécs | (Hungary) |
| PF | 2 | Aleksa Ilić | 27 – 17 September 1996 | 2.04 m (6 ft 8 in) | Budućnost | (Montenegro) |
| C | 3 | Nikola Vučević | 33 – 23 October 1990 | 2.08 m (6 ft 10 in) | Chicago Bulls | (United States) |
| SF | 6 | Emir Hadžibegović | 27 – 23 August 1996 | 2.06 m (6 ft 9 in) | SC Derby | (Montenegro) |
| SG | 7 | Andrija Slavković | 25 – 14 February 1999 | 2.02 m (6 ft 8 in) | Budućnost | (Montenegro) |
| F | 8 | Dino Radončić | 25 – 7 January 1999 | 2.03 m (6 ft 8 in) | Bayern Munich | (Germany) |
| C | 9 | Marko Simonović | 24 – 14 October 1999 | 2.13 m (7 ft 0 in) | Bahçeşehir Koleji | (Turkey) |
| G | 13 | Đorđije Jovanović | 21 – 14 May 2003 | 1.97 m (6 ft 6 in) | Budućnost | (Montenegro) |
| PG | 22 | Igor Drobnjak | 24 – 20 April 2000 | 1.93 m (6 ft 4 in) | SC Derby | (Montenegro) |
| G | 30 | Petar Popović | 27 – 12 September 1996 | 1.93 m (6 ft 4 in) | Budućnost | (Montenegro) |
| PG | 44 | Luka Bogavac | 20 – 19 September 2003 | 1.95 m (6 ft 5 in) | SC Derby | (Montenegro) |
| PG | 55 | Kendrick Perry | 31 – 22 December 1992 | 1.83 m (6 ft 0 in) | Unicaja | (Spain) |

Head coach

- (Montenegro) Boško Radović

Assistant coach(es)

- (Montenegro) Boško Boškovič
- (Montenegro) Vladimir Todorović

Legend

- (C) Team captain
- Club – describes last
  club before the competition
- Age – describes age
  on 2 July 2024

=== Philippines ===
Philippines men's national basketball team roster
Players
Coaches

| Pos. | No. | Name | Age – Date of birth | Height | Club | Ctr. |
|---|---|---|---|---|---|---|
| SG | 3 | Chris Newsome | 33 – 25 July 1990 | 1.88 m (6 ft 2 in) | Meralco Bolts | (Philippines) |
| C | 11 | Kai Sotto | 22 – 11 May 2002 | 2.21 m (7 ft 3 in) | Hiroshima Dragonflies | (Japan) |
| C | 15 | June Mar Fajardo | 34 – 17 November 1989 | 2.08 m (6 ft 10 in) | San Miguel Beermen | (Philippines) |
| G | 17 | CJ Perez | 30 – 17 November 1993 | 1.88 m (6 ft 2 in) | San Miguel Beermen | (Philippines) |
| F | 18 | Calvin Oftana | 28 – 3 January 1996 | 1.96 m (6 ft 5 in) | TNT Tropang Giga | (Philippines) |
| C | 21 | Mason Francis Amos | 19 – 21 August 2004 | 2.01 m (6 ft 7 in) | Ateneo | (Philippines) |
| PG | 24 | Dwight Ramos | 25 – 2 September 1998 | 1.93 m (6 ft 4 in) | Levanga Hokkaido | (Japan) |
| PF | 25 | Japeth Aguilar | 37 – 25 January 1987 | 2.06 m (6 ft 9 in) | Barangay Ginebra San Miguel | (Philippines) |
| F | 28 | Kevin Quiambao | 23 – 22 April 2001 | 1.93 m (6 ft 4 in) | De La Salle | (Philippines) |
| F | 32 | Justin Brownlee | 36 – 23 April 1988 | 2.00 m (6 ft 7 in) | Pelita Jaya | (Indonesia) |
| F | 33 | Carl Tamayo | 23 – 13 February 2001 | 2.03 m (6 ft 8 in) | Changwon LG Sakers | (South Korea) |

Head coach

- (United States) Tim Cone

Assistant coach(es)

- (Philippines) Richard del Rosario
- (Philippines) Jong Uichico

Legend

- Club – describes last
  club before the tournament
- Age – describes age
  on 2 July 2024

== OQT Piraeus, Greece ==
=== Greece ===
Greece men's national basketball team roster
Players
Coaches

| Pos. | No. | Name | Age – Date of birth | Height | Club | Ctr. |
|---|---|---|---|---|---|---|
| PG | 0 | Thomas Walkup | 31 – 30 December 1992 | 1.93 m (6 ft 4 in) | Olympiacos | (Greece) |
| G | 5 | Giannoulis Larentzakis | 30 – 22 September 1993 | 1.96 m (6 ft 5 in) | Olympiacos | (Greece) |
| SG | 6 | Dimitris Moraitis | 25 – 3 February 1999 | 1.94 m (6 ft 4 in) | Panathinaikos | (Greece) |
| G | 7 | Vasileios Toliopoulos | 28 – 15 June 1996 | 1.88 m (6 ft 2 in) | Aris | (Greece) |
| PG | 8 | Nick Calathes | 35 – 7 February 1989 | 1.98 m (6 ft 6 in) | Monaco | (France) |
| SF | 11 | Panagiotis Kalaitzakis | 25 – 2 January 1999 | 2.00 m (6 ft 7 in) | Panathinaikos | (Greece) |
| C | 14 | Georgios Papagiannis | 26 – 3 July 1997 | 2.18 m (7 ft 2 in) | Monaco | (France) |
| F | 15 | Vasilis Charalampopoulos | 27 – 6 January 1997 | 2.03 m (6 ft 8 in) | Türk Telekom | (Turkey) |
| SF | 16 | Kostas Papanikolaou | 33 – 31 July 1990 | 2.03 m (6 ft 8 in) | Olympiacos | (Greece) |
| SF | 34 | Giannis Antetokounmpo | 29 – 6 December 1994 | 2.11 m (6 ft 11 in) | Milwaukee Bucks | (United States) |
| C | 37 | Kostas Antetokounmpo | 26 – 20 November 1997 | 2.08 m (6 ft 10 in) | Panathinaikos | (Greece) |
| PF | 44 | Konstantinos Mitoglou | 28 – 11 June 1996 | 2.10 m (6 ft 11 in) | Panathinaikos | (Greece) |

Head coach

- (Greece) Vasilis Spanoulis

Assistant coach(es)

- (Greece) Ilias Kantzouris
- (Greece) Adamantios Panagiotopoulos

Legend

- Club – describes last club
  before the tournament
- Age – describes age
  on 2 July 2024

=== Croatia ===
Croatia men's national basketball team roster
Players
Coaches

| Pos. | No. | Name | Age – Date of birth | Height | Club | Ctr. |
|---|---|---|---|---|---|---|
| PG | 2 | Goran Filipović | 27 – 26 November 1996 | 1.80 m (5 ft 11 in) | Igokea | (Bosnia and Herzegovina) |
| G | 3 | Jaleen Smith | 29 – 24 November 1994 | 1.93 m (6 ft 4 in) | Partizan | (Serbia) |
| PG | 4 | Borna Kapusta | 27 – 24 July 1996 | 1.83 m (6 ft 0 in) | SC Derby | (Montenegro) |
| SG | 5 | Filip Krušlin | 35 – 18 March 1989 | 1.98 m (6 ft 6 in) | SIG Strasbourg | (France) |
| G/F | 8 | Mario Hezonja | 28 – 25 February 1995 | 2.00 m (6 ft 7 in) | Real Madrid | (Spain) |
| PF | 9 | Dario Šarić (C) | 29 – 8 April 1994 | 2.08 m (6 ft 10 in) | Golden State Warriors | (United States) |
| C | 13 | Ivan Vraneš | 28 – 29 May 1996 | 2.08 m (6 ft 10 in) | Juventus | (Lithuania) |
| C | 22 | Danko Branković | 23 – 5 November 2000 | 2.16 m (7 ft 1 in) | Bayern Munich | (Germany) |
| SG | 23 | Mateo Drežnjak | 25 – 8 March 1999 | 1.96 m (6 ft 5 in) | SC Derby | (Montenegro) |
| SF | 24 | Dario Drežnjak | 26 – 24 March 1998 | 2.00 m (6 ft 7 in) | Zadar | (Croatia) |
| C | 40 | Ivica Zubac | 26 – 18 April 1997 | 2.16 m (7 ft 1 in) | Los Angeles Clippers | (United States) |
| F | 99 | Toni Nakić | 25 – 1 June 1999 | 2.00 m (6 ft 7 in) | Breogán | (Spain) |

Head coach

- (Croatia) Josip Sesar

Assistant coach(es)

- (Croatia) Ivan Perinčić
- (Croatia) Ivan Tomas

Legend

- (C) Team captain
- Club – describes last
  club before the competition
- Age – describes age
  on 2 July 2024

=== Dominican Republic ===
Dominican Republic men's national basketball team roster
Players
Coaches

| Pos. | No. | Name | Age – Date of birth | Height | Club | Ctr. |
|---|---|---|---|---|---|---|
| F | 0 | Antonio Peña | 37 – 20 July 1986 | 2.04 m (6 ft 8 in) | Gladiadores | (Venezuela) |
| PF | 1 | Ángel Núñez | 32 – 9 October 1991 | 2.03 m (6 ft 8 in) | Śląsk Wrocław | (Poland) |
| PG | 3 | Jean Montero | 20 – 3 July 2003 | 1.90 m (6 ft 3 in) | Andorra | (Spain) |
| SG | 5 | Víctor Liz | 38 – 12 May 1986 | 1.88 m (6 ft 2 in) | Caribbean Storm Islands | (Colombia) |
| PG | 7 | Adris De León | 39 – 10 July 1984 | 1.80 m (5 ft 11 in) | Spójnia Stargard | (Poland) |
| PG | 10 | Andrés Feliz | 26 – 15 July 1997 | 1.83 m (6 ft 0 in) | Club Joventut Badalona | (Spain) |
| C | 11 | Eloy Vargas | 35 – 30 December 1988 | 2.11 m (6 ft 11 in) | Titanes de Barranquilla | (Colombia) |
| PF | 14 | Miguel Angel Simon Garcia | 29 – 31 October 1994 | 2.04 m (6 ft 8 in) | Reales de La Vega | (Dominican Republic) |
| SG | 23 | Eddy Polanco | 29 – 5 August 1994 | 1.93 m (6 ft 4 in) | Real Betis | (Spain) |
| G | 24 | Adonys Henriquez | 29 – 13 October 1994 | 1.98 m (6 ft 6 in) | Real Esteli | (Nicaragua) |
| F | 27 | Chris Duarte | 27 – 13 June 1997 | 1.96 m (6 ft 5 in) | Sacramento Kings | (United States) |
| C | 40 | Luís Santos | 29 – 6 December 1994 | 2.03 m (6 ft 8 in) | Aguada | (Uruguay) |

Head coach

- (Argentina) Néstor García

Assistant coach(es)

- (Dominican Republic) David Diaz
- (Dominican Republic) Abraham Disla
- (Spain) Sergio Jimenez Saiz

Legend

- Club – describes last
  club before the tournament
- Age – describes age
  on 2 July 2024

=== Slovenia ===
Slovenia men's national basketball team roster
Players
Coaches

| Pos. | No. | Name | Age – Date of birth | Height | Club | Ctr. |
|---|---|---|---|---|---|---|
| PG | 6 | Aleksej Nikolić | 29 – 21 February 1995 | 1.91 m (6 ft 3 in) | Cedevita Olimpija | (Slovenia) |
| PG | 7 | Klemen Prepelič | 31 – 20 October 1992 | 1.92 m (6 ft 4 in) | Galatasaray | (Turkey) |
| SF | 8 | Edo Murić | 32 – 27 November 1991 | 2.02 m (6 ft 8 in) | Cedevita Olimpija | (Slovenia) |
| C | 9 | Josh Nebo | 26 – 17 July 1997 | 2.06 m (6 ft 9 in) | Olimpia Milano | (Italy) |
| SG | 15 | Gregor Hrovat | 29 – 18 August 1994 | 1.96 m (6 ft 5 in) | JDA Dijon | (France) |
| SG | 20 | Miha Cerkvenik | 22 – 9 November 2001 | 2.01 m (6 ft 7 in) | Krka | (Slovenia) |
| F | 23 | Luka Ščuka | 22 – 23 May 2002 | 2.10 m (6 ft 11 in) | Cedevita Olimpija | (Slovenia) |
| C | 27 | Žiga Dimec | 31 – 20 February 1993 | 2.11 m (6 ft 11 in) | Włocławek | (Poland) |
| SG | 30 | Zoran Dragić | 35 – 22 June 1989 | 1.96 m (6 ft 5 in) | Cedevita Olimpija | (Slovenia) |
| SF | 31 | Vlatko Čančar | 27 – 10 April 1997 | 2.03 m (6 ft 8 in) | Denver Nuggets | (United States) |
| SG | 37 | Leon Stergar | 24 – 17 March 2000 | 1.93 m (6 ft 4 in) | Krka | (Slovenia) |
| G | 77 | Luka Dončić (C) | 25 – 28 February 1999 | 2.01 m (6 ft 7 in) | Dallas Mavericks | (United States) |

Head coach

- (Slovenia) Aleksander Sekulić

Assistant coach(es)

- (Slovenia) Luka Bassin
- (Slovenia) Dejan Mihevc

Legend

- (C) Team captain
- Age – describes age
  on 2 July 2024
- Club – describes club
  in the 2023–24 season

=== New Zealand ===
New Zealand men's national basketball team roster
Players
Coaches

| Pos. | No. | Name | Age – Date of birth | Height | Club | Ctr. |
|---|---|---|---|---|---|---|
| F | 1 | Reuben Te Rangi | 29 – 14 October 1994 | 1.98 m (6 ft 6 in) | S.E. Melbourne Phoenix | (Australia) |
| PG | 2 | Izayah Le'afa | 27 – 7 November 1996 | 1.88 m (6 ft 2 in) | Sydney Kings | (Australia) |
| PF | 3 | Finn Delany | 28 – 12 August 1995 | 2.00 m (6 ft 7 in) | New Zealand Breakers | (New Zealand) |
| C | 5 | Yannick Wetzell | 27 – 8 July 1996 | 2.08 m (6 ft 10 in) | Alba Berlin | (Germany) |
| PF | 8 | Sam Mennenga | 22 – 12 December 2001 | 2.03 m (6 ft 8 in) | New Zealand Breakers | (New Zealand) |
| SG | 9 | Corey Webster | 35 – 29 November 1988 | 1.89 m (6 ft 2 in) | Perth Wildcats | (Australia) |
| PG | 11 | Flynn Cameron | 24 – 30 June 2000 | 1.95 m (6 ft 5 in) | Melbourne United | (Australia) |
| SG | 12 | Ethan Rusbatch | 32 – 24 May 1992 | 1.96 m (6 ft 5 in) | Franklin Bulls | (New Zealand) |
| PF | 15 | Thomas Vodanovich | 29 – 28 July 1994 | 2.01 m (6 ft 7 in) | S.E. Melbourne Phoenix | (Australia) |
| SF | 20 | Jordan Ngatai | 31 – 7 March 1993 | 1.96 m (6 ft 5 in) | Bay Hawks | (New Zealand) |
| C | 24 | Tyrell Harrison | 24 – 6 July 1999 | 2.13 m (7 ft 0 in) | Brisbane Bullets | (Australia) |
| PG | 51 | Shea Ili | 31 – 6 October 1992 | 1.84 m (6 ft 0 in) | Melbourne United | (Australia) |

Head coach

- (New Zealand) Pero Cameron

Assistant coach(es)

- (New Zealand) Ross McMains
- (New Zealand) Trent Adam
- (Serbia) Jovan Gorec

Legend

- Club – describes last
  club before the competition
- Age – describes age
  on 2 July 2024

=== Egypt ===
Egypt men's national basketball team roster
Players
Coaches

| Pos. | No. | Name | Age – Date of birth | Height | Club | Ctr. |
|---|---|---|---|---|---|---|
| PG | 0 | Ahmed Metwaly | 27 – 15 February 1997 | 1.77 m (5 ft 10 in) | El Ettehad | (Egypt) |
| SG | 3 | Yusuf Shehata | 28 – 16 January 1996 | 1.83 m (6 ft 0 in) | El Ettehad | (Egypt) |
| PF | 5 | Amr Gendy | 33 – 14 June 1991 | 1.93 m (6 ft 4 in) | Al Ahly | (Egypt) |
| PF | 6 | Haytham Khalifa | 36 – 17 November 1987 | 2.08 m (6 ft 10 in) | El Ettehad | (Egypt) |
| SG | 7 | Youssef Refaat | 23 – 20 June 2001 | 1.84 m (6 ft 0 in) | Sporting | (Egypt) |
| PF | 10 | Anas Mahmoud | 29 – 9 May 1995 | 2.14 m (7 ft 0 in) | El Ettehad | (Egypt) |
| PG | 11 | Karim Elgizawy | 19 – 13 January 2005 | 1.91 m (6 ft 3 in) | Al Ahly | (Egypt) |
| C | 15 | Patrick Gardner | 25 – 16 June 1999 | 2.11 m (6 ft 11 in) | Long Island Nets | (United States) |
| PF | 22 | Omar El-Sheikh | 26 – 14 May 1998 | 1.96 m (6 ft 5 in) | Pully Lausanne Foxes | (Switzerland) |
| PF | 28 | Khaled Abdelgawad | 25 – 15 February 1999 | 2.04 m (6 ft 8 in) | Zamalek | (Egypt) |
| SG | 44 | Omar Hesham | 29 – 29 March 1995 | 1.91 m (6 ft 3 in) | Zamalek | (Egypt) |
| C | 55 | Omar Oraby | 32 – 8 September 1991 | 2.18 m (7 ft 2 in) | Al Ahly | (Egypt) |

Head coach

- (Germany) Henrik Rödl

Assistant coach(es)

- (Egypt) Wael Badr
- (Egypt) Ramy Mohamed Talaat Mohamed Gunady Abdalla
- (Egypt) Mohamed Selim

Legend

- Club – describes last
  club before the tournament
- Age – describes age
  on 2 July 2024

== OQT San Juan, Puerto Rico ==
=== Puerto Rico ===
Puerto Rico men's national basketball team roster
Players
Coaches

| Pos. | No. | Name | Age – Date of birth | Height | Club | Ctr. |
|---|---|---|---|---|---|---|
| PF | 0 | Isaiah Piñeiro | 29 – 2 February 1995 | 2.01 m (6 ft 7 in) | Piratas de Quebradillas | (Puerto Rico) |
| F | 1 | George Conditt IV | 23 – 22 August 2000 | 2.11 m (6 ft 11 in) | Gigantes de Carolina | (Puerto Rico) |
| PG | 3 | Jordan Howard | 28 – 6 January 1996 | 1.80 m (5 ft 11 in) | Obradoiro | (Spain) |
| SG | 9 | Davon Reed | 29 – 11 June 1995 | 1.96 m (6 ft 5 in) | Memphis Hustle | (United States) |
| PG | 10 | Jose Alvarado | 26 – 12 April 1998 | 1.83 m (6 ft 0 in) | New Orleans Pelicans | (United States) |
| G | 11 | Stephen Thompson Jr. | 27 – 23 March 1997 | 1.94 m (6 ft 4 in) | Vaqueros de Bayamón | (Puerto Rico) |
| F | 12 | Aleem Ford | 26 – 22 December 1997 | 2.03 m (6 ft 8 in) | Lakeland Magic | (United States) |
| G | 24 | Gian Clavell | 30 – 26 November 1993 | 1.93 m (6 ft 4 in) | BC Prometey | (Ukraine) |
| C | 28 | Ismael Romero | 33 – 23 June 1991 | 2.06 m (6 ft 9 in) | Mets de Guaynabo | (Puerto Rico) |
| PF | 32 | Christopher Ortiz | 31 – 2 April 1993 | 2.03 m (6 ft 8 in) | Osos de Manati | (Puerto Rico) |
| PF | 41 | Arnaldo Toro Barea | 26 – 28 October 1997 | 2.02 m (6 ft 8 in) | VEF Riga | (Latvia) |
| PG | 51 | Tremont Waters | 26 – 10 January 1998 | 1.80 m (5 ft 11 in) | Gigantes de Carolina | (Puerto Rico) |

Head coach

- (Puerto Rico) Nelson Colón

Assistant coach(es)

- (Puerto Rico) Carlos González
- (Puerto Rico) Rafael Cruz

Legend

- Club – describes last
  club before the tournament
- Age – describes age
  on 2 July 2024

=== Italy ===
Italy men's national basketball team – 2024 FIBA Men's Olympic Qualifying Tournaments – San Juan roster
Players
Coaches

| Pos. | No. | Name | Age – Date of birth | Height | Club | Ctr. |
|---|---|---|---|---|---|---|
| G | 0 | Marco Spissu | 29 – 5 February 1995 | 1.84 m (6 ft 0 in) | Reyer Venezia | (Italy) |
| G | 1 | Nico Mannion | 23 – 13 March 2001 | 1.90 m (6 ft 3 in) | Pallacanestro Varese | (Italy) |
| F | 5 | Awudu Abass | 31 – 26 January 1993 | 1.98 m (6 ft 6 in) | BC Dubai | (United Arab Emirates) |
| G | 7 | Stefano Tonut | 30 – 7 November 1993 | 1.96 m (6 ft 5 in) | Olimpia Milano | (Italy) |
| PF | 8 | Danilo Gallinari | 35 – 7 August 1988 | 2.08 m (6 ft 10 in) | Milwaukee Bucks | (United States) |
| F | 9 | Nicolò Melli | 33 – 26 January 1991 | 2.05 m (6 ft 9 in) | Fenerbahçe S.K. | (Turkey) |
| PF | 17 | Giampaolo Ricci | 32 – 27 September 1991 | 2.00 m (6 ft 7 in) | Olimpia Milano | (Italy) |
| SG | 22 | Giordano Bortolani | 23 – 1 December 2000 | 1.93 m (6 ft 4 in) | Olimpia Milano | (Italy) |
| C | 30 | Guglielmo Caruso | 25 – 2 July 1999 | 2.08 m (6 ft 10 in) | Olimpia Milano | (Italy) |
| PF | 33 | Achille Polonara | 32 – 22 November 1991 | 2.05 m (6 ft 9 in) | Virtus Bologna | (Italy) |
| G | 54 | Alessandro Pajola | 24 – 9 November 1999 | 1.94 m (6 ft 4 in) | Virtus Bologna | (Italy) |
| SF | 77 | John Petrucelli | 31 – 26 October 1992 | 1.93 m (6 ft 4 in) | Pallacanestro Brescia | (Italy) |

Head coach

- (Italy) Gianmarco Pozzecco

Assistant coach(es)

- (Italy) Edoardo Casalone
- (Italy) Riccardo Fois
- (Italy) Federico Fucà
- (Italy) Giuseppe Poeta
- (Italy) Carlo Recalcati

Legend

- (C) Team captain
- Club – describes last
  club before the tournament
- Age – describes age
  on 2 July 2024

=== Lithuania ===
Lithuania men's basketball team roster
Players
Coaches

| Pos. | No. | Name | Age – Date of birth | Height | Club | Ctr. |
|---|---|---|---|---|---|---|
| SF | 8 | Tadas Sedekerskis | 26 – January 17, 1998 | 2.06 m (6 ft 9 in) | Baskonia | (Spain) |
| PF | 10 | Azuolas Tubelis | 22 – March 22, 2002 | 2.05 m (6 ft 9 in) | Rytas | (Lithuania) |
| C | 11 | Domantas Sabonis | 28 – May 3, 1996 | 2.11 m (6 ft 11 in) | Sacramento Kings | (United States) |
| G | 13 | Rokas Jokubaitis | 23 – 19 November 2000 | 1.94 m (6 ft 4 in) | Barcelona | (Spain) |
| F | 19 | Mindaugas Kuzminskas | 34 – 19 October 1989 | 2.05 m (6 ft 9 in) | AEK | (Greece) |
| C | 20 | Donatas Motiejūnas | 33 – 20 September 1990 | 2.13 m (7 ft 0 in) | AS Monaco | (France) |
| SG | 33 | Tomas Dimša | 30 – 2 January 1994 | 1.96 m (6 ft 5 in) | Žalgiris | (Lithuania) |
| SG | 40 | Marius Grigonis | 30 – April 26, 1994 | 1.98 m (6 ft 6 in) | Panathinaikos | (Greece) |
| G | 43 | Lukas Lekavičius | 30 – March 30, 1994 | 1.80 m (5 ft 11 in) | Žalgiris | (Lithuania) |
| SF | 51 | Arnas Butkevičius | 31 – October 22, 1992 | 1.96 m (6 ft 5 in) | Žalgiris | (Lithuania) |
| SF | 91 | Deividas Sirvydis | 24 – 10 June 2000 | 2.04 m (6 ft 8 in) | Zalgiris | (Lithuania) |
| SF | 92 | Edgaras Ulanovas | 32 – 7 January 1992 | 1.98 m (6 ft 6 in) | Žalgiris | (Lithuania) |

Head coach

- (Lithuania) Kazys Maksvytis

Assistant coach(es)

- (Lithuania) Giedrius Zibenas
- (Lithuania) Tomas Rinkevicius

Legend

- Club – describes last
  club before the tournament
- Age – describes age
  on 2 July 2024

=== Côte d'Ivoire ===
Ivory Coast men's national basketball team roster
Players
Coaches

| Pos. | No. | Name | Age – Date of birth | Height | Club | Ctr. |
|---|---|---|---|---|---|---|
| PG | 0 | Assémian Moularé | 21 – 21 January 2003 | 1.87 m (6 ft 2 in) | Vichy-Clermont | (France) |
| SG | 2 | Nisre Zouzoua | 27 – 16 July 1996 | 1.92 m (6 ft 4 in) | Jämtland Basket | (Sweden) |
| SG | 6 | Lionel Kouadio | 22 – 1 September 2001 | 1.92 m (6 ft 4 in) | CB Morón | (Spain) |
| SG | 7 | Maxence Dadiet | 25 – 2 March 1999 | 1.92 m (6 ft 4 in) | ABBR | (France) |
| PG | 10 | Solo Diabate | 36 – 21 July 1987 | 1.83 m (6 ft 0 in) | Al Ahly Benghazi | (Libya) |
| SF | 12 | Vafessa Fofana | 32 – 12 June 1992 | 2.00 m (6 ft 7 in) | Gravelines-Dunkerque | (France) |
| PF | 13 | Amadou Sidibé | 30 – 25 March 1994 | 2.03 m (6 ft 8 in) | Soproni KC | (Hungary) |
| C | 14 | Patrick Tapé | 26 – 8 June 1998 | 2.08 m (6 ft 10 in) | BC Nokia | (Finland) |
| PF | 21 | Deon Thompson | 35 – 16 September 1988 | 2.04 m (6 ft 8 in) | Shinshu Brave Warriors | (Japan) |
| C | 23 | Cédric Bah | 30 – 11 May 1994 | 2.00 m (6 ft 7 in) | Vichy-Clermont | (France) |
| PF | 26 | Joseph Mobio | 26 – 26 May 1998 | 1.99 m (6 ft 6 in) | Trapani Shark | (Italy) |
| SF | 77 | Jean-Philippe Dally | 28 – 8 March 1996 | 2.01 m (6 ft 7 in) | JDA Dijon | (France) |

Head coach

- (Spain) Natxo Lezkano

Assistant coach(es)

- (Spain) Miguel Angel Hoyo Ramos
- (Ivory Coast) Michael Toti

Legend

- Club – describes last
  club before the competition
- Age – describes age
  on 2 July 2024

=== Mexico ===
Mexico men's national basketball team roster
Players
Coaches

| Pos. | No. | Name | Age – Date of birth | Height | Club | Ctr. |
|---|---|---|---|---|---|---|
| G | 0 | Karim Rodriguez | 36 – 17 January 1988 | 1.96 m (6 ft 5 in) | Rayos de Hermosillo | (Mexico) |
| G | 1 | Isael Silva | 22 – 20 June 2002 | 1.93 m (6 ft 4 in) | Stanford | (United States) |
| PF | 3 | Fabián Jaimes | 31 – 22 September 1992 | 1.98 m (6 ft 6 in) | Panteras de Aguascalientes | (Mexico) |
| PG | 4 | Paul Stoll | 38 – 14 December 1985 | 1.80 m (5 ft 11 in) | Halcones de Xalapa | (Mexico) |
| F | 5 | Irwin Ávalos | 33 – 13 June 1991 | 2.01 m (6 ft 7 in) | Dorados de Chihuahua | (Mexico) |
| SG | 7 | Moisés Andriassi | 24 – 1 March 2000 | 1.87 m (6 ft 2 in) | Astros de Jalisco | (Mexico) |
| F | 10 | Gabriel Girón (C) | 36 – 27 February 1988 | 1.94 m (6 ft 4 in) | Halcones de Xalapa | (Mexico) |
| PF | 12 | Adrien Issac Porras | 15 – 24 November 2008 | 2.10 m (6 ft 11 in) | Hillcrest Preparatory | (United States) |
| PG | 16 | Iván Montano | 25 – 7 September 1998 | 1.80 m (5 ft 11 in) | Piratas de los Lagos | (Ecuador) |
| F | 21 | Karim López | 17 – 12 April 2007 | 2.01 m (6 ft 7 in) | Joventut Badalona | (Spain) |
| C | 25 | Israel Gutiérrez | 31 – 15 January 1993 | 2.06 m (6 ft 9 in) | Halcones de Xalapa | (Mexico) |
| C | 34 | Joshua Ibarra | 29 – 26 January 1995 | 2.11 m (6 ft 11 in) | Marinos B.B.C. | (Venezuela) |

Head coach

- (Mexico) Omar Quintero

Assistant coach(es)

- (United States) Kaleb Canales
- (Spain) Xavi Monferrer
- (Mexico) Gustavo Quintero

Legend

- (C) Team captain
- Club – describes last
  club before the tournament
- Age – describes age
  on 2 July 2024

=== Bahrain ===
Bahrain men's national basketball team roster
Players
Coaches

| Pos. | No. | Name | Age – Date of birth | Height | Club | Ctr. |
|---|---|---|---|---|---|---|
| G | 1 | Mohamed Buallay | 29 – 19 January 1995 | 1.90 m (6 ft 3 in) | Al-Muharraq BC | (Bahrain) |
| C | 2 | Wayne Chism | 37 – 16 June 1987 | 2.06 m (6 ft 9 in) | Al-Salam | (Saudi Arabia) |
| PG | 3 | Ahmed Haji | 29 – 6 November 1994 | 1.75 m (5 ft 9 in) | Al-Manama BC | (Bahrain) |
| PG | 6 | Ali Rashed | 23 – 6 September 2000 | 1.80 m (5 ft 11 in) | Al-Manama BC | (Bahrain) |
| G | 7 | Maitham Isa | 33 – 23 September 1990 | 1.83 m (6 ft 0 in) | Al-Ahli BC | (Bahrain) |
| F | 9 | Sadiq Hasan | 26 – 19 October 1997 | 1.85 m (6 ft 1 in) | Bahrain SC | (Bahrain) |
| PF | 10 | Subah Azzam | 30 – 6 December 1993 | 1.98 m (6 ft 6 in) | Al-Ahli BC | (Bahrain) |
| G | 15 | Ali Melad | 30 – 12 March 1994 | 1.70 m (5 ft 7 in) | Al-Ahli BC | (Bahrain) |
| PF | 23 | Mohammed Hammooda | 29 – 15 January 1995 | 1.98 m (6 ft 6 in) | Al-Manama BC | (Bahrain) |
| F | 24 | Muzamil Hammooda | 22 – 20 January 2002 | 1.99 m (6 ft 6 in) | Sacramento State | (United States) |
| C | 34 | Ali Hasan | 30 – 29 June 1994 | 1.93 m (6 ft 4 in) | Al-Muharraq BC | (Bahrain) |

Head coach

- (Lebanon) Jad El Hajj

Assistant coach(es)

- (Bahrain) Racem Marzougui
- (Bahrain) Ayman Sadeeq

Legend

- (C) Team captain
- Club – describes last
  club before the tournament
- Age – describes age
  on 2 July 2024
