= US Ansar =

- Leagues: Championnat Pro A
- Founded: 1946
- Arena: Salle de dar Chaâbane
- Capacity: 1,000
- Location: Dar Chaabane, Tunisia

Union Sportive El Ansar, commonly known as US Ansar, is a Tunisian basketball club based in Dar Chaabane. The club was founded in 1946 and currently plays in the Pro A, the highest level of Tunisian basketball. The team colours are green and orange.

The club entered the national first division for the first time in 1970. Since then, the club has had sporadic stints in the first division. In 2016, US Ansar promoted to the Pro A once again.

== Season by season ==
US Ansar has performed the following way in the Pro A:

Season	Tier	League	Regular season					Postseason	Tunisian Cup
Season	Tier	League	Finish	Played	Wins	Losses	Win%	Postseason	Tunisian Cup
US Ansar
2021–22	1	Pro A	9th	18	5	13	.278	3rd in Play-out	
2022–23	1	Pro A							

== Notable players ==
The following notable players have played for US Ansar over its history:

Note: Flags indicate national team eligibility at FIBA-sanctioned events. Players may hold other non-FIBA nationalities not displayed.

Criteria

To appear in this section a player must have either:

- Set a club record or won an individual award while at the club
- Played at least one official international match for their national team at any time
- Played at least one official NBA match at any time.

- (Senegal) Ibrahima Thomas
