= Miodrag Perišić (basketball) =

Serbian basketball coach

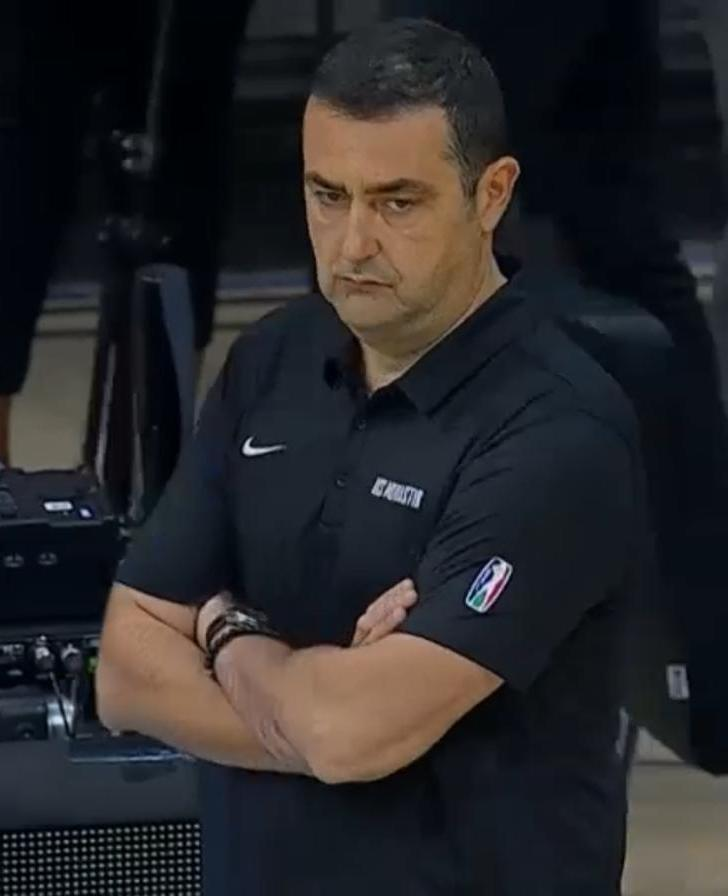
- Perišić in 2022

Shabab Al Ahli Club (basketball)
- Position: Head coach
- League: UAE National Basketball League; West Asia Super League

Personal information
- Born: 28 August 1972 (age 54) Belgrade, SR Serbia, Yugoslavia
- Listed height: 194 cm (6 ft 4 in)
- Listed weight: 96 kg (212 lb)
- Coaching career: 1999–present

Career history

Coaching
- 1999–2001: Avala Ada
- 2001–2002: KK Nova Pazova
- 2002–2004: Avala Ada
- 2005–2007: Cluj-Napoca
- 2008–2009: Otopeni
- 2009–2011: Zamalek
- 2011: Egypt men's national basketball team
- 2011–2012: Anibal Zahle
- 2012–2015: Sibiu
- 2015–2016: Tadamon Zouk
- 2016–2017: Manama
- 2017: Tadamon Zouk
- 2017–2018: Byblos
- 2018: Timișoara
- 2018–2020: Beirut Club
- 2020–2022: US Monastir
- 2020–2022: Qatar
- 2022: Al Ittihad Alexandria
- 2023: US Monastir
- 2023-2024: Al Wasl SC
- 2024–2025: Lebanon
- 2024-present: Shabab Al Ahli Club (basketball)

Career highlights
- As head coach: BAL champion (2022); FIBA West Asia Super League Gulf division Champion (2025); UAE National Basketball League champion (2026); Tunisian League champion (2022); Tunisian Cup winner (2022); Bahrain Basketball Supercup (2016); Lebanon Basketball Cup (2012); Dubai International Basketball Championship (2012)

Miodrag Perišić (Serbian Cyrillic: Миодраг Перишић; born 28 August 1972) is a Serbian professional basketball coach, who currently serves as the head coach of Shabab Al Ahli Club (basketball) in the UAE National Basketball League and West Asia Super League.

== Coaching career ==
Born in Belgrade, SR Serbia, SFR Yugoslavia (now Serbia), Perišić started coaching Crvena zvezda youth system. In 1999, he became the first head coach of newly established club Avala Ada - nowadays KK Mega Basket. In 2004, Perišić became the head coach of U-Mobitelco Cluj-Napoca in Romania.

Between 2004 and 2018, Perišić coached number of clubs from Romania, Egypt, Lebanon, and Bahrain.

In January 2019, Perišić signed with Beirut Club of the Lebanese Basketball League. He led the team to the finals of the Arab Club Basketball Championship. In 2020, Perišić signed to become the head coach of US Monastir of the Tunisian Championnat National A and the Basketball Africa League (BAL). On 28 May 2022, he won the 2022 BAL Finals with Monastir.

Perišić signed with Al Ittihad Alexandria in Egypt in June 2022. After Al Ittihad was eliminated in the quarterfinals of the 2022 Arab Basketball Championship, he rejoined US Monastir.

In 2023, Perišić moved to the United Arab Emirates and started coaching Al Wasl SC. In December 2024, Perišić is appointed as head coach of Shabab Al Ahli Club (basketball). In April 2025, under the leadership of Perišić, Shabab Al Ahli Club (basketball) won Gulf division of FIBA West Asia Super League, becoming the first Emirati club ever to win this championship. On June 1st, 2025, Shabab Al Ahli Club (basketball) also won the UAE Vice President's Basketball Cup. The success continued in 2026, when Shabab Al Ahli Club (basketball) won the UAE National Basketball League title under the leadership of Perišić.

== National team coaching career ==
The first national team coaching experience for Perišić was in 2011, when he coached Egypt national team at AfroBasket 2011. In 2020, Perišić coached the Qatar national team, a position he held until 2022. In May 2024, he became the head coach of Lebanon national team, starting his tenure with the 2024 FIBA Olympic qualifications. Under Perišić's leadership, Lebanon was among the first national teams qualifying for 2025 FIBA Asia Cup.

== Honours ==
Shabab Al Ahli Club (basketball)

- UAE National Basketball League champion: (2026)
- FIBA West Asia Super League Gulf division Champion: (2025)
- UAE Vice President`s Basketball Cup: (2025)

US Monastir

- BAL champion (2022)
- Championnat National A: (2022)
- Tunisian Basketball Cup: (2022)

Beirut Club

- Arab Club Basketball Championship runners-up: (2019)

Manama

- Bahraini Supercup: (2016)

== Head coaching record ==
Legend
Regular season	G	Games coached	W	Games won	L	Games lost	W–L %	Win–loss %
Playoffs	PG	Playoff games	PW	Playoff wins	PL	Playoff losses	PW–L %	Playoff win–loss %

=== BAL ===
Team	Year	G	W	L	W–L%	Finish	PG	PW	PL	PW–L%	Result
2022	Monastir	4	4	1	.800	2nd in Sahara Conference	3	3	0	1.000	Won BAL Championship
