= ES Goulettoise =

Étoile Sportive Goulettoise
- Leagues: Championnat Pro A
- Founded: 1927; 99 years ago
- Arena: Salle couverte de La Goulette-Le Kram
- Capacity: 1,800
- Location: La Goulette
- Team colors: Green and white
- Championships: 7 Tunisian League; 3 Tunisian Cup; 1 Tunisian Federation Cup
Home	Away

The Étoile Sportive Goulettoise (Arabic: النجم الرياضي بحلق الوادي), commonly known as ES Goulettoise (ESG), is a Tunisian professional basketball club founded in 1968 following the merger between the Club Sportif Goulettois (CSG) and the Club Olympique du Kram (COK). Benefiting from the grassroots work of the Club Sportif Goulettois, it quickly established itself among the major clubs in the national division. However, the 2000s saw its fall and its takeover by the Étoile Sportif Goulettoise (ESG). The Étoile Olympique La Goulette Kram no longer has a basketball section.

== History ==
The city of La Goulette was one of the first in Tunisia to adopt basketball. Its team, called Goulette Sports, was one of the first three associations of the discipline, created in 1934, along with the Alliance sportive and the Vaillante d'Hammam Lif. In 1935–36, it finished second in the first Tunisian men's basketball championship and had fourteen licensed players, including Tunisian Hédi Fathallah. For their part, the Étoile sportive goulettoise (ESG) made a brief appearance in 1942 before resuming its activity in 1950, calling on Hédi and Hassen Fathallah, Amor Ben Jemiaa, Rachid Bey, Abdelaziz Ben Ahmed or Ezzedine Ayachi. The COK and the Union sportive goulettoise (USG) followed in 1952 but only the ESG remained and merged with the USG to form the Club sportif goulettois in 1962. The latter moved up to the national division in 1963 with a team composed of Manoubi Boukraa, Abdessattar Ismail or Mustapha Touati. But the club only spent two seasons among the elite despite the contribution of its young players of the time such as Ridha Laâbidi, Ahmed Charfeddine, Ferid Abbes, Abouda Ben Brahim and Hamouda Soufi.

The club then focused on the junior categories (three titles in the minors, three in the cadets and then a double in the juniors) and the EOGK was put on track from its creation. During the 2009–10 season, ESG returned to Championnat Pro A after finishing second in Championnat Nationale 1 following its defeat in the final against Tunis Air Club. In 2014, ESG won the Federation Cup in the final by beating JS Menazah. During the 2015–16 season, ESG won the Championnat Pro A Fair Play Award.

At the end of the 2020–21 season, the club took fourth place in the play-out and was relegated to Championnat Nationale 1 after losing the play-off match against JS Menazah 64–65 at the Grombalia Indoor Hall. During the 2021–22 season, ESG finished second in the second division and qualified for the super play-out with five Championnat Pro A teams. In the super play-out, the club finished sixth and final in the standings and remained in Championnat Nationale 1. During the 2022–23 season, ESG returned to the Championnat Pro A division, defeating Basket Club Mahdia in the final in three games (78–71 / 64–61 in La Goulette and 85–70 in Mahdia).

At the end of the 2024–25 season, the club finished last in the play-out and was relegated to Championnat Nationale 1.

== Honours ==
=== National ===
- Championnat Pro A

Champions (7): 1984–85, 1985–86, 1986–87, 1987–88, 1989–90, 1990–91, 1994–95
Runner-up (5): 1980–81, 1981–82, 1983–84, 1988–89, 1992–93

- Tunisian Cup

Champions (3): 1983–84, 1985–86, 1991–92
Runner-up (2): 1971–72, 1984–85

- Championnat Nationale 1

Champions (1): 2022–23

- Tunisian Federation Cup

Champions (1): 2014

=== Regional ===
- Arab Club Championship

Runner-up (2): 1988, 1992

- Maghreb Club Championship

Champions (2): 1988, 1989
Runner-up (1): 1987
