= Chris DeMarco =

American basketball coach (born 1985)

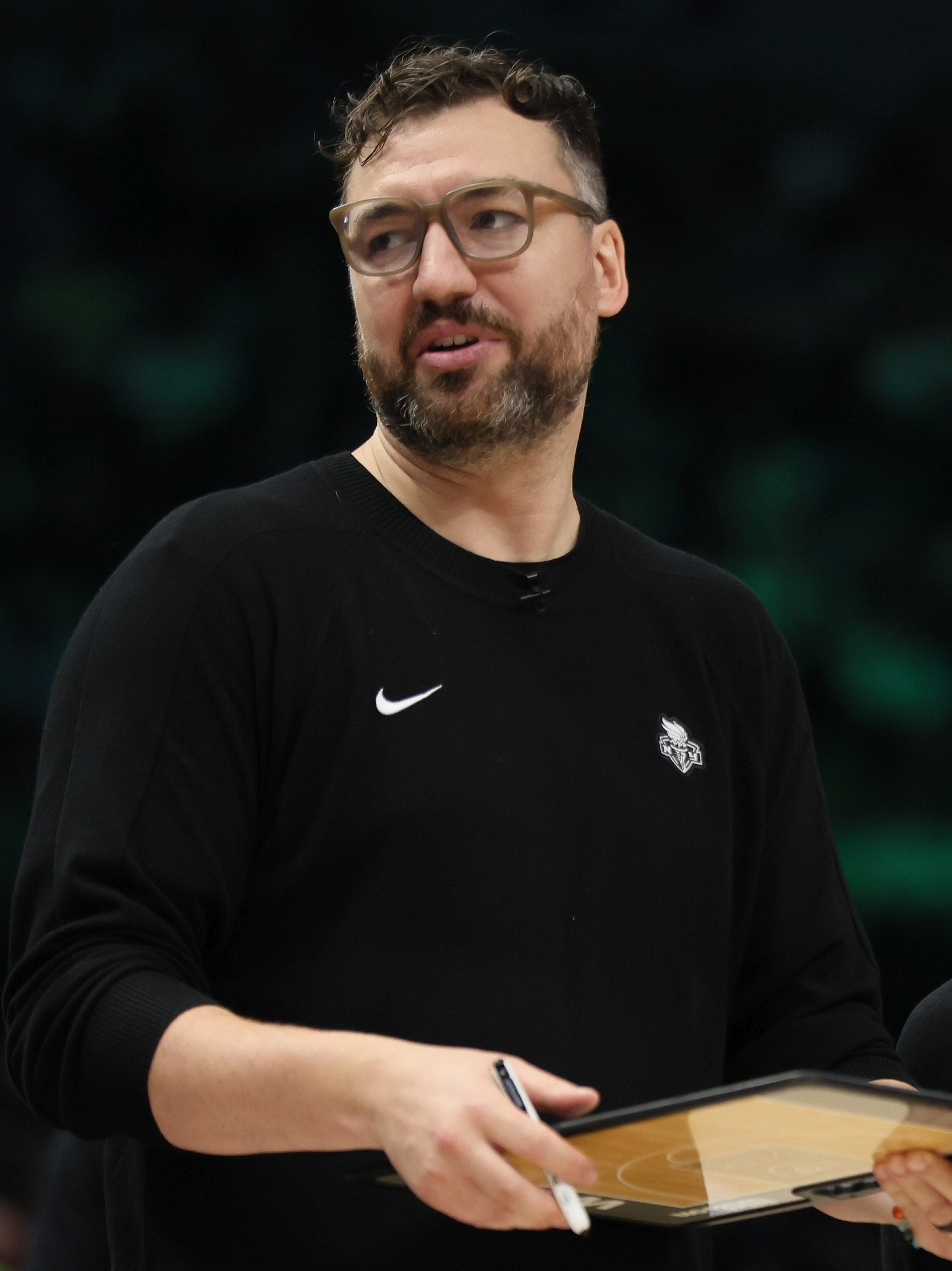
- DeMarco with the New York Liberty in 2026

Personal information
- Born: September 26, 1985 (age 41) Appleton, Wisconsin, U.S.
- Listed height: 6 ft 6 in (1.98 m)

Career information
- College: Dominican University of California
- Position: Head coach

Career history

Coaching
- 2012–2026: Golden State Warriors (assistant)
- 2019–2025: Bahamas
- 2026: New York Liberty

Career highlights
- As head coach: WNBA Commissioner's Cup Champion (2026); As assistant coach: 4× NBA champion (2015, 2017, 2018, 2022)

Christopher DeMarco (born September 26, 1985) is an American basketball coach who was most recently the head coach for the New York Liberty of the Women's National Basketball Association (WNBA) and the Bahamas men's national basketball team.

== Career ==
DeMarco began his coaching career in 2012 as an assistant coach with the Golden State Warriors of the National Basketball Association (NBA). In 2019, he was appointed head coach of the Bahamas men's national basketball team. On November 21, 2025, DeMarco left the Warriors to become the new head coach for the New York Liberty of the WNBA.

He has served following positions through his coaching career.

- Assistant coach for the Golden State Warriors during their NBA Championship victories in 2015, 2017, 2018, and 2022.
- Represented the Western Conference as an assistant coach in the NBA All-Star Game in both 2015 and 2017.

== See also ==
- Golden State Warriors
- 2024 FIBA Men's Olympic Qualifying Tournaments squads
