= American International School of Sydney =

Location
- Carlingford, New South Wales; Australia; 33°47′10.65″S 151°1′58.54″E

Information
- Type: Primary and Secondary
- Established: 1999
- Closed: 2009
- Grades: Preschool through Year 12
- Website: https://web.archive.org/web/20010401085510/ http://www.amschool.com.au/

The American International School of Sydney was an international school located in Epping, Sydney, New South Wales, Australia.

The school operated, in part, under the sponsorship of the United States Ambassador to Australia and awarded the American High School Diploma, which all graduates received upon completion of their studies.

The school closed in 2009 due to low enrolments and attempted to obtain finance to reopen in 2012.

== Notable alumni ==
Alumni students included American film and stage actor Aaron Eckhart, and Sudanese-born professional basketball player Ater Majok.

== See also ==
- List of non-government schools in New South Wales
- List of international schools
- American Australians
