= Ibrahima Thomas =

Senegalese basketball player (born 1987)

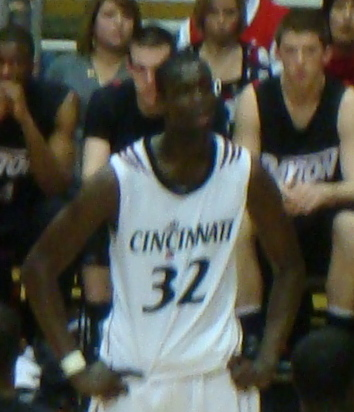
- Thomas with Cincinnati in 2010

Al-Nasr
- Position: Power forward / center
- League: BAL

Personal information
- Born: 7 February 1987 (age 39) Dakar, Senegal
- Listed height: 2.13 m (7 ft 0 in)
- Listed weight: 109 kg (240 lb)

Career information
- High school: Stoneridge Prep (Simi Valley, California)
- College: Oklahoma State (2007–2009); Cincinnati (2009–2011)
- NBA draft: 2011: undrafted
- Playing career: 2011–present

Career history
- 2011–2013: Texas Legends
- 2013: Al Sadd
- 2013–2014: Azad University
- 2014–2015: Al-Muharraq
- 2015: Al Hilal
- 2015–2016: Cáceres
- 2016–2017: Al-Ittihad
- 2017–2018: Saitama Broncos
- 2018: ES Radès
- 2018–2019: Hoops Club
- 2019: Al-Nasr Benghazi
- 2019: Al-Wehdat
- 2020–2021: US Ansar
- 2021: AS Police
- 2021: Bahrain SC
- 2021–2022: Orthodox
- 2022: Al-Nasr Benghazi
- 2022: Ohud Medina
- 2022–2023: Dynamo Lebanon
- 2023: US Monastir
- 2023: Champville
- 2024: AS Douanes
- 2024–present: Al-Nasr

Career highlights
- BAL rebounding leader (2021)
Medals
Men's basketball
Representing Senegal
FIBA Africa Championship
Bronze medal – third place	2013 Abidjan	Team

Ibrahima Thomas (born 7 February 1987) is a Senegalese professional basketball player who currently plays for Al-Nasr in Kuwait. He previously also played for the Senegal national basketball team. Thomas played college basketball for Oklahoma State before transferring to Cincinnati as a sophomore.

== Professional career ==
On 24 December 2021, Thomas signed with Jordanian club Orthodox for the 2021–22 season of the Premier League.

On 24 September 2022, he joined Ohud Medina of the Saudi Premier League.

On 27 February 2023, Thomas was announced by US Monastir, the defending champions of the BAL, for the 2023 season.

In March 2024, Thomas joined AS Douanes for the 2024 BAL season.

== National team career ==
Thomas has played for the Senegalese national basketball team. He was a member of the teams at AfroBasket 2013 and AfroBasket 2015 and the 2014 FIBA Basketball World Cup.

== BAL career statistics ==
Legend
GP	Games played	GS	Games started	MPG	Minutes per game
FG%	Field goal percentage	3P%	3-point field goal percentage	FT%	Free throw percentage
RPG	Rebounds per game	APG	Assists per game	SPG	Steals per game
BPG	Blocks per game	PPG	Points per game	**Bold**	Career high
*	Led the league

Year	Team	GP	GS	MPG	FG%	3P%	FT%	RPG	APG	SPG	BPG	PPG
2021	AS Police	3	3	32.4	.381	.286	.444	12.0*	3.3	1.7	.7	13.3
2023	US Monastir	5	5	25.3	.431	.464	.588	7.0	.4	.2	.8	13.4
