= Amrou Bouallegue =

Tunisian basketball player

No. 14 – US Monastir
- Position: Point guard
- League: Pro A BAL

Personal information
- Born: 24 December 1995 (age 30) Radès, Tunisia
- Listed height: 1.92 m (6 ft 4 in)

Career information
- Playing career: 2014–present

Career history
- 2014–2022: ES Radès
- 2022–present: US Monastir

Career highlights
- 2× Tunisian League champion (2017, 2018); 3× Tunisian Cup winner (2017–2019)

Amrou Bouallegue (born 24 December 1995) is a Tunisian professional basketball player for US Monastir and the Tunisian national team.

== Professional career ==
He started his career with ES Radès in 2014 and played there for eight seasons, and won two Pro A championships and three Tunisian Cups with the team. Bouallegue signed for US Monastir on 9 November 2022.

== National team career ==
Bouallegue made his debut for the Tunisia national team on 19 February 2021 during the qualifiers for AfroBasket 2021. He later represented Tunisia at the main tournament of FIBA AfroBasket 2021, where the team won the gold medal.
