= Espérance Sportive de Tunis (basketball) =

- Founded: 1946
- Location: Tunis, Tunisia
- Website: www.esperance-de-tunis.net/basketball/
Home

Espérance Sportive de Tunis is a Tunisian basketball club based in Tunis, as the basketball section of Espérance Sportive de Tunis. They currently play in the Championnat National 1, the second division.

== History ==
The sports club Espérance Sportive de Tunis was founded in 1919, however, it was years later in 1946 that the basketball team was founded. After the Tunisian independence, the club re-organised and won the third division in 1958, the second division in 1959 and then reached the Championnat Pro A for the first time under head coach Bob Saïdane.

Espérance played its best seasons during the 1970s, as they won three national championships and four national cups. During the 1980s, two more cup titles followed. In 1995, Espérance missed the national play-offs and as a result, the club's management decided to dissolve the team.

After more than a decade of absence, the club was revived following a decision during the 24 September 2011 general assembly of the club. Mortadha Benhassine, a former player for the team, announced the decision. Six years later, Espérance won the Second Division in 2017.

== Honours ==
Championnat Pro A

- Champions (3): 1976–77, 1978–79, 1979–80

Tunisian Basketball Cup

- Winners (6): 1976–77, 1977–78, 1978–79, 1986–87, 1988–89, 1993–94

Championnat National 1

- Champions (2): 1958–59
