= 2022 Arab Basketball Championship =

Tournament details
- Host country: United Arab Emirates
- City: Dubai
- Dates: 8–16 February
- Teams: 9 (from 2 confederations)
- Venue: 1 (in 1 host city)

Final positions
- Champions: Lebanon (1st title)
- Runners-up: Tunisia
- Third place: Algeria
- Fourth place: Somalia

Tournament statistics
- MVP: (Lebanon) Wael Arakji
- Top scorer: (Tunisia) Mohamed Hdidane

2022 Arab Basketball Championship for Men National Teams was the 24th edition of the Arab Basketball Championship, a men's basketball regional championship of Arab world that ended with Lebanon being crowned winner. The tournament was hosted by UAE for the first time and featured 16 teams.

== Host selection ==
The Arab Confederation of basketball proceeded Saturday 6/02/2022 to a reorganization of the program of the 24th edition of the Arab Nations Championship, to be held from 8 to 16 February in Dubai, United Arab Emirates (UAE), following the defection of Syria

== Draw ==
9 Team entered the game on first but Morocco and Syria withdrew the tournament.

Africa

- Algeria
- Libya
- Morocco (withdrew)
- Somalia
- Tunisia

Asia

- Jordan
- Lebanon
- Syria (withdrew)
- United Arab Emirates (hosts)

The 7 team divided into two groups.

Goupe	Team
Groupe 1	Libya; Tunisia; Jordan; United Arab Emirates
Groupe 2	Algeria; Somalia; Lebanon
Total	7

== Squads ==
Each team consisted of 12 players.

Tunisia :

Lebanon: Ali Haidar, Ater Majok, Wael Arakji, Jad Khalil, Ali Mansour, Ali Mezher, Karim Zeinoun, Amir Saoud, Jimmy Salem, Hayk Gyokochyan, Sergio El Darwich, Christophe Khalil. Head Coach: Jad El Hajj

== Venues ==
The tournament was hosted in Dubai in Rashid Bin Hamdan Hall, the complex belongs to Al-Nasr SC.

Dubai	2022 Arab Basketball Championship is located in United Arab Emirates
Rashid Bin Hamdan Hall	2022 Arab Basketball Championship is located in United Arab Emirates
Capacity: 2,500	2022 Arab Basketball Championship is located in United Arab Emirates

== Preliminary round ==
=== Group A ===
Pos	Team	Pld	W	L	GF	GA	GD	Pts	Qualification
1	Tunisia	3	3	0	214	165	+49	6	Semi-finals
2	Libya	3	2	1	237	207	+30	5	Quarter-finals
3	United Arab Emirates (H)	3	1	2	205	260	−55	4	Quarter-finals
4	Jordan	3	0	3	206	230	−24	3	Quarter-finals

Rules for classification: 1) Points; 2) Head-to-head results; 3) Points difference; 4) Points scored.
(H) Hosts

8 February 2022
18:00

fibalivestats

United Arab Emirates	85–81	Jordan
Scoring by quarter: 27 -26, 20-15, 22-22, 16-18
Pts: Nasser Alzaabi 22; Rebs: Omar Alshabebi 14; Asts: Nasser Alzaabi 2		Pts: Hawwas 20; Rebs: Abuwazaneh 4 Asts: Mustafa 3

Rashid Bin Hamdan Hall, Dubai

9 February 2022
20:00

fibalivestats

Tunisia	64–63	Libya
Scoring by quarter: 17-13, 19-13, 10-21, 18-16
Pts: El Mabrouk 13; Rebs: Saada 13; Asts: Abada 4		Pts: Bouzekieh 15; Rebs: Sadi 9 Asts: Mansour 3

Rashid Bin Hamdan Hall, Dubai

10 February 2022
18:00

fibalivestats

Tunisia	64–56	Jordan
Scoring by quarter: 15-16, 13-16, 20-13, 16-11
Pts: El Mabrouk 19; Rebs: Saada8; Asts: Abada 6		Pts: Ware19; Rebs: Alhamarsheh 10; Asts: Mustafa 5

Rashid Bin Hamdan Hall, Dubai

10 February 2022
20:00

fibalivestats

Libya	93–74	United Arab Emirates
Scoring by quarter: 18 -18, 22-17, 24-26, 29-13
Pts: Bouzekieh 27; Rebs: Sadi 12; Asts: Sadi 5		Pts: Almaazmi 16; Rebs: Omar Alshabebi 0 Asts: Nasser Alzaabi 2

Rashid Bin Hamdan Hall, Dubai

11 February 2022
16:00

fibalivestats

Libya	81–69	Jordan
Scoring by quarter: 25-19, 12-16, 23-19, 21-15
Pts: Bouzekieh 21; Rebs: Sadi 13; Asts: Sadi 11		Pts: Ware 16; Rebs: Abuwazaneh 6 Asts: Mustafa 3

Rashid Bin Hamdan Hall, Dubai

11 February 2022
20:00

fibalivestats

Tunisia	86–46	United Arab Emirates
Scoring by quarter: 17-14, 22-14, 17-6, 30-12
Pts: Hadidane 15; Rebs: Ghyaza 10; Asts: El Mabrouk 3		Pts: Alshabebi 15; Rebs: Almaazmi 7 Asts: Alhashmi 3

Rashid Bin Hamdan Hall, Dubai

=== Group B ===
Pos	Team	Pld	W	L	PF	PA	PD	Pts	Qualification
1	Lebanon	2	2	0	193	143	+50	4	Quarter-finals
2	Algeria	2	1	1	178	150	+28	3	Quarter-finals
3	Somalia	2	0	2	144	227	−83	2	Quarter-finals

Rules for classification: 1) Points; 2) Head-to-head results; 3) Points difference; 4) Points scored.

8 February 2022
20:00

fibalivestats

Algeria	112–67	Somalia
Scoring by quarter: 28-16, 21-18, 31-15, 32-18
Pts: Hamdini 35; Rebs: Bourakaib 8 Asts: Bellil 5		Pts: Aden 14; Rebs: Eid 8 Asts: Guled 4

Rashid Bin Hamdan Hall, Dubai

9 February 2022
18:00

fibalivestats

Somalia	77–115	Lebanon
Scoring by quarter: 13-30, 18-23, 18-30, 18-32
Pts: Guled 20; Rebs: Abdi 8 Asts: Abdi 3		Pts: Arakji 21; Rebs: Majok 11; Asts: Arakji 5

Rashid Bin Hamdan Hall, Dubai

11 February 2022
18 :00

fibalivestats

Algeria	66–83	Lebanon
Scoring by quarter: 18- 15, 19-24, 11-30, 18-14
Pts: Ammour 16; Rebs: Ghezzoul 13; Asts: Bourakaib 4		Pts: Arakji 23; Rebs: Majok 10; Asts: Khalil 4

Rashid Bin Hamdan Hall, Dubai

== Knockout stage ==
=== Bracket ===
Quarter-finals
13 February
Algeria	73
United Arab Emirates	66
13 February
Somalia	92
Libya	88
13 February
Lebanon	64
Jordan	52

Semi-finals
15 February
Tunisia	74
Algeria	61
15 February
Somalia	72
Lebanon	87

Final
16 February
Tunisia	69
Lebanon	72
Third place
16 February
Algeria	93
Somalia	79

=== Quarter-finals ===
13 February 2022
16:00

fibalivestats

Libya	88–92	Somalia
Scoring by quarter: 18-26, 22-16, 17-20, 31-30
Pts: Almaghribi 20; Rebs: Almaghribi 17; Asts: Sadi 7		Pts: Aden 24; Rebs: Abdi 13; Asts: Guled 8

Rashid Bin Hamdan Hall, Dubai

13 February 2022
18:00

fibalivestats

Lebanon	64–52	Jordan
Scoring by quarter: 16-12, 15-10, 18-16, 15-14
Pts: Darwich 15; Rebs: Majok 13; Asts: Saoud 4		Pts: Hawwas 14; Rebs: Abuwazaneh 7 Asts: Mustafa 3

Rashid Bin Hamdan Hall, Dubai

13 February 2022
20:00

fibalivestats

Algeria	73–66	United Arab Emirates
Scoring by quarter: 18 -14, 16-19, 21-14, 18-19
Pts: Hamdini 20; Rebs: Ammour 21; Asts: Bourakaib 3		Pts: Alshabebi 22; Rebs: Alshabebi 9 Asts: Alzaabi 4

Rashid Bin Hamdan Hall, Dubai

=== Semi-finals ===
15 February 2022
18:00

fibalivestats

Tunisia	74–61	Algeria
Scoring by quarter: 24-14, 23-15, 14-20, 13-12
Pts: Abada 33; Rebs: Saada 10; Asts: Chennoufi 3		Pts: Ammour 19; Rebs: Ammour 13; Asts: Bourakaib 2

Rashid Bin Hamdan Hall, Dubai

15 February 2022
20:00

fibalivestats

Somalia	72–87	Lebanon
Scoring by quarter: 22-24, 19- 24, 13-20, 18-19
Pts: Aden 28; Rebs: Mohamed 10; Asts: Abdi 3		Pts: Khalil 16; Rebs: Majok 11; Asts: Saoud 4

Rashid Bin Hamdan Hall, Dubai

=== Third place ===
16 February 2022
17:00

fibalivestats

Algeria	93–79	Somalia
Scoring by quarter: 18-19, 25-25, 23-22, 27-13
Pts: Touati20; Rebs: Ammour12; Asts: Ammour 4		Pts: Mohamed 15; Rebs: Abdi 10; Asts: Abdi 2

Rashid Bin Hamdan Hall, Dubai

=== Final ===
16 February 2022
20:00

fibalivestats

Tunisia	69–72	Lebanon
Scoring by quarter: 21-18, 13-19, 20-15, 15-20
Pts: Hadidane 18; Rebs: Abada 6 Asts: Hadidane4		Pts: Arakji 22; Rebs: Darwich 9 Asts: Arakji 2

Rashid Bin Hamdan Hall, Dubai
Referees: Mohammed Rayan (EGY), Abdullah Al-Admawi (KSA), Taha Al-Hashedi (YEM)

== Final standings ==
Rank	Team	Record
1st place, gold medalist(s)	Lebanon	5–0
2nd place, silver medalist(s)	Tunisia	4–1
3rd place, bronze medalist(s)	Algeria	3–2
4	Somalia	1–4
5	Libya	2–2
6	United Arab Emirates	1–3
7	Jordan	0–4

== Statistics and awards ==
=== Statistical leaders ===
==== Players ====
Name	PPG

Rebounds

Name	RPG

Assists

Name	APG

Blocks

Name	BPG

Steals

Name	SPG

Efficiency

Name	EFFPG

==== Teams ====
Points

Team	PPG

Rebounds

Team	RPG

Assists

Team	APG

Blocks

Team	BPG

Steals

Team	SPG

Efficiency

Team	EFFPG

=== Awards ===
The awards were announced on .

2022 Arab Basketball Championship winners

Lebanon
XX title

All-Star team
Guards	Forwards	Center
> xxx	> xxx	> xxx > xxx > xxx
MVP: > xxx

== Broadcasting ==
- Arab basketball federation web site :abbconf
- Dubai Sports
