= Dar Chaabane =

Dar Chaabane دار شعبان
- Commune and town
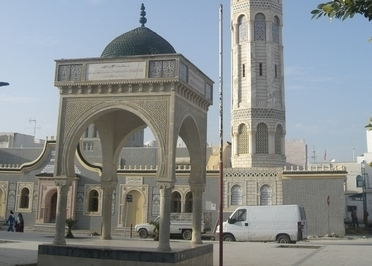

- Location within Tunisia
- Coordinates: 36°28′12″N 10°45′0″E
- Country: Tunisia
- Governorate: Nabeul Governorate

Government
  - Mayor: Saida Essid (Nidaa Tounes)

Area
  - Land: 14 sq mi (35 km^{2})

Population (2022)
  - Total: 52,406
- Time zone: UTC+1 (CET)
- Website: www.commune-darchaabaneelfehry.gov.tn

Dar Chaabane (full name Dar Chaabane El Fehri) is a town and a commune in the Nabeul Governorate, Tunisia on the coast of Cap Bon. In 2014, its population was 42,140. The municipality is the result of a merger in 1957 between the town of El Fehri located on the coast and the town of Dar Chaabane located in the hinterland. Covering 3,500 hectares, Dar Chaabane is one of the biggest towns of the peninsula of Cap Bon.

== History ==
Dar Chaabane was founded in the year 53 AH (7th century) by Chaabane Mechmech, a warlord of the Muslim Army in the Cap Bon region. He built a citadel in the town around which members of his family came to live, whence the name of Dar Chaabane or "the House of Chaabane". In the year 334 AH (10th century), Ahmed Fehri El Ansari, a native of Seguia el-Hamra in Morocco, settled a few kilometers away from Dar Chaabane and married a descendant of the commander Mechmech. With the newcomers, their progeny later founded the town of Zaouiet El Fehri.

Dar Chaabane's history is linked to the arrival of Andalusian Moors, expelled from Spain during the Reconquista in the 15th century.

== See also ==
- List of cities in Tunisia
