= Ater Majok =

Lebanese basketball player (born 1987)

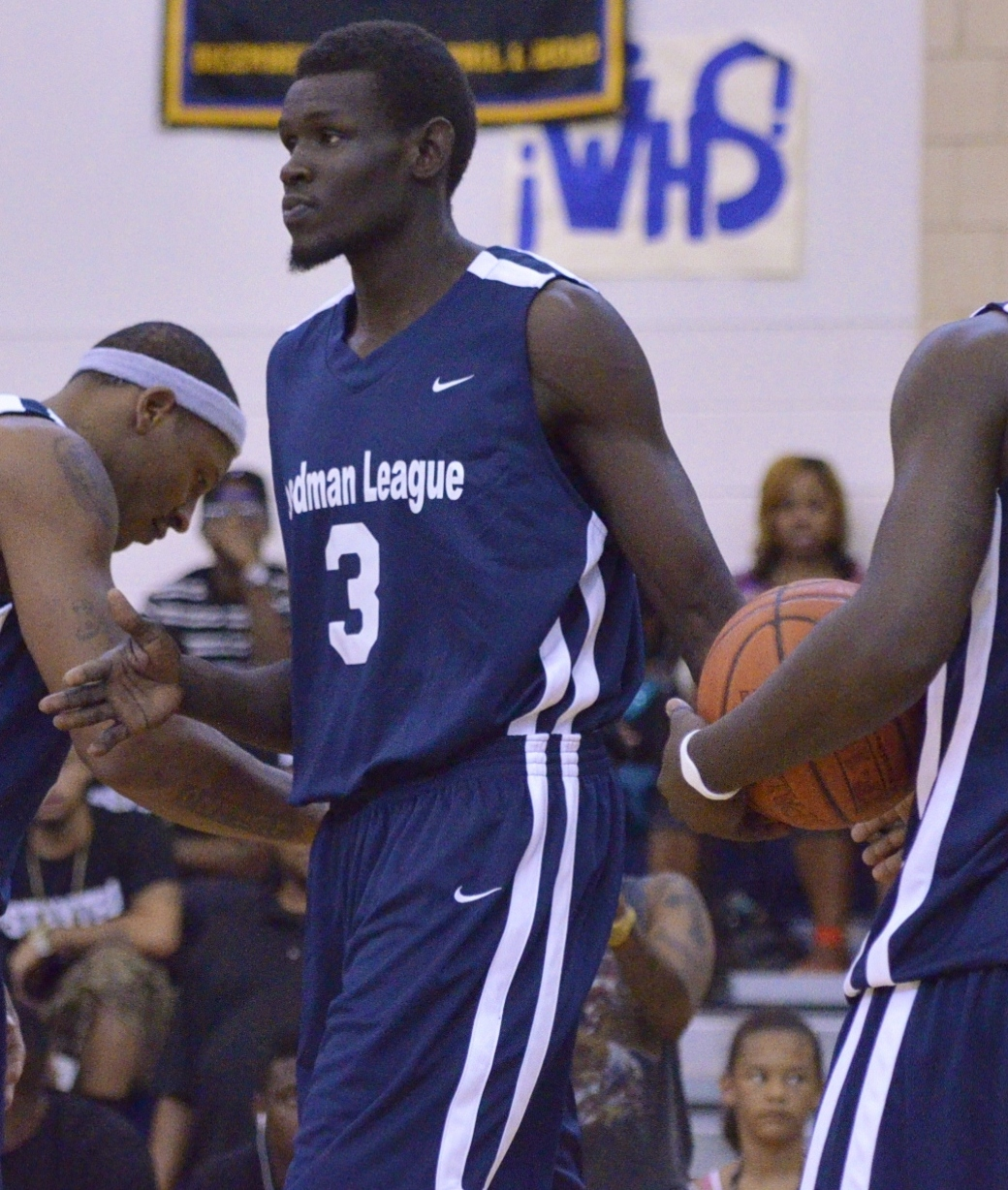
- Majok in 2012

No. 13 – Patriots BBC
- Position: Center

Personal information
- Born: 4 July 1987 (age 39) Khartoum, Sudan
- Listed height: 6 ft 11 in (2.11 m)
- Listed weight: 235 lb (107 kg)

Career information
- High school: American International School of Sydney (Sydney, New South Wales)
- College: UConn (2009–2010)
- NBA draft: 2011: 2nd round, 58th overall pick
- Drafted by: Los Angeles Lakers
- Playing career: 2010–present

Career history
- 2010: FMV Işık Okulları
- 2010–2011: Perth Wildcats
- 2011: Gold Coast Blaze
- 2011–2012: SPU Nitra
- 2012–2013: BC Minsk
- 2013: Busan KCC Egis
- 2013–2014: BG Göttingen
- 2014–2015: Los Angeles D-Fenders
- 2015–2016: Trefl Sopot
- 2016: Beijing Bucks
- 2016–2017: Homenetmen Beirut
- 2017: Luoyang Zhonghe
- 2017–2018: Sagesse SC
- 2018: Al-Muharraq
- 2018: Shaanxi Xinda
- 2018–2019: Champville SC
- 2019: Shaanxi Xinda
- 2019–2020: New Zealand Breakers
- 2020–2021: Al-Arabi
- 2020–2021: US Monastir
- 2021: Beirut Club
- 2021–2022: Ezzahra Sports
- 2022: US Monastir
- 2022: Bucaneros de La Guaira
- 2022–2023: Al Riyadi Beirut
- 2023: Petro de Luanda
- 2023: Patriots
- 2023: Al Ahly Benghazi
- 2023–2024: Sagesse SC
- 2024: US Monastir
- 2024: Mineros de Zacatecas
- 2024: Petro de Luanda
- 2024: Nairobi City Thunder
- 2025: Sagesse SC
- 2025: ASC Ville de Dakar
- 2025–2026: Urunani
- 2026: Rajawali Medan
- 2026–present: Beirut Club

Career highlights
- IBL block leader (2026); BAL champion (2022); BAL Defensive Player of the Year (2022); All-BAL First Team (2022); 2× BAL All-Defensive First Team (2022, 2023); BAL All-Defensive Second Team (2024); Chinese NBL champion (2018); 3× Chinese NBL Defensive Player of the Year (2016, 2018, 2019); Henri Chalhoub Tournament champion (2017); German Second League champion (2014); Belarus League champion (2013); Slovakia Cup champion (2012); 2× Tunisian League champion (2020, 2021); Tunisian League Best Foreign Player (2020)
- Stats at Basketball Reference
Medals
Men's basketball
Representing Lebanon
Arab Basketball Championship
Gold medal – first place	Dubai 2022

Ater James "AJ" Majok (born 4 July 1987) is a professional basketball player for Patriots BBC. Born in Sudan and raised in Australia, Majok represents Lebanon internationally. He was drafted by the Los Angeles Lakers in the 2011 NBA draft with the 58th overall pick. Standing at 6 ft 11 in (2.11 m), Majok mostly stands out with his athletic and defensive abilities. He was the BAL Defensive Player of the Year in 2022.

== High school and college career ==
Majok was born in Sudan in 1987. He migrated to Sydney through a refugee camp in Egypt. Upon arrival in Sydney, he bonded with a group of young men also from Sudan, called the South Stars basketball team.

He attended high school at St Aloysius' College and Parramatta Marist High School in Sydney, and the American International School in Carlingford where he graduated in 2008.

After graduating, Majok committed to the University of Connecticut. He sat out during the 2008–09 season because he was not cleared to play by the NCAA. In January 2009, Majok joined the UConn roster and was eligible to practice with the squad for the remainder of the season, but was not able to play in games. In April 2009, he declared for the 2009 NBA draft but did not sign with an agent. About a week before the draft, he decided to withdraw his name and returned to UConn.

On 20 December 2009, Majok made his debut with the Huskies. He scored one point and collected three rebounds in 16 minutes of action as a starter.

In September 2010, Majok announced that he was leaving Connecticut, though the reasons as to why remain unclear. In 2009–10, he played in 26 games for the Huskies, averaging 2.3 points, 3.0 rebounds and 1.6 blocks per game.

== Professional career ==
=== 2010–11 season ===
In October 2010, Majok signed a two-month deal with FMV Isikspor Istanbul, a 2nd-division Turkish club. He played 7 games for them, averaging 13.9 points, 8.6 rebounds and 3.1 blocks in 28.3 minutes. After his contract expired, he left Turkey.

On 24 December 2010, Majok signed a six-week deal with the Perth Wildcats of the Australian NBL as an injury replacement for Jesse Wagstaff and Matthew Knight. In 8 games for the Wildcats, Majok averaged 7.5 points, 2.8 rebounds and 2.0 blocks per game. Despite his short stint in Perth, Majok became a favourite amongst the Wildcats fans with due to his shot blocking ability, blocking a total of 11 shots in his first three games.

On 12 February 2011, Majok signed with the Gold Coast Blaze for the rest of the 2010–11 season as an injury replacement for Mark Worthington. On 22 March 2011, just days before the Gold Coast's final home game of the 2010–11 NBL season against the Adelaide 36ers, Majok was released by the club so that he could advance his preparations and seek out training-camp opportunities in the United States prior to the 2011 NBA draft. In 6 games for the Blaze, he averaged 2.8 points and 2.3 rebounds per game.

=== 2011–12 season ===
On 23 June 2011, Majok was selected by the Los Angeles Lakers with the 58th overall pick in the 2011 NBA draft. In August 2011, he signed with BK SPU Nitra of Slovakia for the 2011–12 season. In 41 league games for Nitra, he averaged 11.2 points, 8.1 rebounds, 2.6 blocks and 1.4 assists per game.

=== 2012–13 season ===
Majok joined the Los Angeles Lakers for the 2012 NBA Summer League. In 3 games (1 start), he averaged 1.7 points, 4.3 rebounds and 1.3 blocks in 15 minutes per game.

In September 2012, he signed a short-term deal with Maccabi Tel Aviv of Israel but left a month later before appearing in a game for them. In November 2012, he signed with BC Tsmoki-Minsk for the rest of the 2012–13 season. In 13 VTB United League games for Tsmoki-Minsk, he averaged 4.2 points, 4.2 rebounds and 1.1 blocks per game.

=== 2013–14 season ===
On 3 September 2013, Majok signed with KCC Egis of Korea for the 2013–14 season. On 29 October 2013, he was released by Egis after just 12 games. The next day, he signed with Taiwan Beer for the rest of the season. On 12 November 2013, he was released by Taiwan Beer before appearing in a game for them.

On 30 December 2013, he signed with BG Göttingen of Germany for the rest of the season. In 23 games for Göttingen, he averaged 4.3 points and 3.3 rebounds per game.

=== 2014–15 season ===
On 12 December 2014, Majok was acquired by the Los Angeles D-Fenders of the NBA Development League. On 25 February, he was waived by the D-Fenders after suffering a season-ending MCL sprain to his left knee.

=== 2015–16 season ===
On 1 September 2015, Majok signed with Trefl Sopot of the Polish Basketball League. In 27 games for Trefl, he averaged 9.8 points, 7.0 rebounds and 1.8 blocks per game.

In May 2016, Majok joined Beijing Eastern Bucks of the Chinese National Basketball League.

=== 2016–17 season ===
On 21 October 2016, he signed with Homenetmen Beirut of the Lebanese Basketball League. In 2017, he received the Lebanese citizenship and represented Lebanon in the 2017 West Asian Championship.

In June 2017, he signed with the Luoyang Zhonghe of the Chinese National Basketball League. In his first game with Luoyang, Majok recorded 24 points, 20 rebounds and 7 blocks in a 123–138 loss to Anhui Wenyi.

=== 2017–18 season ===
In October 2017, Majok signed with Sagesse Club of the Lebanese Basketball League. In June 2018, Majok signed with Shaanxi Xinda of the Chinese National Basketball League.

=== 2018–19 season ===
Majok signed with Champville SC in Lebanon on August 16, 2018.

=== 2019–20 season ===
On 6 August 2019, Majok signed with the New Zealand Breakers for the 2019–20 NBL season.

=== 2020–21 season ===
On 20 August 2020, Majok signed with Al-Arabi of the Qatari Basketball League.

In February 2020, Majok signed with US Monastir for the 2020 BAL season. The BAL season was however cancelled due to the COVID-19 pandemic. Nevertheless, Majok was on the roster for the 2021 season.

=== 2021–22 season ===
On August 30, 2021, Majok signed with Beirut Club of the Lebanese Basketball League.

In October 2021, Majok returned to Tunisia when he signed with Ezzahra Sports.

On March 2, 2022, Majok was announced to be on the roster of US Monastir for the 2022 BAL season, his second stint with the team and his second appearance in the BAL. He played as an African import due to his South Sudanese heritage. Majok and Monastir won the 2022 BAL Finals and captured the club's first African title. He was named the Defensive Player of the Year and was given a place in the league's All-First Team and All-Defensive Team as well.

In June 2022, Majok joined the Piratas de La Guaira of the Venezuelan SuperLiga.

=== 2022–23 season ===
In March 2023, Majok signed with Angolan club Petro de Luanda, the opponents of Monastir in the previous season's BAL final. He only signed a contract for the BAL, and went on to finish fourth with Petro.

In August 2023, Majok joined Rwandan club Patriots BBC for the remainder of the Rwanda Basketball League (RBL).

=== 2023–24 season ===
In September 2023, Majok joined the Libyan champions Al Ahly Benghazi.

In May 2024, Majok returned to US Monastir for a third stint with the Tunisian champions.

=== 2024–25 season ===
In October 2024, Majok signed with the Kenyan national champions Nairobi City Thunder for the 2024–25 season. Majok joined ASC Ville de Dakar for the main 2025 BAL season, which began in April.

On June 20, 2025, Majok joined Burundian champions Urunani for the playoffs of the Burundian Basketball Championship.

=== 2025–26 season ===
From October to November 2026, Majok played in the 2026 BAL qualification with South Sudanese representative Patriots.

=== NBA draft rights ===
On 7 July 2016, Majok's draft rights were acquired by the Chicago Bulls in exchange for José Calderón and two future second-round draft picks.

On 1 September 2017, Majok's draft rights were traded to the New Orleans Pelicans in exchange for the Chicago Bulls receiving Quincy Pondexter, a 2018 second-round pick, and cash considerations. Majok's right was renounced by the Pelicans on 13 September.

== BAL career statistics ==
Legend
GP	Games played	GS	Games started	MPG	Minutes per game
FG%	Field goal percentage	3P%	3-point field goal percentage	FT%	Free throw percentage
RPG	Rebounds per game	APG	Assists per game	SPG	Steals per game
BPG	Blocks per game	PPG	Points per game	**Bold**	Career high
†	Won an BAL championship

Year	Team	GP	GS	MPG	FG%	3P%	FT%	RPG	APG	SPG	BPG	PPG
2021	Monastir	6	6	24.7	.462	.143	**.812**	6.7	1.0	.5	2.0	8.3
2022†	Monastir	**8**	**8**	31.4	**.613**	.333	.577	**11.0**	1.9	.5	**2.4**	**13.6**
2023	Petro de Luanda	**8**	1	20.9	.522	.000	.696	5.4	2.5	.5	1.8	8.0
2024	Monastir	8	8	30.8	.568	.000	.750	8.8	.8	.8	2.0	8.5
2025	ASC Ville de Dakar	6	6	**33.3**	.545	**.400**	.735	7.8	**3.0**	.8	.8	12.5

== National team career ==
Majok plays internationally for the Lebanon national team. He helped his country win gold at the 2022 Arab Basketball Championship in Dubai.

== Personal life ==
Majok is the son of James Majok and Amer Jacob, and has three brothers, Kachuol, Gurke,Jacob and Majok and two sisters, Agum and Awut. Majok's cousin, Majok Majok, played college basketball for two seasons at Midland College in the National Junior College Athletic Association (NJCAA) before transferring to Ball State University (NCAA) for his junior season. He holds Lebanese and Australian passports.

== Awards and accomplishments ==
=== Club ===
US Monastir

- Basketball Africa League: (2022)
- 4* Championnat National A: (2020, 2021, 2022, 2024)

Shaanxi Xinda

- Chinese NBL: (2018)

Homenetmen Beirut

- Henri Chalhoub Tournament champion: (2017)

BG Göttingen

- ProA: (2014)

Tsmoki-Minsk

- Belarusian Premier League: (2013)
- Belarusian Cup: (2013)

SPU Nitra

- Slovakia Cup: (2012)

=== International ===
Lebanon

- Arab Basketball Championship (gold) gold medal: (2022)

=== Individual ===
- BAL Defensive Player of the Year: (2022)
- All-BAL First Team: (2022)
- 2× BAL All-Defensive Team: (2022, 2023)
- Championnat National A Best Foreign Player: (2020)
- 3× Chinese NBL Defensive Player of the Year: (2016, 2018, 2019)
