= Tunisian Basketball Cup =

- Organising body: Tunisia Basketball Federation
- Founded: 1958; 68 years ago
- First season: 1958–59
- Country: Tunisia
- Confederation: FIBA Africa
- Current champions: Club Africain (8th title) (2025–26)
- Most championships: ES Radès; Stade Nabeulien (12 titles each)

The Tunisian Basketball Cup, is the premier knockout basketball competition in Tunisia, established in 1958. The tournament is organised by the Tunisia Basketball Federation (FTBB).

ES Radès and Stade Nabeulien are the record holders for most titles, with a total of twelve. The current champion is Club Africain, who won the title in the 2025–26 season.

== Champions ==
=== By season ===
- 1958–59: Zitouna Sports (1)
- 1959–60: AS Française (1)
- 1960–61: ES Radès (1)
- 1961–62: ES Radès (2)
- 1962–63: ES Radès (3)
- 1963–64: ES Radès (4)
- 1964–65: ES Radès (5)
- 1965–66: Stade Nabeulien (1)
- 1966–67: Zitouna Sports (2)
- 1967–68: ES Radès (6)
- 1968–69: Zitouna Sports (3)
- 1969–70: ES Radès (7)
- 1970–71: ES Radès (8)
- 1971–72: ES Radès (9)
- 1972–73: Stade Nabeulien (2)
- 1973–74: JA Bougatfa (1)
- 1974–75: CS Cheminots (1)
- 1975–76: CS Cheminots (2)
- 1976–77: ES Tunis (1)
- 1977–78: ES Tunis (2)
- 1978–79: ES Tunis (3)
- 1979–80: Stade Nabeulien (3)
- 1980–81: ES Sahel (1)
- 1981–82: Club Africain (1)
- 1982–83: Sfax RS (1)
- 1983–84: ES Goulettoise (1)
- 1984–85: Ezzahra Sports (1)
- 1985–86: ES Goulettoise (2)
- 1986–87: ES Tunis (4)
- 1987–88: Ezzahra Sports (2)
- 1988–89: ES Tunis (5)
- 1989–90: Stade Nabeulien (4)
- 1990–91: Ezzahra Sports (3)
- 1991–92: ES Goulettoise (3)
- 1992–93: Stade Nabeulien (5)
- 1993–94: ES Tunis (6)
- 1994–95: Ezzahra Sports (4)
- 1995–96: Stade Nabeulien (6)
- 1996–97: Stade Nabeulien (7)
- 1997–98: Ezzahra Sports (5)
- 1998–99: Club Africain (2)
- 1999–00: US Monastir (1)
- 2000–01: Club Africain (3)
- 2001–02: JS Kairouan (1)
- 2002–03: Club Africain (4)
- 2003–04: Stade Nabeulien (8)
- 2004–05: JS Kairouan (2)
- 2005–06: DS Grombalia (1)
- 2006–07: Stade Nabeulien (9)
- 2007–08: Stade Nabeulien (10)
- 2008–09: Stade Nabeulien (11)
- 2009–10: Stade Nabeulien (12)
- 2010–11: ES Sahel (2)
- 2011–12: ES Sahel (3)
- 2012–13: ES Sahel (4)
- 2013–14: Club Africain (5)
- 2014–15: Club Africain (6)
- 2015–16: ES Sahel (5)
- 2016–17: ES Radès (10)
- 2017–18: ES Radès (11)
- 2018–19: ES Radès (12)
- 2019–20: US Monastir (2)
- 2020–21: US Monastir (3)
- 2021–22: US Monastir (4)
- 2022–23: US Monastir (5)
- 2023–24: Club Africain (7)
- 2024–25: US Monastir (6)
- 2025–26: Club Africain (8)

=== By Team ===
Team	City	Titles	Winning seasons
ES Radès	Radès	12	1960–61, 1961–62, 1962–63, 1963–64, 1964–65:, 1967–68, 1969–70, 1970–71, 1971–72, 2016–17, 2017–18, 2018–19
Stade Nabeulien	Nabeul	12	1965–66, 1972–73, 1979–80, 1989–90, 1992–93, 1995–96, 1996–97, 2003–04, 2006–07, 2007–08, 2008–09, 2009–10
Club Africain	Tunis	8	1981–82, 1998–99, 2000–01, 2002–03, 2013–14, 2014–15, 2023–24, 2025–26
US Monastir	Monastir	6	1999–00, 2019–20, 2020–21, 2021–22, 2022–23, 2024–25
ES Tunis	Tunis	6	1976–77, 1977–78, 1978–79, 1986–87, 1988–89, 1993–94
Ezzahra Sport	Ezzahra	5	1984–85, 1987–88, 1990–91, 1994–95, 1997–98
ES Sahel	Sousse	5	1980–81, 2010–11, 2011–12, 2012–13, 2015–16
ES Goulettoise	La Goulette	3	1983–84, 1985–86, 1991–92
Zitouna Sports	Tunis	3	1958–59, 1966–67, 1968–69
JS Kairouan	Kairouan	2	2001–02, 2004–05
CS Cheminots	Tunis	2	1974–75, 1975–76
DS Grombalia	Grombalia	1	2005–06
Sfax RS	Sfax	1	1982–83
JA Bougatfa	Tunis	1	1973–74
AS Française	Tunis	1	1959–60
