= 2021 BAL season rosters =

This page lists the rosters of the 2021 BAL season, the inaugural season of the Basketball Africa League (BAL). Each team features 13 players. On the rosters, a maximum of four foreign players is allowed including maximum two non-African players.

On 14 May 2021, the official rosters were revealed by the BAL. The teams feature 154 players from 24 countries. Ben Uzoh of the Rivers Hoopers is the only player with previous NBA experience, while nine players have played in the NBA G League. A total of 21 players have played collegiate basketball in the NCAA Division I.

== AS Douanes ==
AS Douanes roster
Players
Coaches

Pos.	No.	Nat.	Name	Ht.	Age
PG	00	(Senegal)	Ndour, Alkaly (C)	1.90 m (6 ft 3 in)	28 – 1 January 1998
F	1	(Senegal)	Ndoye, Cheikh Tidiane	1.96 m (6 ft 5 in)	34 – 29 December 1991
SG	2	(Senegal)	Diallo, Bamba	1.93 m (6 ft 4 in)	29 – 15 March 1996
CG	5	(Senegal)	Adams, Louis	1.93 m (6 ft 4 in)	36 – 21 January 1990
SG	10	(Libya)	Sadi, Mohamed (I)	1.94 m (6 ft 4 in)	30 – 8 May 1995
PF	11	(Senegal)	Diop, Bara	2.03 m (6 ft 8 in)	33 – 14 August 1992
G	14	(Senegal)	Faye, Mamadou	1.93 m (6 ft 4 in)	32 – 25 September 1993
PF	15	(Senegal)	Mbaye, Pape	2.03 m (6 ft 8 in)	32 – 23 January 1994
PF	22	(Senegal)	Gueye, Serigne	2.01 m (6 ft 7 in)	34 – 12 January 1992
F	23	(Senegal)	Kamara, Ahmet Cheikh	1.98 m (6 ft 6 in)	32 – 14 February 1994
PF	24	(United States)	Cokley, Chris (I)	2.03 m (6 ft 8 in)	29 – 27 July 1996
C	42	(Egypt)	Attia, Hassan (I)	2.08 m (6 ft 10 in)	32 – 1 January 1994
PF	44	(Senegal)	Gueye, Birahim	2.03 m (6 ft 8 in)	39 – 15 January 1987

Head coach

- (Senegal) Pabi Gueye

Assistant coach(es)

- (Senegal) Alexandre Adams
- (Senegal) Souleymane Diatta

Legend

- (C) Team captain
- (I) Import player
- Injured

- Roster
Updated: 16 May 2021

== AS Salé ==
Note: Flags indicate national team eligibility at FIBA-sanctioned events. Players may hold other non-FIBA nationalities not displayed.

AS Salé roster
Players
Coaches

Pos.	No.	Nat.	Name	Ht.	Age
PG	2	(Morocco)	El Masbahi, Zakaria (C)	1.93 m (6 ft 4 in)	46 – 29 March 1979
G	5	(Morocco)	El Mahsini, Yassine	1.86 m (6 ft 1 in)	32 – 26 October 1993
PG	10	(United States)	James, Ra'Shad (I)	1.85 m (6 ft 1 in)	36 – 26 January 1990
SG	11	(Morocco)	Allal, Chems Eddine	1.96 m (6 ft 5 in)	26 – 15 February 2000
SG	12	(Morocco)	Belhaddar, Mohammed	1.90 m (6 ft 3 in)	31 – 20 February 1994
PF	14	(Morocco)	Jaddi, Hamza	1.99 m (6 ft 6 in)	32 – 25 August 1993
PF	21	(Morocco)	Azouga, Badreddine	2.04 m (6 ft 8 in)	31 – 7 February 1995
PF	24	(Morocco)	Chaoui Kouraichi, Mohammed	2.04 m (6 ft 8 in)	26 – 10 September 1999
C	32	(Central African Republic)	Jefferson, Johndre (I)	2.08 m (6 ft 10 in)	37 – 30 November 1988
C	33	(Morocco)	Kourdou, Soufiane	2.11 m (6 ft 11 in)	40 – 21 May 1985
PG	41	(United States)	Stoglin, Terrell (I)	1.85 m (6 ft 1 in)	34 – 10 November 1991
F/C	44	(Morocco)	Najah, Abderrahim	1.98 m (6 ft 6 in)	41 – 20 November 1984
C	50	(Morocco)	El Ghazi, Adam	2.06 m (6 ft 9 in)	30 – 22 August 1995

Head coach

- (Morocco) Said El Bouzidi

Assistant coach(es)

- (Morocco) Ahmed Salam

Legend

- (C) Team captain
- Injured

- Roster
Updated: May 16, 2021

== AS Police ==
AS Police roster
Players
Coaches

Pos.	No.	Nat.	Name	Ht.	Age
PG	00	(Mali)	Sanogo, Mohamed	1.87 m (6 ft 2 in)	35 – 22 August 1990
PG	1	(Mali)	Samaké, Badra (C)	1.82 m (6 ft 0 in)	27 – 12 December 1998
PG	2	(United States)	Mitchell, Mylo (I)	1.83 m (6 ft 0 in)	28 – 13 May 1997
SF	5	(Mali)	Haidara, Ibrahima Cherif	2.05 m (6 ft 9 in)	33 – 9 October 1992
SG	6	(Mali)	Keita, Mamadou	1.93 m (6 ft 4 in)	33 – 1 February 1993
SG	11	(Mali)	Tandina, Papa	1.94 m (6 ft 4 in)	32 – 18 April 1993
F	12	(Mali)	Diarouma, Benke	1.98 m (6 ft 6 in)	30 – 12 August 1995
SG	15	(Mali)	Kanoute, N'Faly	1.88 m (6 ft 2 in)	29 – 2 December 1996
SG	23	(Mali)	Traoré, Ousmane	1.90 m (6 ft 3 in)	27 – 18 August 1998
PF	24	(Mali)	Ascofaré, Elhadji	1.97 m (6 ft 6 in)	40 – 13 February 1986
C	32	(Senegal)	Thomas, Ibrahima (I)	2.13 m (7 ft 0 in)	39 – 7 February 1987
PF	33	(United States)	Nzeakor, Jawachi (I)	2.03 m (6 ft 8 in)	28 – 13 May 1997
C	34	(Senegal)	Diallo, Ibrahima	2.08 m (6 ft 10 in)	27 – 8 May 1998

Head coach

- (Mali) Boubacar Kanoté

Assistant coach(es)

- (Mali) Kaba Kanté

Legend

- (C) Team captain
- (I) Import player
- Injured

- Roster
Updated: May 16, 2021

== FAP ==
FAP roster
Players
Coaches

Pos.	No.	Nat.	Name	Ht.	Age
PG	1	(Cameroon)	Liale Keumoe, Cyrille	1.79 m (5 ft 10 in)	33 – 10 June 1992
SF	5	(Cameroon)	Tsangue, Cédric	1.95 m (6 ft 5 in)	34 – 21 August 1991
SG	10	(Niger)	Harouna, Abdoulaye (I)	1.96 m (6 ft 5 in)	33 – 12 December 1992
G	11	(United States)	Thomas, Marcus (I)	1.90 m (6 ft 3 in)	30 – 27 July 1995
G/F	15	(Cameroon)	Tametong Kalume, Etienne	1.85 m (6 ft 1 in)	33 – 13 July 1992
G/F	21	(Cameroon)	Kome, Arnold	1.95 m (6 ft 5 in)	33 – 11 September 1992
SF	22	(Cameroon)	Bapoo, Albert	1.95 m (6 ft 5 in)	25 – 2 January 2001
SF	23	(Cameroon)	Essome, Pierre Cedric	1.95 m (6 ft 5 in)	36 – 31 May 1989
PF	24	(Cameroon)	Eyaga, Brice	2.05 m (6 ft 9 in)	27 – 26 October 1998
C	32	(United States)	Hezekiah, Matthew (I)	2.06 m (6 ft 9 in)	33 – 8 August 1992
C	33	(Cameroon)	Ngaransou, Yves-Louis	2.03 m (6 ft 8 in)	31 – 20 October 1994
C	34	(Cameroon)	Nkene, Aziz	2.06 m (6 ft 9 in)	30 – 24 February 1995
PF	41	(Cameroon)	Akumenzoh, Ebaku (C)	2.00 m (6 ft 7 in)	36 – 7 March 1989

Head coach

- (Cameroon) Lazare Adingono

Assistant coach(es)

- (Cameroon) Gilles Bouwe

Legend

- (C) Team captain
- (I) Import player
- Injured

- Roster
Updated: May 16, 2021

== Ferroviário de Maputo ==
Ferroviário de Maputo roster
Players
Coaches

Pos.	No.	Nat.	Name	Ht.	Age
SG	00	(Mozambique)	Macuiana, Muhambi	1.87 m (6 ft 2 in)	25 – 3 November 2000
G	1	(Mozambique)	Chimonzo, Baggio	1.78 m (5 ft 10 in)	33 – 13 December 1992
F	2	(Mozambique)	Martins, Hugo	1.91 m (6 ft 3 in)	30 – 12 March 1995
SF	5	(United States)	Holland, Demarcus (I)	1.93 m (6 ft 4 in)	31 – 2 March 1994
PG	10	(Democratic Republic of the Congo)	Kabongo, Myck (I)	1.91 m (6 ft 3 in)	34 – 12 January 1992
PF	15	(Spain)	Calvo Masa, Álvaro (I)	2.03 m (6 ft 8 in)	42 – 27 March 1983
F	21	(Mozambique)	Caifaz, Milton	2.00 m (6 ft 7 in)	33 – 16 June 1992
SG	22	(Mozambique)	Dinis, Stélio	1.90 m (6 ft 3 in)	32 – 25 November 1993
PF	23	(Mozambique)	Biosse, Yuran	1.89 m (6 ft 2 in)	33 – 2 January 1993
PF	24	(Mozambique)	Muchate, Custódio (C)	1.98 m (6 ft 6 in)	44 – 6 May 1981
PF	32	(Ivory Coast)	Baru, Adjehi (I)	2.06 m (6 ft 9 in)	34 – 12 October 1991
SG	33	(Mozambique)	Uamusse, Manuel	1.92 m (6 ft 4 in)	35 – 15 October 1990
C	34	(Mozambique)	Chire, Inélcio	2.01 m (6 ft 7 in)	34 – 1 June 1991

Head coach

- (Mozambique) Milagre Macome

Assistant coach(es)

- (Mozambique) Marti Mas Zamora

Legend

- (C) Team captain
- (I) Import player
- Injured

- Roster
Updated: 16 May 2021

== GNBC ==
GNBC roster
Players
Coaches

Pos.	No.	Nat.	Name	Ht.	Age
C	00	(Madagascar)	Solondrainy, Alpha	1.98 m (6 ft 6 in)	30 – 4 May 1995
SG	1	(Madagascar)	Randriamampionona, Elly	1.88 m (6 ft 2 in)	28 – 20 July 1997
PG	2	(Madagascar)	Sen Chan, Zico	1.80 m (5 ft 11 in)	27 – 30 January 1999
PG	5	(Madagascar)	Razanamahenina, Kiady	1.84 m (6 ft 0 in)	29 – 15 December 1996
SG	7	(Madagascar)	Ramorasata, Ndranto	1.74 m (5 ft 9 in)	36 – 27 May 1989
PG	8	(Madagascar)	Ralison, Andriantsara	1.74 m (5 ft 9 in)	35 – 11 August 1990
F	11	(Madagascar)	Mory, Francis (C)	1.93 m (6 ft 4 in)	34 – 4 April 1991
C	12	(Madagascar)	Chanel, Chancy	1.93 m (6 ft 4 in)	40 – 25 January 1986
C	15	(Madagascar)	Rasolomanana, Anthony	1.98 m (6 ft 6 in)	28 – 2 May 1997
C	21	(Madagascar)	Loubacky, Rick-Ley	1.98 m (6 ft 6 in)	29 – 27 December 1996
G	23	(Madagascar)	Mandimbison, Constant	1.95 m (6 ft 5 in)	35 – 22 August 1990
C	55	(United States)	Ridley, Cameron (I)	2.06 m (6 ft 9 in)	32 – 27 October 1993

Head coach

- (Madagascar) Lova Navalona Raharidera

Assistant coach(es)

- (Madagascar) Daniel Rabearimanana

Legend

- (C) Team captain
- (I) Import player
- Injured

- Roster
Updated: 16 May 2020

== GS Pétroliers ==
GS Pétroliers roster
Players
Coaches

Pos.	No.	Nat.	Name	Ht.	Age
PG	1	(Algeria)	Guermate, Mohamed Zaki	1.78 m (5 ft 10 in)	32 – 7 September 1993
PG	5	(Algeria)	Bourkaib, Merouane	1.80 m (5 ft 11 in)	34 – 9 February 1992
G	15	(Algeria)	Boutiba, Ahmed	1.90 m (6 ft 3 in)	30 – 22 December 1995
PG	21	(Algeria)	Belkhodja, Fayçal	1.92 m (6 ft 4 in)	38 – 3 February 1988
PF	22	(Algeria)	Belkacemi, Nadjem	1.90 m (6 ft 3 in)	39 – 3 February 1987
F	24	(Algeria)	Aggoun, Oussama	1.97 m (6 ft 6 in)	31 – 10 May 1994
G	32	(Algeria)	Benayad-Cherif, Hicham	1.98 m (6 ft 6 in)	35 – 24 February 1990
G	33	(Algeria)	Dekkiche, Abdesslem	1.96 m (6 ft 5 in)	40 – 7 February 1986
PF	34	(Algeria)	Hamdini, Abdellah	2.00 m (6 ft 7 in)	34 – 11 January 1992
C	41	(Algeria)	Ghezzoul, Touhami	2.11 m (6 ft 11 in)	39 – 5 January 1987
PF	42	(Algeria)	Harat, Mohamed	2.00 m (6 ft 7 in)	35 – 9 June 1990
C	50	(Algeria)	Adrar, Mustapha (C)	2.02 m (6 ft 8 in)	43 – 12 April 1982
C	55	(Algeria)	Seddik Touati, Mohamed	2.15 m (7 ft 1 in)	39 – 25 January 1987

Head coach

- (Algeria) Soufiane Boulahia

Assistant coach(es)

- (Algeria) Faradjellah Harrouni
- (Algeria) Mohamed Krideche

Legend

- (C) Team captain
- (I) Import player
- Injured

- Roster
Updated: 16 May 2021

== Patriots ==
Patriots BBC roster
Players
Coaches

Pos.	No.	Nat.	Name	Ht.	Age
PG	2	(Rwanda)	Mugabe, Aristide (C)	1.83 m (6 ft 0 in)	38 – 11 February 1988
PG	5	(Rwanda)	Sagamba, Sedard	1.85 m (6 ft 1 in)	36 – 1 January 1990
PG	10	(Rwanda)	Sano, Gasana	1.93 m (6 ft 4 in)	26 – 4 September 1999
PG	11	(Rwanda)	Nshobozwabyosenumukiza, Wilson	1.83 m (6 ft 0 in)	27 – 26 June 1998
SG	12	(Rwanda)	Gasana, Kenny	1.91 m (6 ft 3 in)	41 – 9 November 1984
PF	14	(Kenya)	Wamukota, Bush (I)	2.06 m (6 ft 9 in)	32 – 28 September 1993
SG	15	(United States)	Cole, Jermaine (I)	1.88 m (6 ft 2 in)	41 – 28 January 1985
SG	22	(Rwanda)	Ndizeye, Dieudonné	1.98 m (6 ft 6 in)	29 – 14 October 1996
SG	23	(Rwanda)	Hagumintwari, Steve	1.93 m (6 ft 4 in)	32 – 1 October 1993
C	24	(Rwanda)	Ndoli, Jean-Paul	2.03 m (6 ft 8 in)	30 – 30 April 1995
C	32	(Rwanda)	Ibeh, Prince	2.06 m (6 ft 9 in)	31 – 3 June 1994
PF	33	(United States)	Costner, Brandon (I)	2.01 m (6 ft 7 in)	38 – 21 July 1987
C	34	(Rwanda)	Kaje, Elie	1.91 m (6 ft 3 in)	30 – 17 March 1995

Head coach

- (United States) Alan Major

Assistant coach(es)

- (Kenya) Bernard Oluoch
- (Burundi) Olivier Ndayiragije
- (Democratic Republic of the Congo) Emmanuel Mavomo

Legend

- (C) Team captain
- (I) Import player
- Injured

- Roster
Updated: 16 May 2021

== Petro de Luanda ==
Petro de Luanda roster
Players
Coaches

Pos.	No.	Nat.	Name	Ht.	Age
PG	1	(Angola)	Domingos, Gerson	1.78 m (5 ft 10 in)	29 – 16 April 1996
PG	5	(Angola)	Dundão, Childe	1.67 m (5 ft 6 in)	27 – 17 May 1998
G	12	(United States)	Scott, Antwan (I)	1.85 m (6 ft 1 in)	33 – 28 February 1992
C	21	(Angola)	Pedro, Jone	2.08 m (6 ft 10 in)	43 – 4 September 1982
SG	22	(Angola)	Gonçalves, Gerson	1.93 m (6 ft 4 in)	29 – 29 March 1996
C	23	(Angola)	João, Aldemiro	2.07 m (6 ft 9 in)	32 – 8 July 1993
SF	24	(Angola)	António, José	1.96 m (6 ft 5 in)	35 – 31 July 1990
SG	32	(Angola)	Cipriano, Olímpio	1.94 m (6 ft 4 in)	43 – 4 September 1982
SG	33	(Angola)	Morais, Carlos	1.92 m (6 ft 4 in)	40 – 16 October 1985
SF	34	(Angola)	Paulo, Leonel (C)	1.97 m (6 ft 6 in)	39 – 30 April 1986
C	41	(Angola)	Joaquim, Valdelício	2.08 m (6 ft 10 in)	35 – 15 April 1990
C	54	(United Kingdom)	Richards, Ryan (I)	2.12 m (6 ft 11 in)	43 – 4 September 1982

Head coach

- (Brazil) José Neto

Assistant coach(es)

- (Angola) Anibal Moreira

Team manager

- (Angola) Artur Barros

Legend

- (C) Team captain
- (I) Import player
- Injured

- Roster
Updated: 16 May 2021

== Rivers Hoopers ==
Rivers Hoopers roster
Players
Coaches

Pos.	No.	Nat.	Name	Ht.	Age
G	00	(Nigeria)	Balogun, Emmanuel	1.85 m (6 ft 1 in)	27 – 17 December 1998
SG	2	(Nigeria)	Alalibo, Ronald	1.83 m (6 ft 0 in)	31 – 8 May 1994
F	10	(Nigeria)	Nwaiwu, Onyebuchi	2.01 m (6 ft 7 in)	27 – 20 August 1998
C	11	(Nigeria)	Koko, Victor Anthony	2.08 m (6 ft 10 in)	28 – 4 June 1997
PF	12	(Nigeria)	Ajegbeyi, Solomon	2.06 m (6 ft 9 in)	30 – 2 November 1995
PG	14	(Nigeria)	Uzoh, Ben	1.91 m (6 ft 3 in)	37 – 18 March 1988
SG	15	(Uganda)	Opong, Robinson (I)	1.91 m (6 ft 3 in)	36 – 10 May 1989
SF	21	(Nigeria)	Osigbodi, Precious	2.01 m (6 ft 7 in)	30 – 7 July 1995
SG	22	(Nigeria)	Ikechukwu, Benjamin (C)	1.98 m (6 ft 6 in)	28 – 4 June 1997
C	23	(Nigeria)	Ugo, Victor James	2.08 m (6 ft 10 in)	33 – 14 December 1992
SF	24	(United States)	Sullivan, Taren (I)	1.98 m (6 ft 6 in)	30 – 30 July 1995
SG	33	(Nigeria)	Owoicho, Simon	1.91 m (6 ft 3 in)	30 – 23 November 1995
C	55	(United States)	Daniels, Chris (I)	2.08 m (6 ft 10 in)	41 – 19 April 1984

Head coach

- (Nigeria) Ogoh Odaudu

Assistant coach(es)

- (Nigeria) Johnson Orupabo
- (Nigeria) Wilkinson Suobo

Legend

- (C) Team captain
- (I) Import player
- Injured

- Roster
Updated: 16 May 2021

== US Monastir ==
US Monastir roster
Players
Coaches

Pos.	No.	Nat.	Name	Ht.	Age
PG	00	(Tunisia)	Abada, Omar	1.88 m (6 ft 2 in)	32 – 20 April 1993
SG	1	(Tunisia)	Jaziri, Neji	1.89 m (6 ft 2 in)	31 – 21 October 1994
SG	8	(United States)	Crawford, Chris (I)	1.93 m (6 ft 4 in)	33 – 30 September 1992
PF	5	(Tunisia)	El Mabrouk, Mourad	1.88 m (6 ft 2 in)	39 – 19 October 1986
CG	10	(Lebanon)	Arakji, Wael (I)	1.93 m (6 ft 4 in)	31 – 4 September 1994
SG	11	(Tunisia)	Marnaoui, Oussama	1.93 m (6 ft 4 in)	26 – 16 June 1999
F	15	(Tunisia)	Slimane, Radhouane (C)	2.05 m (6 ft 9 in)	45 – 16 August 1980
C	21	(Sudan)	Majok, Ater (I)	2.08 m (6 ft 10 in)	38 – 4 July 1987
G/F	22	(Tunisia)	Bhouri, Eskander	1.90 m (6 ft 3 in)	28 – 12 July 1997
SF	23	(Tunisia)	Lahyani, Firas	2.01 m (6 ft 7 in)	34 – 19 July 1991
C	24	(Tunisia)	Ben Romdhane, Makrem	2.06 m (6 ft 9 in)	36 – 27 March 1989
G/F	32	(Tunisia)	Ghyaza, Mokhtar	2.05 m (6 ft 9 in)	39 – 15 November 1986
F	34	(Tunisia)	Methnani, Wassef	1.98 m (6 ft 6 in)	27 – 7 August 1998

Head coach

- (Tunisia) Mounir Ben Slimen

Assistant coach(es)

- (Tunisia) Safouene Ferjani
- (Tunisia) Mohamed Gaddour

Legend

- (C) Team captain
- (I) Import player
- Injured

- Roster
Updated: 16 May 2021

== Zamalek ==
Zamalek roster
Players
Coaches

Pos.	No.	Nat.	Name	Ht.	Age
PG	00	(United States Virgin Islands)	Hodge, Walter (I)	1.83 m (6 ft 0 in)	39 – 21 September 1986
PG	1	(Ivory Coast)	Diabate, Mouloukou (I)	1.83 m (6 ft 0 in)	38 – 21 July 1987
PG	2	(Egypt)	Abdalatif, Mohab	1.93 m (6 ft 4 in)	23 – 7 June 2002
PF	10	(Egypt)	Osama Mahmoud, Anas	2.13 m (7 ft 0 in)	30 – 9 May 1995
SG	12	(Egypt)	Salem, Islam	1.91 m (6 ft 3 in)	36 – 20 March 1989
PG	14	(Egypt)	Hatem, Ahmed	1.91 m (6 ft 3 in)	30 – 2 September 1995
SG	15	(Egypt)	Hesham, Omar	1.91 m (6 ft 3 in)	30 – 29 March 1995
F	23	(Egypt)	Yasser, Ahmed	1.98 m (6 ft 6 in)	24 – 18 June 2001
PF	24	(Nigeria)	Fakuade, Michael (I)	2.01 m (6 ft 7 in)	36 – 18 February 1989
F	41	(Egypt)	El-Saharty, Haytham (C)	1.96 m (6 ft 5 in)	40 – 26 August 1985
C	42	(Nigeria)	Elonu, Chinemelu (I)	2.08 m (6 ft 10 in)	38 – 11 March 1987
F	44	(Egypt)	Meshaal, Mostafa	1.96 m (6 ft 5 in)	39 – 11 March 1986
PF	50	(Egypt)	Kejo, Mostafa	2.03 m (6 ft 8 in)	31 – 24 October 1994

Head coach

- (Spain) Augustí Julbe

Assistant coach(es)

- (Egypt) Samir Gouda
- (Egypt) Yaser Mohamed

Legend

- (C) Team captain
- (I) Import player
- Injured

- Roster
Updated: May 15, 2021
