= 2020–21 AS Douanes season =

AS Douanes
2020–21 season
- Head coach: Pabi Guèye
- Nationale 1: Runners-up (lost to DUC)
- Basketball Africa League: Quarter-finalist (eliminated by Monastir)
- Senegalese Cup: Winners

The 2020–21 season of AS Douanes was the 1st season for the club in the Basketball Africa League. The team began the season on 17 May 2021, in its season opener against Algeria's GS Pétroliers.

The Douanes entered the season directly as champions of the Nationale 1 and were placed in Group B. The team advanced past the group phase as a lucky loser and qualified for the 2021 BAL Playoffs as seventh-seed. In the quarterfinals, later to be finalist US Monastir easily eliminated Douanes.

The most remarkable players of the team were Mamadou Faye and Bara Diop, who made their debut at the international stage and would later be called up for the Senegal national basketball team.

== Roster ==
=== Team ===
AS Douanes roster
Players
Coaches

Pos.	No.	Nat.	Name	Ht.	Age
PG	00	(Senegal)	Ndour, Alkaly (C)	1.90 m (6 ft 3 in)	28 – 1 January 1998
F	1	(Senegal)	Ndoye, Cheikh Tidiane	1.96 m (6 ft 5 in)	34 – 29 December 1991
SG	2	(Senegal)	Diallo, Bamba	1.93 m (6 ft 4 in)	30 – 15 March 1996
PG	5	(Senegal)	Adams, Louis	1.93 m (6 ft 4 in)	36 – 21 January 1990
SG	10	(Libya)	Sadi, Mohamed (I)	1.94 m (6 ft 4 in)	31 – 8 May 1995
PF	11	(Senegal)	Diop, Bara	2.03 m (6 ft 8 in)	34 – 14 August 1992
G	14	(Senegal)	Faye, Mamadou	1.93 m (6 ft 4 in)	32 – 25 September 1993
PF	15	(Senegal)	Mbaye, Pape	2.03 m (6 ft 8 in)	32 – 23 January 1994
PF	22	(Senegal)	Gueye, Serigne	2.01 m (6 ft 7 in)	34 – 12 January 1992
F	23	(Senegal)	Kamara, Ahmet Cheikh	1.98 m (6 ft 6 in)	32 – 14 February 1994
PF	24	(United States)	Cokley, Chris (I)	2.03 m (6 ft 8 in)	30 – 27 July 1996
C	42	(Egypt)	Attia, Hassan (I)	2.08 m (6 ft 10 in)	32 – 1 January 1994
PF	44	(Senegal)	Gueye, Birahim	2.03 m (6 ft 8 in)	39 – 15 January 1987

Head coach

- (Senegal) Pabi Guèye

Assistant coach(es)

- (Senegal) Alexandre Adams
- (Senegal) Souleymane Diatta

Legend

- (C) Team captain
- (I) Import player
- Injured

- Roster
Updated: 15 May 2021

=== Additions ===
No.	Pos.	Nat.	Name	Moving from		Date	Source
2	SG	(Senegal)	Bamba Diallo	American	(United States)	May 2021	
10	SG	(Libya)	Mohamed Sadi	Al-Nasr Benghazi	(Libya)	April 28, 2021	
42	C	(Egypt)	Hassan Attia	None		May 2021	
5	PG	(Senegal)	Louis Adams	Tormes	(Spain)	February 2020	
24	PF	(United States)	Chris Cokley	AB Contern	(Luxembourg)	April 26, 2021	

== BAL ==
=== Group phase ===
Pos	Team	Pld	W	L	PF	PA	PD	Pts	Qualification
1	(Egypt) Zamalek	3	3	0	254	181	+73	6	Advance to playoffs
2	(Mozambique) Ferroviário de Maputo	3	2	1	229	218	+11	5	Advance to playoffs
3	(Senegal) AS Douanes	3	1	2	230	250	−20	4	Advance to playoffs
4	(Algeria) GS Pétroliers	3	0	3	213	277	−64	3	

Source: BAL

2021 game log
Total: 1–2
Group Phase

Game	Date	Team	Score	High points	High rebounds	High assists	Location Attendance	Record
1	17 May	(Algeria); GS Pétroliers	W 94–76	Bara Diop (17)	Bara Diop (9)	Mamadou Faye (7)	Kigali Arena; 607	1–0
2	18 May	(Mozambique); Ferroviário de Maputo	L 88–74	Mamadou Faye (15)	Bamba Diallo (7)	Mamadou Faye (5)	Kigali Arena; 508	1–1
3	19 May	(Egypt); Zamalek	L 62–82	Bara Diop (14)	Bara Diop (9)	Alkaly Ndour (4)	Kigali Arena; N/A	1–2

=== Playoffs ===
2021 playoff game log
Total: 0–1
Quarter-finals

Game	Date	Team	Score	High points	High rebounds	High assists	Location Attendance	Record
Quarter-finals	27 May	(Tunisia); US Monastir	L 86–62	Bamba Diallo (15)	Bara Diop (5)	Mamadou Faye (5)	Kigali Arena; 643	N/A

== Statistics ==
Legend
GP	Games played	GS	Games started	MPG	Minutes per game	RPG	Rebounds per game
APG	Assists per game	SPG	Steals per game	BPG	Blocks per game	PPG	Points per game
FG%	Field-goal percentage	3P%	3-point field-goal percentage	FT%	Free-throw percentage	TO	Turnovers per game
PF	Fouls per game		Team leader		League leader

Player	GP	MPG	FG%	3P%	FT%	RPG	APG	SPG	BPG	PPG
Mamadou Faye	4	24.1	.488	.471	.692	4.0	5.5	0.8	0.0	14.8
Bara Diop	4	31.4	.465	.357	.500	7.2	1.5	2.5	1.2	12.2
Bamba Diallo	4	20.7	.410	.435	.833	3.0	1.0	1.8	0.0	11.8
Hassan Attia	4	16.3	.462	.000	.250	3.0	0.2	1.2	1.0	6.2
Serigne Gueye	4	13.6	.320	.333	.833	0.5	0.5	0.0	0.0	6.2
Pape Mbaye	2	20.0	.571	.667	.000	2.5	0.0	1.0	0.5	6.0
Chris Cokley	4	17.1	.375	.333	.667	3.2	2.0	1.0	0.0	5.8
Cheikh Ahmet Kamara	4	29.2	.259	.000	.750	4.2	1.0	0.8	0.0	4.2
Louis Adams	1	7.3	.333	.000	.000	1.0	0.0	0.0	0.0	4.0
Cheikh Tidiane Ndoye	2	12.7	.600	.000	1.000	2.5	2.0	0.5	0.5	4.0
Alkaly Ndour	4	17.2	.353	.200	.500	2.8	4.2	1.2	0.0	3.8
Birahim Gaye	1	6.3	.200	.000	.000	0.0	0.0	0.0	0.0	2.0
Mohamed Sadi	4	10.7	.188	.000	.000	1.8	0.5	0.8	0.0	1.5
