= 2020–21 US Monastir basketball season =

US Monastir
2020–21 season
- Chairman: Ahmed Belli
- Head coach: Safouene Ferjani (CNA); Mounir Ben Slimen (BAL)
- Arena: Mohamed-Mzali Sports Hall
- Championnat National A: Champions
- Basketball Africa League: Runners-up (lost to Zamalek)
- Tunisian Cup: Winners

The 2020–21 season was the 62nd season of the US Monastir men's basketball team and the 1st of the team in the Basketball Africa League (BAL).

On 27 April 2021, Monastir won its sixth Championnat National A championship, its third consecutive title in a row. In its debut season in the Basketball Africa League, the team dominated its way through the regular season, defeating all three opponents by a wide margin. After blowouts in the quarter- and semifinals, Monastir lost to Zamalek in the 2021 BAL Finals.

== Roster ==
=== Championnat National A roster ===
The following was Monastir's roster for the 2020–21 Championnat National A season, led by head coach Safouane Ferjani.

US Monastir roster
Players
Coaches

Pos.	No.	Nat.	Name	Ht.	Age
SG	1	(Tunisia)	Marnaoui, Oussama	1.93 m (6 ft 4 in)	27 – 16 June 1999
PG	3	(Dominican Republic)	Quezada, Manny	1.91 m (6 ft 3 in)	41 – 13 April 1985
PG	4	(Tunisia)	Abada, Omar	1.88 m (6 ft 2 in)	33 – 20 April 1993
G/F	4	(Tunisia)	Bhouri, Eskander	1.90 m (6 ft 3 in)	29 – 12 July 1997
F	5	(Tunisia)	Methnani, Wassef	1.98 m (6 ft 6 in)	28 – 7 August 1998
SG	8	(Tunisia)	Jaziri, Neji	1.89 m (6 ft 2 in)	32 – 21 October 1994
F	9	(Tunisia)	Nasr, Hassen		27 – 27 August 1999
C	11	(Tunisia)	Med, Mokhtar	2.04 m (6 ft 8 in)	35 – 14 November 1990
C	12	(Tunisia)	Ben Romdhane, Makrem	2.06 m (6 ft 9 in)	37 – 27 March 1989
F	15	(Tunisia)	Slimane, Radhouane (C)	2.05 m (6 ft 9 in)	46 – 16 August 1980
SF	23	(Tunisia)	Lahyani, Firas	2.01 m (6 ft 7 in)	35 – 19 July 1991
PG	25	(Tunisia)	Jaziri, Bilel	1.92 m (6 ft 4 in)	28 – 25 March 1998
G/F	32	(Tunisia)	Ghyaza, Mokhtar	2.05 m (6 ft 9 in)	39 – 15 November 1986

Head coach

- (Tunisia) Safouene Ferjani

Legend

- (C) Team captain
- (I) Import player
- Injured

- Roster
Updated: 16 May 2021

=== BAL roster ===
The following was US Monastir's 13-man roster for the 2021 BAL season.

US Monastir roster
Players
Coaches

Pos.	No.	Nat.	Name	Ht.	Age
PG	00	(Tunisia)	Abada, Omar	1.88 m (6 ft 2 in)	33 – 20 April 1993
SG	1	(Tunisia)	Jaziri, Neji	1.89 m (6 ft 2 in)	32 – 21 October 1994
SG	8	(United States)	Crawford, Chris (I)	1.93 m (6 ft 4 in)	34 – 30 September 1992
PF	5	(Tunisia)	El Mabrouk, Mourad	1.88 m (6 ft 2 in)	40 – 19 October 1986
CG	10	(Lebanon)	Arakji, Wael (I)	1.93 m (6 ft 4 in)	32 – 4 September 1994
SG	11	(Tunisia)	Marnaoui, Oussama	1.93 m (6 ft 4 in)	27 – 16 June 1999
F	15	(Tunisia)	Slimane, Radhouane (C)	2.05 m (6 ft 9 in)	46 – 16 August 1980
C	21	(South Sudan)	Majok, Ater (I)	2.08 m (6 ft 10 in)	39 – 4 July 1987
G/F	22	(Tunisia)	Bhouri, Eskander	1.90 m (6 ft 3 in)	29 – 12 July 1997
SF	23	(Tunisia)	Lahyani, Firas	2.01 m (6 ft 7 in)	35 – 19 July 1991
C	24	(Tunisia)	Ben Romdhane, Makrem	2.06 m (6 ft 9 in)	37 – 27 March 1989
G/F	32	(Tunisia)	Ghyaza, Mokhtar	2.05 m (6 ft 9 in)	39 – 15 November 1986
F	34	(Tunisia)	Methnani, Wassef	1.98 m (6 ft 6 in)	28 – 7 August 1998

Head coach

- (Tunisia) Mounir Ben Slimane

Assistant coach(es)

- (Tunisia) Safouene Ferjani
- (Tunisia) Mohamed Gaddour

Legend

- (C) Team captain
- (I) Import player
- Injured

- Roster
Updated: 16 May 2021

== Championnat National A ==
=== Regular season ===
19 December 2020 RS1	AS Hammamet	62–84	US Monastir	Hammamet
				Arena: Salle d'Hammamet

23 December 2020 RS2	Kairouan	70–74	US Monastir	Kairouan
				Arena: Salle Kairouan

26 December 2020 RS3	US Monastir	74–48	Étoile Sportive La Goulette	Monastir
				Arena: Mohamed-Mzali Sports Hall

30 December 2020 RS4	US Ansar	41–72	US Monastir	Dar Chaâbane

24 January 2021 RS5	Club Africain	64–55	US Monastir	Tunis

28 January 2021 RS6	US Monastir	100–68	AS Hammamet	Monastir
				Arena: Mohamed-Mzali Sports Hall

3 February 2021 RS7	Étoile Sportive La Goulette	58–92	US Monastir	La Goulette

26 December 2020 RS7	US Monastir	90–67	US Ansar	Monastir
				Arena: Mohamed-Mzali Sports Hall

26 December 2020 RS8	US Monastir	88–75	JS Kariouan	Monastir
				Arena: Mohamed-Mzali Sports Hall

=== Play-offs ===
6 March 2021 1	Ezzahra Sports	75–79	US Monastir	Ezzahra
				Arena: Ezzahra Arena

26 March 2021 2	US Monastir	80–75	Ezzahra Sports	Monastir
				Arena: Mohamed-Mzali Sports Hall

6 April 2021 3	US Monastir	67–62	JS Kairouan	Monastir
				Arena: Mohamed-Mzali Sports Hall

8 April 2021 4	Ezzahra Sports	68–62	US Monastir	Ezzahra
				Arena: Ezzahra Arena

10 April 2021 5	US Monastir	79–64	ES Radès	Monastir
				Arena: Mohamed-Mzali Sports Hall

12 April 2021 6	US Monastir	74–61	Stade Nabeulien	Monastir
				Arena: Mohamed-Mzali Sports Hall

=== Semifinals ===
15 April 2021 Game 1	US Monastir	77–58	Stade Nabeulien	Monastir
				Arena: Mohamed-Mzali Sports Hall

17 April 2021 Game 2	Stade Nabeulien	68–79	US Monastir	Nabeul
				Arena: Salle Bir Challouf

=== Finals ===
25 April 2021 Game 1	US Monastir	86–79	Ezzahra Sports	Monastir
				Arena: Mohamed-Mzali Sports Hall

27 April 2021 Game 2	Ezzahra Sports	75–77	US Monastir	Monastir
				Arena: Mohamed-Mzali Sports Hall

== Tunisian Cup ==
=== Final ===
1 May 2021	US Monastir	104–61	Club Africain	Sfax
				Arena: Raed Bejaoui Indoor Sports Complex

== Basketball Africa League ==
=== Group phase ===
Pos	Team	Pld	W	L	PF	PA	PD	Pts	Qualification
1	(Tunisia) US Monastir	3	3	0	303	211	+92	6	Advance to playoffs
2	(Rwanda) Patriots (H)	3	2	1	236	223	+13	5	Advance to playoffs
3	(Nigeria) Rivers Hoopers	3	1	2	210	251	−41	4	
4	(Madagascar) GNBC	3	0	3	207	271	−64	3	

Source: BAL
(H) Hosts

==== Games ====
17 May 2021 1	GNBC (Madagascar)	66–113	(Tunisia) US Monastir	Kigali
19:00 GMT	Scoring by quarter: 13–23, 19–25, 11–30, 23–25
	Pts: Randriamampionona 26; Rebs: Mandimbison 4 Asts: Razanamahenina 7	Boxscore	Pts: Ben Romdhane 23; Rebs: Ben Romdhane 10; Asts: Crawford 8	Arena: Kigali Arena; Attendance: 498

20 May 2021 2	Rivers Hoopers (Nigeria)	70–99	(Tunisia) US Monastir	Kigali
15:30 GMT	Scoring by quarter: 12–24, 10–25, 25–21, 23–29
	Pts: Daniels 25; Rebs: Daniels 11; Asts: Uzoh 8	Boxscore	Pts: Slimane 23; Rebs: Ghayaza, Lahyani, Majok 6 Asts: Abada 6	Arena: Kigali Arena

22 May 2021 3	US Monastir (Tunisia)	91–75	(Rwanda) Patriots	Kigali
14:00 GMT	Scoring by quarter: 24-20, 22-24, 22-14, 23-17
	Pts: Arakji 28; Rebs: Ben Romdhane 10; Asts: Slimane 6	Boxscore	Pts: Gasana 22; Rebs: Costner 6 Asts: Gasana 8	Arena: Kigali Arena; Attendance: 1141

=== Playoffs ===
==== Quarterfinals ====
27 May 2021	US Monastir (Tunisia)	86–62	(Senegal) AS Douanes	Kigali
17:30 GMT	Scoring by quarter: 19–16, 29–18, 18–13, 20–15
	Pts: Majok 17; Rebs: Slimane 9 Asts: Abada 8	Boxscore	Pts: Diallo 15; Rebs: Diop 5 Asts: Faye 6	Arena: Kigali Arena; Attendance: 643

==== Semifinals ====
29 May 2021	US Monastir (Tunisia)	87–46	(Rwanda) Patriots	Kigali
17:30 GMT	Scoring by quarter: 16-14, 21-8, 28-11, 22-13
	Pts: Abada 18; Rebs: Majok 12; Asts: Abada 5	Boxscore	Pts: Ndizeye 13; Rebs: Wamokota 10; Asts: 5 players 2	Arena: Kigali Arena

==== Finals ====
30 May 2021	US Monastir (Tunisia)	63–76	(Egypt) Zamalek	Kigali
14:00 GMT	Scoring by quarter: 22–17, 20–27, 9–11, 12–21
	Pts: Ben Romdhane & Crawford 14; Rebs: Ben Romdhane 10; Asts: Abada 5 PIR: Three players 12	Report	Pts: Fakuade 15; Rebs: Elonu 12; Asts: Diabate 6 PIR: Elonu 22	Arena: Kigali Arena; Attendance: 1,789; Referees: Samir Abaakil (Morocco), Marie Leslie Cherubin (Mauritius), Kingsley Ojeaburu (Nigeria)

== Individual awards ==
- BAL Sportsmanship Award: Makrem Ben Romdhane
- All-BAL First Team:
  - Omar Abada
  - Wael Arakji
  - Makrem Ben Romdhane

== Statistics ==
Legend
GP	Games played	GS	Games started	MPG	Minutes per game	RPG	Rebounds per game
APG	Assists per game	SPG	Steals per game	BPG	Blocks per game	PPG	Points per game
FG%	Field-goal percentage	3P%	3-point field-goal percentage	FT%	Free-throw percentage	TO	Turnovers per game
PF	Fouls per game		Team leader		League leader

Player	GP	GS	MPG	FG%	3P%	FT%	RPG	APG	SPG	BPG	PPG
Wael Arakji	6	0	18.0	65.4%	33.3%	88.9%	2.3	3.2	1.2	0.0	14.7
Chris Crawford	6	0	24.1	47.8%	41.0%	50.0%	3.0	3.7	1.3	0.2	14.0
Makrem Ben Romdhane	6	6	28.4	61.1%	41.7%	33.3%	7.3	3.8	1.3	0.3	13.2
Omar Abada	6	6	27.6	40.0%	31.2%	70.8%	3.2	5.2	2.0	0.3	11.0
Radhouane Slimane	6	6	22.4	48.8%	48.1%	81.8%	4.0	2.7	0.5	0.0	10.3
Ater Majok	6	6	24.7	46.2%	14.3%	81.2%	6.7	1.0	0.5	2.0	8.3
Mourad El Mabrouk	6	6	23.7	28.6%	30.3%	100.0%	2.3	2.5	1.0	0.3	6.0
Oussama Marnaoui	4	0	5.9	45.5%	33.3%	76.9%	1.0	0.0	0.5	0.2	5.2
Firas Lahyani	5	0	12.2	57.9%	0.0%	75.0%	3.2	1.0	0.6	0.2	5.0
Mokhtar Ghyaza	6	0	14.0	44.4%	0.0%	81.8%	2.8	0.7	2.0	0.7	4.2
Naji Jaziri	2	0	3.0	33.3%	33.3%	0.0%	1.0	0.0	0.5	0.0	1.5
Eskander Bhouri	3	0	4.0	0.0%	0.0%	0.0%	0.3	1.3	0.3	0.0	0.0
