= List of 2021 BAL season transactions =

This is a list of transactions that have taken place before and during the 2020 BAL season, the inaugural season of the Basketball Africa League (BAL).

== Transactions ==
=== To BAL ===
Date	Player	From	To	Ref.
7 December	(United States) Andre Washington	(Bahrain) Al Hala	(Tunisia) US Monastir	
4 January	(United States) Chris Crawford	(Lebanon) Homenetmen Beirut	(Tunisia) US Monastir	
27 January	(Senegal) Louis Adams	(Spain) CB Tormes	(Senegal) AS Douanes	
27 January	(Senegal) Bara Diop	(Senegal) DUC	(Senegal) AS Douanes	
27 January	(Senegal) Lamine Badji	(Senegal) JA	(Senegal) AS Douanes	
27 January	(Senegal) Papa Gora Gaye	Free agent	(Senegal) AS Douanes	
21 February	(United States) Michael Taylor	(Libya) Al-Nasr	(Egypt) Zamalek	
21 February	(United States) Demarius Bolds	(Lebanon) Atlas Ferzol	(Algeria) GS Pétroliers	
23 February	(Ghana) Alhaji Mohammed	(Romania) U-BT Cluj-Napoca	(Tunisia) US Monastir	
23 February	(United States) Terrell Stoglin	(Egypt) Zamalek	(Morocco) AS Salé	
24 February	(United States) Tony Mitchell	(Uruguay) Aguada	(Morocco) AS Salé	
25 February	(United States) Kaylon Tappin	(Sweden) Svendborg Rabbits	(Nigeria) Rivers Hoopers	
26 February	(United States) Billy Baptist	Free agent	(Nigeria) Rivers Hoopers	
26 February	(Egypt) Ahmed Hamdy	Free agent	(Nigeria) Rivers Hoopers	
28 February	(United States) Rashaad Singleton	Free agent	(Madagascar) GNBC	
28 February	(Democratic Republic of the Congo) Rolly Fula	(Democratic Republic of the Congo) ASB Mazembe	(Algeria) GS Pétroliers	
1 March	(United States) Rashad Whack	(Czech Republic) USK Praha	(Mozambique) Ferroviário de Maputo	
2 March	(Democratic Republic of the Congo) Maxi Shamba	(Morocco) ES Sahel	(Egypt) Zamalek	
2 March	(Democratic Republic of the Congo) Gracin Bakumanya	(Croatia) Vrijednosnice Osijek	(Mozambique) Ferroviário de Maputo	
2 March	(Ivory Coast) Adjehi Baru	Free agent	(Mozambique) Ferroviário de Maputo	
3 March	(Ghana) Matthew Bryan-Amaning	(United Kingdom) Surrey Scorchers	(Egypt) Zamalek	
6 March	(United States) Gerel Simmons	(Iceland) Tindastóll	(Senegal) AS Douanes	

The season was postponed due to the COVID-19 pandemic in Africa and signings were continued later on, when the league was moved to May 2021.

Date	Player	From	To	Ref.
18 April 2021	(Nigeria) Chinemelu Elonu	(Puerto Rico) Capitanes de Arecibo	(Egypt) Zamalek	
18 April 2021	(Ivory Coast) Mouloukou Diabate	(France) Paris Basketball	(Egypt) Zamalek	
18 April 2021	(Angola) Gerson Domingos	(Angola) Interclube	(Angola) Petro de Luanda	

=== Between teams ===
Date	Player	From	To	Ref.
27 February	(United States) Wayne Arnold	(Morocco) AS Salé	(Egypt) Zamalek	
