= 2021 Rivers Hoopers season =

Rivers Hoopers
2021 season
- Head coach: Ogoh Odaudu
- BAL: Group stage

The 2021 BAL season was the 1st season for the Rivers Hoopers of the Basketball Africa League. The team began the season on May 16, 2021, in the season opener against Rwanda's Patriots BBC.

Coming off a third Nigerian Premier League, the team of Ogoh Odaudu qualified for the inaugural BAL season. Ahead of the season, the Hoopers signed Ben Uzoh, along with the American duo Chris Daniels and Taren Sullivan. They also signed ex-NBA champion Festus Ezeli. However, Ezeli got injured and had to miss the season. He was later replaced by Robinson Opong.

The Hoopers were allocated in Group A, but were unable to advance to the playoffs with their 1–2 record.

== Roster ==
=== Team ===
Note: Flags indicate national team eligibility at FIBA-sanctioned events. Players may hold other non-FIBA nationalities not displayed.

Rivers Hoopers roster
Players
Coaches

Pos.	No.	Nat.	Name	Ht.	Age
G	00	(Nigeria)	Balogun, Emmanuel	1.85 m (6 ft 1 in)	22 – 17 December 1998
SG	2	(Nigeria)	Alalibo, Ronald	1.83 m (6 ft 0 in)	26 – 8 May 1994
F	10	(Nigeria)	Nwaiwu, Onyebuchi	2.01 m (6 ft 7 in)	22 – 20 August 1998
C	11	(Nigeria)	Koko, Victor	2.08 m (6 ft 10 in)	23 – 4 June 1997
PF	12	(Nigeria)	Ajegbeyi, Solomon	2.06 m (6 ft 9 in)	25 – 2 November 1995
PG	14	(Nigeria)	Uzoh, Ben	1.91 m (6 ft 3 in)	32 – 18 March 1988
SG	15	(Uganda)	Opong, Robinson (I)	1.91 m (6 ft 3 in)	31 – 10 May 1989
SF	21	(Nigeria)	Osigbodi, Precious	2.01 m (6 ft 7 in)	25 – 7 July 1995
SG	22	(Nigeria)	Ikechukwu, Benjamin (C)	1.98 m (6 ft 6 in)	23 – 4 June 1997
C	23	(Nigeria)	Ugo, Victor James	2.08 m (6 ft 10 in)	28 – 14 December 1992
SF	24	(United States)	Sullivan, Taren (I)	1.98 m (6 ft 6 in)	25 – 30 July 1995
SG	33	(Nigeria)	Owoicho, Simon	1.91 m (6 ft 3 in)	25 – 23 November 1995
C	55	(United States)	Daniels, Chris (I)	2.08 m (6 ft 10 in)	36 – 19 April 1984

Head coach

- (Nigeria) Ogoh Odaudu

Assistant coach(es)

- (Nigeria) Johnson Orupabo
- (Nigeria) Wilkinson Suobo

Legend

- (C) Team captain
- (I) Import player
- Injured

- Roster
Updated: May 16, 2020

=== Additions ===
No.	Pos.	Nat.	Name	Moving from		Date	Source
14	PG	(Nigeria)	Ben Uzoh	Paris	(France)	April 15, 2021	
24	SF	(United States)	Taren Sullivan	Erie BayHawks	(United States)	April 16, 2021	
55	C	(United States)	Chris Daniels	Alaska Aces	(Philippines)	April 16, 2021	
15	SG	(Uganda)	Robinson Opong	Saskatchewan Rattlers	(Canada)	April 22, 2021	

== Games ==
=== BAL ===
==== Group phase ====
Pos	Team	Pld	W	L	PF	PA	PD	Pts	Qualification
1	(Tunisia) US Monastir	3	3	0	303	211	+92	6	Advance to playoffs
2	(Rwanda) Patriots (H)	3	2	1	236	223	+13	5	Advance to playoffs
3	(Nigeria) Rivers Hoopers	3	1	2	210	251	−41	4	
4	(Madagascar) GNBC	3	0	3	207	271	−64	3	

Source: BAL
(H) Hosts

16 May 2021 1	Patriots (Rwanda)	83–60	(Nigeria) Rivers Hoopers	Kigali
14:00 GMT	Scoring by quarter: 17–18, 26–16, 22–10, 18–16
	Pts: Costner 20; Rebs: Ibeh 11; Asts: Gasana 4	Boxscore	Pts: Sullivan 15; Rebs: Koko 8 Asts: Uzoh 5	Arena: Kigali Arena; Attendance: 2,000

20 May 2021 2	Rivers Hoopers (Nigeria)	70–99	(Tunisia) US Monastir	Kigali
15:30 GMT	Scoring by quarter: 12–24, 10–25, 25–21, 23–29
	Pts: Daniels 25; Rebs: Daniels 11; Asts: Uzoh 8	Boxscore	Pts: Slimane 23; Rebs: Ghayaza, Lahyani, Majok 6 Asts: Abada 6	Arena: Kigali Arena

23 May 2021 3	GNBC (Madagascar)	69–80	(Nigeria) Rivers Hoopers	Kigali
12:00 GMT	Scoring by quarter: 18-18, 22-23, 19-18, 10-21
	Pts: Mandimbison 19; Rebs: Mandimbison 6 Asts: Razanamahenina 5		Pts: Sullivan 19; Rebs: Koko 12; Asts: Uzoh, Daniels, Balogun 3	Arena: Kigali Arena

== Statistics ==
Legend
GP	Games played	GS	Games started	MPG	Minutes per game
FG%	Field-goal percentage	3P%	3-point field-goal percentage	FT%	Free-throw percentage
RPG	Rebounds per game	APG	Assists per game	SPG	Steals per game
BPG	Blocks per game	PPG	Points per game

Rivers Hoopers statistics
Player	GP	MPG	FG%	3FG%	FT%	RPG	APG	SPG	BPG	PPG	
Ben Uzoh	3	3	29.1	55.9	0	66.7	4.7	5.3	1.0	0.7	14.7
Taren Sullivan	3	3	26.4	41.0	26.7	77.8	3.3	1.3	1.3	0.0	14.3
Chris Daniels	3	3	23.6	60.0	44.4	80.0	8.3	1.7	1.7	1.7	14.0
Benjamin Ikechukwu	3	3	23.4	25.0	23.1	–	4.0	1.3	1.0	0.3	7.3
Solomon Ajegbeyi	3	0	19.0	36.8	0	75.0	5.3	0.0	0.7	0.3	6.7
Victor Koko	3	3	20.8	27.8	0	33.3	8.3	1.3	0.0	2.3	4.0
Robinson Opong	3	0	17.4	15.8	8.3	–	3.3	2.0	1.0	0.0	2.3
Precious Saliu	3	0	9.3	16.7	22.2	33.3	1.0	1.0	0.0	0.0	2.3
Simon Ameh	3	0	8.9	25.0	33.3	100	0.7	1.3	0.3	0.0	2.3
Onyebuchi Nwaiwu	3	0	9.4	33.3	–	–	2.0	0.3	0.3	0.0	1.3
Emmanuel Balogun	3	0	8.8	20.0	0	–	0.3	1.3	0.3	0.0	0.7
Victor James Ugo	1	0	6.6	0	–	–	1.0	1.0	0	0	0
Ronald Alalibo	2	0	2.3	–	–	–	0.0	0.0	0	0	0
