= BAL Coach of the Year =

BAL Coach of the Year Award
- Sport: Basketball
- League: Basketball Africa League
- Awarded for: Best coach in the season of the Basketball Africa League

History
- First award: 2022
- Most wins: 6 coaches (1 each)
- Most recent: Henry Mwinuka (2026)

The Basketball Africa Coach of the Year Award is an annual Basketball Africa League (BAL) award given to the best coach of a given season. The award was first handed out in the 2022 season to José Neto.

The winner of the award is based on two criteria: developed a mutually respectful relationship with league, game officials, media, opponents and fans; and had the best results based on the resources at their disposal.

The winner of the awards is decided by voting by all head coaches and two assistant coaches per team, which cannot vote on a coach on their same team. Fouad Abou Chakra and Henry Mwinuka are the only award winner to have won the championship in the same season, in 2025.

== Winners ==
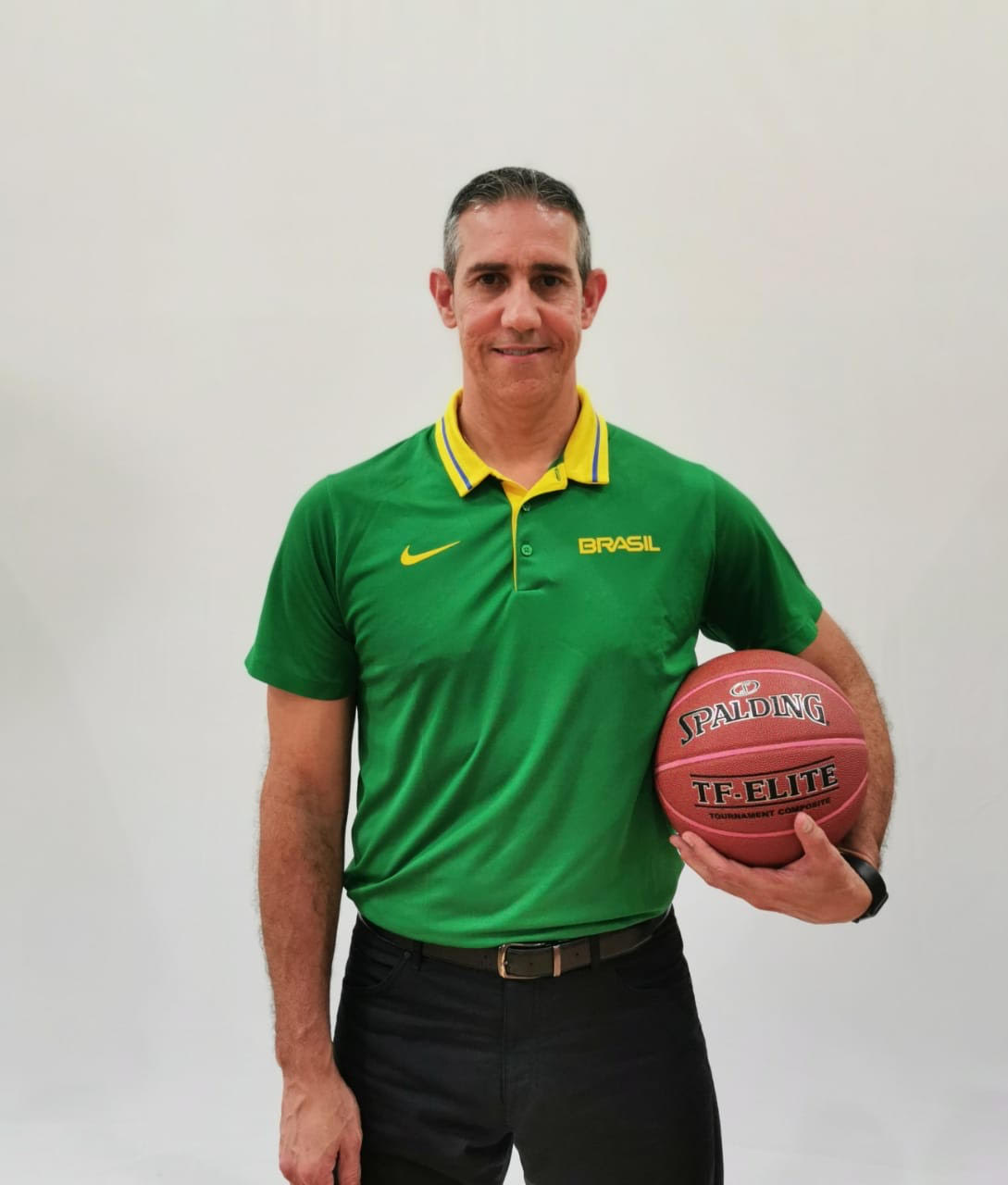
José Neto won the first award in 2022.

Note: † denotes the team won the championship

Season	Coach	Nationality	Club	Record	Win %	Ref
2022	José Neto	Brazil	(Angola) Petro de Luanda	6–2	.750	
2023	Pabi Guèye	Senegal	(Senegal) AS Douanes	5–3	.625	
2024	Ogoh Odaudu	Nigeria	(Nigeria) Rivers Hoopers	6–4	.600	
2025	Fouad Abou Chakra	Lebanon	(Libya) Al Ahli Tripoli †	9–1	.900	
2026	Henry Mwinuka	Tanzania	(Rwanda) RSSB †	7–2	.778	
