= 2021 BAL playoffs =

1st season of the BAL Playoffs

2021 BAL Playoffs
Tournament details
- Venue(s): Kigali Arena, Kigali, Rwanda
- Dates: 26 – 30 May 2021
- Teams: 8

Final positions
- Champions: (Egypt) Zamalek (1st title)
- Runner-up: (Tunisia) US Monastir
- Third place: (Angola) Petro de Luanda
- Fourth place: (Rwanda) Patriots

Tournament statistics
- Matches played: 8
- Attendance: 5,996 (750 per match)

The 2021 BAL Playoffs were the inaugural playoffs of the Basketball Africa League (BAL) and were the concluding tournament of the 2021 BAL season. The playoffs began on 26 May 2021 and ended on 30 May 2021 with the Finals. The entire playoffs were played at Kigali Arena in Kigali, Rwanda.

== Seeding ==
Teams were ranked and seeded based on their results in the group stage. Teams are ranked according to points, and if tied on points, the following tiebreaking criteria are applied, in the order given, to determine the rankings:

1. Head-to-head matches among tied teams;
2. Points difference;
3. Points scored;

Pos	Team	Pld	W	L	PF	PA	PD	Pts
1	(Tunisia) US Monastir	3	3	0	303	211	+92	6
2	(Egypt) Zamalek	3	3	0	254	181	+73	6
3	(Angola) Petro de Luanda	3	3	0	247	208	+39	6
4	(Rwanda) Patriots (H)	3	2	1	236	223	+13	5
5	(Mozambique) Ferroviário de Maputo	3	2	1	229	218	+11	5
6	(Morocco) AS Salé	3	2	1	253	260	−7	5
7	(Cameroon) FAP	3	1	2	235	218	+17	4
8	(Senegal) AS Douanes	3	1	2	230	250	−20	4

Source: BAL
(H) Hosts

== Bracket ==
Quarterfinals
27 May
1 (Tunisia) US Monastir	86
8 (Senegal) AS Douanes	62
27 May
4 (Rwanda) Patriots	73
5 (Mozambique) Ferroviário de Maputo	71
26 May
2 (Egypt) Zamalek	82
7 (Cameroon) FAP	53
26 May
3 (Angola) Petro de Luanda	79
6 (Morocco) AS Salé	72

Semifinals
29 May
1 (Tunisia) US Monastir	87
4 (Rwanda) Patriots	46
29 May
2 (Egypt) Zamalek	89
3 (Angola) Petro de Luanda	71

Finals
30 May
1 (Tunisia) US Monastir	63
2 (Egypt) Zamalek	76
Third place game
30 May
4 (Rwanda) Patriots	68
3 (Angola) Petro de Luanda	97

== Quarterfinals ==
26 May 2021	Zamalek (Egypt)	82–53	(Cameroon) FAP	Kigali
15:30 GMT	Scoring by quarter: 12–16, 18–12, 25–14, 27–11
	Pts: Hodge 18; Rebs: Three players 8 Asts: Hodge 6	Boxscore	Pts: Harouna 21; Rebs: Nkene & Hezekiah 8 Asts: Thomas Jr. 3	Arena: Kigali Arena; Attendance: 514

26 May 2021	Petro de Luanda (Angola)	79–72	(Morocco) AS Salé	Kigali
19:00 GMT	Scoring by quarter: 20–12, 23–23, 12–20, 24–17
	Pts: Gonçalves 19; Rebs: Gonçalves 10; Asts: Gonçalves 6	Boxscore	Pts: Stoglin 30; Rebs: Najah 9 Asts: Mahsini 6	Arena: Kigali Arena; Attendance: 543

27 May 2021	US Monastir (Tunisia)	86–62	(Senegal) AS Douanes	Kigali
17:30 GMT	Scoring by quarter: 19–16, 29–18, 18–13, 20–15
	Pts: Majok 17; Rebs: Slimane 9 Asts: Abada 8	Boxscore	Pts: Diallo 15; Rebs: Diop 5 Asts: Faye 6	Arena: Kigali Arena; Attendance: 643

27 May 2021	Patriots (Rwanda)	73–71	(Mozambique) Ferroviário de Maputo	Kigali
19:00 GMT	Scoring by quarter: 24–15, 18–24, 12–18, 19–14
	Pts: Gasana 23; Rebs: Three players 5 Asts: Costner 5	Boxscore	Pts: Holland 13; Rebs: Masa 9 Asts: Holland 8	Arena: Kigali Arena; Attendance: 1,704

== Semifinals ==
29 May 2021	Zamalek (Egypt)	89–71	(Angola) Petro de Luanda	Kigali
13:00 GMT	Scoring by quarter: 24–24, 31–15, 17–13, 17–19
	Pts: Hodge 19; Rebs: Mahmoud 7 Asts: Hodge 10	Boxscore	Pts: Morais 18; Rebs: Pedro 9 Asts: Dundão & Gonçalves 3	Arena: Kigali Arena; Attendance: 704

29 May 2021	US Monastir (Tunisia)	87–46	(Rwanda) Patriots	Kigali
17:30 GMT	Scoring by quarter: 16-14, 21-8, 28-11, 22-13
	Pts: Abada 18; Rebs: Majok 12; Asts: Abada 5	Boxscore	Pts: Ndizeye 13; Rebs: Wamokota 10; Asts: 5 players 2	Arena: Kigali Arena; Attendance: 1,141

== Third place game ==
30 May 2021	Petro de Luanda (Angola)	97–68	(Rwanda) Patriots	Kigali
10:30	Scoring by quarter: 24–14, 29–23, 27–13, 17–18
	Pts: Joaquim 21; Rebs: Pedro 9 Asts: Scott 7	Boxscore	Pts: Gasana 18; Rebs: Ndizeye 8 Asts: Gasana & Sagamba 3	Arena: Kigali Arena; Attendance: 747; Referees: Wael Ibrahim Mostafa, Kalume Tonton Banza, Walelign Fikadu Gebeto

== Final ==
30 May 2021	US Monastir (Tunisia)	63–76	(Egypt) Zamalek	Kigali
16:00 CAT (14:00 GMT)	Scoring by quarter: 22–17, 20–27, 9–11, 12–21
	Pts: Ben Romdhane, Crawford 14; Rebs: Ben Romdhane 10; Asts: Abada 5 PIR: Three players 12	Report	Pts: Fakuade 15; Rebs: Elonu 12; Asts: Diabate 6 PIR: Elonu 22	Arena: Kigali Arena; Attendance: 1,789; Referees: Samir Abaakil (Morocco), Marie Leslie Cherubin (Mauritius), Kingsley Ojeaburu (Nigeria)
