= Taren Sullivan =

American basketball player (born 1995)

No. 5 – Tokyo Hachioji Bee Trains
- Position: Small forward
- League: B.League

Personal information
- Born: July 30, 1995 (age 31)
- Listed height: 6 ft 6 in (1.98 m)
- Listed weight: 220 lb (100 kg)

Career information
- High school: Bath High School (Lima, Ohio)
- College: Findlay (2014–2018)
- NBA draft: 2018: undrafted
- Playing career: 2018–present

Career history
- 2018–2019: Stockton Kings
- 2019–2020: Erie BayHawks
- 2021: Rivers Hoopers
- 2021–2022: Artland Dragons
- 2022-2023: BKM Lučenec
- 2023-present: Tokyo Hachioji Bee Trains

Career highlights
- NCAA Division II All-American Team (2018); First-team All-GLIAC (2017); Second-team All-GLIAC (2016); NCAA Division II Regional All-Tournament Team (2017)
- Stats at Basketball Reference

Taren Valdis Sullivan (born July 30, 1995) is an American professional basketball player for Tokyo Hachioji Bee Trains of the B.League. He played college basketball for the Findlay Oilers in the NCAA Division II, before turning professional in 2019. He is a 6 ft 6 in (1.98 m) tall small forward.

== Early life ==
Sullivan played baseball and basketball as a child and decided to pursue basketball because he thought it would give him the best chance to play college. He played since he was in second grade at Bath High School.

== College career ==
Sullivan received a scholarship from the Findlay Oilers, where he played for four years and left with a bachelor's degree in strength and conditioning. In his final season, he averaged 17.2 points on 53% from the field, 6 rebounds and 3.2 assists.

== Professional career ==
He went undrafted in the 2018 NBA draft but signed with the Sacramento Kings later; however, he was waived again quickly. Performing well at the NBA G League Invitatitional in August 2018, Sullivan started his pro career with the Stockton Kings of the NBA G League in 2018.

After one season with the Kings, he was traded to the Erie BayHawks. Before the season ended due to the coronavirus pandemic he averaged 7.7 points and 4 rebounds per game.

In May 2021, Sullivan joined the Nigerian Rivers Hoopers for the inaugural season of the Basketball Africa League (BAL). He averaged 14.3 points in three games that were all lost, as the Hoopers were eliminated in the group stage.

On July 30, 2021, he signed with Artland Dragons of the German second-level ProA. He averaged 10.9 points and 3.6 rebounds over the season.

On July 23, 2022, Sullivan signed with Dutch team Landstede Hammers of the BNXT League. On August 3, the Hammers announced that the deal with Sullivan fell through and he would not join the team.

On July 1, 2023, Sullivan signed with Tokyo Hachioji Bee Trains of the Japanese B.League.

== BAL career statistics ==
Legend
GP	Games played	GS	Games started	MPG	Minutes per game
FG%	Field goal percentage	3P%	3-point field goal percentage	FT%	Free throw percentage
RPG	Rebounds per game	APG	Assists per game	SPG	Steals per game
BPG	Blocks per game	PPG	Points per game	**Bold**	Career high

Year	Team	GP	GS	MPG	FG%	3P%	FT%	RPG	APG	SPG	BPG	PPG
2021	Rivers Hoopers	3	3	26.3	.410	.267	.778	3.3	1.3	1.3	.0	14.3
