= Hassan Attia (basketball) =

Egyptian basketball player

Al-Ansar
- Position: Power forward / center
- League: Saudi Basketball Premier League

Personal information
- Born: 1 January 1994 (age 32) Alexandria, Egypt
- Listed height: 2.08 m (6 ft 10 in)
- Listed weight: 122 kg (269 lb)

Career information
- College: Colby Community College (2014–2016); Hartford (2016–2018)
- NBA draft: 2018: undrafted

Career history
- 2021: AS Douanes
- 2022–present: Al-Ansar

Career highlights
- All-America East Defensive Team (2018)

Hassan Attia (born 1 January 1994) is an Egyptian basketball player who plays for Al-Ansar. Standing at 2.08 m (6 ft 10 in), he plays as power forward. Attia played two seasons of collegiate basketball for the Hartford Hawks

== College career ==
Attia played two years for Colby Community College, before transferring to Hartford. In his senior year, he started in all 33 games. On 10 January 2018, he scored a career-high 20 points versus UMass Lowell. Attia finished as the number three all-time leader in blocks for Hartford, with 118 total blocks.

== Professional career ==
In May 2021, Attia joined Senegalese champions AS Douanes on the roster for the 2022 BAL season.

== BAL career statistics ==
Legend
GP	Games played	GS	Games started	MPG	Minutes per game
FG%	Field goal percentage	3P%	3-point field goal percentage	FT%	Free throw percentage
RPG	Rebounds per game	APG	Assists per game	SPG	Steals per game
BPG	Blocks per game	PPG	Points per game	**Bold**	Career high

Year	Team	GP	GS	MPG	FG%	3P%	FT%	RPG	APG	SPG	BPG	PPG
2021	AS Douanes	3	0	17.3	.400	–	.333	3.3	.3	1.7	1.3	5.7
Career		3	0	17.3	.400	–	.333	3.3	.3	1.7	1.3	5.7
