= Chris Cokley =

American basketball player

Free agent
- Position: Power forward

Personal information
- Born: July 27, 1996 (age 30) Savannah, Georgia
- Listed height: 6 ft 8 in (2.03 m)
- Listed weight: 229 lb (104 kg)

Career information
- High school: Savannah (Savannah, Georgia)
- College: UAB (2014–2018)
- NBA draft: 2018: undrafted
- Playing career: 2018–present

Career history
- 2018–2019: Cherkaski Mavpy
- 2019: Rabotnički
- 2019–2020: BC Khimik
- 2020–2021: AB Contern
- 2021: AS Douanes
- 2021–2022: BKM Lučenec

Career highlights
- First-team All-Conference USA (2018)

Chris Cokley (born July 27, 1996) is an American basketball player who last played for AS Douanes of the Basketball Africa League (BAL). He competed in college for the UAB Blazers.

== Early life ==
Cokley is the son of Angela Green and he grew up on the east side of Savannah, Georgia. He first began playing basketball at the age of five and learned the game at the Blackshear Community Center. Cokley developed into a star at Savannah High School, where he was coached by Tim Jordan. He led the team to the GHSA Class 5A finals as a sophomore. As a junior, he passed out in a state quarterfinal game against Washington County High School and missed the semifinal game, but returned in the state finals.

== College career ==
Cokley was recruited to the University of Alabama at Birmingham (UAB), where he earned regular minutes on a Blazers team that reached the NCAA Tournament as a No. 14 seed and defeated No. 3 seed Iowa State in the first round of the tournament. As a sophomore, Cokley partnered with William Lee in the frontcourt to win the C-USA regular-season championship and set a school record with 26 wins. Cokley posted 13.1 points and 6.5 rebounds per game as a sophomore and was selected to the Second Team All-Conference USA. in 2016 Cokley averaged 12.1 points per game as a junior, second on the team to Lee. As a senior, Cokley averaged 16.9 points, 8.7 rebounds and 1.5 steals per game and started 29 of 32 games. He was named to the First Team All-Conference USA. Cokley finished third all-time in UAB history in scoring (1,660) and second in rebounding (857). After his senior season, he was invited to the Portsmouth Invitational Tournament.

== Professional career ==
After going undrafted in the 2018 NBA draft, Cokley was signed by the Charlotte Hornets in the NBA Summer League. Cokley signed his first professional contract with the German team Rasta Vechta on July 30, 2018. However, he left the team on September 9, before appearing in any games. On September 16, Cokley signed with Ukrainian club Cherkaski Mavpy.

On September 10, 2019, he has signed with Rabotnički of the Macedonian First League. Few weeks later, he left the club. Cokley joined BC Khimik in Ukraine. On February 24, 2020, Cokley joined AB Contern in Luxembourg.

In April 2021, Cokley signed with the Senegalese club AS Douanes to play in the 2021 BAL season.

On November 24, 2021, he joined BKM Lučenec of the Slovak Basketball League (SBL).

=== The Basketball Tournament ===
Cokley played for the Texas Matadors in The Basketball Tournament in 2018. He had 20 points in the 82–73 loss to Scarlet and Gray in the Super 16. Cokley joined Herd That, a team composed primarily of Marshall alumni, in The Basketball Tournament 2020. He scored 32 points in a 102–99 come-from-behind win over the Money Team in the second round. Cokley scored 17 points as Herd That fell to Overseas Elite 93–76 in the quarterfinals.

== BAL career statistics ==
Legend
GP	Games played	GS	Games started	MPG	Minutes per game
FG%	Field goal percentage	3P%	3-point field goal percentage	FT%	Free throw percentage
RPG	Rebounds per game	APG	Assists per game	SPG	Steals per game
BPG	Blocks per game	PPG	Points per game	**Bold**	Career high

Year	Team	GP	GS	MPG	FG%	3P%	FT%	RPG	APG	SPG	BPG	PPG
2021	AS Douanes	4	1	17.1	.375	.333	.667	2.8	3.3	1.0	.0	5.8
Career		4	1	17.1	.375	.333	.667	2.8	3.3	1.0	.0	5.8
