= Pape Mbaye =

Senegalese basketball player (born 1994)

AS Douanes
- Position: Power forward
- League: Basketball Africa League

Personal information
- Born: January 23, 1994 (age 32) Guédiawaye, Senegal
- Listed height: 6 ft 8 in (2.03 m)

Career information
- Playing career: 2012–present

Career history
- 2012–2013: Real Madrid B
- 2013–2014: Alcázar
- 2015: Palencia
- 2015–2016: Peixefresco
- 2016–2017: CEP Fleurus
- 2017–2019: CB Tarragona
- 2019-2021: SKT Ieper
- 2021: AS Douanes

Pape Modou Mbaye (born January 23, 1994) is an international Senegalese basketball player. He spent a few seasons at Real Madrid.

== Profile ==
Mbaye is a player with a great wingspan, great talent and athletic skills. He also has the good qualities for penetrating inside and shooting, especially from wide range. His greatest virtue is trying to improve himself as a player and a better person every day, through hard work and effort. The forward Paul Pierce is the reference player for the Senegalese.

== Professional career ==
Pape Mbaye arrived in Spain in 2008 to play for Tenerife CB. In April 2009, being only 15 years old, he was named best young player at the prestigious Under-19 Tournament of Lissone (Italy). That same year he stands with great performances at the Under-16 tournament in La Orotava (Tenerife), scoring 35 points against Real Madrid or 31 against Zalgiris Kaunas.

In the summer of 2010, Mbaye signed a contract with Real Madrid. During the 2012/13 season, at the age of 18, he was a key player for Real Madrid Baloncesto B, coached by Alberto Angulo.

During the 2013/14 he played for Alcázar Basket, averaging 11 points and 8 rebounds per game.

In February 2015 he continued his progression and signed for Palencia Baloncesto of LEB Oro, the second league in importance in Spain.

In 2017, he played in Belgium for CEP Fleurus, where he averaged 14.3 and 6.8 rebounds per game.

In 2020, he signed a one-year deal with Basket SKT Ieper, in the Second Division in Belgium (TDM1). Due the COVID-crisis, the season was canceled after 2 games. In January 2021, he extended his contract for the next three seasons.

In 2021, he signed for AS Douanes to play in the inaugural season of the Basketball Africa League.

=== Teams ===
- 2008–10 (Spain) Tenerife CB
- 2010–12 (Spain) Real Madrid U-18
- 2012–13 (Spain) Real Madrid Baloncesto B
- 2013–14 (Spain) LEB. Alcázar
- 2015 (Spain) LEB. Palencia Baloncesto
- 2015-16 (Spain) LEB. CB Peixefresco
- 2016-17 Belgium League. CEP Fleurus
- 2017-19 (Spain) LEB CB Tarragona
- 2019-21 Belgium League. SKT Ieper
- 2021- (Senegal) BAL. AS Douanes

== International career ==
Pape Mbaye has competed for Senegal through multiple youth national teams.

He also participated at the 2013 FIBA Under-19 World Championship, averaging 6 points and 4.2 rebounds per game.

In March, 2017, he was selected to participate with the Senegal National team in the FIBA AfroBasket 2017 qualifiers. Mbaye played 3 games, and Senegal qualified for the Tournament.

== BAL career statistics ==
Legend
| GP | Games played | GS | Games started | MPG | Minutes per game |
| FG% | Field goal percentage | 3P% | 3-point field goal percentage | FT% | Free throw percentage |
| RPG | Rebounds per game | APG | Assists per game | SPG | Steals per game |
| BPG | Blocks per game | PPG | Points per game | **Bold** | Career high |

| Year | Team | GP | GS | MPG | FG% | 3P% | FT% | RPG | APG | SPG | BPG | PPG |
|---|---|---|---|---|---|---|---|---|---|---|---|---|
| 2021 | AS Douanes | 2 | 0 | 20.0 | .571 | .667 | – | 2.5 | .0 | 1.0 | .5 | 6.0 |
| Career | | 2 | 0 | 20.0 | .571 | .667 | – | 2.5 | .0 | 1.0 | .5 | 6.0 |
