= Demarcus Holland =

American basketball player (born 1994)

Personal information
- Born: March 2, 1994 (age 32) Tyler, Texas, U.S.
- Listed height: 6 ft 4 in (1.93 m)
- Listed weight: 179 lb (81 kg)

Career information
- High school: Naaman Forest (Garland, Texas)
- College: Texas (2012–2016)
- NBA draft: 2016: undrafted
- Playing career: 2017–2024
- Position: Shooting guard

Career history
- 2017: Plaza Fernando Valerio
- 2017–2018: South Bay Lakers
- 2018–2019: Agua Caliente Clippers
- 2019–2020: BC Nokia
- 2020: Hamburg Towers
- 2020–2021: Science City Jena
- 2021: Ferroviário de Maputo
- 2021: Saskatchewan Rattlers
- 2021–2022: Delaware Blue Coats
- 2023: Spartans de Distrito Capital
- 2023: APR
- 2024: Tauranga Whai

Career highlights
- RBL champion (2023); Nba G-League Showcase Cup Champion (2021); Big 12 All-Defensive Team (2014)

Demarcus Dejuan Holland (born March 2, 1994) is an American former professional basketball player. He played four seasons of college basketball for the Texas Longhorns, where he earned Big 12 All-Defensive Team selection in 2014. He has played professionally in Dominican Republic, NBA G League, Finland, Germany, Mozambique, Canada, Venezuela and Rwanda.

== Early life ==
Holland was born in Tyler, Texas, and moved to Dallas when he was in the second grade.

Holland attended Naaman Forest High School in Garland, Texas, where he averaged a team-high 11.3 points, 4.9 rebounds, 4.1 assists and two steals per game while leading the team to a 29–8 record and the Class 5A state semifinals as a senior.

== College career ==
Holland played four seasons of college basketball for the Texas Longhorns between 2012 and 2016. He earned Big 12 All-Defensive Team honors as a sophomore in 2013–14.

== Professional career ==
Holland's first professional stint came with Plaza Fernando Valerio in the Dominican Republic Santiago League in 2017. He averaged 18.7 points, 1.1 rebounds and 3.1 assists in 10 games.

Holland joined the South Bay Lakers of the NBA G League for the 2017–18 season, where he averaged 8.5 points and 4.6 rebounds per game. He returned to the Lakers for the 2018–19 season but was traded to the Agua Caliente Clippers on December 2, 2018.

On September 25, 2019, Holland signed with BC Nokia of the Finnish Korisliiga for the 2019–20 season. In January 2020, he left Nokia and signed with Hamburg Towers of the German Basketball Bundesliga.

In September 2020, Holland signed with Science City Jena of the Basketball Bundesliga for the 2020–21 season.

In May 2021, Holland had a four-game stint with Mozambican club Ferroviário de Maputo of the Basketball Africa League. He averaged 13.8 points, 3.5 rebounds, 5.5 assists and 1.5 steals per game.

In July 2021, Holland signed with the Saskatchewan Rattlers of the Canadian Elite Basketball League for the 2021 season.

Holland joined the Delaware Blue Coats for the 2021–22 NBA G League season. In 43 games, he averaged 2.6 points and 2.4 rebounds per game.

In March 2023, Holland joined Spartans de Distrito Capital of the Venezuelan SPB. In August 2023, he joined Rwandan club APR of the Rwanda Basketball League (RBL). He helped the team win the 2023 RBL championship.

In March 2024, Holland signed with the Tauranga Whai of the New Zealand National Basketball League (NZNBL) for the 2024 season.

== Personal life ==
Holland is the son of Lacetia Bradford and Derrick Holland. He has one older brother, Derrick Jr., and three younger brothers, Craig, Desmond and Devon.
