= Eskander Bhouri =

Tunisian basketball player

No. 4 – Club Africain
- Position: Shooting guard
- League: Championnat Pro A

Personal information
- Born: 12 July 1997 (age 29) Monastir, Tunisia
- Listed height: 1.90 m (6 ft 3 in)

Career information
- Playing career: 2014–present

Career history
- 2014–2021: US Monastir
- 2021–present: Club Africain

Career highlights
- 3× Tunisian League champion (2019–2021); 2× Tunisian Cup winner (2020, 2021)

Eskander Bhouri (born 12 July 1997) is a Tunisian basketball player who currently plays for Club Africain of the Championnat Pro A.

He started his career with his hometown club US Monastir, where he played until signing for Club Africain in 2021.

== National team career ==
Bhouri played with the Tunisia national under-19 team at the 2015 FIBA Under-19 World Championship.

== BAL career statistics ==
Legend
GP	Games played	GS	Games started	MPG	Minutes per game
FG%	Field goal percentage	3P%	3-point field goal percentage	FT%	Free throw percentage
RPG	Rebounds per game	APG	Assists per game	SPG	Steals per game
BPG	Blocks per game	PPG	Points per game	**Bold**	Career high

Year	Team	GP	GS	MPG	FG%	3P%	FT%	RPG	APG	SPG	BPG	PPG
2021	US Monastir	3	0	4.0	.000	.000	–	.3	1.3	.3	.0	.0
Career		3	0	4.0	.000	.000	–	.3	1.3	.3	.0	.0
