= Chris Daniels (basketball) =

American basketball player (born 1984)

Personal information
- Born: April 19, 1984 (age 42) San Antonio, Texas, U.S.
- Listed height: 6 ft 10 in (2.08 m)
- Listed weight: 265 lb (120 kg)

Career information
- High school: Sam Houston (San Antonio, Texas)
- College: Texas A&M–Corpus Christi (2004–2008)
- NBA draft: 2008: undrafted
- Playing career: 2008–2023
- Position: Center

Career history
- 2008–2009: Daegu Orions
- 2009: Wonju Dongbu Promy
- 2009: Incheon Elephants
- 2009–2010: Anyang KT&G Kites
- 2010: Cangrejeros de Santurce
- 2010–2011: Jeonju KCC Egis
- 2011–2012: Erie Bayhawks
- 2012: Anyang KGC
- 2012: Santa Cruz Warriors
- 2012–2013: Qingdao DoubleStar
- 2013: Rio Grande Valley Vipers
- 2013: Applied Science University
- 2013: Liaoning Flying Leopards
- 2014: Sagesse
- 2014–2015: Guangdong Southern Tigers
- 2015–2016: Al-Riyadi Beirut
- 2016–2017: Quimsa
- 2017–2018: Al-Riyadi Beirut
- 2019: Alaska Aces
- 2021: Rivers Hoopers
- 2021–2022: Argentino de Junín
- 2022: Ezzahra Sports
- 2022–2023: Al Nawair

Career highlights
- Lebanese League champion (2016); NBA D-League champion (2013); 2× Korean League champion (2011, 2012); Korean League All-Star (2010); Southland Player of the Year (2007); First-team All-Southland (2007); Third-team All-Southland (2008)
- Stats at Basketball Reference

Robert Christopher Daniels (born April 19, 1984) is an American former professional basketball player. He played college basketball for Texas A&M–Corpus Christi before starting his professional career in 2008.

== College career ==
As a four-year player in Texas A&M–Corpus Christi, he played in 114 games, starting 73 where he averaged 12.3 points, 6 rebounds and 1.5 blocks in 22.9 minutes per game being named Southland Player of the Year and to the All-Southland first-team in his junior season when he averaged 15.3 points, 6.7 rebounds and 1.6 blocks leading the Islanders to their first NCAA tournament in history.

== Professional career ==
After going undrafted on the 2008 NBA draft, Daniels joined the Houston Rockets for the 2008 NBA Summer League. After that, he signed with the Daegu Orions of the Korean Basketball League. For two years he had stints with Wonju Dongbu Promy, Incheon Electroland Elephants and the Anyang KT&G Kites where he averaged 21 points and 9.1 rebounds.

On March 18, 2010, Daniels moved to Puerto Rico, with the Cangrejeros de Santurce where he spent the rest of the 2009–10 season. Then he signed with Jeonju KCC Egis for the 2010–11 season where he won the 2011 Korean Championship against Dongbu Promy, his former team, in six games. On the final and decisive match, Daniels led the team with a game-high 25 point and 10 rebounds.

On November 3, 2011, Daniels was selected by the Erie BayHawks with the 9th pick of the 2011 NBA Development League Draft and then signed with them. On December 9, 2011, Daniels signed with the Los Angeles Lakers but was waived two weeks later and returned with the BayHawks. On January 16, 2012, Daniels returned to Korea, now with Anyang KGC, where he won his second Korean championship, again, defeating Dongbu Promy in six games. He scored 15 points on the decisive match.

After participating with the NBA D-League Select Team at the 2012 NBA Summer League, the BayHawks traded his rights to the Santa Cruz Warriors for a 2012 D-League draft pick. After averaging 7 points and 5.7 rebounds with the Warriors, Daniels signed with Chinese team Qingdao DoubleStar on December 12. On March 8, 2013, Santa Cruz traded his rights to the Rio Grande Valley Vipers for Scott Machado. He signed with Rio Grande Valley afterwards.

After joining the Indiana Pacers for the 2013 NBA Summer League, and a small stint with Applied Science University of the Jordanian league, Daniels signed with the Liaoning Flying Leopards of China. After averaging 16.6 points and 8.3 rebounds he moved to Lebanon, now with Sagesse on January 18, 2014.

Despite the bad experience with the Leopards, Daniels came back to China after signing with the Guangdong Southern Tigers for the 2013–14 season. During his stint with the Tigers, he played in 33 games averaging 12.6 points and 7.7 rebounds, shooting 67.5% from two and 41.7% from three during the season.

On September 23, 2015, Daniels signed with the Brooklyn Nets. However, he was later waived by the Nets on October 20 after appearing in five preseason games. On December 25, he signed with Al-Riyadi Beirut, returning to Lebanon for a second stint.

On April 15, 2021, Daniels signed with Nigerian side Rivers Hoopers of the Basketball Africa League (BAL).

On November 16, 2021, he joined Argentino de Junín of the Liga Nacional de Básquet (LNB), returning to Argentina after 5 years. He averaged 10.7 points and 7.5 rebounds in 21.8 minutes per game in the LNB.

After starting the 2022–23 season with Ezzahra Sports in the Tunisian Championnat National A, Daniels joined Syrian club Nawair in December.

=== Legal battle against Liaoning ===
On September 1, 2013, after 8 games of a guaranteed contract, the Liaoning Flying Leopards released Daniels and refused to pay him the rest of his contract. After that, Daniels took legal action and sued the Chinese team for the payment refusal and several abuses, among them, putting Daniels' family in an isolated apartment without any heat. After analysing the situation, FIBA decided to take action and ordered Liaoning to pay Daniels his remaining unpaid salary plus lawyer fees, totalling $300 thousand, however, the Chinese team refused to recognise the judgement and planned to appeal (despite no means available to it). After the refusal, FIBA added a 130,000 dollars fine to the Chinese team.

== BAL career statistics ==
Legend
GP	Games played	GS	Games started	MPG	Minutes per game
FG%	Field goal percentage	3P%	3-point field goal percentage	FT%	Free throw percentage
RPG	Rebounds per game	APG	Assists per game	SPG	Steals per game
BPG	Blocks per game	PPG	Points per game	**Bold**	Career high

Year	Team	GP	GS	MPG	FG%	3P%	FT%	RPG	APG	SPG	BPG	PPG
2021	Rivers Hoopers	3	3	23.6	.600	.444	.800	8.3	1.7	1.7	1.7	14.0
Career		3	3	23.6	.600	.444	.800	8.3	1.7	1.7	1.7	14.0
