= Mamadou Faye (basketball) =

Senegalese basketball player

No. 14 – AS Douanes
- Position: Shooting guard
- League: Nationale 1

Personal information
- Born: 25 September 1993 (age 33)
- Listed height: 1.96 m (6 ft 5 in)

Career information
- Playing career: 2012–present

Career history
- 2012–2014: Dbaloc Derkle
- 2014–2016: M'Bour BC
- 2016–2019: US Ouakam
- 2019–2020: Olympique Batna
- 2020–present: AS Douanes

Career highlights
- Saint Michel Cup MVP (2019); Saint Michel Cup champion (2019)

Pape Mamadou "Mo" Faye (born 25 September 1993) is a Senegalese basketball player for AS Douanes and Senegal.

== Professional career ==
In 2012, Faye started his career with Dbaloc Derkle in the Senegalese second division. In 2014, Faye transferred to M'Bour BC to play in the Nationale 1. After two seasons, he signed with US Ouakam.

In the 2019–20 season, he played in Algeria with Olympique Batna of the Algerian Basketball Championship. There, he averaged 29 points and 6 assists per game.

In September 2020, Faye signed with the defending Senegalese champions AS Douanes. He played with the team in the 2021 BAL season, where he averaged 14.8 points.

== National team career ==
Faye was selected for the Senegal national basketball team, after coach Boniface N'Dong had watched him play in the 2021 BAL season. He was on the roster for AfroBasket 2021.

== BAL career statistics ==
Legend
GP	Games played	GS	Games started	MPG	Minutes per game
FG%	Field goal percentage	3P%	3-point field goal percentage	FT%	Free throw percentage
RPG	Rebounds per game	APG	Assists per game	SPG	Steals per game
BPG	Blocks per game	PPG	Points per game	**Bold**	Career high

Year	Team	GP	GS	MPG	FG%	3P%	FT%	RPG	APG	SPG	BPG	PPG
2021	AS Douanes	4	0	24.1	.488	.471	.692	4.0	5.5	.8	.0	14.8
Career		4	0	24.1	.488	.471	.692	4.0	5.5	.8	.0	14.8
