= Louis Adams (basketball, born 1990) =

Senegalese basketball player

ASC Ville de Dakar
- Position: Point guard
- League: Nationale 1

Personal information
- Born: 21 January 1990 (age 36) Dakar, Senegal
- Listed height: 6 ft 1 in (1.85 m)
- Listed weight: 180 lb (82 kg)

Career information
- College: Eastern Florida State College (2010–2012); South Carolina State (2012–2014)
- NBA draft: 2014: undrafted
- Playing career: 2014–present

Career history
- –2018: AS Douanes
- 2018–2019: CB Tormes
- 2020–2021: AS Douanes
- 2021–present: Ville de Dakar

Career highlights
- Senegalese League Finals MVP (2017)

Louis Adams (born 21 January 1990) is a Senegalese basketball player who currently plays for ASC Ville de Dakar of the Nationale 1 and Senegal.

== Professional career ==
Adams played in Spain for CB Tormes in the LEB Silver in the 2018–19 season. In February 2020, Adams returned to the Senegalese champions AS Douanes. The Douanes play in the Basketball Africa League (BAL).

In December 2021, Adams joined ASC Ville de Dakar for the 2022 season.

== International career ==
Adams played with Senegal at the 2017 AfroBasket.

== BAL career statistics ==
Legend
GP	Games played	GS	Games started	MPG	Minutes per game
FG%	Field goal percentage	3P%	3-point field goal percentage	FT%	Free throw percentage
RPG	Rebounds per game	APG	Assists per game	SPG	Steals per game
BPG	Blocks per game	PPG	Points per game	**Bold**	Career high

Year	Team	GP	GS	MPG	FG%	3P%	FT%	RPG	APG	SPG	BPG	PPG
2021	AS Douanes	1	0	7.3	.333	.000	–	1.0	.0	.0	.0	4.0
Career		1	0	7.3	.333	.000	–	1.0	.0	.0	.0	4.0
