= Bara Diop =

Senegalese basketball player (born 1992)

No. 11 – AS Douanes
- Position: Power forward
- League: Nationale 1 Basketball Africa League

Personal information
- Born: 14 August 1992 (age 34) M'Bour, Senegal
- Listed height: 6 ft 8 in (2.03 m)
- Listed weight: 97 kg (214 lb)

Career information
- NBA draft: 2014: undrafted

Career history
- ?–2017: AS Douanes
- 2017–2019: DUC Dakar
- 2020–present: AS Douanes

Career highlights
- BAL steals leader (2021); Senegalese Cup winner (2024); Senegalese Cup Final MVP (2024)
Medals
Men's basketball
Representing Senegal
Islamic Solidarity Games
Gold medal – first place	2021 Konya	3x3 basketball

Mamadou Lamine "Bara" Diop (born 14 August 1992) is a Senegalese basketball player for AS Douanes of the Basketball Africa League. Standing at 2.03 m (6 ft 8 in), he plays as power forward.

== Professional career ==
Born in M'Bour, Diop started playing for M'Bour Basket Club. He also enjoyed playing football but chose basketball at a later age. Diop started his career with AS Douanes in the Nationale 1, the national top tier level. In 2017, Diop left to play for the team of DUC Dakar.

In January 2021, Diop returned to AS Douanes. Diop was on the roster for AS Douanes in the 2021 BAL season. He led the team in rebounding and helped Douanes reach the quarterfinals of the tournament. Diop also led the league in steals with 2.5 per game.

In August 2024, Diop and Douanes won the Senegalese Basketball Cup, and he was named the Final MVP.

== Career statistics ==
=== BAL ===
Legend
GP	Games played	GS	Games started	MPG	Minutes per game
FG%	Field goal percentage	3P%	3-point field goal percentage	FT%	Free throw percentage
RPG	Rebounds per game	APG	Assists per game	SPG	Steals per game
BPG	Blocks per game	PPG	Points per game	**Bold**	Career high
*	Led the league

Year	Team	GP	GS	MPG	FG%	3P%	FT%	RPG	APG	SPG	BPG	PPG
2021	Douanes	4	4	31.4	.465	.357	.500	7.3	1.5	2.5*	1.3	12.3
2023	Douanes	7	0	12.5	.320	.000	.000	2.4	.4	.4	.0	2.3

== Personal ==
Diop graduated from Cheikh Anta Diop University.
