= AS Douanes (basketball) =

- Nickname: Les Gabelous
- Conference: Sahara
- Division: Nationale Division 1 Masculin
- Leagues: NM1; BAL
- Founded: 1980; 46 years ago
- History: AS Douanes (1980–present)
- Arena: Marius-Ndiaye Stadium
- Capacity: 3,000
- Location: Dakar, Senegal
- Main sponsor: Douane Sénégalaise
- President: Colonel Cheikh Diop
- Vice-president: Commandant Jack Matar Dieng
- Team manager: Souleymane Diatta
- Head coach: Pabi Gueye
- Team captain: Alkaly Ndour
- Ownership: Senegalese Customs Administration
- 2026 position: Nationale 1, 1st of 16
- Division titles: Division 1 Senegalese
- Website: https://www.asdouanesbasketball.com/
Home	Away

Association Sportive des Douanes, commonly known as AS Douanes, is a Senegalese basketball club from Dakar. Part of the Senegalese national customs agency, the team plays in the national top division Nationale 1 (NM1) and in the Basketball Africa League (BAL).

AS Douanes is the most decorated club in Senegalese basketball, having collected 35 trophies in its existence. The club has won a record 11 NM1 championships, seven Senegalese Cups, thirteen Mayor's Cups and five Saint Michel Cups.

The most successful international performance of AS Douanes was in 2023, when they finished as runners-up of the 2023 BAL season. They also reached the quarter-finals in the 2021 season.

Home games of the team are generally played in the Marius Ndiaye Stadium, which has capacity for 3,000 people.

== History ==
AS Douanes was established in 1980, as the basketball section of the Senegalese customs organisation. In 1998, the team won its first national championship.

They won two more championships in 2007 and 2008, followed by six championship in the 2010s.

In October 2019, Douane won its ninth Senegalese championship after defeating DUC in the final. By winning, Douanes qualified directly for the inaugural season of the Basketball Africa League (BAL) as an automatic spot was granted to the Senegalese champions.

In their debut season in the BAL, Les Gabelous were eliminated in the quarter-finals of the playoffs.

After losing the 2021 title to DUC and missing out on the BAL, Douanes won their 10th national title on 16 October 2022, after beating their arch-rivals 2–0 in the finals series.

Following their title, they qualified directly to the 2023 BAL season, returning after a one-year absence. They acquired Chris Crawford and Terrell Stoglin as American import players. The team lost the first two games of the season, after which the team released Stoglin from their roster. After this, Douanes won three straight games and was able to qualify for the playoffs after they defeated the defending champions US Monastir on the final game day. They eliminated Monastir as well, and advanced based on the tie-breaker between the five teams with a 3–2 record.

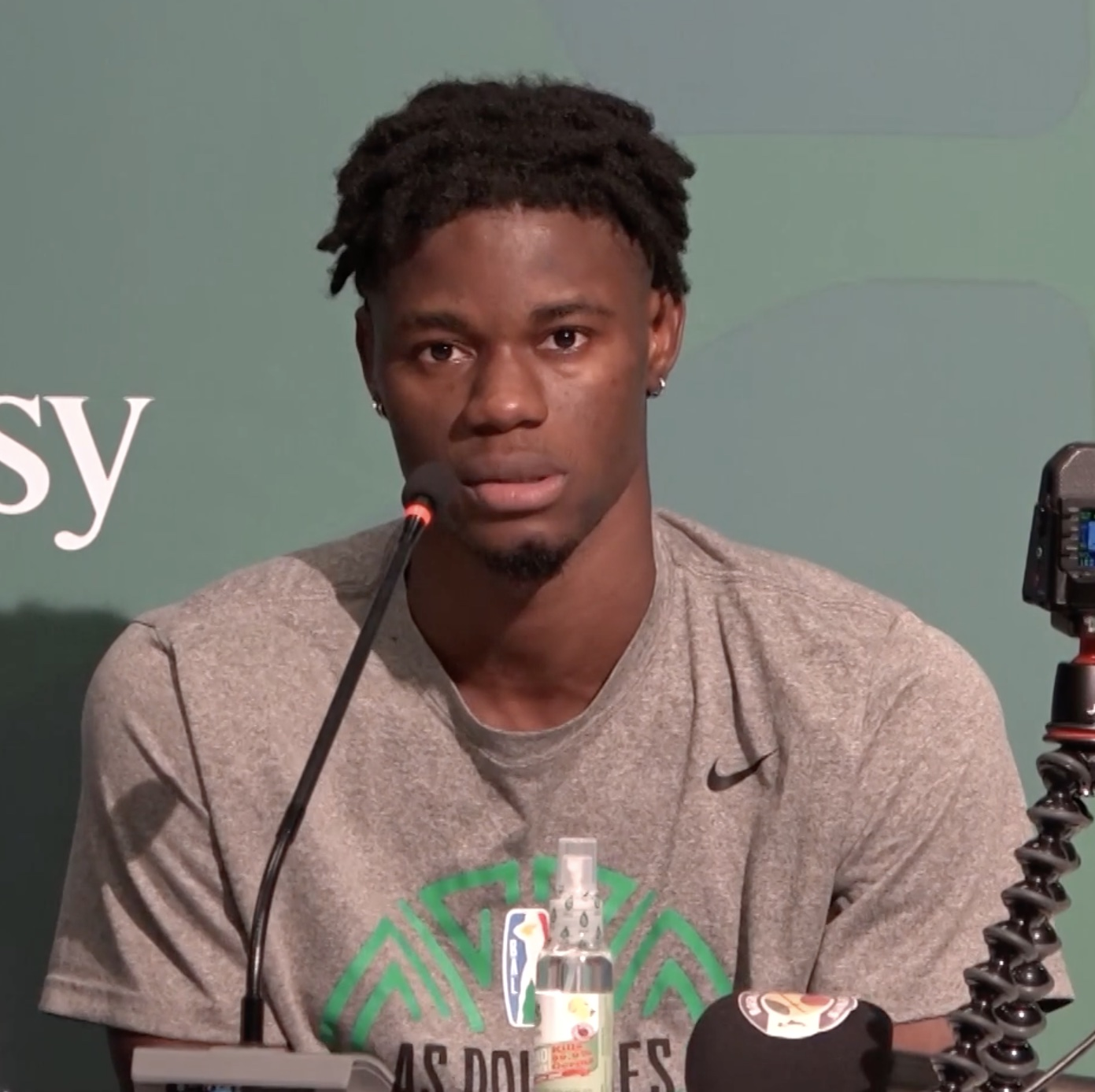
Douanes guard Jean Jacques Boissy was named to the All-BAL First Team in the 2023 season

In the 2023 BAL Playoffs, Douanes easily cruised past Ferroviário da Beira, before facing the reigning runners-up Petro de Luanda in the semi-final. Behind 28 points from Jean Jacques Boissy and 26 points from Crawford, Douanes beat the Angolan team in what was widely considered to be a shocking win. On 26 May, one day before the final, Pabi Gueye was named the BAL Coach of the Year. In the final, AS Douanes was defeated by Egyptian champions Al Ahly who led the majority of the game. Boissy and Crawford were, however, named to the All-BAL First Team.

On 17 September 2023, AS Douanes won 2023 national championship, overtaking ASFAS as the club with the most championships in Senegal basketball history.

== Players ==
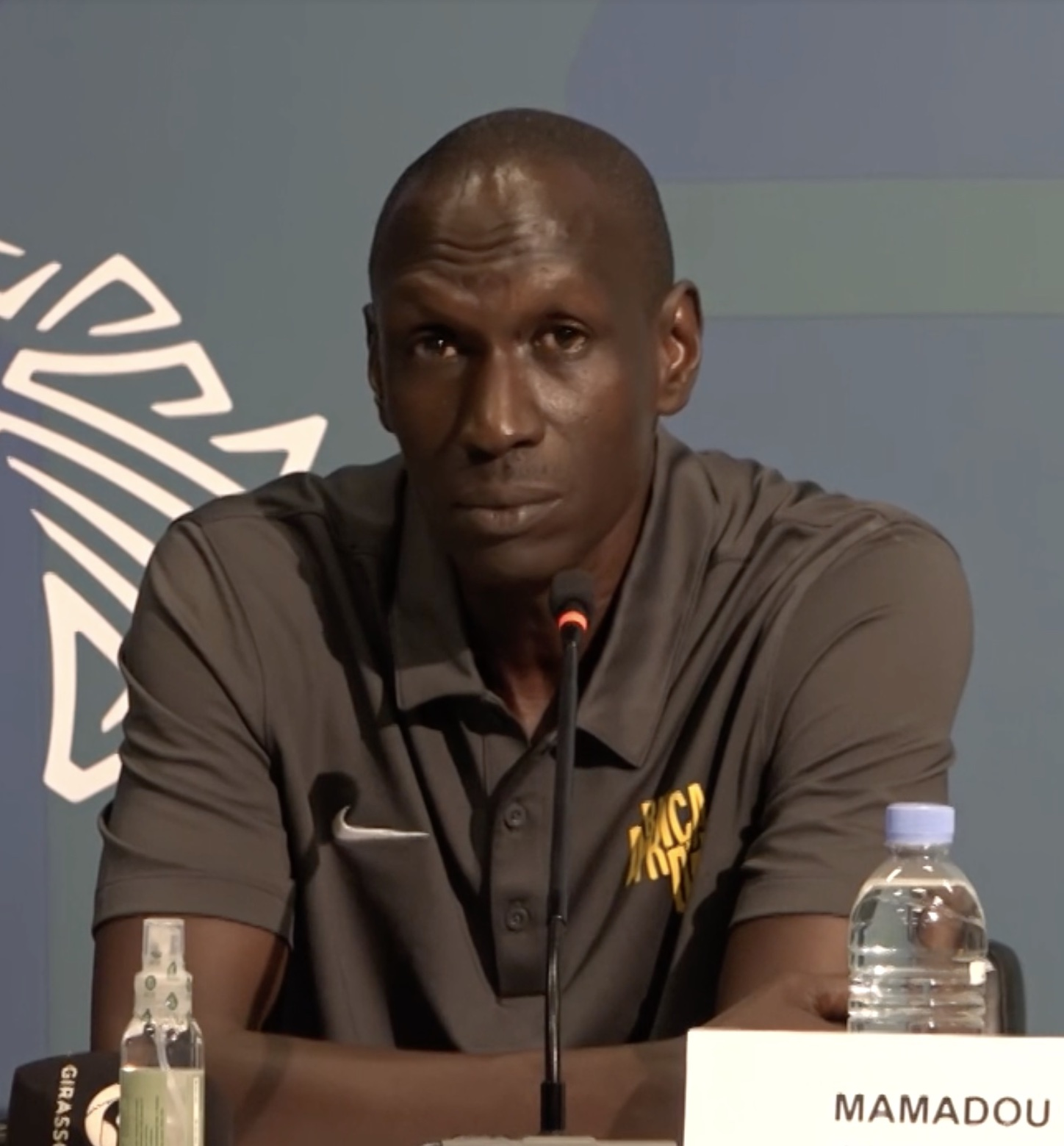
Pabi Gueye has been head coach of the team since 2013

=== Current roster ===
The final roster for the BAL season was announced on 30 April 2024.

=== BAL roster ===
Note: Flags indicate national team eligibility at FIBA-sanctioned events. Players may hold other non-FIBA nationalities not displayed.

AS Douanes roster
Players
Coaches

Pos.	No.	Nat.	Name	Ht.	Age
G	00	(Senegal)	Ndour, Alkaly	1.93 m (6 ft 4 in)	29 – 2 March 1997
G	2	(Senegal)	Fall, Samba Daly	1.96 m (6 ft 5 in)	27 – 17 January 1999
G	5	(Senegal)	Boissy, Jean Jacques	1.86 m (6 ft 1 in)	26 – 28 January 2000
PF	6	(Senegal)	Thomas, Ibrahima	2.13 m (7 ft 0 in)	39 – 7 February 1987
F/C	7	(Nigeria)	Obekpa, Chris (I)	2.08 m (6 ft 10 in)	32 – 14 November 1993
G	10	(Niger)	Harouna, Amadou (I)	1.96 m (6 ft 5 in)	33 – 12 December 1992
PF	11	(Senegal)	Diop, Bara	2.01 m (6 ft 7 in)	34 – 14 August 1992
F	13	(Ivory Coast)	Fofana, Mike (I)	2.06 m (6 ft 9 in)	29 – 10 May 1997
SF	14	(Senegal)	Mboup, Khadim (E)	2.06 m (6 ft 9 in)	20 – 14 September 2006
C	15	(Nigeria)	Ochereobia, Ifeanyichukwu (I)	2.03 m (6 ft 8 in)	37 – 27 July 1989
C	28	(Senegal)	Diakhite, Adama	2.06 m (6 ft 9 in)	29 – 12 April 1997
F/C	34	(Senegal)	Sy, Abdou	2.11 m (6 ft 11 in)	23 – 13 January 2003
SF	45	(South Sudan)	Akec, Madut (I)	2.01 m (6 ft 7 in)	27 – 1 January 1999

Head coach

- (Senegal) Pabi Gueye

Assistant coach(es)

- (Senegal) Parfait Advijon
- (United States) JP Adams

Legend

- (C) Team captain
- (I) Import player
- (E): BAL Elevate player
- Injured

- Roster
Updated: May 5, 2024

=== Individual awards ===
Nationale 1 King of the Season

- Ibrahima Mbengue – 2011
- Birahim Gaye – 2014
- Louis Adams – 2017
- Pape Moustapha Diop (2×) – 2018, 2019

Nationale 1 Finals MVP

- Samba Daly Fall (2×) – 2022, 2023

Nationale 1 Coach of the Year

- Pabi Gueye (5×) – 2016, 2017, 2018, 2019, 2022

Senegalese Cup Final MVP

- Pape Moustapha Diop – 2019
- Bamba Diallo – 2021
- Bara Diop – 2024

Saint Michel Cup Final MVP

- Jean Jacques Boissy – 2023

All-BAL First Team

- Jean Jacques Boissy – 2023
- Chris Crawford – 2023

BAL Coach of the Year

- Pabi Gueye – 2023

== Honours ==
Titles: 38

=== National competitions ===
Nationale 1 (record)

- Champions (12): 1998, 2007, 2008, 2011, 2014, 2016, 2017, 2018, 2019, 2022, 2023, 2026

Senegalese Cup

- Winners (9): 2000, 2004, 2006, 2011, 2012, 2017, 2019, 2021, 2024

Mayor's Cup

- Winners (13): 1988, 1995, 1996, 1997, 1998, 2006, 2007, 2009, 2011, 2012, 2014, 2017, 2018

Saint-Michel Cup

- Winners (5): 1993, 2005, 2007, 2018, 2023

=== International competitions ===
Basketball Africa League (BAL)

- Runners-up (1): 2023
- Quarter-finalist (2): 2021, 2024

== Season-by-season ==
Championship season
Runners-up season

=== BAL ===
Season	League		Regular season					Postseason	Head coach	Captain
Season	League	Conference	Finish	Played	Wins	Losses	Win %	Postseason	Head coach	Captain
AS Douanes
2021	BAL	Group C	3rd	1	1	2	.333	Lost quarterfinals (Monastir) 62–86	Pabi Guèye	Alkaly Ndour
2022	Did not qualify								Pabi Guèye	Alkaly Ndour
2023	BAL	Sahara	2nd	5	3	2	.600	Won quarterfinals (Beira) 93–73; Won semifinal (Petro) 88–84; Lost finals (Al Ahly) 75–80	Pabi Guèye	Alkaly Ndour
2024	BAL	Sahara	2nd	6	3	3	.500	Won seeding game (Rivers Hoopers) 63–57; Lost quarterfinals (Petro) 65–66	Pabi Guèye	Alkaly Ndour
Season record				14	7	7	.500			
Playoffs record				6	3	3	.500			

=== Nationale 1 ===
Season	Group	Regular season				Playoffs
Season	Group	Finish	Wins	Losses	Pct.	Playoffs
AS Douanes
2019	–	1st	14	2	.875	Won semifinals (SLBC) 2–1; Won final (DUC) 61–54
2020	Cancelled due to the COVID-19 pandemic					
2021	Group A	1st	12	2	.857	Won quarterfinals (UGB) 2–0; Won semifinals (ASCVD) 2–1; Lost final (DUC) 66–65
2022	Group B	1st	12	1	.923	Won quarterfinals (US Rail) 2–0; Won semifinal (JA) 2–0; Won finals (DUC) 2–0
2023	Group A	1st	14	0	1.000	Won quarterfinals (Larry Diouf) 2–0; Won semifinals (ASCVD) 2–0; Won final (JA) 2–1
2024	Group A	2nd	12	0	1.000	1st in Final Eight Group A (5–1) Lost semifinals (DUC) 1–2
Regular season record			64	5	.928	
Playoff record			25	7	.781	
