= 2021 Egyptian Basketball Super League Finals =

Team	Coach	Wins
Zamalek	Augustí Julbe	3
Al Ittihad	Ahmed Marei	2
- Dates: June 20–28
- MVP: Anas Mahmoud
- Semifinalists: Zamalek defeated Gezira 3–0. Al Ittihad defeated Al Ahly 3–0.

2021 Egyptian Basketball Super League Finals was a final between the two top Egyptian basketball teams and the winners of the previous two championships, 2018-19, 2019-20 respectively, Zamalek and Al Ittihad. Before this final, Zamalek won 14 league titles and Al Ittihad won 13, Egyptian League. The final is played in a best of five, for the third time in a row. Zamalek won 2020-21 and crowned the 15th title of Egyptian Basketball Super League

== Zamalek ==
Zamalek finished with the league's in 2nd place, finished the season with a 11–3, in Quarter-finals matchup with Al Ittisalat, Zamalek won 3 Game, And winning the series 3–1. in Semi-finals matchup with Gezira, Zamalek won 3 Game, And winning the series 3–0.

== Al Ittihad ==
Al Ittihad finished with the league's in 1st place, finished the season with a 12–2, in Quarter-finals matchup with Al Geish Army, Al Ittihad won 3 Game, And winning the series 3–0. in Semi-finals matchup with Al Ahly Al Ittihad won 3 Game, And winning the series 3–0.

== Regular season series ==
The Two Team Tied in the regular season series 1–1.

February 2, 2021

Recap

Al Ittihad 87, Zamalek 88

Abdelrahman Fawzy Hall

March 22, 2021

Recap

Al Ittihad 83, Zamalek 74

Kamal Shalaby Hall

== Road To Final ==
The playoffs started on 16 April 2021.

=== Bracket ===
Quarter-finals
1	Al Ittihad	3
8	Al Geish Army	0
4	Al Ahly	3
5	Sporting Alexandria	1
2	Zamalek	3
7	Al Ittisalat	1
3	Gezira	3
6	Smouha	0

Semi-finals
1	Al Ittihad	3
4	Al Ahly	0
2	Zamalek	3
3	Gezira	0

Finals
1	Al Ittihad	2
2	Zamalek	3

== Series summary ==
Game	Date	Away team	Result	Home team
Game 1	Sunday, June 20	Zamalek	56–83 (0–1)	Al Ittihad
Game 2	Tuesday, June 22	Zamalek	80–70 (1-1)	Al Ittihad
Game 3	Thursday, June 24	Al Ittihad	69-74 (1–2)	Zamalek
Game 4	Saturday, June 26	Al Ittihad	81-79 (2–2)	Zamalek
Game 5	Monday, June 28	Zamalek	84-80 (3–2)	Al Ittihad

== Game summaries ==
=== Game 1 ===
On Time Sports

Sunday, June 20
7:00pm

RecapBox Score

Zamalek	56–83	Al Ittihad
Scoring by quarter: 14–23, 14–15, 13–22, 15–23
Pts: Mostafa Kejo 13; Rebs: Mostafa Kejo 13; Asts: Omar Hesham 4		Pts: Rami Ibrahim 19; Rebs: Somaa 7 Asts: Somaa 4
Al Ittihad leads series, 1–0

Cairo, Hassan Moustafa Sports Hall

=== Game 2 ===
On Time Sports

Tuesday, June 22
7:00pm

RecapBox Score

Zamalek	80–70	Al Ittihad
Scoring by quarter: 18-11, 24-19, 20-15, 18–25
Pts: Mohab Yasser 23; Rebs: Anas Osama 10; Asts: Anas Osama 7		Pts: Somaa 18; Rebs: Haytham Kamal 8 Asts: Marvelle Harris 7
Zamalek Tied series, 1–1

Cairo, Hassan Moustafa Sports Hall

=== Game 3 ===
On Time Sports

Thursday, June 24
7:00pm

RecapBox Score

Zamalek	74–69	Al Ittihad
Scoring by quarter: 12-20, 22-8, 14-18, 24-23
Pts: Walter Hodge 28; Rebs: Anas Osama 11; Asts: Anas Osama 5		Pts: Marvelle Harris 22; Rebs: Somaa 5 Asts: Somaa 4
Zamalek Leads series, 2–1

Cairo, Hassan Moustafa Sports Hall

=== Game 4 ===
On Time Sports

Saturday, June 26
7:00pm

RecapBox Score

Zamalek	79–81	Al Ittihad
Scoring by quarter: 20-19, 16–23, 24-20, 19-19
Pts: Walter Hodge 21; Rebs: Anas Osama 9 Asts: Anas Osama 8		Pts: Mido Taha 20; Rebs: Somaa 14; Asts: Somaa 3
Al Ittihad Tied series, 2-2

Cairo, Hassan Moustafa Sports Hall

=== Game 5 ===
On Time Sports

Monday, June 28
7:00pm

RecapBox Score

Zamalek	84–80 (OT) (OT)	Al Ittihad
Scoring by quarter: 25-29, 23-13, 14-25, 21-16, Overtime: 11-7
Pts: Walter Hodge 21; Rebs: Anas Osama 13; Asts: Anas Osama 5		Pts: Haytham Kamal 22; Rebs: Somaa 9 Asts: Somaa 6
Zamalek wins the series, 3–2

Cairo, Hassan Moustafa Sports Hall

== Player statistics ==
Legend
GP	Games played	GS	Games started	MPG	Minutes per game
FG%	Field-goal percentage	3P%	3-point field-goal percentage	FT%	Free-throw percentage
RPG	Rebounds per game	APG	Assists per game	SPG	Steals per game
BPG	Blocks per game	PPG	Points per game

Zamalek Sc statistics
Player	GP	GS	MPG	FG%	3P%	FT%	RPG	APG	SPG	BPG	PPG
Walter Hodge	5	5	00.0	.000	.000	.000	1.6	3.4	1.4	0.0	19
Mohamed Mostafa	5	0	00.0	.000	.000	.000	3.8	0.2	0.8	0.0	2.8
Mohab Yasser	5	5	00.0	.000	.000	.000	4.6	1.2	1.8	0.2	12.2
Anas Osama	5	5	00.0	.000	.000	.000	10	5.4	1.2	1.6	6.4
Moustafa Kejoo	5	5	00.0	.000	.000	.000	7.6	0.8	0.6	0.0	10
Islam Salem	5	5	00.0	.000	.000	.000	2.8	2.0	1.0	0.0	11.6
Omar Hesham	5	0	00.0	.000	.000	.000	2.8	2.0	0.2	0.0	2.6
Adham Essam	2	0	00.0	.000	.000	.000	0.0	0.0	0.0	0.0	0.0
Ahmed Hatem	5	0	00.0	.000	.000	.000	1.2	0.4	0.4	0.0	4.4
Ahmed Yasser	5	0	00.0	.000	.000	.000	1.6	0.0	0.6	0.2	4.4
Mostafa Mashaal	2	0	00.0	.000	.000	.000	1.5	1.0	0.0	0.0	3.0
