= 2024–25 Egyptian Basketball Premier League =

Egyptian Basketball Premier League
- Season: 2024–25
- Dates: 10 – 26 January 2025 (regular season); 24 April – 1 June 2025 (playoffs)
- Teams: 16

Regular season
- Season MVP: Ehab Amin

Finals
- Champions: Al Ahly (8th title)
- Runners-up: Al Ittihad Alexandria

The 2024–25 Egyptian Basketball Premier League was the 50th season of the Premier League, the top level of professional basketball in Egypt. The season began on 10 January 2025 and finished on 1 June 2025.

Al Ittihad Alexandria were the defending champions, but lost to Al Ahly in the finals, who won their eight championship. As champions, Al Ahly qualified for the 2026 BAL season. Ehab Amin was named Most Valuable Player for a record third time.

== Teams ==
| ▲ Promoted from Second Division | ▼ Relegated from 2023–24 Egyptian Basketball Premier League |
|---|---|
| Damanhour; Tram | Eastern Company; Olympic |

== Preliminary round ==
=== Group 1 ===
| Pos | Team | Pld | W | L | Pts | Qualification |
|---|---|---|---|---|---|---|
| 1 | Al Ahly | 4 | 4 | 0 | 8 | Qualified for Super League |
| 2 | Smouha | 4 | 2 | 2 | 6 | Qualified for Super League |
| 3 | Al Geish | 4 | 1 | 3 | 5 | Qualified for 9th–16th place round |
| 4 | Desoq | 5 | 0 | 5 | 5 | Qualified for 9th–16th place round |

Source: Afrobasket

=== Group 2 ===
| Pos | Team | Pld | W | L | Pts | Qualification |
|---|---|---|---|---|---|---|
| 1 | Al Ittihad | 4 | 4 | 0 | 8 | Qualified for Super League |
| 2 | Heliopolis | 5 | 3 | 2 | 8 | Qualified for Super League |
| 3 | Al Zohour | 5 | 2 | 3 | 7 | Qualified for 9th–16th place round |
| 4 | Misr Insurance | 4 | 1 | 3 | 5 | Qualified for 9th–16th place round |

Source: Afrobasket

=== Group 3 ===
| Pos | Team | Pld | W | L | Pts | Qualification |
|---|---|---|---|---|---|---|
| 1 | Al Gezira | 4 | 4 | 0 | 8 | Qualified for Super League |
| 2 | Sporting | 5 | 3 | 2 | 8 | Qualified for Super League |
| 3 | El Tayaran | 5 | 3 | 2 | 8 | Qualified for 9th–16th place round |
| 4 | Olympic | 5 | 1 | 4 | 6 | Qualified for 9th–16th place round |

Source: Afrobasket

=== Group 4 ===
| Pos | Team | Pld | W | L | Pts | Qualification |
|---|---|---|---|---|---|---|
| 1 | Al Ittisalat | 4 | 3 | 1 | 7 | Qualified for Super League |
| 2 | Zamalek | 4 | 3 | 1 | 7 | Qualified for Super League |
| 3 | Horse Owners' Club | 5 | 1 | 4 | 6 | Qualified for 9th–16th place round |
| 4 | Haia Al Qaina | 5 | 1 | 4 | 6 | Qualified for 9th–16th place round |

Source: Afrobasket

== Super League ==
| Pos | Team | Pld | W | L | PF | PA | PD | Pts | Qualification |
|---|---|---|---|---|---|---|---|---|---|
| 1 | Al Ahly C. | 5 | 5 | 0 | 398 | 339 | +59 | 10 | Qualified for playoffs |
| 2 | Al Ittihad Al. | 5 | 4 | 1 | 466 | 372 | +94 | 9 | Qualified for playoffs |
| 3 | Zamalek | 5 | 4 | 1 | 420 | 329 | +91 | 9 | Qualified for playoffs |
| 4 | Al Ittisalat | 5 | 2 | 3 | 346 | 388 | −42 | 7 | Qualified for playoffs |
| 5 | Al Gezira | 5 | 1 | 4 | 345 | 402 | −57 | 6 | Qualified for playoffs |
| 6 | Sporting | 5 | 2 | 3 | 387 | 395 | −8 | 7 | Qualified for playoffs |
| 7 | Heliopolis | 5 | 2 | 3 | 359 | 374 | −15 | 7 | Qualified for playoffs |
| 8 | Al Geish | 5 | 0 | 5 | 303 | 425 | −122 | 5 | |

Source: Afrobasket

== 9th-16th place round ==
| Pos | Team | Pld | W | L | PF | PA | PD | Pts | Qualification |
|---|---|---|---|---|---|---|---|---|---|
| 1 | Smouha | 5 | 5 | 0 | 396 | 328 | +68 | 10 | Qualified for playoffs |
| 2 | Al Shams | 5 | 2 | 3 | 336 | 366 | −30 | 7 | |
| 3 | Damanhour | 5 | 4 | 1 | 359 | 346 | +13 | 9 | |
| 4 | Horse Owners' Club | 5 | 0 | 5 | 309 | 328 | −19 | 5 | |
| 5 | Misr Insurance | 5 | 3 | 2 | 345 | 318 | +27 | 8 | |
| 6 | Al Zohour | 5 | 2 | 3 | 324 | 347 | −23 | 7 | |
| 7 | El Tayaran | 5 | 4 | 1 | 304 | 281 | +23 | 9 | |
| 8 | Tram SC | 5 | 0 | 5 | 298 | 357 | −59 | 5 | |

Source: Afrobasket

== Playoffs ==
The playoffs began on 24 April and ended on 1 June 2025.

Quarterfinals
1 | Al Ahly | 3
8 | Heliopolis | 0
4 | Zamalek | 3
5 | Al Ittisalat | 0
2 | Al Ittihad A | 3
7 | Smouha | 0
3 | Sporting | 3
6 | Al Gezira | 2

Semifinals
1 | Al Ahly | 3
4 | Zamalek | 2
2 | Al Ittihad | 3
3 | Sporting | 1

Finals
1 | Al Ahly | 3
2 | Al Ittihad | 2
