= 2022–23 Egyptian Basketball Premier League =

Egyptian Basketball Premier League
- Season: 2022–23
- Dates: 16 December 2022 - 15 May 2023
- Teams: 16

Regular season
- Season MVP: Ehab Amin (Al Ahly)
- Relegated: Desouk; Horse Owners' Club

Finals
- Champions: Al Ahly (7th title)
- Runners-up: Al Ittihad

The 2022–23 Egyptian Basketball Premier League was the 48th season of the Premier League, the top level of professional basketball in Egypt. The preliminary round began on 16 December 2022, with six-teen teams making up the league. The season ended on 15 May 2023 with the final game of the finals.

Al Ahly were the defending champions, having won the 2021–22 season. Al Ahly defeated Al Ittihad 3–1 in the finals, to win their seventh Premier League title.

== Teams ==
▲ Promoted from 2021 to 2022 Second Division	▼ Relegated from 2021–22 Super League
Desouk Al Zohor	Tanta El Shams

== Preliminary round ==
The teams were matched based on their rankings in the 2021–22 Egyptian Basketball Super League, with the 1st ranked team playing the 16th ranked team, and so forth.

The winners of the preliminary round were placed in the Super League, while the losing teams played in the bottom group.

The preliminary round began on 16 December and ended on 19 December 2022.

Team 1	Series	Team 2	Game 1	Game 2	Game 3
Desouk	0–2	Smouha	63–86	59–91	–
Al Ittihad Alexandria	2–0	Suez Canal SC	97–57	86–64	–
Gezira	2–0	Olympic Club	66–56	77–63	–
Zamalek	2–0	Aviation Club	75–71	74–64	–
Al Ahly	2–0	Al Zohor	92–49	92–62	–
Sporting Alexandria	0–2	Egypt Insurance	76–78	60–69	–
Telecom Egypt	2–0	Horse Owners' Club	80–67	71–66	–
El Gaish Army	2–0	Heliopolis	65–62	67–64	–

== Regular season ==
=== Standings ===
The teams ranked 1st–8th played in the Super League (or Top Group), while the teams 9th–16th played in the bottom group.

Advance to quarterfinals
Advance to play-in
Advance to classification rounds

=== Super League ===
Pos	2022–23 Super League regular season						
Pos	Team	Pld	W	L	PF	PA	PD
1	Al Ittihad Alexandria	14	13	1	1171	892	279
2	Al Ahly	14	13	1	1133	869	264
3	Zamalek	14	9	5	1081	1044	37
4	Gezira	14	7	7	1025	1018	7
5	Smouha	14	5	9	968	1013	–45
6	El Gaish Army	14	5	9	979	1102	–123
7	Telecom Egypt	14	3	11	966	1090	–124
8	Egypt Insurance	14	1	13	812	1107	–295

Source: Goalzz.com

=== Bottom Group ===
Pos	2022–23 Super League regular season						
Pos	Team	Pld	W	L	PF	PA	PD
9	Alexandria Sporting Club	14	12	2	1023	895	128
10	Suez Canal SC	13	9	4	986	872	114
11	Heliopolis	14	9	5	907	913	–6
12	Horse Owners' Club	14	7	7	972	977	–5
13	Aviation Club	13	7	6	1022	968	54
14	Al Zohor	14	6	8	1006	1035	–29
15	Olympic Club	14	5	9	982	988	–6
16	Desouk	14	0	14	929	1179	–250

Source: Goalzz.com

== Playoffs ==
The playoffs began with the 7th-9th place classification round on 17 March 2023 and ended on 15 May 2023 with the final game of the finals.

Play-in
8	Egypt Insurance	64	47	0
9	Sporting Alexandria	88	70	2
7	Telecom Egypt	68	88	2
10	Suez Canal SC	63	63	0

Quarterfinals
1	Al Ittihad Alexandria	79	91	98	3
9	Sporting Alexandria	69	75	53	0
4	Gezira	68	72	75	76	1
5	Smouha	56	73	76	78	3
2	Al Ahly	106	86	95	3
7	Telecom Egypt	62	76	60	0
3	Zamalek	83	81	78	76	78	3
6	Al Geish Army	65	75	84	97	63	2

Semifinals
1	Al Ittihad	97	108	108	3
5	Smouha	54	79	66	0
2	Al Ahly	71	79	91	3
3	Zamalek	62	48	57	0

Finals
1	Al Ittihad	62	80	58	70	1
2	Al Ahly	69	62	67	72	3

== Classification rounds ==
The classification games were held in a best-of-three series format and were played from 26 March to 31 March 2023. The losers of the four games had to play the relegation rounds.

Team 1	Series	Team 2	Game 1	Game 2	Game 3	Game 4	Game 5
Heliopolis	3–0	Al Zohor	71–58	63–56	78–74	–	–
Egypt Insurance	3–0	Desouk	83–50	62–60	95–81	–	
Aviation Club	3–1	Horse Owners' Club	70–68	88–80	53–73	82–74	
Suez Canal SC	3–0	Olympic Club	63–60	55–47	75–81	–	

== Relegation round ==
Relegation to Division B

The relegation round games were played on 9, 10 and 11 April 2023.

Pos	2022–23 Premier League relegation round						
Pos	Team	Pld	W	L	PF	PA	PD
1	Al Zohor	3	3	0	239	218	+21
2	Olympic Club	3	1	2	212	207	+5
3	Desouk	3	1	2	221	232	–11
4	Horse Owners' Club	3	1	2	236	251	–15
