= 2021–22 Egyptian Basketball Premier League =

47th season of the Egyptian Basketball Premier League

Egyptian Basketball Premier League
- Season: 2021–22
- Dates: 26 November 2021 – 16 May 2022
- Teams: 16

Regular season
- Season MVP: Ehab Amin (Al Ahly)

Finals
- Champions: Al Ahly (6th title)
- Runners-up: Al Ittihad Alexandria
- Semi-finalists: Zamalek; Gezira

The 2021–22 Egyptian Basketball Premier League was the 47th season of the Egyptian Basketball Premier League, the highest-level basketball league in Egypt. The defending champions were Zamalek; they were eliminated in the semifinals by Al Ittihad Alexandria.

The season began on 26 September 2021 and finished on 16 May 2022. Al Ahly won its sixth league title (its first since 2016); they qualify for the regular season of the 2023 season of the Basketball Africa League (BAL).

== Teams ==
=== Team changes ===
▲ Promoted from 2020–21 Second Division	▼ Relegated from 2020–21 Super League
Heliopolis El Shams	Al Zohor Geziret El Ward

Sixteen teams competed in this season – the top fourteen of the previous season and two teams that were promoted from the Egyptian Second Division. Heliopolis and Al Shams joined as promoted teams. Al Zohour and Geziret El-Ward were relegated from the 2020-21 season.

=== Arenas and locations ===
Club	Location	Venue
Al Ahly	Cairo	Al Ahly Sports Hall
Al Ittihad	Alexandria	Kamal Shalaby Hall
Al Gaish Army	Cairo	Tala'ea El Gaish Hall
Aviation Club	Cairo	
Egypt Insurance	Cairo	The Arab Contractors Hall
El Shams	Cairo	Al Shams Sporting Club
Gezira	Cairo (Zamalek)	Cairo Stadium
Horse Owners' Club	Alexandria	
Heliopolis	Cairo	Heliopolis Hall
Olympi	Alexandria	El Olympi Arena
Smouha	Alexandria	Smouha Arena
Sporting Alexandria	Alexandria	Sporting Club Hall
Suez Canal SC	Ismailia	
Tanta	Tanta	Tanta Arena
Telecom Egypt	Cairo	
Zamalek	Giza	Abdulrahman Fawzi Hall

== System ==
The Premier League is the basic and qualifying league for the Basketball Africa League (BAL). The league consists of three stages:

1. The preliminary stage: where 1 meets 16, 2 meets 15, and so on in terms of ranking in the Mortabt-League.
2. The regular league: After the rise of eight teams compete among themselves In back and forth matches.
3. Playoffs stage: It starts from the final round, where the 1st place holder of the regular league meets the 8th place holder in a series of three matches, then the semi-finals and the final is a series of 5 matches.

== Preliminary stage ==
=== Ranking of incoming teams ===
The first-placed team in the league will meet the 16th-ranked team, the second will meet the 15th, and so on.

- Mortabt-League teams ranking

Rank	Team
1	Al Ahly
2	Al Ittihad
3	Smouha
4	Gezira
5	Zamalek
6	Egypt Insurance
7	Sporting Alexandria
8	Telecom Egypt
9	Heliopolis
10	Al Gaish Army
11	Horse Owners' Club
12	Olympic
13	Aviation Club
14	Tanta
15	El Shams
16	Suez Canal SC

=== Matches ===
Team 1	Series	Team 2	Game 1	Game 2	Game 3
Al Ahly	2–0	Suez Canal SC	80-70	80-69	
Al Ittihad	2–0	El Shams	95–53	85-61	
Smouha	2–1	Tanta	80–56	46-60	92-82
Gezira	2–0	Aviation Club	76–43	63-56	
Zamalek	2–0	Olympic Club	80–62	74-56	
Egypt Insurance	2–1	Horse Owners' Club	78–81	71-63	57-55
Sporting Alexandria	2–0	Al Geish Army	72-60	72-61	
Telecom Egypt	2–1	Heliopolis	85–54	66-73	92-55

Source:https://www.goalzz.com/main.aspx?c=23217 Goalzz.com

=== Results ===
Qualified teams	Relegated teams
Zamalek	Olympic Club
Al Ahly	Suez Canal SC
Gezira	Aviation Club
Al Ittihad	El Shams
Sporting Alexandria	Al Gaish Army
Etisalat	Heliopolis
Smouha	Tanta
Egypt Insurance	Horse Owners' Club

== Regular season ==
=== Top Group ===
Pos	Team	Pld	W	L	PF	PA	PD	Pts	Qualification
1	Al Ittihad	14	11	3	1169	1037	+132	22	Advance to playoffs
2	Al Ahly	14	11	3	1150	999	+151	22	Advance to playoffs
3	Gezira	14	10	4	1001	972	+29	20	Advance to playoffs
4	Etisalat	14	7	7	1120	1082	+38	14	Advance to playoffs
5	Zamalek	14	6	8	1036	1055	−19	12	Advance to playoffs
6	Sporting Alexandria	14	5	9	1035	1085	−50	10	Advance to playoffs
7	Egypt Insurance	14	3	11	977	1119	−142	6	Advance to playoffs
8	Smouha	14	3	11	977	1119	−142	6	Advance to playoffs

Source: Egyptian Basketball Federation

==== Results ====
Home \ Away	ZAM	ITT	GEZ	ETI	ZAM	SPA	SMO	ETI	Tam
Zamalek	—	65–88	85–71	70–78			72–74	70–78	80–62
Al Ittihad	85–78	—	71–61	75–96	85–78	83–75	91–78	75–96	
Gezira	70–56		—		70–56		71–51		84–60
Etisalat		80–75	75–77	—		69–65			
Zamalek		65–88	85–71	70–78	—		72–74	70–78	80–62
Sporting Alexandria	74–71		71–77		74–71	—	77–70		70–60
Smouha			69–71	96–88			—	96–88	77–89
Etisalat		80–75	75–77			69–65		—	
Egypt Insurance		79–97		64–78		75–87	80–67	64–78	—

Updated to match(es) played on unknown. Source: Goalzz.com
Legend: Blue = home team win; Red = away team win.

=== Bottom Group ===
Pos	Team	Pld	W	L	PF	PA	PD	Pts	Relegation
1	Al Gaish Army	14	11	3	1060	877	+183	22	
2	Heliopolis	14	9	5	903	924	−21	18	
3	Tanta (R)	14	8	6	937	955	−18	16	Relegated to Egyptian Second League
4	Olympic Club	14	6	8	981	926	+55	12	
5	Horse Owners' Club	14	6	8	1003	1010	−7	12	
6	Suez Canal SC	14	6	8	961	992	−31	12	
7	El Shams (R)	14	6	8	914	952	−38	12	Relegated to Egyptian Second League
8	Aviation Club	14	4	10	895	982	−87	8	

Source: Goalzz.com
(R) Relegated

== Playoffs ==
The playoffs began on 19 March 2022 and ended on 16 May 2022. All three rounds are played in a best-of-five format.

=== Bracket ===
Quarterfinals
1	Al Ittihad	3
8	Smouha	0
4	Etisalat	1
5	Zamalek	3
2	Al Ahly	3
7	Egypt Insurance	0
3	Gezira	3
6	Sporting Alexandria	1

Semifinals
1	Al Ittihad	3
5	Zamalek	0
2	Al Ahly	3
3	Gezira	0

Finals
1	Al Ittihad	2
2	Al Ahly	3

=== Quarterfinals ===
The quarterfinals were played on 19, 21, 24, 26 and 28 March 2022.

Team 1	Series	Team 2	Game 1	Game 2	Game 3	Game 4	Game 5
Al Ittihad	3–0	Smouha	85–67	87–76	89–78		
Etisalat	1–3	Zamalek	80–67	84–85	73–75	67–71	
Al Ahly	3–0	Egypt Insurance	84–49	81–46	78–57		
Gezira	3–1	Sporting Alexandria	66–59	73–59	57–68	72–58	

=== Semifinals ===
The semifinals were played on 22, 24 and 26 April 2022.

Team 1	Series	Team 2	Game 1	Game 2	Game 3	Game 4	Game 5
Al Ittihad	3–0	Zamalek	97–53	73–68	79–59		
Al Ahly	3–0	Gezira	80–61	76–62	87-65		

=== Finals ===
The finals were played on 8 May, 10 May, 12 May (also 14 May and 16 May if necessary). All games were hosted at the Hassan Moustafa Sports Hall.

Team 1	Series	Team 2	Game 1	Game 2	Game 3	Game 4	Game 5
Al Ittihad	2–3	Al Ahly	86–77^{OT}	60–73	60–63	85–75	73–86

== Individual awards ==
Category	Player	Team(s)	Ref.
Most Valuable Player	Ehab Amin	Al Ahly	
