= 2020–21 Egyptian Basketball Premier League =

Egyptian Basketball Premier League
- Season: 2020–21
- Teams: 16

Regular season
- BAL: Zamalek
- Season MVP: Anas Mahmoud (Zamalek)

Finals
- Champions: Zamalek (15th title)
- Runners-up: Al Ittihad
- Semifinalists: Al Ahly; Gezira

Statistical leaders
- Points: Haytham Kamal (Al Ittihad)

The 2020–21 Egyptian Basketball Premier League was the 47th season of the Egyptian Basketball Premier League. The champions qualify for the 2022 Basketball Africa League (BAL) season. Zamalek won its 14th national title, after winning in the finals Against Al Ittihad. The season was decided in Game 5, which Zamalek won 84–80 after overtime.

== Teams ==
6th of October and El Shams were relegated from the 2019–20 Egyptian Basketball Super League. Geziret El-Ward and Al Zohour joined the league after promoting from the second tier league. The 2020–21 season existed out of the following 16 teams:

=== Arenas and locations ===
Club	Location	Venue
Al Ahly	Cairo	Al Ahly Sports Hall
Al Ittihad	Alexandria	Kamal Shalaby Hall
Telecom Egypt	Cairo	
Horse Owners' Club	Alexandria	
Al Zohour	Cairo (Nasr City)	
Suez Canal SC	Ismailia	
Misr Insurance	Alexandria	The Arab Contractors Hall
Al Gaish Army	Cairo	Tala'ea El Gaish Hall
Aviation Club	Cairo	
Gezira	Cairo (Zamalek)	Cairo Stadium (Hall 2)
Geziret El Ward	Mansoura	
Olympic Club	Alexandria	El Olympi Arena
Smouha	Alexandria	Smouha Arena
Sporting Alexandria	Alexandria	Sporting Club Hall
Tanta	Tanta	Tanta Arena
Zamalek	Cairo (Zamalek)	Abdulrahman Fawzi Hall

== Regular season ==
=== Top Group ===
Pos	Team	Pld	W	L	PF	PA	PD	Pts	Qualification
1	Al Ittihad	14	12	2	1217	1036	+181	24	Advance to playoffs
2	Zamalek	14	11	3	1065	988	+77	22	Advance to playoffs
3	Gezira	14	10	4	1096	1303	−207	20	Advance to playoffs
4	Al Ahly	14	8	6	1080	1009	+71	16	Advance to playoffs
5	Sporting Alexandria	14	5	9	991	1033	−42	10	Advance to playoffs
6	Smouha	14	5	9	1044	1094	−50	10	Advance to playoffs
7	Etisalat	14	3	11	1015	1163	−148	6	Advance to playoffs
8	Al Geish Army	14	2	12	970	1122	−152	4	Advance to playoffs

Source: Goalzz.com

=== Bottom Group ===
Pos	Team	Pld	W	L	PF	PA	PD	Pts	Qualification
1	Tanta	14	10	4	1052	1009	+43	20	
2	Suez Canal SC	14	9	5	1121	1027	+94	18	
3	Egypt Insurance	14	9	5	1017	979	+38	18	
4	Horse Owners' Club	14	9	5	1052	1009	+43	18	
5	Olympic Club	14	8	6	1064	1052	+12	16	
6	Aviation Club	14	5	9	853	933	−80	10	
7	Al Zohor (R)	14	3	11	1088	1163	−75	6	Relegated to Egyptian Second League
8	Geziret El Ward (R)	14	3	11	965	1050	−85	6	Relegated to Egyptian Second League

Source: Goalzz.com
(R) Relegated

== Playoffs ==
The playoffs started on 16 April 2021.

=== Bracket ===
Quarter-finals
1	Al Ittihad	3
8	Al Geish Army	0
4	Al Ahly	3
5	Sporting Alexandria	1
2	Zamalek	3
7	Al Ittisalat	1
3	Gezira	3
6	Smouha	0

Semi-finals
1	Al Ittihad	3
4	Al Ahly	0
2	Zamalek	3
3	Gezira	0

Finals
1	Al Ittihad	2
2	Zamalek	3

== Individual awards ==
The awards were announced on 28 June 2021:

- Most Valuable Player: Anas Mahmoud (Zamalek)
- Best Young Player: Mohab Yasser (Zamalek)
- Top Scorer: Haytham Kamal (Al Ittihad)
- Best Threepoint Shooter: Rami Ibrahim (Al Ittihad)
