= 2019–20 Egyptian Basketball Premier League =

- Season: 2019–20
- Dates: 10 December 2019 – 10 September 2020
- Teams: 16

Regular season
- BAL: Al Ittihad
- Season MVP: Ismail Ahmad (Al Ittihad)

Finals
- Champions: Al Ittihad; 15th title
- Runners-up: Al Ahly

Statistical leaders
- Points: Ehab Amin (Al Ahly)

The 2019–20 Egyptian Basketball Super League was the 46th season of the Egyptian Basketball Premier League. The season started on 10 December 2019 and ended on 10 September 2020. The champions qualified for the 2021 Basketball Africa League (BAL).

On 15 March 2020, the season was suspended due to the COVID-19 pandemic. The season resumed 16 August 2020.

Al Ittihad won its fifteenth national title.

== Teams ==
The 2019–20 season existed out of the following 16 teams:

=== Arenas and locations ===
Club	Location	Venue	Capacity
6th of October	6th of October	6th of October Sports Hall	5,500
Al Ahly	Cairo	Al Ahly Sports Hall	2,500
Al Ittihad	Alexandria	Kamal Shalaby Hall	
Horse Owners' Club	Alexandria		
Egypt Insurance	Cairo		
Al Gaish Army	Cairo	Tala'ea El Gaish Hall	
El Shams	Cairo		
Aviation Club	Cairo		
Telecom Egypt	Cairo		
Gezira	Cairo (Zamalek)	Cairo Stadium Indoor Halls Complex	1,620
Suez Canal SC	Ismailia	Suez Canal Authority Arena	
Olympi	Alexandria	El Olympi Arena	
Smouha	Alexandria	Smouha Arena	
Sporting Alexandria	Alexandria	Sporting Club Hall	
Tanta	Tanta	Tanta Arena	
Zamalek	Giza	Abdelrahman Fawzy Hall	4,000

== Regular season ==
=== Top Group ===
Pos	Team	Pld	W	L	PF	PA	PD	Pts	Qualification
1	Al Ittihad	14	12	2	1176	989	+187	24	Advance to playoffs
2	Al Ahly	14	11	3	1089	981	+108	22	Advance to playoffs
3	Gezira	14	10	4	1143	991	+152	20	Advance to playoffs
4	Sporting Alexandria	14	7	7	1063	1059	+4	14	Advance to playoffs
5	Zamalek	14	7	7	1066	1059	+7	14	Advance to playoffs
6	Smouha	14	6	8	1088	1150	−62	12	Advance to playoffs
7	Egypt Insurance	14	2	12	920	1119	−199	4	Advance to playoffs
8	Al Geish Army	14	1	13	906	1070	−164	2	Advance to playoffs

Source: Goalzz.com

=== Bottom Group ===
Pos	Team	Pld	W	L	PF	PA	PD	Pts	Qualification
1	Olympic Club	14	10	4	1113	1048	+65	20	
2	Tanta	14	8	6	1135	1065	+70	16	
3	Telecom Egypt	14	8	6	986	983	+3	16	
4	Horse Owners' Club	14	8	6	1013	968	+45	16	
5	Aviation Club	14	7	7	1024	1065	−41	14	
6	Suez Canal SC	14	6	8	954	986	−32	12	
7	El Shams (R)	14	7	7	985	1015	−30	14	Relegated to Egyptian Second League
8	6th of October (R)	14	3	11	1067	1147	−80	6	Relegated to Egyptian Second League

Source: Goalzz.com
(R) Relegated

== Playoffs ==
=== Bracket ===
Quarter-finals
1	Al Ittihad	3
8	Al Geish Army	0
4	Sporting Alexandria	1
5	Zamalek	3
2	Al Ahly	3
7	Egypt Insurance	0
3	Gezira	3
6	Smouha	1

Semi-finals
1	Al Ittihad	3
5	Zamalek	0
2	Al Ahly	3
3	Gezira	1

Finals
1	Al Ittihad	3
2	Al Ahly	1

=== Quarterfinals ===
Team 1	Series	Team 2	Game 1	Game 2	Game 3	Game 4	Game 5
Al Ittihad	3–0	Al Geish Army	80–47	80–62	80–63		
Al Ahly	3–0	Egypt Insurance	73–44	80–46	73–57		
Sporting Alexandria	1–3	Zamalek	82–76	45–62	86–87	68–85	
Gezira	3–1	Smouha	73–68	86–93	70–69	82–80	

=== Semifinals ===
Team 1	Series	Team 2	Game 1	Game 2	Game 3	Game 4	Game 5
Al Ittihad	3–0	Zamalek	92–70	89–80	109–97		
Al Ahly	3–1	Gezira	71–66	75–85	80–74	66–63	

=== Finals ===
Team 1	Series	Team 2	Game 1	Game 2	Game 3	Game 4	Game 5
Al Ittihad	3–1	Al Ahly	101–94	65–76	71–68	81–72	
