= Michael Dixon (basketball) =

American-Georgian basketball player (born 1990)

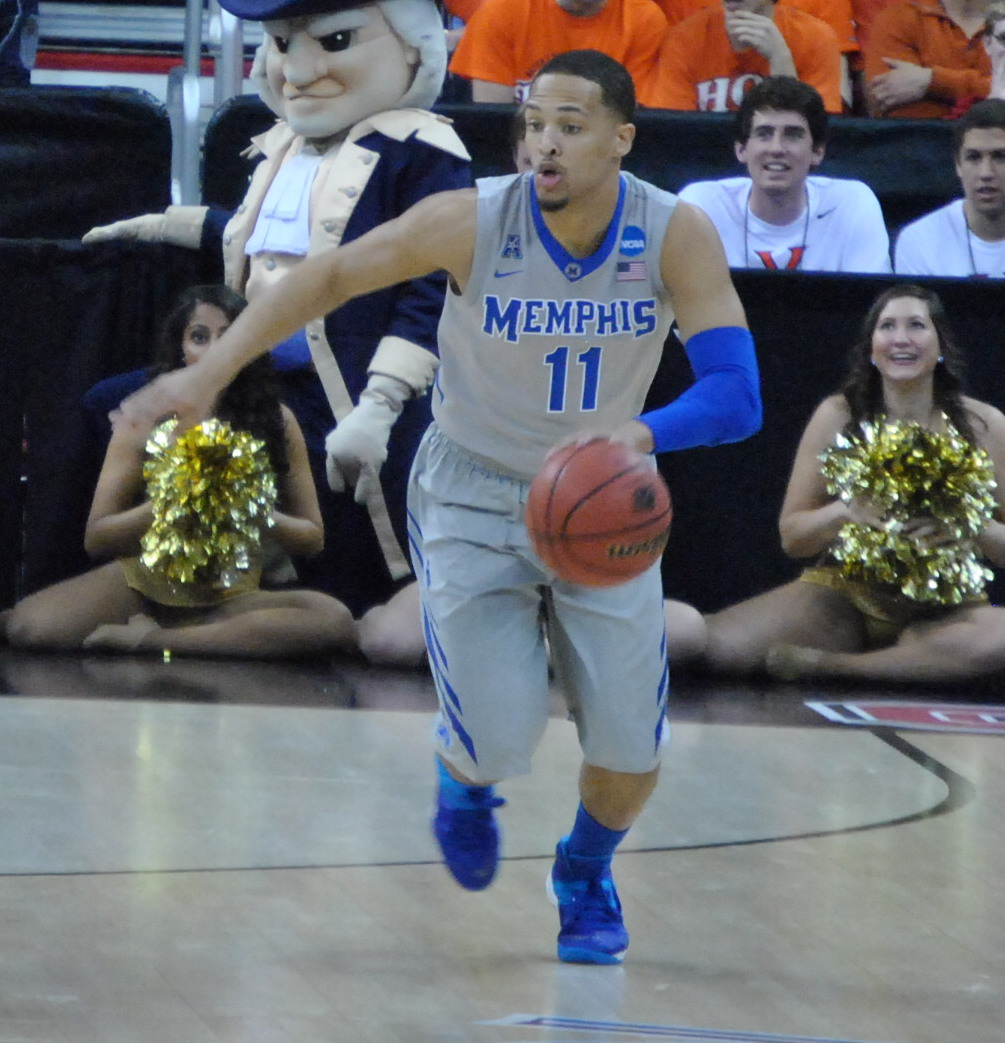
- Dixon playing for Memphis in 2014

No. 1 – Club Africain
- Position: Shooting guard / point guard
- League: Championnat Pro A Basketball Africa League

Personal information
- Born: December 1, 1990 (age 35) Kansas City, Missouri, U.S.
- Listed height: 6 ft 1 in (1.85 m)
- Listed weight: 190 lb (86 kg)

Career information
- High school: Lee's Summit West (Lee's Summit, Missouri)
- College: Missouri (2009–2012); Memphis (2013–2014)
- NBA draft: 2014: undrafted
- Playing career: 2014–present

Career history
- 2014: Dzūkija
- 2014–2015: Pieno žvaigždės
- 2015–2016: Nymburk
- 2016–2017: AEK Athens
- 2017: Strasbourg
- 2017–2018: Bahçeşehir
- 2018–2019: Bnei Herzliya
- 2019: Reggiana
- 2019: Al Ittihad Alexandria
- 2019–2020: Nymburk
- 2020–2021: Titebi
- 2021: U-BT Cluj-Napoca
- 2021: Wilki Morskie Szczecin
- 2022: US Monastir
- 2022: Beirut Club
- 2022–2023: Kolossos Rodou
- 2023: Montreal Alliance
- 2023: Patriots
- 2024: APR
- 2024–present: Al Ittihad Alexandria

Career highlights
- BAL champion (2022); BAL Most Valuable Player (2022); Egyptian League champion (2024); Egypt Cup winner (2024); Tunisian League champion (2022); Tunisian Cup winner (2022); Czech League champion (2016); Lithuanian League All-Star (2015); AAC Sixth Man of the Year (2014); Big 12 Sixth Man of the Year (2012); Big 12 All-Defensive Team (2012); Mr. Show-Me Basketball (2009)

Michael Andre Dixon Jr. (born December 1, 1990) is an American-born naturalised Georgian professional basketball player who currently plays for Club Africain of the Championnat Pro A. He played college basketball for Missouri and Memphis.

Dixon Jr. won the BAL championship in 2022 with US Monastir, and was given league MVP honours.

Following his naturalization in 2016, Dixon has represented the Georgia national team and played with the country at EuroBasket 2017.

== High school career ==
Dixon played high school basketball at Lee's Summit West, in Lee's Summit, Missouri. He was ranked as the nation's 136th overall prospect, and number 22 point guard by Rivals.com.

== College career ==
=== University of Missouri ===
Dixon played college basketball at the University of Missouri, with the Missouri Tigers, from 2009 to 2012. He played in all 34 games as a true freshman, averaging 7.5 points, 1.6 assists, 1.1 rebounds, and 1.0 steals per game. He shot 47.0 percent from the floor overall, 35.5 percent from three-point range, and led the team in free throw shooting, at 85.7 percent. During his second campaign with the Tigers, he started 17 games, averaging 10.3 points per game, along with 2.5 rebounds, 3.5 assists, and 1.8 steals per game. Dixon, was also ranked in the Top 10 of the Big 12 in assists, steals, free throw percentage, and assist/turnover ratio. He was one of the country's most explosive guards, and was arguably college basketball's most valuable sixth man in the 2011–12 season, averaging 13.5 points and 3.3 assists per game, in 35 games (all off the bench).

Dixon was twice accused of sexual assault during his time with Missouri.

=== University of Memphis ===
Dixon transferred to the University of Memphis, where he played his senior year of college basketball with the Memphis Tigers. Dixon saw action in all 34 games, and made four starts. He was the team's second-leading scorer (11.8 points per game) and the squad's leader in three-point field goal percentage (38.6%) and free throw percentage (84.4%). He handed out 81 assists (fourth on team), had 43 steals, and also averaged 2.2 rebounds per game.

== Professional career ==
=== Dzūkija / Pieno žvaigždės (2014–2015) ===
After going undrafted in the 2014 NBA draft, Dixon joined Italian club Basket Barcellona on a 2-week tryout. He left the club without signing a contract with them. Dixon then officially began his pro career in the Lithuanian Basketball League with Dzūkija Alytus, in 2014. He left the team in November, and joined Lithuanian club Pieno žvaigždės Pasvalys for the rest of the season. On March 29, 2015, Dixon participated in the 2015 Lithuanian League All-Star Game, where he recorded nine points, four rebounds and three assists.

Dixon finished the season as the Lithuanian League fourth-leading scorer with 13.7 points per game. Dixon helped žvaigždės to reach the 2015 Baltic League Quarterfinals, but they eventually lost to Juventus.

=== ČEZ Nymburk (2015–2016) ===
On June 22, 2015, Dixon signed with the Czech team ČEZ Nymburk for the 2015–16 season. On January 10, 2016, Dixon recorded a career-high 35 points, shooting 12-of-16 from the field, along with six rebounds, four assists and two steals in a 76–70 win over Nizhny Novgorod.

In 62 games played during the 2015–16 season, he averaged 14.8 points, 3.1 rebounds, 4.6 assists and 1.4 steals, shooting 39.9 percent from 3-point range. Dixon helped Nymburk to win the 2016 Czech League Championship, as well as reaching the 2016 VTB League Playoffs as the eighth seed, but they eventually were eliminated by CSKA Moscow.

=== AEK Athens (2016–2017) ===
On June 21, 2016, Dixon moved to AEK Athens of the Greek League, where he signed a one-year contract with a prospect of renewal for another year. On December 7, 2016, Dixon recorded a season-high 29 points, shooting 8-of-12 from 3-point range, along with five rebounds and four assists in an 89–76 win over Szolnoki Olaj. On January 20, 2017, Dixon agreed to a contract extension with AEK, until the summer of 2019. On April 8, 2017, Dixon recorded 18 points, along with six rebounds and four assists in an 82–81 win over Kolossos Rodou. He was subsequently named Greek League Round 25 MVP.

In 50 games played during the 2016–17 season, he averaged 12.6 points, 2.5 rebounds, 2.5 assists and 1 steal per game. Dixon helped AEK to reach the 2017 Champions League Playoffs, but they eventually lost to Monaco in the quarterfinals.

=== Strasbourg / Bahçeşehir (2017–2018) ===
On August 5, 2017, Dixon parted ways with AEK and signed with French team SIG Strasbourg for the 2017–18 season. On December 9, 2017, he parted ways with Strasbourg. On December 14, 2017, he signed with Bahçeşehir Koleji of the Turkish Basketball First League.

=== Bnei Herzliya (2018–2019) ===
On August 17, 2018, Dixon signed a one-year deal with the Israeli team Bnei Herzliya. In 17 games played for Herzliya, Dixon averaged 12 points, 2.1 rebounds, 4.2 assists and 1.7 steals per game, shooting 41 percent from three-point range. On February 10, 2019, Dixon parted ways with Herzliya.

=== Reggio Emilia (2019) ===
On February 13, 2019, Dixon joined the Italian team Grissin Bon Reggio Emilia for the rest of the season.

=== Nymburk/Georgia (2019–2021) ===
Dixon signed with Nymburk of the National Basketball League (Czech Republic) in 2019. He averaged 11.0 points, 2.6 rebounds, 4.6 assists, and 1.6 steals per game. On December 4, 2020, Dixon signed an open contract with BC Titebi of the Georgian Superliga.

=== Cluj-Napoca (2021) ===
On January 5, 2021, he signed with U-BT Cluj-Napoca of the Liga Națională.

=== Wilki Morskie Szczecin (2021) ===
On July 8, 2021, he signed with Wilki Morskie Szczecin of the PLK.

=== US Monastir (2022) ===
On February 8, 2022, Dixon signed with US Monastir of the Tunisian Championnat National A (CNA) and the Basketball Africa League. He won the CNA championship and Tunisian Cup with Monastir in May 2022. On May 28, 2022, he won the club's first-ever BAL championship with Monastir after winning in the 2022 BAL Finals over Petro de Luanda. Dixon was named the Most Valuable Player after averaging a team-leading 16.5 points and 4.1 assists per game; along with scoring 21 points in the championship game.

=== Kolossos Rodou (2022–2023) ===
On November 26, 2022, Dixon returned to Greece, signing with Kolossos Rodou. In 17 games, he averaged 11.6 points, 1.9 rebounds and 3 assists, playing around 24 minutes per contest.

=== Montreal Alliance (2023) ===
On June 24, 2023, Dixon signed with the Montreal Alliance of the Canadian Elite Basketball League. However, he was released on July 6.

=== Patriots (2023) ===
In August 2023, Dixon joined Rwandan club Patriots BBC of the Rwanda Basketball League (RBL). He made his debut on August 12, scoring a game-high 20 points against rivals APR.

=== APR (2024) ===
In December 2023, Dixon joined the Rwandan national champions APR for their training camp ahead of the 2024 BAL season.

=== Al Ittihad Alexandria (2024–2025) ===
On March 28, 2024, Dixon signed with Al Ittihad Alexandria of the Egyptian Basketball Premier League. On May 2, 2024, Dixon won the Egypt Cup with the team.

=== Club Africain (2025–present) ===
On April 8, 2025, Dixon joined Club Africain of the Tunisian Championnat Pro A. He won the 2024–25 Pro A championship with Club Africain.

== Georgia national team ==
Dixon has citizenship with Georgia, in order to be able to play with the senior men's Georgian national basketball team. He was selected to be in the country's default squad for the EuroBasket 2017 qualification tournament, where he averaged 16.6 points, 3.2 rebounds, and 4.2 assists per game. He also played at EuroBasket 2017.

== Career statistics ==
Legend
GP	Games played	MPG	Minutes per game	FG%	Field goal percentage
3P%	3-point field goal percentage	FT%	Free throw percentage	RPG	Rebounds per game
APG	Assists per game	SPG	Steals per game	BPG	Blocks per game
PPG	Points per game	**Bold**	Career high		Led the league

Note: Only games in the primary domestic competitions are included. Therefore, games in cup or European competitions are left out.

=== Domestic Leagues ===
Year	Team	League	GP	MPG	FG%	3P%	FT%	RPG	APG	SPG	BPG	PPG
2014–15	(Lithuania) Dzūkija	LKL	15	21.4	.401	.411	.850	**3.7**	3.4	.8	.0	10.8
2014–15	(Lithuania) Pieno žvaigždės	LKL	24	21.9	.502	.368	.791	3.0	3.6	1.2	.1	**15.5**
2014–15	(Lithuania) Pieno žvaigždės	BBL	7	20.8	.463	.308	.857	3.5	3.8	1.5	.1	13.4
2015–16	(Czech Republic) Nymburk	NBL	20	22.3	**.516**	**.430**	.818	2.8	**4.6**	1.4	**.2**	14.6
2015–16	(Czech Republic) Nymburk	VTB	31	23.2	.454	.398	.881	2.7	**4.6**	1.3	.1	14.3
2016–17	(Greece) A.E.K.	GBL	**32**	23.1	.417	.299	.750	2.5	2.9	.8	.0	11.5
2017	(France) Strasbourg	Pro A	11	23.9	.426	.292	.811	2.0	4.3	1.1	.0	13.4
2017–18	(Turkey) Bahçeşehir	TBL	28	**27.5**	.461	.385	.833	2.0	3.8	.9	.1	14.1
2018–19	(Israel) Bnei Herzliya	IPL	17	24.7	.411	.410	**.903**	2.1	4.2	**1.7**	.0	12.0

=== European Competitions ===
Year	Team	League	GP	MPG	FG%	3P%	FT%	RPG	APG	SPG	BPG	PPG
2015–16	(Czech Republic) Nymburk	Europe Cup	11	25.8	.516	.352	.846	**4.5**	**4.8**	**1.6**	**.2**	**16.7**
2016–17	(Greece) A.E.K.	BCL	**18**	**26.2**	.503	.449	.800	2.5	2.6	1.2	.1	14.7
2017–18	(France) Strasbourg	BCL	6	20.3	**.646**	**.471**	**1.000**	2.5	4.3	1.0	**.2**	13.0

Source: RealGM

== Personal life ==
Dixon is the son of Mike Dixon Sr. and Sybil Dixon, and he has one sister, Alexis, and one brother, Jarred, who plays college basketball for the Missouri State Bears. He graduated from the University of Memphis in May 2014, with a bachelor's degree in interdisciplinary studies. On December 2, 2016, Dixon was involved in a fatal car accident in Menidi, Athens, Greece, that caused the death of a 64-year-old male sanitation worker. Dixon was released from custody, after giving his testimony about the incident.

He has a son named Michael with Greek singer Sophia Kotsopoulou. The couple was expecting their second child in April 2021.
