= 2020 Egyptian Basketball Super League Finals =

| Team | Coach | Wins |
|---|---|---|
| Al Ittihad | Ahmed Marie | 3 |
| Al Ahly | Ashraf Tawfiq | 1 |
- Dates: 4–10 September 2020
- MVP: Ismail Ahmad (Al Ittihad)

2020 Egyptian Basketball Super League Finals It is a final between the two Egyptian basketball Teams Al Ittihad and Al Ahly. Before this final, Al Ittihad won 12 league titles and Al Ahly won 5, Egyptian League. The final is played in a best of five, for the Second time in a row. Al Ittihad won 2019-20 and crowned the 13 title of Egyptian Basketball Super League The season resumed 16 August 2020.

Al Ittihad won its 13th title.
