= Michael Thompson (basketball) =

American basketball player

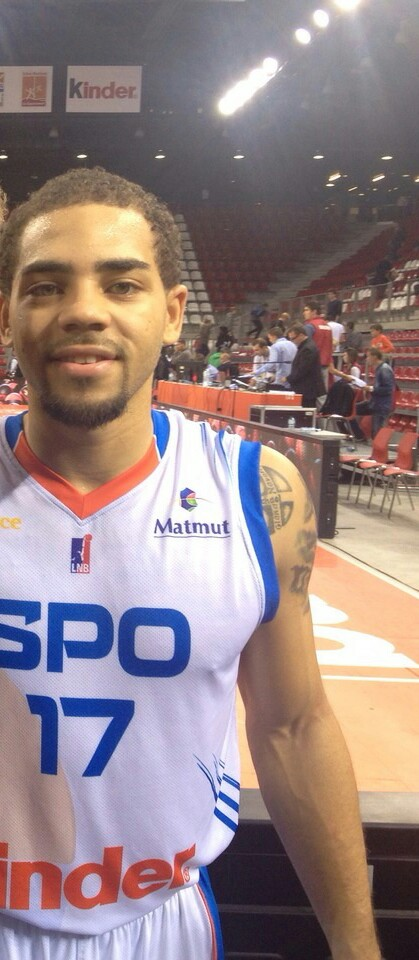
- Thompson with Rouen in 2015

No. 2 – Al Ahly
- Position: Point guard
- League: Egyptian Basketball Super League

Personal information
- Born: February 9, 1989 (age 37) Chicago, Illinois, U.S.
- Listed height: 5 ft 10 in (1.78 m)
- Listed weight: 183 lb (83 kg)

Career information
- High school: Lincoln Park (Chicago, Illinois)
- College: Northwestern (2007–2011)
- NBA draft: 2011: undrafted
- Playing career: 2011–present

Career history
- 2011–2012: Skyliners Frankfurt
- 2012–2013: ASVEL
- 2013–2014: Élan Béarnais Pau-Orthez
- 2014–2015: SPO Rouen
- 2015–2016: Élan Béarnais Pau-Orthez
- 2016–2017: Beşiktaş
- 2017–2018: İstanbul BB
- 2018–2019: Le Mans
- 2019–2020: BCM Gravelines-Dunkerque
- 2020–2021: Astana
- 2021–2022; 2023–present: Al Ahly

Career highlights
- BAL champion (2023); Egyptian League champion (2022); Egyptian Cup winner (2022); Arab Club Championship winner (2021); French League scoring champion (2016); French League Best Five (2016)
- Stats at Basketball Reference

Michael Jovan "Juice" Thompson (born February 9, 1989) is an American professional basketball player who plays for Al Ahly of the Basketball Africa League (BAL) and the Egyptian Basketball Premier League. In the 2023 season, he won the BAL championship with Al Ahly.

== Professional career ==
In June 2013, Thompson signed with Élan Béarnais Pau-Lacq-Orthez.

On July 24, 2014, he joined SPO Rouen.

On August 12, 2015, Thompson returned to Élan béarnais Pau-Lacq-Orthez. On 31 October 2015, Thompson scored 41 points in a game against SLUC Nancy. Thompson was named to the All-LNB Pro A Team of the 2015–16 season and was the league's top scorer.

On July 4, 2016, Thompson signed with Turkish club Beşiktaş.

On July 9, 2017, Thompson joined İstanbul BB.

On August 23, 2019, he has signed with BCM Gravelines-Dunkerque of the LNB Pro A. He averaged 9.9 points, 2.8 rebounds, and 5.7 assists per game. On August 10, 2020, Thompson signed with BC Astana of the Kazakhstan Championship and the VTB United League.

On September 9, 2021, Thompson signed with Egyptian club Al Ahly. After the 2021–22 season, he left the team; however, Thompson returned in April 2023 for the 2023 BAL season. On May 27, 2023, Thompson won the 2023 BAL championship with Al Ahly.
