= Mouhanad El-Sabagh =

Egyptian basketball player

Smouha
- Position: Point guard
- League: Egyptian Basketball Super League

Personal information
- Born: April 23, 1988 (age 36); Alexandria, Egypt
- Listed height: 1.82 m (6 ft 0 in)
- Listed weight: 77 kg (170 lb)

Career information
- Playing career: 2006–present

Career history
- 2006–2016: Al Ittihad Alexandria
- 2016–2017: Al Ahly
- 2020: Smouha
- 2021–2022: Ashab Aljead
- 2022–present: Smouha

Career highlights and awards
- FIBA ACC champion (2016); 3× Egyptian League champion (2009, 2010, 2016); Egyptian Cup winner (2010)

Mouhanad El-Sabagh (born April 23, 1988) is an Egyptian basketball player for Smouha of the Egyptian Basketball Super League. He played for the Egyptian national team, where he participated at the 2014 FIBA Basketball World Cup.

== Awards and accomplishments ==
=== Club ===
Al Ahly

- FIBA Africa Clubs Champions Cup: (2016)
- Egyptian Super League: (2016)

Al Ittihad Alexandria

- 2× Egyptian Super League: (2009, 2010)
- Egyptian Cup: (2010)
