= 2023–24 Egyptian Basketball Premier League =

Egyptian Basketball Premier League
- Season: 2023–24
- Dates: 8 January 2024 – 13 June 2024
- Teams: 16

Regular season
- Season MVP: Ahmed Adel (Al Ittihad)
- Relegated: Eastern Company; Olympic

Finals
- Champions: Al Ittihad Alexandria (14th title)
- Runners-up: Al Ahly

The 2023–24 Egyptian Basketball Premier League is the 49th season of the Premier League, the top level of professional basketball in Egypt. The preliminary round began on 8 January 2024, and the season ended with the final game of the finals on 13 June 2024.

Al Ahly were the defending champions. Al Ittihad Alexandria won their 14th title, ending a three-year drought, after beating Al Ahly in the finals.

== Teams ==
▲ Promoted from 2022 to 2023 Second Division	▼ Relegated from 2022–23 Egyptian Basketball Premier League
El Shams; Al Zohor	Desouk; Horse Owners' Club

== Preliminary round ==
The teams were matched based on their rankings in the 2022–23 Egyptian Basketball Premier League, with the 1st ranked team playing the 16th ranked team, and so forth.

The winners of the preliminary round were placed in the Super League, while the losing teams played in the bottom group.

The team denoted as "Team 1" played the first leg at home. The first leg was played on 8 or 9 January, the second leg on 11 January and the third leg (if necessary) on 14 January 2024.

Team 1	Series	Team 2	Game 1	Game 2	Game 3
Al Ahly	2–0	Aviation Club	86–57	88–57	–
Smouha	2–1	Al Zohor	79–64	62–66	56–66
Al Ittihad Alexandria	2–0	El Shams	76–40	80–60	–
Gezira	2–0	Eastern Company	95–59	41–59	–
Telecom Egypt	2–0	El Gaish Army	78–74	63-37	–
Sporting Alexandria	2–0	Egypt Insurance	76–40	80–60	–
Olympic	0–2	Heliopolis	83–89	53–63	–
Zamalek	2–0	Suez Canal SC	72–54	75–55	–

== Super League ==
Pos	Team	Pld	W	L	PF	PA	PD	Pts	Qualification or relegation
1	Al Ittihad Alexandria	14	13	1	1175	996	+179	27	Qualification to quarterfinals
2	Al Ahly	14	11	3	1192	1073	+119	25	Qualification to quarterfinals
3	Zamalek	14	10	4	1087	967	+120	24	Qualification to quarterfinals
4	Gezira	14	8	6	1098	1042	+56	22	Qualification to quarterfinals
5	Sporting Alexandria	14	7	7	1070	1061	+9	21	Qualification to quarterfinals
6	Smouha	14	4	10	938	1035	−97	18	Qualification to quarterfinals
7	Egypt Telecom	14	2	12	938	1122	−184	16	Qualification to 7th-10th placement round
8	Heliopolis	14	1	13	890	1092	−202	15	Qualification to 7th-10th placement round

Source: Goalzz

== 9th-16th place round ==
Pos	Team	Pld	W	L	PF	PA	PD	Pts	
1	Suez Canal	14	13	1	1024	911	+113	27	Qualification to 7th-10th placement round
2	Army	14	12	2	1021	890	+131	26	Qualification to 7th-10th placement round
3	El Shams	14	8	6	1031	1000	+31	22	Qualification to classification round
4	Egypt Insurance	14	6	8	874	910	−36	20	Qualification to classification round
5	Al Zohor	14	5	9	989	1022	−33	19	Qualification to classification round
6	Aviation Club	14	5	9	944	988	−44	19	Qualification to classification round
7	Olympic	14	4	10	920	1043	−123	18	Qualification to classification round
8	Eastern Company	14	3	11	912	951	−39	17	Qualification to classification round

Source: Goalzz

== Playoffs ==
The playoffs began with the play-in round to decide the 7th and 8th seeds in the playoffs. The game were played on 25, 26 and 28 March 2024.

Placement 7th-10th
8	Heliopolis	61	47	68	1
9	Suez Canal	69	42	74	2
7	Telecom Egypt	62	64	83	2
10	Army	82	63	75	1

Quarterfinals
1	Al Ittihad Alexandria	85	84	99	3
8	Suez Canal	62	66	64	0
4	Gezira	67	76	89	85	61	2
5	Sporting Alexandria	77	68	78	87	73	3
2	Al Ahly	83	89	83	3
7	Telecom Egypt	70	69	57	0
3	Zamalek	77	68	87	3
6	Smouha	60	65	56	0

Semifinals
1	Al Ittihad Alexandria	89	68	88	3
5	Sporting Alexandria	75	63	78	0
2	Al Ahly	79	76	83	3
3	Zamalek	60	71	80	0

Finals
1	Al Ittihad Alexandria	71	79	80	76	3
2	Al Ahly	69	83	78	70	1

== Classification round ==
The losers of the play-in round and the 11th to 16th ranked teams played in this round to determine which teams would play in the relegation round. The series are played in a best-of-five format. Team 1 played games one, two and five at home.

Team 1	Agg.	Team 2	1st leg	2nd leg	3rd leg	4th leg
Egypt Insurance	3–2	Al Zohor	59–67	63–49	69–72	64–62
Heliopolis	3–0	Eastern	56–51	55–50	68–62	–
Army	3–1	Olympic	67–60	78–63	63–74	79–73
Al Shams	3–0	Aviation Club	75–71	75–71	87–82	–

== Relegation round ==
Pos	Team	Pld	W	L	PF	PA	PD	Pts	
1	Al Zohor	6	5	1	449	386	+63	11	
2	Aviation Club	6	4	2	378	388	−10	10	
3	Eastern Company (R)	6	2	4	374	367	+7	8	Relegated to Premier League B
4	Olympic (R)	6	1	5	376	436	−60	7	Relegated to Premier League B

Source: Goalzz
(R) Relegated
