= Haytham Kamal (basketball) =

Egyptian basketball player (born 1987)

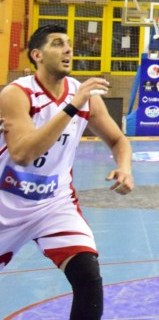
- Kamal with Egypt in 2017

No. 6 – Al Ittihad Alexandria
- Position: Center
- League: Egyptian Basketball Super League

Personal information
- Born: 17 November 1987 (age 38) Alexandria, Egypt
- Listed height: 2.08 m (6 ft 10 in)
- Listed weight: 105 kg (231 lb)

Career information
- NBA draft: 2009: undrafted

Career history
- Sporting Alexandria
- 2013–present: Al Ittihad

Career highlights
- Egyptian League champion (2024); Egyptian League scoring champion (2021); Egypt Cup winner (2024)

Haytham Kamal Khalifa (born 17 November 1987) is an Egyptian basketball player for Al Ittihad and the Egyptian national team, where he participated at the 2014 FIBA Basketball World Cup.

Haytham won the Egypt Cup in 2024 with Al Ittihad.
