= Al Ahly (basketball) =

Egyptian basketball club in Cairo

- 2025–26 Al Ahly men's basketball season
- Nickname: Red Devils; Reds; Matadors
- Leagues: Egyptian Basketball Premier League
- Founded: 1930; 96 years ago
- Arena: Al Ahly Sports Hall
- Capacity: 2,500
- Location: Cairo, Egypt
- Team colors: Red, White and Gold
- Main sponsor: Telecom Egypt
- CEO: Mohammed Morgan
- President: Mahmoud El Khatib
- General manager: Khaled Al-Awadi
- Team manager: Ahmed El Garhy
- Head coach: Linos Gavriel
- Team captain: Seif Samir
- Ownership: Al Ahly SC
- Championships: 9 Egyptian Super League; 11 Egypt Cup; 2 Egyptian Super Cup; 11 Egyptian Mortabat League; 1 Basketball Africa League; 1 FIBA Africa Clubs Champions Cup; 2 African Basketball Cup Winners' Cup; 1 Arab Club Basketball Championship
- Website: Link
| Home | Away |

Al Ahly is an Egyptian basketball club of Al Ahly SC, located in Cairo, Cairo Governorate, that plays in the Egyptian Basketball Premier League. Currently, two of its athletes play for the Egypt men's national basketball team. The team is a part of the multi-sports club of the same name.

The club has won nine Egyptian Super League titles and eleven Egyptian Cup titles. Internationally, Al Ahly has won the FIBA Africa Champions Cup in 2016, the BAL in 2023, and the Arabophone Championship in 2021.

== History ==
Ahly Basketball team was founded in 1930. It is one of the oldest basketball clubs in Egypt and in Africa.

The team played his first game against Al Ittihad Alexandria in front of the Egyptian king Farouq in 1937. Al Ahly won its first Egyptian national championship in the 1988–89 season.

In July 2021, Al Ahly signed Spanish coach Augustí Julbe as their new head coach. In the following 2021–22 season, Ahly won its sixth Premier League title and thus qualified for the 2023 season of the Basketball Africa League (BAL).

In the following season, Al Ahly made their debut in the BAL and had a 4–1 record in the Nile Conference, which was hosted in Cairo. In the playoffs, Al Ahly defeated REG and Stade Malien in the quarter- and semi-finals. In the final, Al Ahly defeated the Senegalese champions AS Douanes 80–65, to win their second continental title and first BAL title. Al Ahly forward Nuni Omot was named the league MVP. In the 2022–23 domestic season, Al Ahly won the double once again under Julbe.

In the following season, Al Ahly represented Africa in the 2023 FIBA Intercontinental Cup in Singapore. On 21 September 2023, Al Ahly became the first African club to win a game in the competition's 33-year existence, following a win over the NBA G League Ignite.

== Honours ==
=== National achievements ===
- Egyptian Basketball Super League :
  Winners (9) : 1988–89, 1999–00, 2000–01, 2011–12, 2015–16, 2021–22, 2022–23, 2024–25, 2025–26
- Egypt Basketball Cup :
  Winners (11) : 1987–88, 1992–93, 1994–95, 1998–99, 2003–04, 2006–07, 2008–09, 2010–11, 2017–18, 2021–22, 2022–23
- Egyptian Mortabat League :
  Winners (11) (record) : 2005–06, 2006–07, 2016–17, 2017–18, 2018–19, 2020–21, 2021–22, 2022–23, 2023–24, 2024–25, 2025–26
- Egyptian Super Cup :
  Winners (2) : 2023, 2025

=== International achievements ===
- Basketball Africa League :
  - Champions (1) (shared record) : 2023
- FIBA Africa Clubs Champions Cup :
  - Champions (1) : 2016
  - Third place : 2004, 2012
- African Basketball Cup Winners' Cup :
  - Champions (2) (record) : 1998, 2000

=== Regional Achievements ===
- Arab Club Basketball Championship :
  - Champions (1) : 2021
  - Runners-up : 1991, 1999, 2000, 2022
  - Third place : 1995, 2001

== Season by season ==
| Season | Tier | League | Regular season | | | | | Playoffs | Egyptian Cup | International competitions | | Head coach |
| Season | Tier | League | Finish | Played | Wins | Losses | Win% | Playoffs | Egyptian Cup | League | Result | Head coach |
|---|---|---|---|---|---|---|---|---|---|---|---|---|
Al Ahly
| 2016–17 | 1 | Super League | 4th | 14 | 6 | 8 | .429 | N/A | Runner-up | DNQ | | |
| 2017–18 | 1 | Super League | 7th | 12 | 7 | 5 | .583 | Won quarterfinals (Smouha) 2–0 Won semifinals (Sporting) 2–0 Won finals (Gezira) 2–0 | Winner | DNQ | | |
| 2018–19 | 1 | Super League | 2nd | 14 | 10 | 4 | .714 | Won quarterfinals (Smouha) 2–1; Lost semifinals (Zamalek) 1–3 | Runner-up | ABL | Quarterfinalist | |
| 2019–20 | 1 | Super League | 2nd | 14 | 11 | 3 | .786 | Won quarterfinals (Insurance) 3–0; Won semifinals (Gezira) 3–1; Lost finals (Ittihad) 1–3 | Runner-up | N/A | | |
| 2020–21 | 1 | Super League | 4th | 14 | 8 | 6 | .571 | Won quarterfinals (Sporting) 3–0; Lost semifinals (Ittihad) 0–3 | Runner-up | DNQ | | Mário Palma |
| 2021–22 | 1 | Super League | 2nd | 14 | 11 | 3 | .786 | Won quarterfinals (Insurance) 3–0; Won semifinals (Gezira) 3–0; Won finals (Ittihad) 3–2 | Winners | DNQ | | Augustí Julbe |
| 2022–23 | 1 | Super League | 2nd | 14 | 13 | 1 | .929 | Won quarterfinals (Telecom) 3–0; Won semifinals (Zamalek) 3–0; Won finals (Ittihad) 3–1 | Winners | BAL | Champions | Augustí Julbe |
| 2023–24 | 1 | Super League | 2nd | 14 | 11 | 3 | .786 | Won quarterfinals (Telecom) 3–0; Won semifinals (Zamalek) 3–0; Lost finals (Ittihad) 1–3 | Runner-up | BAL | Quarterfinalist | Augustí Julbe |
| 2024–25 | 1 | Super League | 1st | 5 | 5 | 0 | 1.000 | Won quarterfinals (Heliopolis) 3–0; Won semifinals (Zamalek) 3–2; Won finals (Ittihad) 3–2 | Runner-up | DNQ | | Augustí Julbe |
| 2025–26 | 1 | Super League | 2nd | 15 | 12 | 3 | .800 | Won quarterfinals (Sporting) 2–1; Won semifinals (Telecom) 3–1 finals (Ittihad) TBD | | BAL | Group phase | Linos Gavriel |

== 2016 FIBA Africa victory & 2023 BAL champions ==
The 2016 FIBA Africa Basketball Club Championship (31st edition), was an international basketball tournament held in Cairo, Egypt from 7 to 16 December 2016. The tournament, organized by FIBA Africa and hosted by Al Ahly, was contested by 10 clubs split into 2 groups of five, the top four of each group qualifying for the knock-out stage, quarter, semi-finals, and final. Al Ahly won the trophy as the first Egyptian basketball team to win it in the new format. At this time, no Egyptian basketball team has reached the final match. By winning this trophy Al Ahly (basketball) became the most titled Egyptian Basketball team 3 titles 1 FIBA Africa Clubs Champions Cup + 2 African Basketball Cup Winners' Cup.

| Round | Team | Result | Video |
|---|---|---|---|
| Group Stage | (Cameroon) Nzui Manto | 82–53 | Full match |
| Group Stage | (Tunisia) Club Africain | 79–74 OT | Full match + Highlights |
| Group Stage | (Angola) 1º de Agosto | 68–64 | Full match + Highlights |
| Group Stage | (Nigeria) Kano Pillars | 92–76 | Full match + Highlights |
| Quarter finals | (Cameroon) BEAC Yaoundi | 63-60 | Full match |
| Semifinal | (Nigeria) Kano Pillars | 71–65 | Full match + Highlights |
| Final | (Angola) Rec do Libolo | 68-66 | Full match + Highlights |

Roster for the 2023 BAL season

Roster for the 2023 BAL season, which saw the team crowned champions.
(Ages in parentheses show players' age during the Finals)

Al Ahly roster
Players
Coaches

| Pos. | No. | Nat. | Name | Ht. | Wt. | Age |
|---|---|---|---|---|---|---|
| PG | 2 | (United States) | Thompson, Michael (I) (age 34) | 1.78 m (5 ft 10 in) | 83 kg (183 lb) | 37 – 19 February 1989 |
| PF | 4 | (Egypt) | Sarhan, Marwan (age 31) | 2.03 m (6 ft 8 in) | 100 kg (220 lb) | 34 – 2 May 1992 |
| SF | 5 | (Egypt) | Gendy, Amr (age 31) | 1.92 m (6 ft 4 in) | 87 kg (192 lb) | 35 – 14 June 1991 |
| PF | 7 | (South Sudan) | Omot, Nuni (I) (age 28) | 2.06 m (6 ft 9 in) | 95 kg (209 lb) | 32 – 3 October 1994 |
| G | 10 | (Mali) | Camara, Dramane (DP) (age 19) | 1.95 m (6 ft 5 in) | 86 kg (190 lb) | 22 – 24 January 2004 |
| SG | 13 | (Egypt) | Abouzeid, Moamen (age 20) | 1.85 m (6 ft 1 in) | 81 kg (179 lb) | 23 – 1 January 2003 |
| G/F | 14 | (Egypt) | Zahran, Amr (age 21) | 1.91 m (6 ft 3 in) | 81 kg (179 lb) | 25 – 6 October 2001 |
| SG | 15 | (New Zealand) | Webster, Corey (I) (age 34) | 1.88 m (6 ft 2 in) | 89 kg (196 lb) | 37 – 29 November 1988 |
| SF | 23 | (Egypt) | Abdelkawy, Mohamed (age 31) | 1.90 m (6 ft 3 in) | 85 kg (187 lb) | 35 – 15 August 1991 |
| F/C | 24 | (Egypt) | Samir, Seif (C) (age 29) | 2.03 m (6 ft 8 in) | 95 kg (209 lb) | 33 – 5 June 1993 |
| C | 34 | (Egypt) | Ismail, Ahmed (age 28) | 2.10 m (6 ft 11 in) | 118 kg (260 lb) | 31 – 21 January 1995 |
| C | 41 | (Egypt) | Oraby, Omar (age 31) | 2.18 m (7 ft 2 in) | 122 kg (269 lb) | 35 – 8 September 1991 |
| G | 45 | (Egypt) | Amin, Ehab (age 27) | 1.93 m (6 ft 4 in) | 91 kg (201 lb) | 31 – 1 August 1995 |

Head coach

- (Spain) Augustí Julbe

Legend

- (C) Team captain
- (DP) Development player
- (I) Import player
- Injured

- Roster
Updated: 27 May 2023

== Current roster ==
Al Ahly roster
Players
Coaches

| Pos. | No. | Nat. | Name | Ht. | Wt. | Age |
|---|---|---|---|---|---|---|
| G/F | 0 | (Egypt) | Zahran, Amr | 1.91 m (6 ft 3 in) | 82 kg (181 lb) | 25 – 6 October 2001 |
| PG | 2 | (United States) | Thompson, Michael (I) | 1.78 m (5 ft 10 in) | 83 kg (183 lb) | 37 – 9 February 1989 |
| G | 4 | (Egypt) | Amin, Ehab | 1.93 m (6 ft 4 in) | 91 kg (201 lb) | 31 – 1 August 1995 |
| PF | 6 | (Egypt) | Sarhan, Marwan | 2.03 m (6 ft 8 in) | 102 kg (225 lb) | 34 – 2 May 1992 |
| PG | 10 | (Mali) | Camara, Dramane (DP) | 1.96 m (6 ft 5 in) | 92 kg (203 lb) | 22 – 24 January 2004 |
| SG | 13 | (Egypt) | Abouzeid, Moamen | 1.85 m (6 ft 1 in) | 81 kg (179 lb) | 23 – 1 January 2003 |
| PF | 15 | (South Sudan) | Omot, Nuni (I) | 2.06 m (6 ft 9 in) | 98 kg (216 lb) | 32 – 3 October 1994 |
| SF | 22 | (Egypt) | Gendy, Amr | 1.92 m (6 ft 4 in) | 87 kg (192 lb) | 35 – 14 June 1991 |
| SF | 23 | (Egypt) | Abdelkawy, Mohamed | 1.90 m (6 ft 3 in) | 85 kg (187 lb) | 35 – 15 August 1991 |
| F/C | 24 | (Egypt) | Samir, Seif (C) | 2.03 m (6 ft 8 in) | 95 kg (209 lb) | 33 – 5 June 1993 |
| C | 34 | (Egypt) | Ismail, Ahmed | 2.08 m (6 ft 10 in) | 118 kg (260 lb) | 31 – 21 January 1995 |
| C | 41 | (Egypt) | Oraby, Omar | 2.18 m (7 ft 2 in) | 122 kg (269 lb) | 35 – 8 September 1991 |

Head coach

- (Greece) Linos Gavriel

Legend

- (C) Team captain
- (DP) Development player
- (I) Import player
- Injured

- Roster
Updated: 1 March 2026

== Depth chart ==
| Pos. | Starting 5 | Bench 1 | Bench 2 |
|---|---|---|---|
| C | Omar Tarek | Ahmed Ismail | Abdullah Nasser |
| PF | Marwan Sarhan | Seif Samir |
| SF | Amr Gendy | Amr Zahran | Mohamed Abouelnasser |
| SG | Ehab Amin | Ahmed Mohieb | Moamen Khairy |
| PG | Walter Hodge | Omar Azab | Karim Hatem |

== Transfers ==
Transfers for the 2023–24 season

Joining

Leaving

- (Egypt) Ahmed Ismail to (Egypt) Zamalek SC

Transfers for the 2022–23 season

Joining

- (Puerto Rico) Walter Hodge from (Puerto Rico) Capitanes de Arecibo

Leaving

Transfers for the 2021–22 season

Joining

- (United States) Michael THOMPSON from (Kazakhstan) BC Astana
- (Egypt) Omar Azab from (Egypt) Smouha SC
- (Egypt) Marwan Sarhan from (Egypt) Smouha SC

Leaving

- (Egypt) Ahmed Elsalwai to ??
- (Egypt) Mohamed Mostafa to (Egypt) Misr Insurance
- (Egypt) Abdelfadeel Ibrahim to (Egypt) Smouha SC
- (Egypt) Hatem Elbehrey to (Egypt) El Ittihad Alexandria (basketball)
- (United States) Alex Young to (United Arab Emirates) Sharjah FC

Transfers for the 2019–20 season

Joining

- (Egypt) Amr Gendy from (Egypt) Gezira (basketball club)
- (Egypt) Omar Orabi from (Egypt) Gezira (basketball club)
- (Egypt) Ahmed Moheib from (Egypt) Sporting
- (Egypt) Ahmed Hamdy from (Georgia (country)) BC Rustavi
- (Egypt) Mostafa Moudy from (Egypt) Misr Insurance

Leaving

- (Egypt) Ramy Gunady to (Saudi Arabia) Al Wehda Club (Mecca)
- (Egypt) Ahmed Ismael to (Egypt) Gezira (basketball club)
- (Egypt) Ayman Shawqat to (Egypt) Gezira (basketball club)
- (Egypt) Mahmoud Elshershaby to (Egypt) Misr Insurance
- (Egypt) Mahmoud Elzayat to (Egypt) Misr Insurance
- (Egypt) Mohammed Adly to (Egypt) Tala'ea El Gaish SC

Joining

- (Egypt) Ehab Amin from Oregon Ducks men's basketball
- (Egypt) Ayman Shawqat from Tala'ea El Gaish SC
- (Egypt) Abdelfadeel Ibrahim from Tala'ea El Gaish SC
- (Egypt) Mahmoud Elshershaby from El Sharqya Lldokhan Club
- (Egypt) Mahmoud Elzayat from Smouha SC
- (Egypt) Ahmed Ismail from IUPUI Jaguars men's basketball
- (United States) Alex Young from BC Enisey

Leaving

- (Egypt) Tarek ElGhanam Retire
- (Egypt) Mostafa ElShafeey to Misr Insurance
- (Egypt) Ahmed Fahmi to Smouha SC
- (Egypt) Moamen Abouelanin to Smouha SC
- (Egypt) Mostafa Meshaal to Zamalek SC
- (Egypt) Karim ElDahshan to Zamalek SC

Transfers for the 2018–19 season

Joining

- (Egypt) Hatem El Bahiary from (El Ittihad Alexandria (basketball))
- (Egypt) Ahmed Fahmi from (El Ittihad Alexandria (basketball))
- Mostafa Meshaal from (Egypt insurance)
- (Egypt) Ramy Genedy from (Gezira (basketball club))
- (United States) Quinton Doggett from (Vietnam) Hochiminh City Wings
- (United States) (Armenia) Todd O'brien from (Libya) Al Ahli SC (Tripoli)

Leaving

- (Egypt) Ahmed Gamal to Zamalek SC
- (Egypt) Mohamed Elkossey to Smouha SC
- (Egypt) Fathey Zaki to Smouha SC
- (Egypt) Mohaned El Sabagh to El Gezira SC

Transfers for the 2017–18 season

Joining

- (Egypt) Mohamed Adly El Ittihad Alexandria (basketball)

Leaving

- (Egypt) Sherief Eldiastey

Transfers for the 2016–17 season

Joining

- (Egypt) Moamen Abouelanin El Ittihad Alexandria (basketball)
- (Egypt) Mouhanad El-Sabagh El Ittihad Alexandria (basketball)
- (Egypt) Tarek ElGhanam Gezira (basketball club)

Leaving

- (Egypt) Ahmed Emara
- (Egypt) Ibrahim Abu Khadra
- (Egypt) Mostafa Shawaat
- (Egypt) Karim Shamsya

== Technical and managerial staff ==
| Name | Role | Nationality |
|---|---|---|
| Linos Gavriel | Head coach | & Cypriot / Greek |
| Ahmed El Garhy | Assistant coach | Egyptian |
| Rami Eldaisty | Assistant coach | Egyptian |
| Walid Elkhratt | Manager | Egyptian |
| Tarek Elgannam | Team Manager | Egyptian |
| Mohamed Gad | physician | Egyptian |
| Haitham Atef | Physiotherapist | Egyptian |
| Nader Kozam | nutrition specialist | Egyptian |
| Mohamed Essa | Masseur | Egyptian |
| Alaa Lotfy | scouting | Egyptian |

== Kit manufacturers and shirt sponsors ==
| Period | Kit supplier | Shirt sponsors |
|---|---|---|
| 2006–2009 | (Germany) Puma | (United Kingdom) Vodafone / (Egypt) Juhayna / (United States) Chevrolet / (United States) Coca-Cola |
| 2009–2011 | (Germany) Adidas | (United Kingdom) Vodafone / (Egypt) Juhayna / (United States) Chevrolet / (United States) Coca-Cola |
| 2011–2015 | (Germany) Adidas | (United Arab Emirates) Etisalat / (Egypt) Juhayna / (United States) Chevrolet |
| 2015–2017 | (Italy) Diadora | (United Kingdom) Vodafone / (Egypt) Juhayna / (China) Huawei / (Egypt) Egyptian Steel / (United Kingdom) Shell Helix / (United States) Domino's |
| 2017–2018 | (Germany) Hummel | (United Kingdom) Vodafone / (Egypt) Juhayna / (China) Huawei / (Egypt) Egyptian Steel / (United Kingdom) Shell Helix / (United States) Domino's |
| 2018–2019 | (Germany) Hummel | (Egypt) TORNADO / (India) LAVA / (United Kingdom) Vodafone |
| 2019–2022 | (Spain) Kelme | (Egypt) WE / (Egypt) TIGER / (Egypt) GLC Paints / (United Kingdom) Shell Helix |

== Home arena ==
As Al Ahly started to create teams for handball, basketball, and volleyball; they saw the importance of building an arena to host home matches for these clubs. The process of developing designs and searching for funds began in 1978, but was ultimately postponed due to funding issues. It wasn't until the 4th of February, 1994, that Al Ahly opened its sports hall.

== Notable players ==
- (Egypt) Marwan Sarhan
- (Egypt) Ehab Amin
- (Egypt) Amr Gendy
- (Egypt) Omar Tarek
- (Tunisia) Amine Rzig
- (United States) Wayne Arnold
- (Egypt) Mohamed Sayed Soliman

== Head coaches ==
The following is a (incomplete) list of Al Ahly's head coaches :

- (Portugal) Mário Palma : (2021)
- (Spain) Augustí Julbe : (2021–2025)
- (Cyprus) (Greece) Linos Gavriel : (2025–present)

== Club Presidents ==
| No | Period | Name | From | To |
|---|---|---|---|---|
| 1 | 1st | (England) Alfred Mitchel-Innes | 1907 | 1908 |
| 2 | 1st | (Egypt) Aziz Ezzat Pacha | 1908 | 1916 |
| 3 | 1st | (Egypt) Abdelkhaleq Tharwat Pacha | 1916 | 1924 |
| 4 | 1st | (Egypt) Gaafar Waly Pacha | 1924 | 1940 |
| 5 | 1st | (Egypt) Mohamed Taher Pacha | 1940 | 1941 |
| 6 | 2nd | (Egypt) Gaafar Waly Pacha | 1941 | 1944 |
| 7 | 1st | (Egypt) Ahmed Hasanein Pacha | 1944 | 1946 |
| 8 | 1st | (Egypt) Ahmed Aboud Pacha | 1946 | 1961 |
| 9 | 1st | (Egypt) Salah Desouky Sheshtawy | 1961 | 1965 |
| 10 | 1st | (Egypt) Abdelmohsen Kamel Mortagy | 1965 | 1967 |
| 11 | 1st | (Egypt) Ibrahim El Wakil | 1967 | 1972 |
| 12 | 2nd | (Egypt) Abdelmohsen Kamel Mortagy | 1972 | 1980 |
| 13 | 1st | (Egypt) Saleh Selim | 1980 | 1988 |
| 14 | 1st | (Egypt) Saleh El Wahsh | 1988 | 1992 |
| 15 | 2nd | (Egypt) Saleh Selim | 1992 | 2002 |
| 16 | 1st | (Egypt) Hassan Hamdy | 2002 | 2014 |
| 17 | 1st | (Egypt) Mahmoud Taher | 2014 | 2017 |
| 18 | 1st | (Egypt) Mahmoud El Khatib | 2017 | Present |

== See also ==
- Al Ahly FC
- Al Ahly FC Women
- Al Ahly (volleyball)
- Al Ahly Women's Volleyball
- Al Ahly Women's Basketball
- Al Ahly (handball)
- Al Ahly Women's Handball
- Al Ahly (table tennis)
- Al Ahly (water polo)
- Port Said Stadium riot
- Al-Ahly TV
