= Ehab Amin =

Egyptian basketball player (born 1995)

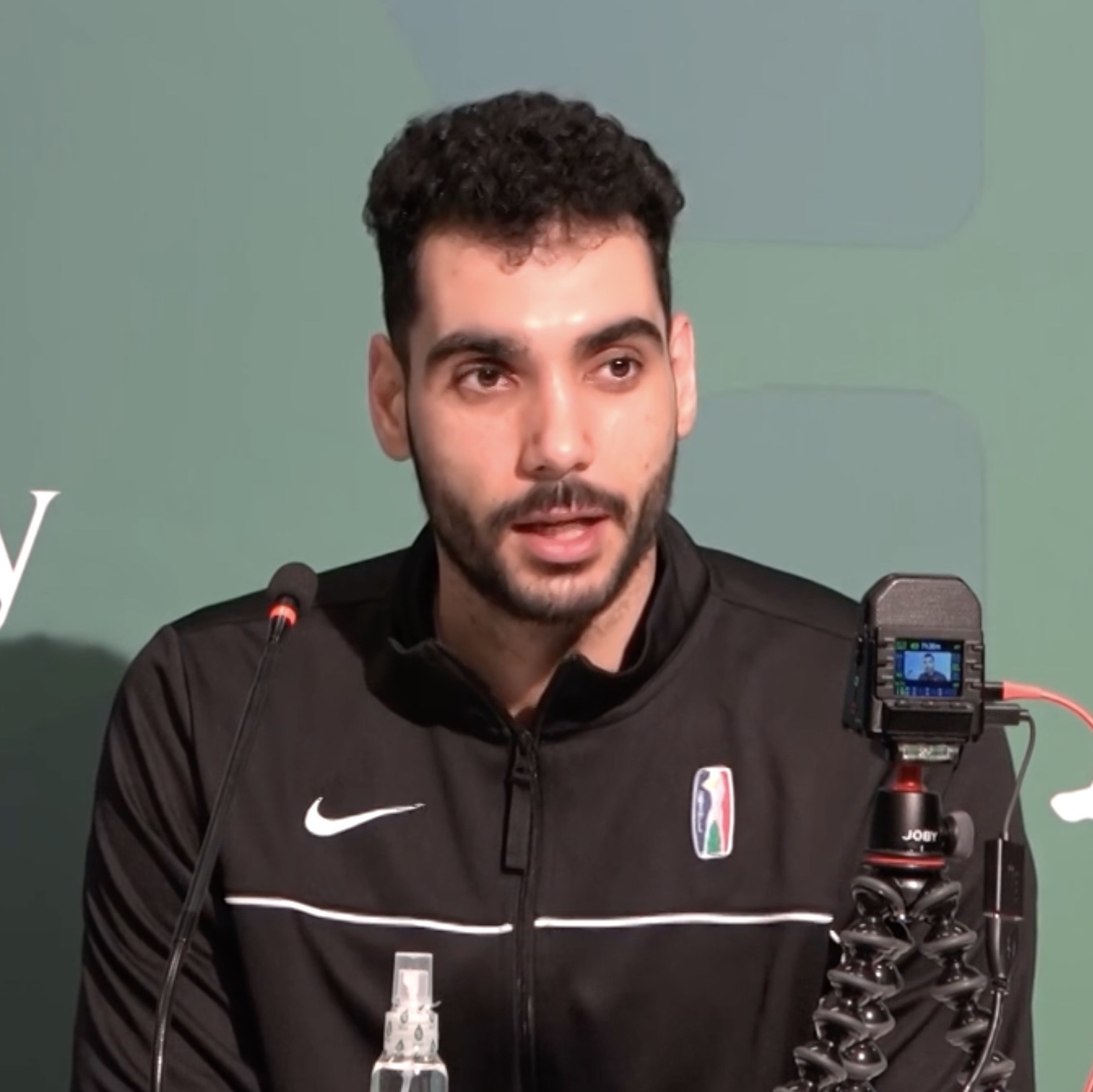
- Amin in 2023

No. 4 – Al Ahly
- Position: Point guard / shooting guard
- League: Egyptian Basketball Super League

Personal information
- Born: August 1, 1995 (age 31) Alexandria, Egypt
- Listed height: 6 ft 4 in (1.93 m)
- Listed weight: 200 lb (91 kg)

Career information
- High school: SJNMA (Delafield, Wisconsin)
- College: Texas A&M–CC (2014–2017); Oregon (2018–2019)
- NBA draft: 2019: undrafted
- Playing career: 2012–present

Career history
- 2012–2013: Sporting Alexandria
- 2019–present: Al Ahly

Career highlights
- FIBA World Cup steals leader (2023); BAL champion (2023); All-BAL Second Team (2024); 4× Egyptian League champion (2013, 2022, 2023, 2025); 3× Egyptian League MVP (2022, 2023, 2025); 3× Egypt Cup winner (2013, 2022, 2023); Egypt Cup MVP (2022); Arab Club Championship winner (2021); Arab Club Championship MVP (2021); NCAA steals leader (2017); First-team All-Southland (2017); Southland All-Defensive Team (2017); FIBA Africa Under-18 Championship MVP (2012); FIBA Africa Under-16 Championship MVP (2011)
Medals
Men's basketball
Representing Egypt
FIBA Africa U18 Championship
Bronze medal – third place	2012 Mozambique
FIBA Africa U16 Championship
Gold medal – first place	2011 Egypt

Ehab Mohamed Mohamed Amin Saleh (born August 1, 1995) is an Egyptian professional basketball player for Al Ahly. He played college basketball for the Oregon Ducks. He spent his first three college seasons at Texas A&M–Corpus Christi, leading the NCAA Division I in steals and earning first-team All-Southland Conference accolades as a junior.

Amin has played for the Egypt national basketball team at both the youth and senior levels, including the under-16 team to a gold medal at the 2011 FIBA Africa Under-16 Championship. Amin received national attention in the United States when he flopped in a Sweet Sixteen game, leading a CBS reporter to call Amin "the worst of 2019 NCAA tournament."

He began his professional career with Al Ahly in Egypt as the best paid player in national basketball history. With Al Ahly, he won the BAL championship in 2023, three Egyptian Premier League titles and one Arab Club Competitions title. He was among Al Ahly squad that participated in FIBA InterContinental Cup 2023 in Singapore.

== Early life and career ==
Amin was born in Alexandria, Egypt to Mohamed and Magda Amin. He has two brothers, named Hesham and Sherif. In his childhood, Amin played soccer, basketball, and swimming. Despite the popularity of soccer in his home country, he was primarily drawn to basketball, which he started at age 6, due to its faster pace. He played for Alexandria Sporting Club for 11 years, joining the senior team at age 18. He helped Sporting win the Egyptian Basketball Super League and Egypt Basketball Cup titles in the 2012–13 season. In addition, he attended Riada American School in Alexandria.

Before the 2013–14 school year, Amin moved to the United States to attend St. John's Northwestern Military Academy, a private school in Delafield, Wisconsin but was sidelined for the entire season after breaking his back. Despite the injury, he was offered a scholarship to play college basketball for Texas A&M–Corpus Christi under head coach Willis Wilson. He eventually committed to the team and enrolled at the school on June 1, 2014.

== College career ==
In his freshman season for Texas A&M–Corpus Christi, Amin averaged 5.2 points, 2.4 rebounds, and 1.1 steals in 15 minutes per game. On February 15, 2015, in a victory over Stephen F. Austin, he recorded a season-high 22 points, 7 rebounds, 3 assists, and 3 steals.

As a sophomore, Amin averaged 8.6 points, 3.9 rebounds, 1.5 assists, and 1.8 steals in 18.1 minutes per game. He posted a season-best 26 points, 9 rebounds, and 3 steals in a January 19, 2016 win over Northwestern State.

In his junior season, Amin averaged 16.9 points, 6.6 rebounds, and 2.9 assists, while leading the NCAA Division I with 3.4 steals per game. He had his best performance of the season on February 15, 2017, in an 81–70 win over McNeese State, notching career-highs of 31 points and 15 rebounds. During the game, Amin also broke the school record for steals in a single season. He also recorded a career-best 7 steals on two separate occasions as a junior. At the end of the season, after breaking the Southland Conference record for single-season steals, Amin earned Southland All-Defensive Team, first-team All-Southland, National Association of Basketball Coaches (NABC) all-region, and mid-major All-American honors.

Two weeks before the 2017–18 season, Amin suffered a hip injury that forced him to redshirt the year. On March 28, 2018, he announced his intentions to transfer from Texas A&M–Corpus Christi. After committing to Nevada in early May 2018, Amin chose to de-commit at the start of June. On June 29, he committed to Oregon. In his lone season at Oregon, Amin averaged 5.9 points and 1.5 steals per game.

== Professional career ==
In August 2019, Amin signed a four-year contract with Al Ahly of the Egyptian Basketball Super League. He reportedly became the most expensive player in the history of Egyptian basketball, having an offer worth £E2.7 million. Al Ahly managed to fend off rivals Zamalek who also pursued Amin.

In September 2021, Amin helped Ahly win the 2021 Arab Club Basketball Championship while being named MVP of the tournament in the process. On March 14, he won his second Egyptian Cup and was named MVP of the tournament.

On April 4, 2022, Amin extended his contract with three more seasons. On May 16, 2022, Amin recorded a team-high 35 points and 8 rebounds in Game 5 of the Egyptian Super League finals, guiding his team to a 86–73 win over Al Ittihad. As such, he helped Al Ahly win the 2021–22 Egyptian Basketball Super League title and was named the league's MVP after the game. Amin finished with three MVP awards in three different competitions in the 2021–22 season.

On May 15, 2023, Amin won his third Egyptian Premier League title and his second MVP award. On May 27, 2023, Al Ahly won the 2023 BAL championship after defeating AS Douanes in the final.

On June 5, 2024, Amin was named to the All-BAL Second Team for the first time.

In the 2024–25 season, Amin won his fourth Egyptian Premier League title with Al Ahly; he was named the MVP for a third time in his career as well.

== National team career ==
=== Junior national team ===
Amin played for Egypt at the 2011 FIBA Africa Under-16 Championship, leading his team to a gold medal and claiming most valuable player (MVP) honors. In his national team debut on July 8, 2011, he recorded 32 points, 3 assists, and 5 steals to coast past Mozambique, 108–54. He averaged 18.3 points, 4.3 assists, and 3.7 steals per game. He competed at the 2012 FIBA Under-17 World Championship, averaging 15.7 points, 5.1 rebounds, and 2.4 steals per game. Later in the year, Amin competed for Egypt at the 2012 FIBA Africa Under-18 Championship, guiding his team to a third-place finish while being named tournament MVP.

=== Senior national team ===
Amin debuted for the Egypt senior national team at AfroBasket 2015. He averaged 11 points, 2.7 rebounds, 2 assists, and 2.4 steals per game. Amin also played at Afrobasket 2021. In the 2023 World Cup, Amin averaged a team-leading 19.4 points, as well as 4.8 and 5.6 assists per game. He scored 26 points in a loss to Montenegro.

== Awards and accomplishments ==
=== Club ===
Al Ahly

- BAL championship (2023)
- Egyptian Premier League: (2022, 2023, 2025)
- Egypt Cup: (2022, 2023)
- Arab Club Basketball Championship: (2021)

Sporting Alexandria

- Egyptian Premier League: (2013)
- Egypt Cup: (2013)

=== National team ===
Egypt Under-18

- FIBA Africa Under-18 Championship (gold) Gold Medal: (2012)

Egypt Under-16

- FIBA Africa Under-16 Championship (gold) Gold Medal: (2011)

=== Individual ===
- Egyptian Super League MVP: (2022, 2023, 2025)
- Egypt Cup MVP: (2022)
- Arab Club Basketball Championship MVP: (2021)
- NCAA steals leader (2017)
- First-team All-Southland: (2017)
- Southland All-Defensive Team: (2017)
- FIBA Africa Under-18 Championship MVP: (2012)
- FIBA Africa Under-16 Championship MVP: (2011)

== Career statistics ==
Legend
GP	Games played	GS	Games started	MPG	Minutes per game
FG%	Field goal percentage	3P%	3-point field goal percentage	FT%	Free throw percentage
RPG	Rebounds per game	APG	Assists per game	SPG	Steals per game
BPG	Blocks per game	PPG	Points per game	**Bold**	Career high

*	Led NCAA Division I

=== College ===
Year	Team	GP	GS	MPG	FG%	3P%	FT%	RPG	APG	SPG	BPG	PPG
2014–15	Texas A&M–CC	33	5	15.0	.427	.192	.690	2.4	.8	1.1	.2	5.2
2015–16	Texas A&M–CC	33	0	18.1	**.476**	**.368**	**.716**	3.9	1.5	1.8	.2	8.6
2016–17	Texas A&M–CC	36	**34**	**33.7**	.462	.289	**.716**	**6.6**	**2.9**	**3.4***	**.4**	**16.9**
2018–19	Oregon	**37**	6	17.9	.374	.317	.646	3.1	1.2	1.5	.1	5.9
Career		139	45	21.3	.443	.298	.702	4.0	1.6	2.0	.2	9.2

== Personal ==
Amin's favourite player is Manu Ginóbili.
