= Haytham Kamal =

Haytham Kamal may refer to:

- Haytham Tambal (born 1978), Sudanese football striker
- Haytham Kamal (basketball) (born 1987), Egyptian basketball player
