= Mohamed Adly =

Egyptian basketball player (born 1987)

Mohamed Adly (born 17 June 1987 in Monofeya, Egypt) is an Egyptian basketball player currently playing for Al Ahly of the Egyptian Super League. He is a member of the Egypt national basketball team.

Adly participated with the Egypt national basketball team at the 2009 FIBA Africa Championship after previously playing for the team in the qualifiers for the FIBA Africa Championship 2007. Fanan averaged 10.7 minutes per game off the bench for the 2009 Egypt team that finished a disappointing tenth place; this was Egypt's worst ever finish in 19 appearances at the tournament and had some fans calling for a complete dismantling of the team. Adly grabbed a team-leading seven rebounds in the team's 72–62 victory over Mozambique, one of only two victories for Egypt in the tournament.
