= African Basketball Cup Winners' Cup =

African Basketball Cup Winner's Cup Ashry Cup

African Basketball Cup Winner's Cup
- Sport: Basketball
- Founded: 1998
- Folded: 2000
- Continent: Africa
- Last champion: (Egypt) Al Ahly SC (2nd title)
- Most titles: (Egypt) Al Ahly SC (2 titles)

The FIBA African Basketball Cup Winner's Cup was a competition organized by the FIBA Africa and played by clubs who won cup trophies in their countries. it was played for the first time in Egypt in 1998, but it was cancelled in 2004 due to the intention of FIBA Africa to start a new competition played in knock out format.

== Finals ==
Year	Host	Champion	Score	Runner-up	Third-place	Score	Fourth-place
1998	(Egypt) Cairo	(Egypt) Al Ahly SC	65-55	(Angola) Petro Atlético	(Nigeria) Ebun Comets	-
2000	(Senegal) Dakar	(Egypt) Al Ahly SC	82-68	(Nigeria) Ebun Comets	(Angola) Petro Atlético	-	(Senegal) Jeanne d'Arc
2002	Was not held
2004	Was not held
