= Egyptian Basketball Mortabat League =

Egypt Basketball Cup
- Sport: Basketball
- Founded: 2005
- Country: Egypt
- Most recent champion: Al Ahly (11th title)
- Most titles: Al Ahly (11th title)
- Related competitions: Egyptian Super League

== Winners by club ==
| N | Club | Titles |
|---|---|---|
| 1 | Al Ahly | 11 |
| 2 | Ittihad | 8 |
| 3 | Sporting | 2 |

== List of Winners ==
| Year | Champion |
|---|---|
| 2005–2006 | Al Ahly |
| 2006–2007 | Al Ahly |
| 2007–2008 | Ittihad |
| 2008–2009 | Ittihad |
| 2009–2010 | Ittihad |
| 2010–2011 | Ittihad |
| 2011–2012 | Ittihad |
| 2012–2013 | Sporting |
| 2013–2014 | Sporting |
| 2014–2015 | Ittihad |
| 2015–2016 | Ittihad |
| 2016–2017 | Al Ahly |
| 2017–2018 | Al Ahly |
| 2018–2019 | Al Ahly |
| 2019–2020 | Ittihad |
| 2020–2021 | Al Ahly |
| 2021–2022 | Al Ahly |
| 2022–2023 | Al Ahly |
| 2023–2024 | Al Ahly |
| 2024–2025 | Al Ahly |
| 2025–2026 | Al Ahly |
