= El-Shams Stadium =

Multi-use stadium in Egypt

- Interactive map of El-Shams Stadium
- Location: Heliopolis, Egypt
- Coordinates: 30.115835°N 31.343294°E
- Capacity: 15,000
- Surface: Grass

Construction
- Renovated: 2014

Tenant
- El Shams SC

The El-Shams Stadium (Egyptian Arabic: استاد الشمس, Egyptian Pronunciation: Estad El Shams) is a multi-use stadium with an all-seated capacity of 15,000 located in Cairo Governorate, Egypt. It is the home for El Shams SC and was used as a training center by Ivory Coast at the 2019 Africa Cup of Nations.
