= Rami Ibrahim =

Egyptian basketball player

No. 88 – Al Ittihad Alexandria
- Position: Forward
- League: Egyptian Basketball Super League

Personal information
- Born: February 6, 1988 (age 38)
- Listed height: 6 ft 8 in (2.03 m)

Career information
- Playing career: 2007–present

Career history
- 2007–present: Al Ittihad Alexandria

Rami Ibrahim (born February 6, 1988) is an Egyptian basketball player for Al Ittihad and the Egyptian national team, where he participated at the 2014 FIBA Basketball World Cup.
