= Ismail Ahmad (basketball) =

Egyptian-Lebanese basketball player (born 1976)

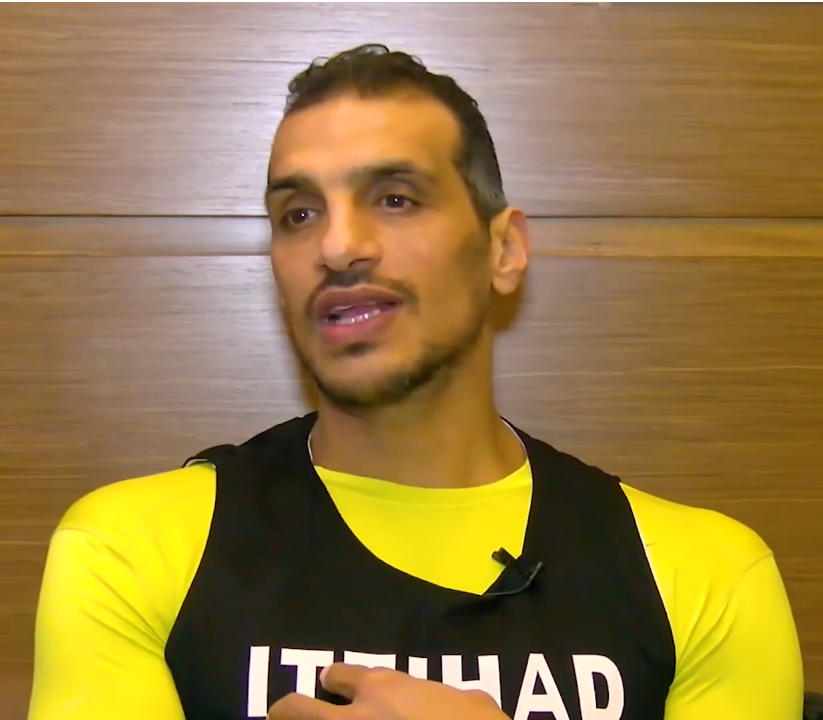

No. 1 – Al Riyadi
- Position: Center / power forward
- League: Lebanese Basketball League

Personal information
- Born: September 23, 1976 (age 50) Alexandria, Egypt
- Listed height: 2.06 m (6 ft 9 in)
- Listed weight: 111 kg (245 lb)

Career information
- Playing career: 1993–present

Career history
- 1993–1996: Al Ittihad Alexandria
- 1996–1997: Rosaire
- 1999: Sagesse
- 2000–2001: Al Riyadi
- 2001–2003: Al Ittihad Alexandria
- 2003–2004: Champville
- 2004–2017: Al Riyadi
- 2017–2018: Homenetmen
- 2018–2020: Al Riyadi
- 2020–2022: Al Ittihad Alexandria
- 2022–present: Al Riyadi
Medals
Men's basketball
Representing Egypt
FIBA Africa Championship
Bronze medal – third place	2001 Casablanca	Team
Bronze medal – third place	2003 Alexandria	Team

Ismail Ahmed Abdelmoneim (Arabic: إسماعيل أحمد عبد المنعم; born September 23, 1976), also known as Somaa, is an Egyptian-Lebanese professional basketball player for Al Riyadi of the Lebanese Basketball League. He was a main member of the Egypt national basketball team that participated in the FIBA Africa Championship 2001 in Casablanca in Morocco and in the FIBA Africa Championship 2003 that took place in Alexandria, Egypt. He is nicknamed "The Egyptian Pharaoh".

== Career ==
Ahmad began his professional career in 1993, when he was 17 and made his debut on Al Ittihad Alexandria of the Egyptian Basketball Super League. In 1996, he traveled to Lebanon to participate in the Arab Club Basketball Championship. He led the team to the championship beating Lebanese Sagesse Beirut.

After the Rosary, he played in 1999 before returning to Egypt to play with Ittihad. He then returned to Lebanon from Champville gate in 2002. On September 22, 2017, he signed with Homenetmen. After one season, he returned to Al Riyadi where he stayed for two more seasons.

In January 2020, Ahmad returned to Al Ittihad Alexandria after 13 years. In his first season he won the 2019–20 Egyptian Basketball Super League and was named the league's Most Valuable Player (MVP). Ahmad also won two Egyptian Cups (in 2020 and 2021) with the team. After the season was suspended due to the COVID-19 pandemic, Ahmad agreed to a 50% salary cut with Ittihad.

On May 17, 2022, Ahmad joined Al Riyadi Beirut for the final stage of the Lebanese Basketball League. On 28 January 2024, he sank a three-pointer that secured his team's 77–74 victory over Strong Group Athletics in the final of the Dubai International Basketball Championship.

== National team career ==
Ahmad has represented the Egypt national basketball team and has won the African Games three times. He also won three bronze medals at the FIBA AfroBasket tournaments.

== Awards and accomplishments ==
=== Club ===
Al Ittihad Alexandria

- Egyptian Basketball Premier League (x3) : 1994–95, 1995–96, 2019–20
- Egypt Basketball Cup (x2) : 2019–20, 2020–21
- Arab Club Basketball Championship (x4) : 1995, 1996, 2002, 2019

Sagesse Beirut

- Arab Club Basketball Championship (x1) : 1998

Al Riyadi Beirut

- Lebanese Basketball League (x16) : 2005–2011, 2014–2017, 2019, 2023, 2024, 2025, 2026
- Lebanese Basketball Cup (x4) : 2006–2008, 2019
- FIBA Asia Champions Cup - Gold Medalist (x2) : 2011, 2024
- WABA Champions Cup (x2) : 2008, 2011
- Arab Club Basketball Championship (x5): 2005, 2006, 2007, 2009, 2010
- FIBA West Asia Super League: 2024, 2025

Champville SC

- Lebanese Basketball Cup (x1): 2004

Homenetmen Beirut BC

- Arab Club Basketball Championship (x1): 2017
- Lebanese Basketball League (x1): 2018
- Lebanese Basketball Cup (x1): 2018

=== Egypt ===
Egypt National Team

- FIBA Africa Championship - Bronze Medalist (x2) : 2001, 2003
- All African Games 2007
- Qualifying to FIFA World Youth Championship in 1997

=== Individual ===
- Egyptian Basketball Super League MVP Award: (2020)
