= 6th of October SC =

- Division: 1984
- League: Egyptian Basketball Super League
- Arena: 6th of October, Egypt
- Location: 6th of October Sports Hall
- Team colors: 5,500
- Website: 6oc.club
Home

6th of October Sports Club (Arabic: نادي 6 أكتوبر الرياضي) is an Egyptian sports club based in the city of 6th of October. Its basketball team plays in the Egyptian Basketball Super League. Home games are played in the 6th of October Sports Hall, which opened in 2020.

In October 2017, 6th of October promoted to the Egyptian Basketball Super League for the first time.
