= Smouha SC (basketball) =

Basketball club in Alexandria, Egypt

Smouha
- Nickname: The Blue Wave (الموج الأزرق)
- Leagues: Egyptian Super League
- Founded: 19 December 1949; 76 years ago
- Arena: Smouha Hall
- Location: Alexandria, Egypt
- Website: smouhaclub.com
Home	Away

Smouha Sporting Club (Arabic: سموحة ٨٢), commonly known simply as Smouha, is an Egyptian professional basketball club from Alexandria. The club competes in the Egyptian Super League, the highest national level.

In the 2018–19 season, Smouha made its debut in the FIBA Africa Basketball League.

== Notable players ==
Marwan Sarhan was one of their best players before Al Ahly decided to buy out his contract from Smouha for £E4M in 2021.

== Honours ==
=== International ===
FIBA Africa Basketball League

- Third place (1): 2018–19 after beating JS Kairouan 58-69.

== In African competitions ==
FIBA Africa Basketball League (1 appearances)

2018–19 – Third Place (bronze)

== Season by season ==
Season	Tier	League	Regular season					Playoffs	Egyptian Cup	International competitions		Head coach
Season	Tier	League	Finish	Played	Wins	Losses	Win%	Playoffs	Egyptian Cup	League	Result	Head coach
Smouha
2018–19	1	Premier League	7th	14	6	8	.429	Quarterfinalist		ABL	Third place	
2019–20	1	Premier League	6th	14	6	8	.429	Quarterfinalist		N/A		
2020–21	1	Premier League	6th	14	5	9	.357	Quarterfinalist		DNQ		
2021–22	1	Premier League	8th	14	3	11	.214	Quarterfinalist		DNQ		
2022–23	1	Premier League	5th	14	5	9	.357	Semi-finalist		DNQ		
2023–24	1	Premier League	6th	14	4	10	.286	Lost quarterfinals (Zamalek) 0–3		DNQ		
