= Al Zohour SC =

Al Zohour
- Nickname: سلة الزهور (The Flower Basket)
- League: Egyptian Basketball Premier League
- Location: Cairo, Egypt
- Chairman: Khalid Hussein
- General manager: Sayed Mustafa
- Head coach: Mamdouh Ibrahim

Al Zohour Sports Club (Arabic: نادى الزهور; literally "Flowers Club"), sometimes romanized as Al Zohor, is a basketball club based in Cairo. The men's team plays in the Egyptian Basketball Premier League, the top level of national basketball.

The team has played in the lower regions of the Premier League, being relegated and promoted between the league and the second level Premier League B.

== Honours ==
Egyptian Basketball Premier League B

- Champions (2): 2019–20, 2022–23

== Season by season ==
Season	Tier	League	Regular season				Playoffs or Play-down
Season	Tier	League	Finish	Wins	Losses	Pct.	Playoffs or Play-down
Al Zohour
2019–20	2	Premier League B	Promoted				
2020–21	1	Premier League	15th	3	11	.214	–
2021–22	2	Premier League B	Unknown				
2022–23	2	Premier League B	Promoted				
2023–24	1	Premier League	13th	5	9	.357	Lost in the classification round (Telecom) 2–3; 1st in the relegation group (4–1)
Regular season record				8	20	.286	
Classification and relegation round				5	4	–	
