= Egyptian Basketball Premier League =

- Organising body: Egyptian Basketball Federation (EBBFED)
- Founded: 1972; 54 years ago
- First season: 1972–73
- Country: Egypt
- Confederation: FIBA Africa
- Number of teams: 16
- Level on pyramid: 1
- Relegation to: Egyptian Basketball Premier League B
- Domestic cup: Egypt Cup
- Supercup: Egypt Super Cup
- International cup: Basketball Africa League (BAL)
- Current champions: Al Ahly (9th title) (2025–26)
- Most championships: Zamalek (15 titles)
- TV partners: OnTime Sports, Nile Sports
- Website: egypt.basketball
- 2023–24 Egyptian Basketball Premier League

The Egyptian Basketball Premier League (Arabic: بطولة الدورى العام الممتاز (أ) رجال) is the top professional basketball division of the Egyptian basketball league system. Administered by the Egyptian Basketball Federation (EBBFED), it is contested by 16 teams, with the two lowest-placed teams relegated to the Egyptian Basketball Premier League B and replaced by the top two teams in that division.

A total of five clubs have been crowned champions of the Egyptian Basketball Super League since its inception in 1972, with Zamalek winning the title a record 15 times and Al Ittihad 14 times, though the Egyptian Basketball Super League also saw other champions, including Gezira (11 times), Al Ahly (9 times) and Sporting (3 times). The champions of each season qualify for the Basketball Africa League (BAL) regular season.

== Format ==
The Premier League is the basic and qualifying league for the Basketball Africa League (BAL), as Egypt has been identified as a key market by the league's organisation.

The typical season currently consists of three stages:

1. The preliminary stage: where 1 meets 16, 2 meets 15, and so on in terms of ranking in the Mortabt-League.
2. The regular season: After the rise of eight teams compete among themselves In back and forth matches. The season is divided into the Super League (teams ranked 1st–8th) and the bottom group (teams ranked 9th–16th).
3. Playoffs stage: It starts from the final round, where the 1st place holder of the regular league meets the 8th place holder in a series of three matches, then the semi-finals and the final is a series of 5 matches.
4. Classification stages: possibly, the lower-ranked teams from the regular season play each other in a play-off format to determine the final rankings as well as relegation.

== Clubs ==
=== 2023–24 teams ===
The following 16 teams play in the 2023–24 Egyptian Basketball Premier League:.

Club	Location	Venue
Al Ahly SC	Cairo	Al Ahly Sports Hall
Al Ittihad	Alexandria	Kamal Shalaby Hall
Tala'ea Al Gaish	Cairo	Tala'ea El Gaish Hall
Aviation Club	Cairo	
Al Zohour SC	Cairo	
Desouk SC	Desouk	
Eastern Company SC	Cairo	
El Shams SC	Cairo	
Egypt Insurance	Cairo	
Gezira SC	Cairo (Zamalek)	Cairo Stadium
Heliopolis SC	Cairo	Heliopolis Hall
Horse Owners' Club	Alexandria	
Olympic Club	Alexandria	El Olympi Arena
Smouha SC	Alexandria	Smouha Arena
Sporting Alexandria	Alexandria	Sporting Club Hall
Suez Canal	Ismailia	
Telecom Egypt	Cairo	
Zamalek SC	Giza	Abdulrahman Fawzi Hall

=== Former teams ===
Club	Location	Founded	Last season
6th of October SC	6th of October	1984	2020
Desouk	Desouk		
El Shams	Cairo	1962	2022
El Teram	Alexandria		2019
Geziret El Ward	Mansoura		2021
Horse Owners' Club	Alexandria	1934	2023
Tanta	Tanta	1928	2022

== List of champions ==
Season	Champion	Series	Runners-up	MVP	Ref.
1972–73	Gezira (1)	3–0	Zamalek		
1973–74	Zamalek (1)	3–0	Al Ahly		
1974–75	Zamalek (2)	3–0	Al Ahly		
1975–76	Zamalek (3)	6–7	Al Ahly		
1976–77	Zamalek (4)	3–1	Ismaily		
1977–78	Zamalek (5)	3–0	Olympic Club		
1978–79	Al Ittihad (1)	3–2	Zamalek		
1979–80	Zamalek (6)	3–2	Al Ittihad		
1980–81	Zamalek (7)	3–1	Al Ittihad		
1981–82	Al Ittihad (2)	3–2	Zamalek		
1982–83	Al Ittihad (3)	3–1	Zamalek		
1983–84	Al Ittihad (4)	3–0	Olympic Club		
1984–85	Cancelled				
1985–86	Al Ittihad (5)	3–1	Zamalek		
1986–87	Al Ittihad (6)	3–1	Zamalek		
1987–88	Zamalek (8)	3–0	Al Ittihad		
1988–89	Al Ahly (1)	3–2	Zamalek		
1989–90	Al Ittihad (7)	3–2	Zamalek		
1990–91	Zamalek (9)	3–1	Al Ahly		
1991–92	Al Ittihad (8)	3–1	Al Ahly		
1992–93	Gezira (2)	3–0	Zamalek		
1993–94	Gezira (3)	3–2	Al Ahly		
1994–95	Al Ittihad (9)	3–2	Zamalek		
1995–96	Cancelled				
1996–97	Zamalek (10)	3–2	Al Ahly		
1997–98	Zamalek (11)	3–1	Al Ahly		
1998–99	Al Ittihad (10)	3–1	Al Ahly		
1999–00	Al Ahly (2)	3–1	Zamalek		
2000–01	Al Ahly (3)	3–0	Zamalek		
2001–02	Gezira (4)	3–2	Al Ahly		
2002–03	Zamalek (12)	3–1	Gezira		
2003–04	Gezira (5)	3–2	Tersana		
2004–05	Gezira (6)	3–0	Tersana		
2005–06	Gezira (7)	3–1	Zamalek		
2006–07	Zamalek (13)	3–1	Gezira		
2007–08	Gezira (8)	3–1	Zamalek	—N/a	
2008–09	Al Ittihad (11)	3–0	Al Ahly	Wael Badr	
2009–10	Al Ittihad (12)	3–1	Gezira		
2010–11	Gezira (9)	3–1	Zamalek	—N/a	
2011–12	Al Ahly (4)	3–0	Gezira		
2012–13	Sporting Alexandria (1)	3–0	Al Ittihad		
2013–14	Gezira (10)	3–1	Al Ittihad		
2014–15	Sporting Alexandria (2)	3–1	Al Ittihad	MaJic Dorsey	
2015–16	Al Ahly (5)	3–2	Sporting Alexandria		
2016–17	Gezira (11)	3–1	Sporting Alexandria		
2017–18	Sporting Alexandria (3)	3–2	Gezira		
2018–19	Zamalek (14)	3–2	Gezira	Terrell Stoglin	
2019–20	Al Ittihad (13)	3–1	Al Ahly	Ismail Ahmed	
2020–21	Zamalek (15)	3–2	Al Ittihad	Anas Mahmoud	
2021–22	Al Ahly (6)	3–2	Al Ittihad	Ehab Amin	
2022–23	Al Ahly (7)	3–1	Al Ittihad	Ehab Amin	
2023–24	Al Ittihad (14)	3–1	Al Ahly	Ahmed Adel	
2024–25	Al Ahly (8)	3–2	Al Ittihad	Ehab Amin	
2025–26	Al Ahly (9)	3–1	Al Ittihad	Amr Zahran	

== Titles by club ==
Thus far, five teams have won the Premier League at least once. Zamalek holds the record for most championship with fifteen titles.

Club	Titles	Winning seasons
Zamalek	15	1973–74, 1974–75, 1975–76, 1976–77, 1977–78, 1979–80, 1980–81, 1987–88, 1990–91, 1996–97, 1997–98, 2002–03, 2006–07, 2018–19, 2020–21
Al Ittihad	14	1978–79, 1981–82, 1982–83, 1983–84, 1985–86, 1986–87, 1989–90, 1991–92, 1994–95, 1998–99, 2008–09, 2009–10, 2019–20, 2023–24
Gezira	11	1972–73, 1992–93, 1993–94, 2001–02, 2003–04, 2004–05, 2005–06, 2007–08, 2010–11, 2013–14, 2016–17
Al Ahly	9	1988–89, 1999–00, 2000–01, 2011–12, 2015–16, 2021–22, 2022–23, 2024–25, 2025–26
Sporting	3	2012–13, 2014–15, 2017–18
