= Egypt Basketball Cup =

- Founded: 1974; 52 years ago
- First season: 1974–1975
- Country: Egypt
- Confederation: FIBA Africa
- Number of teams: 32
- Current champions: Zamalek (14th title) (2026)
- Most championships: Al Ittihad Alexandria (basketball) (15 titles)
- TV partners: OnTime Sports
- Website: egypt.basketball
- 2025 Egyptian Basketball Cup

The Egypt Basketball Cup is an annual knockout competition for Egyptian basketball teams. The competition was established in 1975, it is organised by the Egyptian Basketball Federation.

== List of winners ==
Season	Winner	Runners-up	Score	Ref.
1974–1975	Zamalek	Gezira	68-63	
1975–1976	Al Ittihad	Zamalek	82-76	
1976–1977	Sporting	Al Ahly	61-59	
1977–1978	Al Ittihad	Zamalek	83-76	
1978–1979	Zamalek	Gezira		
1979–1980	(Zamalek) The championship is credited to Zamalek Club because it won the previous championship, as stipulated by the championship law in Egypt.			
1980–1981	Zamalek	Al Ahly		
1981–1982	Al Ittihad	Zamalek	61-39 ??	
1982–1983	Al Ittihad			
1983–1984	Al Ittihad	Zamalek	63-71 ?? ??	
1984–1985	(Al Ittihad) The championship is credited to Al Ittihad Club because it won the previous championship, as stipulated by the championship law in Egypt.			
1985–1986	Al Ittihad	Al Ahly		
1986–1987	(Al Ittihad) The championship is credited to Al Ittihad Club because it won the previous championship, as stipulated by the championship law in Egypt.			
1987–1988	Al Ahly	Al Ittihad	69-62	
1988–1989	Al Ittihad	Zamalek	84-71; 86-75	
1989–1990	Gezira	Al Ittihad		
1990–1991	Zamalek	Al Ittihad	99-108; 108-107; 101-92	
1991–1992	(Zamalek) The championship is credited to Zamalek Club because it won the previous championship, as stipulated by the championship law in Egypt.			
1992–1993	Al Ahly	Gezira	55-52	
1993–1994	Gezira	Al Ahly	77-74	
1994–1995	Al Ahly	Al Ittihad	78-74	
1995–1996	None			
1996–1997	Zamalek	Al Ahly		
1997–1998	Zamalek	Al Ittihad		
1998–1999	Al Ahly	Al Ittihad	68-55	
1999–2000	Zamalek			
2000–2001	Zamalek			
2001–2002	Zamalek			
2002–2003	Zamalek			
2003–2004	Al Ahly	Zamalek	62-60	
2004–2005	Gezira			
2005–2006	Zamalek	Gezira	91-79	
2006–2007	Al Ahly	Zamalek	76-69	
2007–2008	Sporting			
2008–2009	Al Ahly	Al Ittihad	66-57	
2009–2010	Al Ittihad	Gezira	78-71	
2010–2011	Al Ahly	Smouha	86-57	
2011–2012	Al Ittihad	Al Ahly	83-75	
2012–2013	Sporting	Al Ittihad	79-61	
2013–2014	Sporting	Al Ahly	79-76	
2014–2015	Sporting	Al Ahly	80-69	
2015–2016	Sporting	Al Ahly	87-81	
2016–2017	Sporting	Al Ahly	73–71	
2017–2018	Al Ahly	Sporting	72-69	
2018–2019	Gezira	Al Ahly	80-79	
2019–2020	Al Ittihad	Al Ahly	76-73	
2020–2021	Al Ittihad	Al Ahly	78-76	
2021–2022	Al Ahly	Al Ittihad	69-65	
2022–2023	Al Ahly	Zamalek	72-65	
2023–2024	Al Ittihad	Al Ahly	68-65	
2024–2025	Al Ittihad	Al Ahly	85-83	
2025–2026	Zamalek	Telecom Egypt	87-68	

== Titles by club ==
Club	Titles	Winning seasons
Al Ittihad	13 (2)	1975–76, 1977–78, 1981–82 ,1982–83, 1983–84, 1985–86, 1988–89, 2009–10, 2011–12, 2019–20, 2020–21, 2023–24, 2024–25 (Controversial 1984–85, 1986–87)
Zamalek	12 (2)	1974–75, 1978–79, 1980–81, 1990–91, 1996–97, 1997–98, 1999–20, 2000–01, 2001–02, 2002–03, 2005–06, 2025–26 (Controversial 1979–80, 1991–92)
Al Ahly	11	1987–88, 1992–93, 1994–95, 1998–99, 2003–04, 2006–07, 2008–09, 2010–11, 2017–18, 2021–22, 2022–23
Sporting Alexandria	7	1976–77, 2007–08, 2012–13, 2013–14, 2014–15, 2015–16, 2016–17
Gezira	4	1989–90, 1993–94, 2004–05, 2018–19

== Most Valuable Players ==
Season	Player	Club	Ref.
2021–22	Ehab Amin	Al Ahly	
2022–23	Omar Oraby	Al Ahly	
2023–24	Anas Mahmoud	Al Ittihad	
