= El Shams SC =

Sports team in Cairo, Egypt

El Shams Club
- Full name: El Shams Club
- Founded: 1962; 63 years ago
- Ground: El-Shams Stadium, 20,000 capacity Cairo, Egypt
- Owner: Osama Abu Zaid
- Manager: Ahmed Eid Abdelmalek
- League: Egyptian Third Division
Home colours	Away colours

El Shams SC (Arabic: الشمس; lit. 'The Sun Sporting Club') is an Egyptian football and basketball club based in Cairo, Egypt. They are currently a member of Egyptian Second Division, the second flight of Egyptian football.

== History ==
The club was founded in May 1962 as sports social club and was called the Heliopolis Sporting Club (El Shams), based in the northern section of Cairo Governorate.

El Shams football team participated only once in the Egyptian Premier League and that was in 1997–98. The team managed by Irishman Stephen O'Neill won 5, drew 9, and lost 16 matches earning the 16th place (last place) with Benito M'Parlando finishing top scorer with 7 league goals. As a result, the team was relegated to the Egyptian Premier B.

== Basketball team ==
El Shams fields a men's basketball that has played in the Egyptian Basketball Premier League.
