= Horse Owners' Club =

Sports club based in Alexandria, Egypt

Horse Owners' Club (Arabic: نادى اصحاب الجياد الاسكندرية), also known as Ashab Aljead, is an Egyptian sports and cultural club based in Alexandria, Egypt. Founded on 23 August 1934, it is located on the 14th of May Bridge Road. The club exists of a basketball, Association football, volleyball and handball teams at Egypt's highest levels.

The men's basketball team plays in the Egyptian Basketball Premier League, the highest national level.
