= Misr Insurance =

- League: Egyptian Super League
- History: Shark Insurance until 2009; Misr Insurance; 2009–present
- Arena: The Arab Contractors Hall
- Location: Alexandria, Egypt
- Ownership: Misr Insurance Company

Misr Insurance (Arabic: مصر للتأمين), sometimes translated as Egypt Insurance, is an Egyptian professional basketball club based in Alexandria. The team plays in the Egyptian Basketball Super League, the highest level league in the country.

The team is owned by and named after the insurance company Misr Life Insurance.

== Notable players ==
Note: Flags indicate national team eligibility at FIBA-sanctioned events. Players may hold other non-FIBA nationalities not displayed.

Criteria

To appear in this section a player must have either:

- Set a club record or won an individual award while at the club
- Played at least one official international match for their national team at any time
- Played at least one official NBA match at any time.

- (Egypt) Mostafa Meshaal
