= Heliopolis Sporting Club =

Sporting Club in Egypt

- Type: Club
- Genre: Sports
- Founded: January 1, 1910; 116 years ago
- Founder: Cairo Electric Railways and Heliopolis Oases Company
- Headquarters: Heliopolis, Cairo, Egypt
- Key people: Amr El Sonbaty Chairman; Mohamed Sedki Vice Chairman; Mohamed El Menshawy Treasurer
- Website: www.heliopolisclub.com

Heliopolis Sporting Club (Arabic: نادى هليوبوليس الرياضى; pronounced as nādī Heliopolis al-reyādī) is an Egyptian sports club based in Heliopolis, Cairo. Founded in 1910, it is one of the country's largest sports clubs.

== Club's history ==
The Heliopolis Sporting Club was founded in Cairo on January 1, 1910, by the Cairo Electric Railways and Heliopolis Oases Company, which managed the club until December 31, 1921. On January 1, 1922, the club members took over the management by a contract signed with the company.

The club was part of the newly-built Heliopolis suburb and was designed by Ernest Jaspar. Its activities included water polo, swimming, diving, squash, tennis, golf, cricket, hockey, bridge, bowling, football, handball, basketball, volleyball, speed ball, ballet, gymnastics, snooker, athletics, and different kinds of dancing.

In 1947, the area of the club was reduced to its present size after the company took back the land of the golf course. Golf was cancelled after the frequent objections of club members to the large expenses incurred by the game, which was not played by many members.

== Shorouk branch ==
Heliopolis Sporting Club has another branch, in Shorouk city.

== Current sports ==
- Aikido
- Athletics
- Basketball
- Boxing
- Diving
- Football
- Gymnastics
- Handball
- Judo
- Kung-fu
- Speedball
- Squash
- Swimming
- Table tennis
- Taekwondo
- Tennis
- Volleyball
- Water polo
- Water ballet
