= Al Ittihad Alexandria (basketball) =

Al Ittihad
- Nickname: Masters of the City (سيد البلد)
- Leagues: Egyptian Super League; BAL
- Founded: 1914; 112 years ago
- History: Al Ittihad Alexandria (1914–present)
- Arena: Kamal Shalaby Hall
- Location: Alexandria, Alexandria Governorate, Egypt
- President: Mohamed Mouselhy
- Head coach: Ahmed Omar
- Team captain: Ismail Ahmed
- 2025–26 position: Super League, 2nd
- Championships: 1 FIBA Africa Champions Cup; 16 Egyptian Super Leagues; 14 Egyptian Cups; 7 Arab Championships
- Website: None
| Home | Away | Third |

Al Ittihad Alexandria (Arabic: نادي الإتحاد السكندري; transl. Union Alexandria Club) is an Egyptian professional basketball club based in Alexandria. Founded in 1914, the team plays in the Egyptian Basketball Premier League. The team is widely considered the basketball powerhouse of Egypt, having won a record 16 Premier League championships, a record 14 Egyptian Cups and 3 Super Cups. In continental and international competitions, Ittihad has won the FIBA Africa Champions Cup (BAL) in 1987, its only African continental title. The team has also won the Arab Championship a record 7 seven times.

The team plays its home games in the Kamal Shalaby Hall. Al Ittihad is nicknamed Masters of the City.

== Honours ==
=== Domestic ===
- Egyptian Super League
  - Winners (16): 1979, 1982, 1983, 1984, 1985, 1986, 1987, 1990, 1992, 1995, 1996, 1999, 2009, 2010, 2020, 2024
- Egyptian Cup
  - Winners (15): 1976, 1978, 1982 ,1983, 1984, 1985, 1986, 1987, 1989, 2010, 2012, 2020, 2021, 2024, 2025
- Egyptian Super Cup
  - Winners (4): 2020, 2021, 2022, 2024 (Note: The 2022 Egypt Basketball Super Cup was suspended after a stand in the stadium collapsed and 27 fans got injured. Afterwards, the game was rescheduled but opponent Al Ahly conceded the game, giving an automatic win to Al Ittihad.)

=== International ===
- FIBA Africa Champions Cup
  - Winners (1): 1987
  - Runners-up (1): 1996
  - Fourth place (1): 2012
- Arab Championship
  - Winners (7): 1987, 1991, 1994, 1996, 2002, 2018, 2019
- Bahraini-Egyptian Super Cup
  - Winners (1): 2024

== Players ==
=== Current roster ===
Al Ittihad roster
Players
Coaches

| Pos. | No. | Nat. | Name | Ht. | Wt. | Age |
|---|---|---|---|---|---|---|
| PG | 0 | (Egypt) | Metwaly, Ahmed | 1.80 m (5 ft 11 in) | 80 kg (176 lb) | 29 – 15 February 1997 |
| PG | 3 | (Egypt) | Shehata, Yusuf | 1.83 m (6 ft 0 in) | 79 kg (174 lb) | 30 – 16 January 1996 |
| PG | 4 | (Qatar) | Fouda, Moustafa | 1.74 m (5 ft 9 in) | 80 kg (176 lb) | 28 – 15 November 1997 |
| SG | 5 | (United States) | Johnson, Dominique (I) | 1.93 m (6 ft 4 in) | 88 kg (194 lb) | 39 – 9 June 1987 |
| C | 6 | (Egypt) | Khalifa, Haytham | 2.08 m (6 ft 10 in) | 106 kg (234 lb) | 38 – 17 November 1987 |
| SF | 7 | (Egypt) | Behiry, Hatem | 1.96 m (6 ft 5 in) | 90 kg (198 lb) | 33 – 30 November 1992 |
| SG | 9 | (Egypt) | Mohamed, Mido | 1.84 m (6 ft 0 in) | 85 kg (187 lb) | 30 – 6 July 1996 |
| C | 10 | (Egypt) | Mahmoud, Anas | 2.13 m (7 ft 0 in) | 95 kg (209 lb) | 31 – 9 May 1995 |
| SF | 12 | (Egypt) | Aboushousha, Youssef | 1.93 m (6 ft 4 in) | 87 kg (192 lb) | 33 – 9 June 1993 |
| G/F | 13 | (Egypt) | El Sabbagh, Ahmed (C) | 1.91 m (6 ft 3 in) | 95 kg (209 lb) | 41 – 26 May 1985 |
| G/F | 20 | (Egypt) (Greece) | Saleh, Yaser | 1.95 m (6 ft 5 in) | 104 kg (229 lb) | 28 – 30 September 1998 |
| C | 22 | (Egypt) | Khalaf, Ahmed | 2.11 m (6 ft 11 in) | 95 kg (209 lb) | 27 – 24 February 1999 |
| G | 29 | (United States) | Cherry, Will (I) | 1.85 m (6 ft 1 in) | 80 kg (176 lb) | 35 – 8 February 1991 |
| PF | 42 | (Egypt) | Ahmed, Aly | 2.06 m (6 ft 9 in) | 113 kg (249 lb) | 34 – 15 March 1992 |
| PF | 88 | (Egypt) | Ibrahim, Rami | 2.05 m (6 ft 9 in) | 102 kg (225 lb) | 38 – 6 February 1988 |

Head coach

- (Serbia) Miodrag Perisic
- (Germany) Henrik Rödl

Legend

- (C) Team captain
- (I) Import player
- Injured

- Roster
Updated: January 31, 2023

=== Notable players ===
Note: Flags indicate national team eligibility at FIBA-sanctioned events. Players may hold other non-FIBA nationalities not displayed.

Criteria

To appear in this section a player must have either:

- Set a club record or won an individual award while at the club
- Played at least one official international match for their national team at any time
- Played at least one official NBA match at any time.

- (Egypt) Ismail Ahmed: (1993–1997; 2001–2003; 2020–2022)
- (Egypt) Mouhanad El-Sabagh: (2006–2016)
- (Ivory Coast) Solo Diabate: (2021)
- (New Zealand) Corey Webster: (2021–2022)

== Season by season ==
| Season | Tier | League | Regular season | | | | | Playoffs | Egyptian Cup | International competitions | | Head coach |
| Season | Tier | League | Finish | Played | Wins | Losses | Win% | Playoffs | Egyptian Cup | League | Result | Head coach |
|---|---|---|---|---|---|---|---|---|---|---|---|---|
Al Ittihad Alexandria
| 2016–17 | 1 | Premier League | 5th | 12 | 6 | 9 | .400 | N/A | | DNQ | | |
| 2017–18 | 1 | Premier League | 3rd | 12 | 7 | 5 | .583 | Quarterfinalist | | DNQ | | |
| 2018–19 | 1 | Premier League | 1st | 14 | 10 | 4 | .714 | Semifinalist | QF | DNQ | | |
| 2019–20 | 1 | Premier League | 1st | 14 | 12 | 2 | .857 | Champions | Champion | Not held | | Ahmed Marei |
| 2020–21 | 1 | Premier League | 1st | 14 | 12 | 2 | .857 | Runners-up | Champion | DNQ | | Ahmed Marei |
| 2021–22 | 1 | Premier League | 1st | 14 | 11 | 3 | .786 | Runners-up | Runner-up | Arab Championship | 4th | Ahmed Marei |
| 2022–23 | 1 | Premier League | 1st | 14 | 13 | 1 | .929 | Runners-up | SF | Arab Championship | QF | Miodrag Perišić /Henrik Rödl |
| 2023–24 | 1 | Premier League | 1st | 14 | 13 | 1 | .929 | Champions | Champion | Arab Championship | Runners-up | Ahmed Omar |
| 2024–25 | 1 | Premier League | 2nd | 5 | 4 | 1 | .800 | Runners-up | Champion | BAL | 4th | Ahmed Omar |

== Head coaches ==
- (Egypt) Ahmed Marei: (2019–2022)
- (Serbia) Miodrag Perišić: (June – October 2022)
- (Germany) Henrik Rödl: (2022–2023)
- (Egypt) Ahmed Omar: (2023–present)

== See also ==
- Al Ittihad Alexandria Club
