= Gezira (basketball) =

- Leagues: Egyptian Super League
- Arena: Cairo Stadium Indoor Halls Complex
- Capacity: 1,620
- Location: Zamalek, Cairo Governorate, Egypt
- Team colors: Blue, Yellow and Green
- Championships: 11 Egyptian Basketball Super League; 4 Egypt Cup; 2 Arab Club Basketball Championship; 2 FIBA Africa Basketball League

Gezira Sporting Club (Arabic: نادى الجزيرة الرياضى) is a basketball club located on the island of Zamalek in Cairo, Egypt that plays in the Egyptian Basketball Super League. The club has won nine league titles, most recently in 2017.

== Achievements ==
- Egyptian Basketball Super League

Champions (11): 1973, 1993, 1994, 2002, 2004, 2005, 2006, 2008, 2011, 2014‚ 2017

- Egypt Cup

Champions (4): 1989–90, 1993–94, 2004–05, 2018–19

- Arab Club Basketball Championship

Champions (3): 1993, 2000, 2001
Runners-up (2): 1995, 2004
Third place (2): 2002, 2005

- FIBA Africa Basketball League

Champions (2): 1994, 1996

== Players ==
=== Current roster ===
Note: Flags indicate national team eligibility at FIBA-sanctioned events. Players may hold other non-FIBA nationalities not displayed.

Gezira roster
Players
Coaches

Pos.	No.	Nat.	Name
SF	20	(Egypt)	Okasha, Motaz
F		(Egypt)	Kardani, Mohamed
C		(Egypt)	Ismail, Ahmed
SG	44	(Egypt)	Elsadani, Romeh
C	12	(Egypt)	Elsandily, Seifeldin
SF	7	(Egypt)	Abdelrahman, Mohamed

Head coach

- (Egypt) Mohamed Kardani

Legend

- (C) Team captain
- (I) Import player
- Injured

- Roster
Updated: 30 May 2021

=== Notable players ===
Note: Flags indicate national team eligibility at FIBA-sanctioned events. Players may hold other non-FIBA nationalities not displayed.

Criteria

To appear in this section a player must have either:

- Set a club record or won an individual award while at the club
- Played at least one official international match for their national team at any time
- Played at least one official NBA match at any time.

- (Egypt) Amr Gendy (5 seasons: 2013–18)
- (Egypt) Motaz Okasha (2014–present)
- (Rwanda) Kenneth Gasana (1 season: 2014–15)
- (Ivory Coast) Stéphane Konaté (1 season: 2013–14)

== See also ==
- Gezira Sporting Club
