= Alexandria Sporting Club =

- Nickname: Sporting, ASC
- League: Egyptian Super League
- Founded: 10 September 1890; 136 years ago
- Arena: Sporting Club Hall
- Location: Alexandria, Egypt
- Team colors: Green and red
- President: Prof. Ahmed Hassan
- Website: www.alexsportingclub.com
Home	Away

Alexandria Sporting Club (Arabic: نادي الإسكندرية الرياضي), more commonly known as Sporting (سبورتنج), is an Egyptian sports and social club based in Alexandria, Egypt. Founded in 1890, the club is one of the oldest in Egypt, second only to Gezira Sporting Club in Cairo. In 1952, it was taken over by the Egyptian government and became a national club.

Sporting Club sits on 100 acres of land in the Sporting district of Alexandria and serves nearly 100,000 members, making it by far the largest colonial-era club and one of the largest clubs in the country. The club is one of the most competitive clubs in Alexandria, regularly contending in national competitions in a wide range of sports.

The club's basketball team is a three-time Egyptian Basketball Premier League champion, most recently winning the 2017–18 season title.

Sporting's women's team won the FIBA Africa Women's Clubs Champions Cup in 2022, becoming the first Egyptian club to win the competition. In 2023, Sporting won its second consecutive title.

== History ==
Sporting Club was established in 1890 by Prince Omar Tusson with the help of the colonial British administration in Alexandria, who would, in Sporting’s early days, dominate the membership in the club. Being the first major sports club in Alexandria, it introduced many sports that could have only played in the capital or abroad in Europe, such as tennis and golf. Founded 8 years after Gezira Sporting Club, the oldest and most prestigious club in Egypt, it functioned similarly to it, Egyptians were largely barred from membership unless they came from wealthy backgrounds, this gradually shifted up until 1952, just before the club was nationalised by the Egyptian government.

After 1952, foreigners were excluded from membership entirely and were replaced by native Egyptians. The club is run by its own members in collaboration with the ministry of youth and sports, just like the vast majority of clubs in Egypt.

== Honours ==
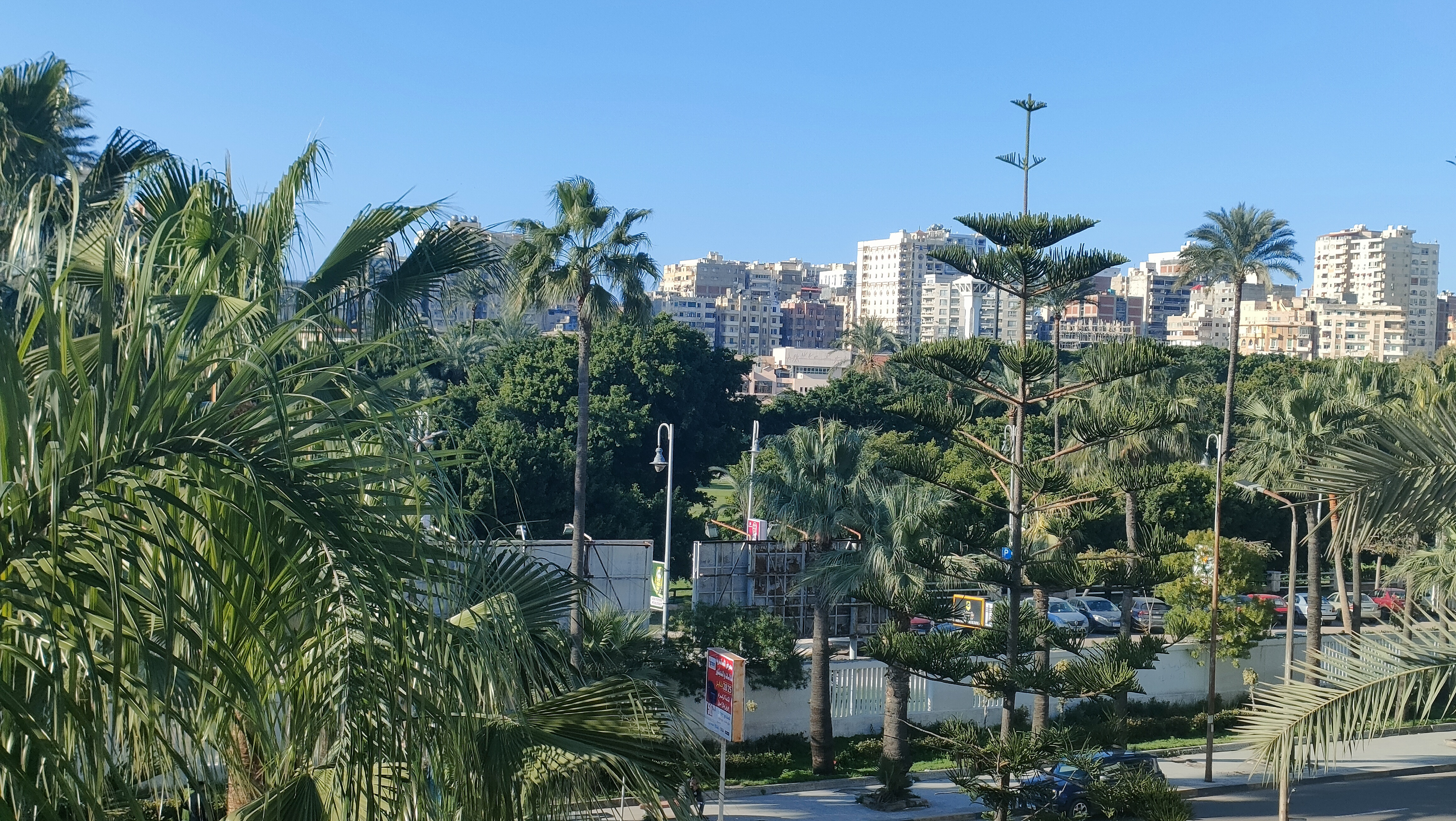
View

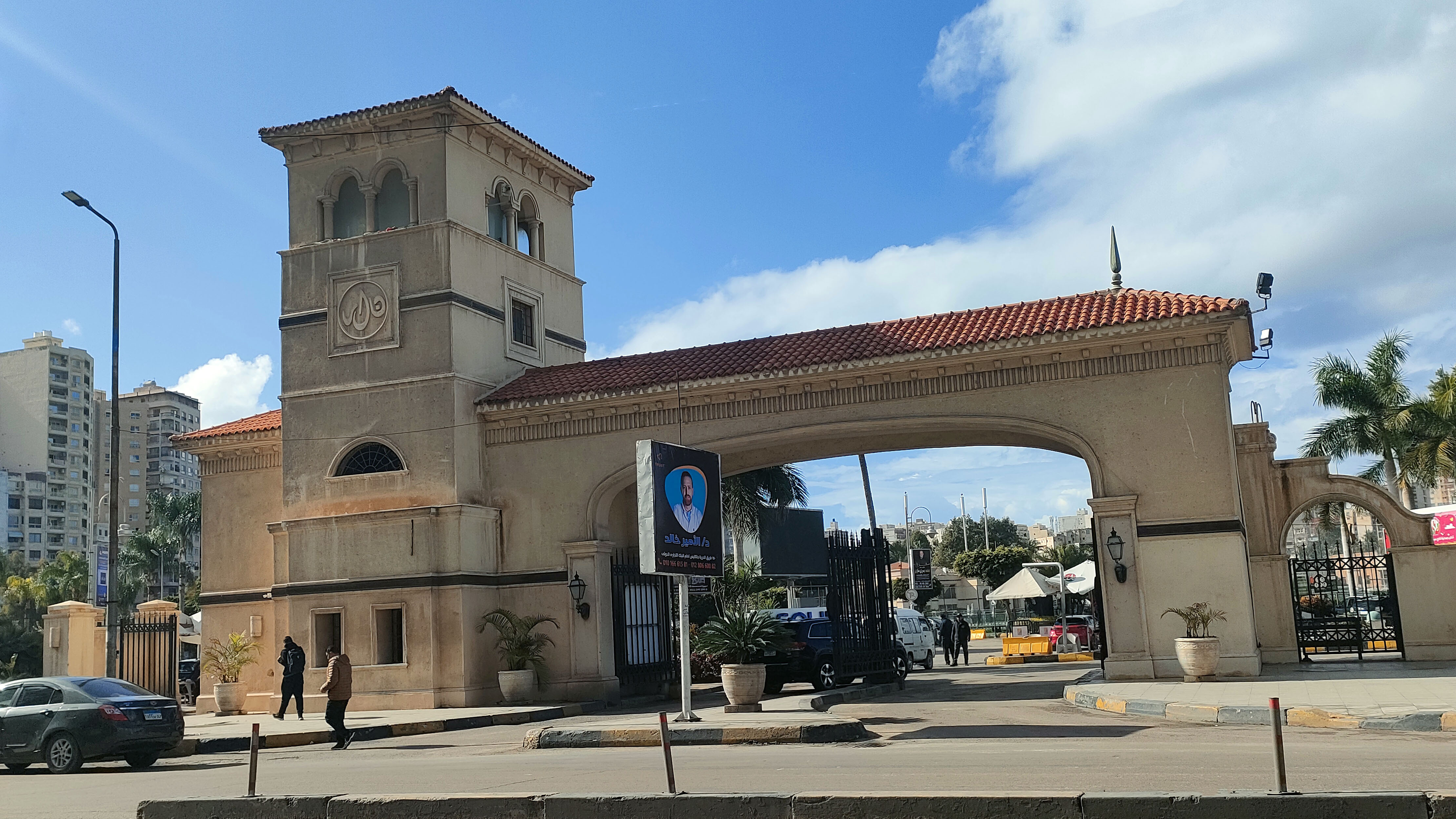
Gate

=== Men's team ===
==== National ====
- Egypt Super League

Champions (3): 2012–13, 2014–15, 2017–18

- Egypt Basketball Cup

Champions (7): 1976–77, 2007–08, 2012–13, 2013–14, 2014–15, 2015–16, 2016–17

- Egyptian Mortabat League

Champions (2): 2012–13, 2013–14

==== International ====
FIBA Africa Basketball League

- Fourth Place (2): 2013, 2014

=== Women's team ===
==== National ====
Egyptian Basketball Women's League

- Champions (2): 2021, 2022

Egyptian Basketball Women's Cup

- Winners (2): 2013, 2020

Egyptian Basketball Women's SuperCup

- Winners (2): 2017, 2021

==== International ====
FIBA Africa Women's Basketball League

- Champions (2): 2022, 2023
- Fourth Place (1): 2019

== Rivalries ==
=== Ittihad SC ===
Both clubs are Egyptian giants in basketball, when they face each other in the Alexandria derby, it’s often in the late stages of The Egyptian Basketball Super League. While the Al Ittihad men’s team has historically been superior to Sporting, Sporting’s women’s team has achieved continental success, including winning the FIBA Africa Women's Basketball League, which Ittihad’s women’s team is yet to achieve.

=== Smouha Sporting Club ===
Smouha is Sporting’s main rival outside of basketball, with both clubs being competitive in handball, volleyball, water polo, and squash. A strong friendly rivalry has formed between the youth of the two clubs. Both clubs are the two largest and most dominant clubs in Alexandria and two of the biggest clubs in Egypt.

== Notable players ==
To appear in this section a player must have either:

- Set a club record or won an individual award as a professional player.
- Played at least one official international match for his senior national team or one NBA game at any time.

- (Egypt) Omar Abdeen
- (Egypt) Ahmed Mounir

== Other sports ==
=== Volleyball ===
The club is currently active in the Egyptian Volleyball League

=== Football ===
The club is currently active in the Egyptian Second Division A

==== Honours ====
- Egyptian Third Division: 2019–20 (Group 11)

=== Handball ===
The club is currently active in the Egyptian Professional League

==== Honours ====
- Egyptian Professional Super Cup: 2019
- Egypt Cup: 2022
- African Champions League runners-up: 2019
- Arab Championship of Champions: 1997
