= 2020–21 Zamalek SC (basketball) season =

Zamalek
2020–21 season
- President: (Egypt) Hussein Labib (Interim)
- Head coach: (Spain) Augustí Julbe
- Arena: The Covered Hall Abdulrahman Fawzi Hall
- (Egypt) Egyptian Basketball Super League: Champions
- Basketball Africa League: Champions
- Egypt Basketball Cup: Semi-Final
- Scoring leader: Walter Hodge
- Biggest win: 108-55 vs Al Zohour
- Biggest defeat: 56-83 vs Al Ittihad
Home	Away
- All statistics correct as of 23 September 2021.

2020–21 Zamalek SC was a season of the Zamalek club. The club competes for local championships such as the League, Cup and Continental in the Basketball Africa League because it is the champion of the 2019 League.

== Rosters ==
=== Egyptian Super League roster ===
Zamalek roster
Players
Coaches

Pos.	No.	Nat.	Name	Ht.	Age
PG	00	(United States Virgin Islands)	Hodge, Walter (I)	1.83 m (6 ft 0 in)	40 – 21 September 1986
PG	2	(Egypt)	Abdalatif, Mohab	1.93 m (6 ft 4 in)	24 – 7 June 2002
PF	10	(Egypt)	Osama Mahmoud, Anas	2.13 m (7 ft 0 in)	31 – 9 May 1995
SG	12	(Egypt)	Salem, Islam	1.91 m (6 ft 3 in)	37 – 20 March 1989
PG	14	(Egypt)	Hatem, Ahmed	1.91 m (6 ft 3 in)	31 – 2 September 1995
SG	15	(Egypt)	Hesham, Omar	1.91 m (6 ft 3 in)	31 – 29 March 1995
F	23	(Egypt)	Yasser, Ahmed	1.98 m (6 ft 6 in)	25 – 18 June 2001
F	41	(Egypt)	El-Saharty, Haytham (C)	1.96 m (6 ft 5 in)	41 – 26 August 1985
F	44	(Egypt)	Meshaal, Mostafa	1.96 m (6 ft 5 in)	40 – 11 March 1986
PF	50	(Egypt)	Kejo, Mostafa	2.03 m (6 ft 8 in)	32 – 24 October 1994
C		(Egypt)	Hegazy, Mohammed
C		(Egypt)	Elmashad, Hazem

Head coach

- (Spain) Augustí Julbe

Assistant coach(es)

- (Egypt) Samir Gouda
- (Egypt) Yaser Mohamed

Legend

- (C) Team captain
- (I) Import player
- Injured

- Roster

=== BAL roster ===
The following was Zamalek's 13-man roster for the 2021 BAL season.

Zamalek roster
Players
Coaches

Pos.	No.	Nat.	Name	Ht.	Age
PG	00	(United States Virgin Islands)	Hodge, Walter (I)	1.83 m (6 ft 0 in)	40 – 21 September 1986
PG	1	(Ivory Coast)	Diabate, Mouloukou (I)	1.83 m (6 ft 0 in)	39 – 21 July 1987
PG	2	(Egypt)	Abdalatif, Mohab	1.93 m (6 ft 4 in)	24 – 7 June 2002
PF	10	(Egypt)	Osama Mahmoud, Anas	2.13 m (7 ft 0 in)	31 – 9 May 1995
SG	12	(Egypt)	Salem, Islam	1.91 m (6 ft 3 in)	37 – 20 March 1989
PG	14	(Egypt)	Hatem, Ahmed	1.91 m (6 ft 3 in)	31 – 2 September 1995
SG	15	(Egypt)	Hesham, Omar	1.91 m (6 ft 3 in)	31 – 29 March 1995
F	23	(Egypt)	Yasser, Ahmed	1.98 m (6 ft 6 in)	25 – 18 June 2001
PF	24	(Nigeria)	Fakuade, Michael (I)	2.01 m (6 ft 7 in)	37 – 18 February 1989
F	41	(Egypt)	El-Saharty, Haytham (C)	1.96 m (6 ft 5 in)	41 – 26 August 1985
C	42	(Nigeria)	Elonu, Chinemelu (I)	1.93 m (6 ft 4 in)	39 – 11 March 1987
F	44	(Egypt)	Meshaal, Mostafa	1.96 m (6 ft 5 in)	40 – 11 March 1986
PF	50	(Egypt)	Kejo, Mostafa	2.03 m (6 ft 8 in)	32 – 24 October 1994

Head coach

- (Spain) Augustí Julbe

Assistant coach(es)

- (Egypt) Samir Gouda
- (Egypt) Yaser Mohamed

Legend

- (C) Team captain
- (I) Import player
- Injured

- Roster
Updated: May 15, 2021

== Egyptian Basketball Super League ==
=== Super League promotion match ===
It is a match between two teams previously determined in a related league, the winner of the Super League plays to compete for the league championship, and the loser competes with seven other teams to avoid relegation.

- Home Match
- Saturday 16 January 2021

Team 1	Score	Team 2
Zamalek (Egypt)	108-55	(Egypt) Al Zohour

- Away Match
- Tuesday 19 January 2021

Team 1	Score	Team 2
Al Zohour (Egypt)	Play suspended	(Egypt) Zamalek

=== Regular season ===
==== Top Group ====
Pos	Team	Pld	W	L	PF	PA	PD	Pts	Qualification
1	Al Ittihad	14	12	2	1217	1036	+181	24	Advance to playoffs
2	Zamalek	14	11	3	1065	988	+77	22	Advance to playoffs
3	Gezira	14	10	4	1096	1303	−207	20	Advance to playoffs
4	Al Ahly	14	8	6	1080	1009	+71	16	Advance to playoffs

Source: Goalzz.com

==== Matches ====
===== First round =====
- Day 1
- Saturday 30 January 2021

Team 1	Score	Team 2
Smouha (Egypt)	79-87	(Egypt) Zamalek

- Mostafa Kejo (25 Points)
- Walter Hodge (22 Points)
- Anas Osama (16 Points)
- Islam Salem (15 Points)
- Day 2
- Tuesday 2 February 2021

Team 1	Score	Team 2
Zamalek (Egypt)	87-86	(Egypt) Al Ittihad

- Day 3
- Monday 1 March 2021

Team 1	Score	Team 2
Zamalek (Egypt)	90-79	(Egypt) Al Geish Army

- Day 4
- Friday 5 March 2021

Team 1	Score	Team 2
Al Ahly (Egypt)	112-106	(Egypt) Zamalek

- Day 5
- Monday 8 March 2021

Team 1	Score	Team 2
Zamalek (Egypt)	65-57	(Egypt) Sporting Alexandria

- Day 6
- Friday 12 March 2021

Team 1	Score	Team 2
Etisalat (Egypt)	70-76	(Egypt) Zamalek

- Day 7
- Monday 15 March 2021

Team 1	Score	Team 2
Zamalek (Egypt)	79-72	(Egypt) Gezira

===== Second round =====
- Day 8
- Friday 19 March 2021

Team 1	Score	Team 2
Zamalek (Egypt)	85-83	(Egypt) Smouha

- Walter Hodge (34 Points)
- Mostafa Kejo (15 Points)
- Anas Osama (14 Points)
- Mohab Yasser (12 Points)
- Day 9
- Monday 22 March 2021

Team 1	Score	Team 2
Al Ittihad (Egypt)	83-74	(Egypt) Zamalek

- Day 10
- Friday 26 March 2021

Team 1	Score	Team 2
Al Geish Army (Egypt)	60-72	(Egypt) Zamalek

- Mostafa Kejo (26 Points)
- Anas Osama (16 Points)
- Mohab Yasser (15 Points)
- Walter Hodge (12 Points)
- Day 11
- Monday 29 March 2021

Team 1	Score	Team 2
Zamalek (Egypt)	Play suspended	(Egypt) Al Ahly

The match was calculated for Al-Ahly 20-0 after its objection to the attendance of fans of the Zamalek club, and according to the regulations of the Egyptian Federation, the presence of the fans is prohibited

- Day 12
- Friday 2 April 2021

Team 1	Score	Team 2
Sporting Alexandria (Egypt)	64-76	(Egypt) Zamalek

- Day 13
- Monday 5 April 2021

Team 1	Score	Team 2
Zamalek (Egypt)	91-62	(Egypt) Etisalat

- Day 14
- Thursday 8 April 2021

Team 1	Score	Team 2
Gezira (Egypt)	61-77	(Egypt) Zamalek

- Walter Hodge (23 Points)
- Mostafa Kejo (12 Points)
- Omar Hesham (12 Points)
- Islam Salem (8 Points)
- Anas Osama (6 Points)
- Mohab Yasser (6 Points)

=== Playoffs ===
The playoffs started on 16 April 2021.

==== Bracket ====
Quarter-finals
1	Al Ittihad	3
8	Al Geish Army	0
4	Al Ahly	3
5	Sporting Alexandria	1
2	Zamalek	3
7	Al Ittisalat	1
3	Gezira	3
6	Smouha	0

Semi-finals
1	Al Ittihad	3
4	Al Ahly	0
2	Zamalek	3
3	Gezira	0

Finals
1	Al Ittihad	2
2	Zamalek	3

==== Quarterfinals ====
Team 1	Series	Team 2	Game 1	Game 2	Game 3	Game 4
Zamalek	3–1	Al Ittisalat	76–47	92–59	66-77	83–58

==== Semi-finals ====
Team 1	Series	Team 2	Game 1	Game 2	Game 3
Zamalek	3–0	Gezira	85-83	73–71	86-81

- Top Score
- Walter Hodge (81 Points), (10 Rebounds), (18 Assists)
- Islam Salem (45 Points), (16 Rebounds), (3 Assists)
- Anas Osama (27 Points), (28 Rebounds), (11 Assists)
- Mohab Yasser (24 Points), (12 Rebounds), (7 Assists)
- Omar Hesham (20 Points), (6 Rebounds), (6 Assists)
- Mostafa Kejo (18 Points), (24 Rebounds), (4 Assists)
- mohammed mostafa hegazi (10 Points), (18 Rebounds), (6 Assists)

=== Finals ===
Team 1	Series	Team 2	Game 1	Game 2	Game 3	Game 4	Game 5
Al Ittihad	2-3	Zamalek	83-56	70-80	69-74	81-79	80-84

==== Game summaries ====
- Game 1

On Time Sports

Sunday, June 20
7:00pm

Recap

Zamalek 56, Al Ittihad 83
Scoring by quarter: 14–23, 14–15, 13–22, 15–23
Pts: Mostafa Kejo 13; Rebs: Mostafa Kejo 13; Asts: Omar Hesham 4	Pts: Rami Ibrahim 19; Rebs: Somaa 7 Asts: Somaa 4
Al Ittihad leads series, 1–0

Cairo, Dr Hassan Moustafa Sports Hall

- Game 2

On Time Sports

Tuesday, June 22
7:00pm

Recap

Zamalek 80, Al Ittihad 70
Scoring by quarter: 18-11, 24-19, 20-15, 18–25
Pts: Mohab Yasser 23; Rebs: Anas Osama 10; Asts: Anas Osama 7	Pts: Somaa 18; Rebs: Haytham Kamal 8 Asts: Marvelle Harris 7
Zamalek Tied series, 1–1

Cairo, Dr Hassan Moustafa Sports Hall

- Game 3

On Time Sports

Thursday, June 24
7:00pm

Recap

Zamalek 74, Al Ittihad 69
Scoring by quarter: 12-20, 22-8, 14-18, 24-23
Pts: Walter Hodge 28; Rebs: Anas Osama 11; Asts: Anas Osama 5	Pts: Marvelle Harris 22; Rebs: Somaa 5 Asts: Somaa 4
Zamalek Leads series, 2–1

Cairo, Dr Hassan Moustafa Sports Hall

- Game 4

On Time Sports

Saturday, June 26
7:00pm

Recap

Zamalek 79, Al Ittihad 81
Scoring by quarter: 20-19, 16–23, 24-20, 19-19
Pts: Walter Hodge 21; Rebs: Anas Osama 9 Asts: Anas Osama 8	Pts: Mido Taha 20; Rebs: Somaa 14; Asts: Somaa 3
Al Ittihad Tied series, 2-2

Cairo, Dr Hassan Moustafa Sports Hall

- Game 5

On Time Sports

Monday, June 28
7:00pm

Recap

Zamalek 84, Al Ittihad 80 (OT) (OT)
Scoring by quarter: 25-29, 23-13, 14-25, 21-16, Overtime: 11-7
Pts: Walter Hodge 21; Rebs: Anas Osama 13; Asts: Anas Osama 5	Pts: Haytham Kamal 22; Rebs: Somaa 9 Asts: Somaa 6
Zamalek wins the series, 3–2

Cairo, Dr Hassan Moustafa Sports Hall

==== Player statistics ====
Legend
GP	Games played	GS	Games started	MPG	Minutes per game
FG%	Field-goal percentage	3P%	3-point field-goal percentage	FT%	Free-throw percentage
RPG	Rebounds per game	APG	Assists per game	SPG	Steals per game
BPG	Blocks per game	PPG	Points per game

Zamalek Sc statistics
Player	GP	GS	MPG	FG%	3P%	FT%	RPG	APG	SPG	BPG	PPG
Walter Hodge	5	5	00.0	.000	.000	.000	1.6	3.4	1.4	0.0	19
Mohamed Mostafa	5	0	00.0	.000	.000	.000	3.8	0.2	0.8	0.0	2.8
Mohab Yasser	5	5	00.0	.000	.000	.000	4.6	1.2	1.8	0.2	12.2
Anas Osama Mahmoud	5	5	00.0	.000	.000	.000	10	5.4	1.2	1.6	6.4
Mostafa Kejoo	5	5	00.0	.000	.000	.000	7.6	0.8	0.6	0.0	10
Eslam Salem	5	5	00.0	.000	.000	.000	2.8	2.0	1.0	0.0	11.6
Omar Hesham	5	0	00.0	.000	.000	.000	2.8	2.0	0.2	0.0	2.6
Adham Essam	2	0	00.0	.000	.000	.000	0.0	0.0	0.0	0.0	0.0
Ahmed Hatem	5	0	00.0	.000	.000	.000	1.2	0.4	0.4	0.0	4.4
Ahmed Yasser	5	0	00.0	.000	.000	.000	1.6	0.0	0.6	0.2	4.4
Mostafa Meshaal	2	0	00.0	.000	.000	.000	1.5	1.0	0.0	0.0	3.0

== Basketball Africa League ==
=== Group phase ===
==== Standings ====
Pos	Team	Pld	W	L	PF	PA	PD	Pts	Qualification	ZAM	FVM	ASD	GSP
1	(Egypt) Zamalek	3	3	0	254	181	+73	6	Advance to playoffs	—	71–55	—	97–64
2	(Mozambique) Ferroviário de Maputo	3	2	1	229	218	+11	5	Advance to playoffs	—	—	88–74	—
3	(Senegal) AS Douanes	3	1	2	230	250	−20	4	Advance to playoffs	62–86	—	—	94–76
4	(Algeria) GS Pétroliers	3	0	3	213	277	−64	3		—	73–86	—	—

Source: BAL
Legend: Blue = home team win; Red = away team win.

==== Games ====
17 May 2021	Zamalek (Egypt)	71–55	(Mozambique) Ferroviário de Maputo	Kigali
15:30 GMT	Scoring by quarter: 16–13, 18–20, 15–9, 22–13
	Pts: Hodge 17; Rebs: Mahmoud 10; Asts: Hodge 6	Boxscore	Pts: Masa 24; Rebs: Masa 11; Asts: Three players 2	Arena: Kigali Arena; Attendance: 607

23 May 2021	AS Douanes (Senegal)	62–86	(Egypt) Zamalek	Kigali
15:30 GMT	Scoring by quarter: 14–20, 19–24, 14–25, 15–17
	Pts: Diop 14; Rebs: Diop 9 Asts: Ndour 6	Boxscore	Pts: Abdallatif 14; Rebs: Elonu 8 Asts: Diabate 6	Arena: Kigali Arena

24 May 2021^{[Note 1]}	Zamalek (Egypt)	97–64	(Algeria) GS Pétroliers	Kigali
19:00 GMT	Scoring by quarter: 37–16, 17–11, 14–24, 29–13
	Pts: Elmekawi 19; Rebs: Elmekawi 11; Asts: Mahmoud 7	Boxscore	Pts: Touati 20; Rebs: Touati 7 Asts: Bourkaib 7	Arena: Kigali Arena; Attendance: 386

=== Playoffs ===
==== Quarterfinals ====
26 May 2021	Zamalek (Egypt)	82–53	(Cameroon) FAP	Kigali
15:30 GMT	Scoring by quarter: 12–16, 18–12, 25–14, 27–11
	Pts: Hodge 18; Rebs: Three players 8 Asts: Hodge 6	Boxscore	Pts: Harouna 21; Rebs: Nkene & Hezekiah 8 Asts: Thomas Jr. 3	Arena: Kigali Arena; Attendance: 514

==== Semifinals ====
29 May 2021	Zamalek (Egypt)	89–71	(Angola) Petro de Luanda	Kigali
13:00 GMT	Scoring by quarter: 24–24, 31–15, 17–13, 17–19
	Pts: Hodge 19; Rebs: Mahmoud 7 Asts: Hodge 10	Boxscore	Pts: Morais 18; Rebs: Pedro 9 Asts: Dundão & Gonçalves 3	Arena: Kigali Arena; Attendance: 704

==== Finals ====
30 May 2021	US Monastir (Tunisia)	63–76	(Egypt) Zamalek	Kigali
14:00 GMT	Scoring by quarter: 22–17, 20–27, 9–11, 12–21
	Pts: Ben Romdhane & Crawford 14; Rebs: Ben Romdhane 10; Asts: Abada 5 PIR: Three players 12	Report	Pts: Fakuade 15; Rebs: Elonu 12; Asts: Diabate 6 PIR: Elonu 22	Arena: Kigali Arena; Attendance: 1,789; Referees: Samir Abaakil (Morocco), Marie Leslie Cherubin (Mauritius), Kingsley Ojeaburu (Nigeria)
