= 2021–22 Zamalek SC (basketball) season =

Zamalek
2021-22 season
- President: (Egypt) Hussein Labib (Interim)
- Head coach: (Greece) Vangelis Angelou
- Arena: The Covered Hall Abdulrahman Fawzi Hall
- Egyptian Basketball Super League: Semifinalist (eliminated by Al Ittihad)
- Egypt Cup: Third place
- BAL: Third place
Home	Away

2021–22 Zamalek SC is a season for Egyptian Basketball Super League, in which Zamalek competes for all tournaments, starting with the Egyptian Super Cup as the holder of the Super League title, and Basketball Africa League, along with the Super League for Basketball, the Associated League and the Egypt Basketball Cup

== Rosters ==
=== Super League roster ===
The following was Zamalek's roster for the Egyptian Super League, including youth players.

Zamalek roster
Players
Coaches

Pos.	No.	Nat.	Name	Ht.	Age
F	00	(Egypt)	Abdelwahab, Ahmed	1.98 m (6 ft 6 in)	25 – 18 June 2001
SG	4	(Egypt)	Hesham, Omar	1.91 m (6 ft 3 in)	31 – 29 March 1995
PG	6	(Egypt)	Hatem, Ahmed	1.91 m (6 ft 3 in)	31 – 2 September 1995
PG	7	(Egypt)	Essam, Adham
PG	8	(Dominican Republic)	Sosa, Édgar	1.88 m (6 ft 2 in)	38 – 15 January 1988
SG	9	(Egypt)	Salem, Eslam	1.91 m (6 ft 3 in)	37 – 20 March 1989
PF	10	(Egypt)	Osama Mahmoud, Anas	2.13 m (7 ft 0 in)	31 – 9 May 1995
F	11	(Egypt)	Osama Mahmoud, Ahmed	2.01 m (6 ft 7 in)
C	14	(Egypt)	Kejo, Mostafa (C)	2.03 m (6 ft 8 in)	31 – 24 October 1994
C	17	(Egypt)	Hegazy, Mohammed
SG	21	(Egypt)	Ayman, Moaaz	1.92 m (6 ft 4 in)	26 – 29 February 2000
PG	22	(Egypt)	Elessawy, Sleem	1.78 m (5 ft 10 in)	23 – 28 September 2002
PF	35	(Egypt)	Nedal, Ahmed	1.95 m (6 ft 5 in)	20 – 3 May 2006
F	41	(Egypt)	Assem, Ahmed	1.98 m (6 ft 6 in)	25 – 1 January 2001
C	55	(Egypt)	Elmashad, Hazem	2.06 m (6 ft 9 in)	27 – 22 February 1999

Head coach

- (Greece) Will Voigt

Legend

- (C) Team captain
- (I) Import player
- Injured

- Roster
Updated: April 7, 2022

=== BAL roster ===
The following was Zamalek's 13-man roster for the 2022 BAL season.

Zamalek roster
Players
Coaches

Pos.	No.	Nat.	Name	Ht.	Age
PG	00	(Egypt)	Essam, Adham	1.88 m (6 ft 2 in)	34 – 25 November 1991
G	1	(Egypt)	Azab Faraq, Ahmed	1.81 m (5 ft 11 in)	31 – 21 February 1995
G	2	(Cameroon)	Strawberry, D. J. (I)	1.98 m (6 ft 6 in)	41 – 15 June 1985
SG	4	(Egypt)	Hesham, Omar	1.91 m (6 ft 3 in)	31 – 29 March 1995
PG	5	(Dominican Republic)	Sosa, Édgar (I)	1.88 m (6 ft 2 in)	38 – 15 January 1988
PF/C	6	(Nigeria)	Diogu, Ike (I)	2.06 m (6 ft 9 in)	43 – 11 September 1983
PF	10	(Egypt)	Mahmoud, Anas	2.13 m (7 ft 0 in)	31 – 9 May 1995
PG	11	(United States)	McKinney, Mikh (I)	1.85 m (6 ft 1 in)	34 – 26 January 1992
SG	12	(Egypt)	Salem, Eslam	1.91 m (6 ft 3 in)	37 – 20 March 1989
G	14	(Senegal)	Rassoul Mboup, Khadim (E)	2.01 m (6 ft 7 in)	20 – 14 September 2006
F	23	(Egypt)	Yasser, Ahmed	2.01 m (6 ft 7 in)	25 – 18 June 2001
C	28	(Egypt)	Elmashad, Hazem	2.06 m (6 ft 9 in)	27 – 22 February 1999
C	41	(Egypt)	Kejo, Mostafa (C)	2.03 m (6 ft 8 in)	31 – 24 October 1994

Head coach

- (United States) Will Voigt

Legend

- (C) Team captain
- (I) Import player
- (E): BAL Elevate program player
- Injured

- Roster
Updated: April 9, 2022

=== Depth chart ===
Pos.	Starting 5	Bench 1	Bench 2	Inactive
C	Mostafa Kejo	Hazem Elmashad	Mohammed Hegazy	Mohammed Hegazy (injured)
PF	Anas Osama Mahmoud	Aly Hegazy	Ahmed Assem	Anas Osama Mahmoud (injured)
SF	Eslam Salem	Ahmed Abdelwahab	Ahmed Osama Mahmoud	Eslam Salem (injured)
SG	Édgar Sosa	Omar Hesham	Moaaz Ayman
PG	Ahmed Hatem	Adham Essam	Sleem Elessawy

=== Transactions ===
==== In ====
No.	Pos.	Nat.	Name	Age	Moving from		Type	Ends	Transfer fee	Date	Source
8	PG	(Dominican Republic)	Édgar Sosa	38	Rasta Vechta	(Germany)	Transfer	June 2022	Free	2 September 2021	
22	PG	(Egypt)	Sleem Elessawy	23	Sporting	(Egypt)	Transfer	June 2022	Free	28 July 2021	
11	SF	(Egypt)	Ahmed Osama Mahmoud				Transfer	June 2023	Free	28 July 2021	
41	PF	(Egypt)	Ahmed Assem	25	Gezira	(Egypt)	Transfer	June 2025	Free	28 July 2021	
	PF/C	(Nigeria)	Ike Diogu	43	Chemidor	(Iran)	Free Agent	2022	Free	16 January 2022	
	PG	(Tunisia)	Omar Abada	33	Al-Ittihad Jeddah	(Saudi Arabia)	Free Agent	2022	Free	16 January 2022	
	G	(United States)	Tony Wroten	33	Élan Béarnais	(France)	Free Agent	2022	Free	16 January 2022	
	CG	(United States)	Dewarick Spencer	44			Free Agent	2022	Free	16 January 2022	
	SG	(Egypt)	Mohab Yasser	4	East Tennessee State Buccaneers	(United States)	End of season	Free	9 May 2022		

==== Out ====
No.	Pos.	Nat.	Name	Age	Moving to		Type	Transfer fee	Date	Source
41	SF	(Egypt)	Haytham El-Saharty	41			Retirement		20 September 2021	
44	F/C	(Egypt)	Mostafa Meshaal	40	Free agent		End of contract	Free	20 September 2021	
	F/C	(Egypt)	Kariem Eldahshan		Egypt Insurance	(Egypt)	End of contract	Free	20 September 2021	
2	SG	(Egypt)	Mohab Yasser	24	East Tennessee State	(United States)		Free	10 June 2021	
0	PG	(Dominican Republic)	Walter Hodge	40	Capitanes de Arecibo	(Dominican Republic)	End of contract	Free	10 June 2021	

== Competitions ==
=== Overview ===
Competition	First match	Last match	Starting round	Final position	Record							
Competition	First match	Last match	Starting round	Final position	Pld	W	D	L	PF	PA	PD	Win %
Mortabt-League	14 October 2021	20 November 2021	Round 1	5th	14	9	0	5	1,017	1,000	+17	64.29
Super-League	26 November 2021	TBC	Best of 3	TBC	9	3		6	632	637	−5	33.33
Super-Cup	1 November 2021	1 November 2021	final	Runner-Up	1			1	46	92	−46	0.00
Cup	23 November 2021		R 1/16	TBC	1	1			78	66	+12	100.00
Total					25	13	0	12	1,773	1,795	−22	52.00

Source: Competitions

=== Elmortabt League ===
==== Results summary ====
Overall						Home					Away				
Pld	W	L	PF	PA	PD	W	L	PF	PA	PD	W	L	PF	PA	PD
14	9	5	1000	976	+24	5	2	541	476	+65	4	3	459	500	−41

Last updated: 21 November 2021.
Source: Competitive matches

==== Group ====
Pos	Team	Pld	W	L	PF	PA	PD	Pts	Qualification
1	Egypt Insurance	6	6	0	441	380	+61	12	Advance to playoffs
2	Zamalek	6	4	2	451	423	+28	8	Advance to playoffs
3	Al Geish Army	6	2	4	410	417	−7	4	Advance to playoffs
4	Al Shams	6	0	6	351	433	−82	0	Advance to playoffs

- Matches

- Day (1)

14 Oct 2021	Zamalek (Egypt)	83–60	(Egypt) Al Shams	Cairo
20:00 CAT	Scoring by quarter: 20–14, 25–11, 17–19, 21–16
	Pts: Édgar Sosa 19; Rebs: Mostafa Kejo 8 Asts: Édgar Sosa 6			Arena: Abdulrahman Fawzi Hall

- Day (2)

15 Oct 2021	Egypt Insurance	78–62	(Egypt) Zamalek	Cairo
18:00 CAT	Scoring by quarter: 14–13, 22–13, 18–20, 22–16
			Pts: Édgar Sosa 24; Rebs: Mohammed Hegazy, Hazem Elmashad 6 Asts: Sleem Elessawy 3	Arena: The Arab Contractors Hall

- Day (3)

16 Oct 2021	Zamalek (Egypt)	89–83	(Egypt) Al Geish Army	Cairo
18:00 CAT	Scoring by quarter: 29–20, 20–17, 20–29, 20–17
	Pts: Édgar Sosa 30; Rebs: Hazem Elmashad 9 Asts: Édgar Sosa 9			Arena: Abdulrahman Fawzi Hall

- Day (4)

20 Oct 2021	Al Shams (Egypt)	69–76	(Egypt) Zamalek	Cairo
18:00 CAT	Scoring by half: 31–39, 38–37
			Pts: Mostafa Kejo 18; Rebs: Mostafa Kejo 9	Arena: Al Shams Hall

- Day (5)

21 Oct 2021	Zamalek (Egypt)	69–71	Egypt Insurance	Cairo
18:00 CAT	Scoring by quarter: 16–27, 16–19, 17–14, 20–11
	Pts: Mostafa Kejo 18; Rebs: Mostafa Kejo 12			Arena: Abdulrahman Fawzi Hall

- Day (6)

22 Oct 2021	Al Geish Army (Egypt)	62–72	(Egypt) Zamalek	Cairo
18:00 CAT	Scoring by half: 35–43, 27–29
			Pts: Hazem Elmashad 18; Rebs: Hazem Elmashad 11	Arena: Tala'ea El Gaish Hall

==== Playoffs ====
- Bracket

Round of 16
A2	Zamalek	2
B3	Heliopolis	0
C1	Smouha	2
D4	Tanta	9
B1	Al Ittihad	2
A4	Al Shams	0
D2	Sporting	2
C3	Ashab Aljead	0
A1	Egypt Insurance	1
B4	Olympi	1
C2	Gezira	2
D4	El Tayaran	0
B2	Etisalat	1
A3	Al Geish Army	1
D1	Al Ahly	2
C4	Al Qana	0

Quarter-finals
A2	Zamalek	0
C1	Smouha	2
B1	Al Ittihad	2
D2	Sporting	0
A1	Egypt Insurance	0
C2	Gezira	2
B2	Etisalat	0
D1	Al Ahly	2

Semi-finals
C1	Smouha
B1	Al Ittihad
C2	Gezira
D1	Al Ahly

Finals

- Although the Egypt Insurance and Olympi teams tied in the number of wins, the victory of the (U18) team to the Egypt Insurance Club favored the team to rise.
- Although the Etisalat and Al Geish Army teams tied in the number of wins, the victory of the (U18) team to the Etisalat Club favored the team to rise.
- Matches
- Round 1/16

26 Oct 2021 Home	Zamalek (Egypt)	77–59	(Egypt) Heliopolis	Cairo
18:00 CAT	Scoring by half: 43–30, 34–29
				Arena: Abdulrahman Fawzi Hall

29 Oct 2021 Away	Heliopolis (Egypt)	66–73	(Egypt) Zamalek	Cairo
19:00 CAT	Scoring by quarter: 14–10, 12–25, 15–21, 25–17
				Arena: Heliopolis Hall

- Quarter-finals

5 Nov 2021 Home	Zamalek (Egypt)	64–71	(Egypt) Smouha	Cairo
18:00 CAT	Scoring by quarter: 18-16, 18-14, 17-20, 11-21
				Arena: Abdulrahman Fawzi Hall

8 Nov 2021 Away	Smouha (Egypt)	82–79	(Egypt) Zamalek	Alexandria
18:00 CAT	Scoring by half: 42-29, 40-50
				Arena: Smouha Hall

- Positions from 5 to 8
- After the loss of Zamalek in the quarter-finals, Zamalek competed for places from 5 to 8
- Bracket

Positions from 5 to 8
A2	Zamalek	2
D2	Sporting	0
A1	Egypt Insurance	1
B2	Etisalat	1

Positions 5-6
A2	Zamalek	1
A1	Egypt Insurance	1
Positions 7-8
D2	Sporting	1
B2	Etisalat	1

- 5-8 MATCH Although the Egypt Insurance and Etisalat teams tied in the number of wins, the victory of the (U18) team to the Egypt Insurance Club favored the team to rise.
- 5-6 MATCH Although the Zamalek and Egypt Insurance teams tied in the number of wins, the victory of the (U18) team to the Zamalek Club favored the team to rise.
- 6-7 MATCH Although the Sporting and Etisalat teams tied in the number of wins, the victory of the (U18) team to the Sporting Club favored the team to rise.
- Positions from 5 to 8

11 Nov 2021 Home	Zamalek (Egypt)	75–65	(Egypt) Sporting	Cairo
20:00 CAT	Scoring by quarter: 20-25, 10-13, 19-12, 26-15
				Arena: Abdulrahman Fawzi Hall

14 Nov 2021 Away	Sporting (Egypt)	62–68	(Egypt) Zamalek	Alexandria
18:00 CAT	Scoring by quarter: 11-15, 22-13, 14-14, 15-26
				Arena: Sporting Hall

==== Positions 5-6 ====
17 Nov 2021 Home	Egypt Insurance	81–65	(Egypt) Zamalek	Cairo
18:00 CAT	Scoring by quarter: 21-15, 21-9, 16-20, 23-21
				Arena: The Arab Contractors Hall

20 Nov 2021 Away	Zamalek (Egypt)	84–67	Egypt Insurance	Cairo
18:00 CAT	Scoring by quarter: 21-13, 20-15, 22-14, 21-25
				Arena: Abdulrahman Fawzi Hall

- Zamalek finished the league in fifth place out of 16

Rank	Player
4	Zamalek
5	Egypt Insurance
6	Sporting
7	Etisalat

=== Egyptian Basketball Super Cup ===
- The Egyptian Basketball Super Cup, an annual tournament held between the Egyptian Super League and Egypt Cup champions, enters Zamalek as the champion of the 2020–21 League, and Al Ittihad as the champion of the Egypt Cup.

*NOTS In objection from the Zamalek club's board of directors to the unfair decisions against the club, the club decided to enter the Super match with the list of players under twenty years old.

1 Nov 2021	Zamalek(U20) (Egypt)	46–92	(Egypt) Al Ittihad	Cairo
20:00 CAT
On Time Sports				Arena: Dr Hassan Moustafa Sports Hall

- Player statistics

Rank	Player	PTS	REB	ASS	STE	BLK	TO
1	Ali Hegazy (c)	15	10	1	2	0	2
2	Yassin Yasser	12	7	3	6	0	8
3	Ahmed Assem	5	5	1	0	0	3
4	Selim Elssawy	4	4	2	2	0	3

=== Bracket ===
Round of 16
Zamalek	78
Egypt Insurance	66
El Tayaran	58
Etisalat	83
Ashab Aljead	74
Gezira Elward	73
Al Ahly	86
Eltorram	47
Al Geish Army	64
Sporting	69
Gezira	82
Smouha	83
Al Shams
Al Qana
Heliopolis	54
Al Ittihad	84

Quarter-finals
Zamalek
Etisalat
Ashab Aljead
Al Ahly
Sporting
Smouha
Al Ittihad

Semi-finals

Finals

- Round 1/16

23 Nov 2021 Home	Egypt Insurance	66–78	(Egypt) Zamalek	Cairo
18:00 CAT	Scoring by quarter: 18-22, 12-10, 15-19, 21-27
				Arena: The Arab Contractors Hall

=== FIBA Intercontinental Cup ===
The 2022 FIBA Intercontinental Cup was the 31st edition of the FIBA Intercontinental Cup. The tournament was held in February 2022. The competition will be played in the Hassan Moustafa Sports Hall in Cairo, which marks the first time ever the Intercontinental Cup is played in Africa. In September 2021, the Egyptian Basketball Federation announced that Zamalek, as the defending BAL champions, would play in the FIBA Intercontinental Cup. It was the first time an African team played in the competition. On 19 November 2021, FIBA officially announced the four competing teams.

11 February 2022	Zamalek (Egypt)	61–78	(Spain) San Pablo Burgos	Cairo
20:00 (UTC+2)	Scoring by quarter: 16−23, 18−21, 13−19, 14−15
	Pts: McKinney 15; Rebs: Mahmoud 11; Asts: McKinney 4	Boxscore	Pts: Eddie 17; Rebs: Nnoko 10; Asts: Renfroe 6	Arena: Hassan Moustafa Sports Hall; Referees: Roberto Vázquez (PUR), Rabah Noujaim (LBN), Wojciech Liszka (POL)

13 February 2022	Zamalek (Egypt)	78–113	(United States) Lakeland Magic	Cairo
17:00 (UTC+2)	Scoring by quarter: 21−30, 22−33, 14−20, 21−30
	Pts: Sosa 18; Rebs: Diogu 15; Asts: Mahmoud 5	Boxscore	Pts: Gravett 22; Rebs: Teske 7 Asts: Dowtin 11	Arena: Hassan Moustafa Sports Hall; Referees: Yohan Rosso (FRA), Danniel García (VEN), Yevgeniy Mikheyev (KAZ)

=== Egyptian Basketball Super League ===
- System
- |Egyptian Basketball Super League is the basic and qualifying league for the BAL Championship. The league consists of three stages:
- (1)The preliminary stage: where 1 meets 16, 2 meets 15, and so on in terms of ranking in the Mortabt-League.
- (2)The regular league: After the rise of eight teams compete among themselves In back and forth matches.
- (3)Playoffs stage: It starts from the final round, where the 1st place holder of the regular league meets the 8th place holder in a series of three matches, then the semi-finals and the final is a series of 5 matches.

==== The preliminary stage ====
- Zamalek finished fifth in the league associated with it, and it will meet the 12th place holder, the Olympi, in a series of three matches, to ascend the first to win the

26 NOV 2021 Home	Zamalek (Egypt)	80–62	(Egypt) Olympi	Cairo
18:00 CAT	Scoring by quarter: 24-10, 19-16, 22-15, 15-21
				Arena: Abdulrahman Fawzi Hall

29 NOV 2021 Away	Olympi (Egypt)	56–74	(Egypt) Zamalek	Alexandria
16:00 CAT	Scoring by quarter: 8-22, 23-23, 12-18, 11-9
				Arena: Al Olympi Hall

==== Regular season ====
Pos	Team	Pld	W	L	PF	PA	PD	Pts	Qualification
1	Zamalek	0	0	0	0	0	0	0	Advance to playoffs

Source: goalzz.com
- Matches

10 Dec 2021 Rround 1	Gezira (Egypt)	56–70	(Egypt) Zamalek	Cairo
16:00 CAT
				Arena: Cairo Stadium Indoor Halls Complex

13 Dec 2021 Rround 2	Zamalek (Egypt)	65–80	(Egypt) Al Ittihad	Cairo
18:00 CAT
				Arena: Abdulrahman Fawzi Hall

17 Dec 2021 Rround 3	Zamalek (Egypt)	70–78	(Egypt) Al Ittisalat	Cairo
18:00 CAT
				Arena: Abdulrahman Fawzi Hall

20 Dec 2021 Rround 4	Al Ahly (Egypt)	71–64	(Egypt) Zamalek	Cairo
16:00 CAT
				Arena: Al Ahly Sports Hall

24 Dec 2021 Rround 5	Zamalek (Egypt)	72–74	(Egypt) Smouha	Cairo
18:00 CAT
				Arena: Abdulrahman Fawzi Hall

27 Dec 2021 Rround 6	Sporting Alexandria (Egypt)	74–71	(Egypt) Zamalek	Alexandria
16:00 CAT
				Arena: Sporting Club Hall

30 Dec 2021 Rround 7	Zamalek (Egypt)	80–62	Egypt Insurance	Cairo
18:00 CAT
				Arena: Abdulrahman Fawzi Hall

8 Jan 2022 Rround 8	Zamalek (Egypt)	vs.	(Egypt) Gezira	Cairo
16:00 CAT
				Arena: Abdulrahman Fawzi Hall

11 Jan 2022 Rround 9	Al Ittihad (Egypt)	vs.	(Egypt) Zamalek	Alexandria
18:00 CAT
				Arena: Kamal Shalaby Hall

14 Jan 2022 Rround 10	Al Ittisalat (Egypt)	vs.	(Egypt) Zamalek	Cairo
18:00 CAT

17 Jan 2022 Rround 11	Zamalek (Egypt)	vs.	(Egypt) Al Ahly	Cairo
16:00 CAT
				Arena: Abdulrahman Fawzi Hall

21 Jan 2022 Rround 12	Smouha (Egypt)	vs.	(Egypt) Zamalek	Alexandria
18:00 CAT
				Arena: Smouha hall

24 Jan 2022 Rround 13	Zamalek (Egypt)	vs.	(Egypt) Sporting Alexandria	Cairo
16:00 CAT
				Arena: Abdulrahman Fawzi Hall

28 Jan 2022 Rround 14	Egypt Insurance	vs.	(Egypt) Zamalek	Cairo
18:00 CAT
				Arena: The Arab Contractors Hall

=== Playoffs ===
Quarterfinals

March 19, 2022	Zamalek SC	67–80 (Series: Al Ittisalat leads 1–0)	Al Ittisalat	Cairo

March 21, 2022	Zamalek SC	85–84 (Series: tied 1–1)	Al Ittisalat	Cairo

March 26, 2022	Al Ittisalat	73–75 (Series: Zamalek leads 2–1)	Zamalek SC	Abdulrahman Fawzi Hall

March 28, 2022	Al Ittisalat	67–71 (Series: Zamalek wins 3–1)	Zamalek SC	Abdulrahman Fawzi Hall

Semifinals

April 22, 2022	Zamalek	53–97 (Series: Al Ittihad Alexandria leads 1–0)	Al Ittihad Alexandria	Kamal Shalaby Hall

April 24, 2022	Zamalek	68–73 (Series: Al Ittihad Alexandria leads 2–0)	Al Ittihad Alexandria	Kamal Shalaby Hall

April 26, 2022	Zamalek	59–79 (Series: Al Ittihad Alexandria wins 3–0)	Al Ittihad Alexandria	Abdulrahman Fawzi Hall

== Basketball Africa League ==
=== Group phase ===
==== Standings ====
Pos	Team	Pld	W	L	PF	PA	PD	PCT	Qualification
1	(Egypt) Zamalek (H)	5	5	0	444	367	+77	1.000	Advance to playoffs
2	(Angola) Petro de Luanda	5	4	1	421	326	+95	.800	Advance to playoffs
3	(South Africa) Cape Town Tigers	5	2	3	386	436	−50	.400 (Note: Head-to-head: Cape Town Tigers 73–70 FAP on 13 April 2022.)	Advance to playoffs
4	(Cameroon) FAP	5	2	3	341	347	−6	.400	Advance to playoffs
5	(South Sudan) Cobra Sport	5	1	4	370	408	−38	.200 (Note: Head-to-head: Cobra Sport 108–82 Espoir Fukash on 13 April 2022.)	
6	(Democratic Republic of the Congo) Espoir Fukash	5	1	4	394	472	−78	.200	

Source: BAL, Afrobasket
(H) Hosts

==== Games ====
Date Time, TV	Opponent	Result	Record	High points	High rebounds	High assists	High index	Arena (attendance) City
Group phase
April 9, 2022; 19:00	vs. (South Sudan) Cobra Sport	W 80–63; Boxscore	1–0	17 – Diogu	11 – Mahmoud	8 – Sosa	28 – Mahmoud	Hassan Moustafa Sports Hall (230); Cairo
April 12, 2022; 22:00	vs. (South Africa) Cape Town Tigers	W 101–77; Boxscore	2–0	25 – Sosa	11 – Mahmoud	5 – Mahmoud	29 – Mahmoud	Hassan Moustafa Sports Hall (250); Cairo
April 15, 2022; 22:00	vs. (Angola) Petro de Luanda	W 85–72; Boxscore	3–0	19 – Sosa	11 – Mahmoud	6 – Sosa	25 – Mahmoud	Hassan Moustafa Sports Hall (1,132); Cairo
April 16, 2022; 22:00	vs. (Democratic Republic of the Congo) Espoir Fukash	W 101–92; Boxscore	4–0	28 – McKinney	10 – Kejo	7 – McKinney	29 – McKinney	Hassan Moustafa Sports Hall (259); Cairo
April 19, 2022; 22:00	vs. (Cameroon) FAP	W 77–63; Boxscore	5–0	27 – Sosa	11 – Diogu	5 – Tied	29 – Mahmoud	Hassan Moustafa Sports Hall (865); Cairo
Playoffs
May 22, 2022; 13:30	vs. (Guinea) SLAC; Quarterfinals						Kigali Arena; Kigali	
(#) Tournament seedings in parentheses. All times are in Greenwich Mean Time (GMT).
