= 2021 BAL finals =

2021 BAL Final
- Official promotional material for the game
- Event: 2021 BAL season
US Monastir	Zamalek
(Tunisia)	(Egypt)
(5–0)	(5–0)
63	76
Head coach: Mounir Ben Slimane	Head coach: Augustí Julbe
	1	2	3	4	Total
US Monastir	22	20	9	12	63
Zamalek	17	27	11	21	76
- Date: 30 May 2021
- Venue: Kigali Arena, Kigali, Rwanda
- MVP: Walter Hodge
- Favorite: US Monastir (1.70 decimal odds)
- Referees: Samir Abaakil (Morocco); Marie Leslie Cherubin (Mauritius); Kingsley Ojeaburu (Nigeria)
- Attendance: 1,789

The 2021 BAL Finals was the championship game of the inaugural season of the Basketball Africa League (BAL). The final was played in the Kigali Arena in Kigali on 30 May 2021. The game was played between Egyptian club Zamalek and Tunisian club US Monastir.

Due to COVID-19 pandemic regulations, attendance in the arena was limited and 1,789 people were present. Zamalek defeated Tunisian side Monastir 76–63 to win its first BAL championship and second African championship, having won the 1992 continental title. As such, the team qualified for the 2021 FIBA Intercontinental Cup. Zamalek's Walter Hodge was named league MVP after the final.

== Teams ==
Team	Previous final appearances (bold indicates winners)
(Tunisia) US Monastir	None
(Egypt) Zamalek	None; 3 in FIBA Africa Basketball League (1975, 1976, **1992**)

== Venue ==
On 1 August 2019, the Kigali Arena, built and opened in 2019, was announced as host of the Final Four of the BAL tournament. The arena has a capacity for approximately 10,000 people and hosted the AfroBasket 2021 qualifiers and Rwandan National Basketball League before.

The format of the league was later changed and the entire season was eventually played in Kigali. Due to the COVID-19 pandemic, attendance was limited and all spectators had to follow social distancing rules.

Kigali	2021 BAL finals (Africa)
Kigali Arena	2021 BAL finals (Africa)
Capacity: 10,000	2021 BAL finals (Africa)

== Background ==
=== US Monastir ===
US Monastir won the Pro A in 2019, to qualify for the inaugural BAL season. The team has also won the championship in 2020 and won the 2020–21 season on 27 April 2021, after defeating rivals Ezzahra Sports in the finals. to achieve a total of 6 titles in the league. On April 12, 2021, the team signed Mounir Ben Slimane as its new head coach.

In 2014, Monastir made its debut in the FIBA Africa Club Championship, Africa's top continental league, for the first time. In 2017, the club ended at third place in the continental league.

The Monastir team featured seven players who were also members of the Tunisian national team. During the BAL, the team impressed in the group stage by beating all its opponents and being the only team to achieve more than 100 points in a single game as they beat GNBC of Madagascar by 113 to 66. They qualified as the first seed to the play-offs and were deemed as "favourites" for the title prior to the league start by ESPN.

=== Zamalek ===
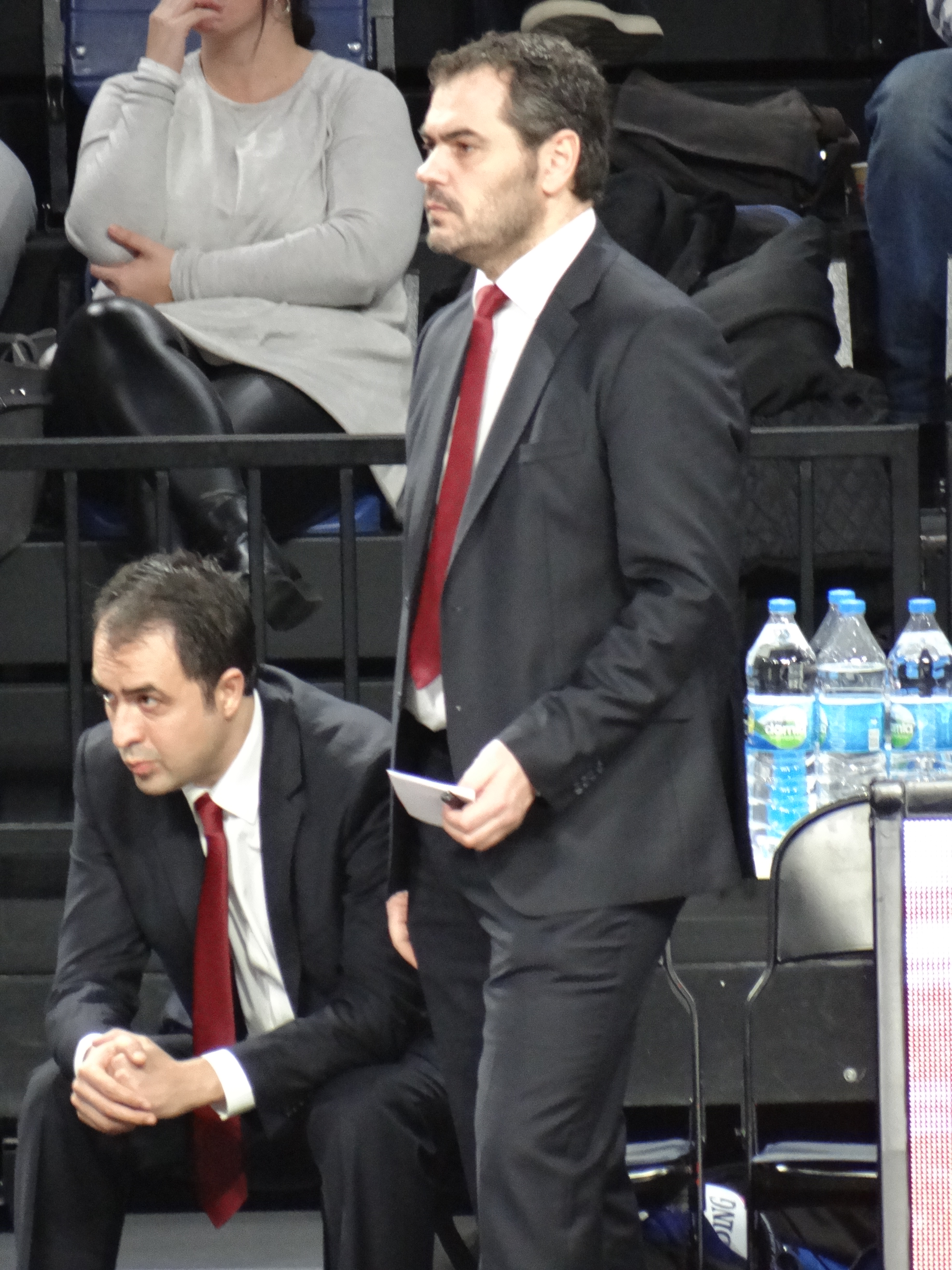
It was the first season as head coach for Augustí Julbe

Zamalek won the Egyptian Super League in 2019, its first title in 11 years, to qualify for the inaugural BAL season. In the 1990s, the club had been successful at the continental level as well with a FIBA Africa Basketball League title in 1992 and a lost final in 1998. Adding up appearances in the former FIBA competition, this was Zamalek's fifth continental final.

It was the first season under Spanish head coach Augustí Julbe, who arrived from Gran Canaria. At the moment of playing in the BAL, Zamalek was still active in the semifinals of the 2020–21 Egyptian League. Ahead of the season, the team strengthened itself with Michael Fakuade, Mouloukou Diabate and Chinemelu Elonu. The team played impressive in the group stage, beating all three opponents to go into the playoffs as the second seed.

== Road to the finals ==
(Tunisia) US Monastir		Round	(Egypt) Zamalek	
Opponent	Result	Group stage	Opponent	Result
(Madagascar) GNBC	113–66	Round 1	(Mozambique) Ferroviário de Maputo	71–55
(Nigeria) Rivers Hoopers	99–70	Round 2	(Senegal) AS Douanes	86–62
(Rwanda) Patriots	91–75	Round 3	(Algeria) GS Pétroliers	97–64
**Group A first place**: Pos / Team / Pld / Pts; **1** / (Tunisia) US Monastir / **3** / **6**; 2 / (Rwanda) Patriots (H) / 3 / **5**; 3 / (Nigeria) Rivers Hoopers / 3 / **4**; 4 / (Madagascar) GNBC / 3 / **3**; Source: BAL (H) Hosts		Regular season	**Group C first place**: Pos / Team / Pld / Pts; **1** / (Egypt) Zamalek / **3** / **6**; 2 / (Mozambique) Ferroviário de Maputo / 3 / **5**; 3 / (Senegal) AS Douanes / 3 / **4**; 4 / (Algeria) GS Pétroliers / 3 / **3**; Source: BAL	
Opponent	Result	Playoffs	Opponent	Result
(Senegal) AS Douanes	86–62	Quarterfinals	(Cameroon) FAP	82–53
(Rwanda) Patriots	87–64	Semifinals	(Angola) Petro de Luanda	89–71

== Game ==
While US Monastir was favored ahead of the game, Zamalek convincingly took the final game. Zamalek guard Mohab Yasser, the youngest player in the BAL season at 18 years old, contributed 14 points after shooting 6-for-8 from the field. The trio of Solo Diabate, Michael Fakuade and Chinemelu Elonu added 40 points off the bench. With eight minutes to play, Zamalek opened up a 15-point lead and cruised its way to their first BAL victory. Zamalek point guard Walter Hodge scored 12 points and recorded 4 assists and was given the inaugural BAL Most Valuable Player award. Hodge had played for US Monastir the previous season.

30 May 2021	US Monastir (Tunisia)	63–**76**	(Egypt) **Zamalek**	Kigali
16:00 CAT (14:00 GMT)	Scoring by quarter: 22–17, 20–27, 9–11, 12–21
	Pts: Ben Romdhane, Crawford 14; Rebs: Ben Romdhane 10; Asts: Abada 5 PIR: Three players 12	Report	Pts: Fakuade 15; Rebs: Elonu 12; Asts: Diabate 6 PIR: Elonu 22	Arena: Kigali Arena; Attendance: 1,789; Referees: Samir Abaakil (Morocco), Marie Leslie Cherubin (Mauritius), Kingsley Ojeaburu (Nigeria)

Starters:			Pts	Reb	Ast
PG	00	(Tunisia) Omar Abada	13	4	5
SG	5	(Tunisia) Mourad El Mabrouk	2	3	0
SF	15	(Tunisia) Radhouane Slimane	14	10	1
PF	24	(Tunisia) Makrem Ben Romdhane	1	4	5
C	21	(South Sudan) Ater Majok	3	6	0
Reserves:					
G	1	(Tunisia) Neji Jaziri	DNP		
G	2	(United States) Chris Crawford	14	3	1
G	10	(Lebanon) Wael Arakji	13	1	2
F	11	(Tunisia) Oussama Marnaoui	DNP		
G	22	(Tunisia) Eskander Bhouri	DNP		
F	23	(Tunisia) Firas Lahyani	0	0	0
C	32	(Tunisia) Mokhtar Ghyaza	2	5	1
Head coach:
(Tunisia Basketball Federation) Mounir Ben Slimane

**Monastir**	**Zamalek**

Monastir	Statistics	Zamalek
17/43 (39%)	2-pt field goals	24/38 (63%)
4/23 (17%)	3-pt field goals	7/24 (29%)
17/26 (65%)	Free throws	7/12 (58%)
15	Offensive rebounds	8
25	Defensive rebounds	32
40	Total rebounds	40
12	Assists	15
18	Turnovers	19
8	Steals	5
4	Blocks	5
17	Fouls	26

2021 BAL champions

**Zamalek**
1st BAL title; 2nd continental title

Starters:			Pts	Reb	Ast
PG	00	(United States Virgin Islands) Walter Hodge	12	1	4
SG	2	(Egypt) Mohab Yasser	14	3	2
SF	12	(Egypt) Eslam Salem	0	1	0
PF	10	(Egypt) Anas Mahmoud	5	6	2
C	50	(Egypt) Mostafa Kejo	0	3	0
Reserves:					
G	1	(Ivory Coast) Mouloukou Diabate	14	3	6
G	14	(Egypt) Ahmed Hatem	DNP		
G	15	(Egypt) Omar Hesham	5	2	0
F	23	(Egypt) Ahmed Abdelwahab	0	0	0
C	24	(Nigeria) Michael Fakuade	15	2	1
F	41	(Egypt) Haytham Elsaharty	DNP		
C	42	(Nigeria) Chinemelu Elonu	11	12	0
Head coach:
(Spanish Basketball Federation) Augustí Julbe
