= 2021 BAL group phase =

The 2021 BAL group phase began on 16 May 2021 and ended on 24 May 2021. A total of 12 teams competed in the group stage to decide the 8 places in the 2021 BAL Playoffs.

Initially, it was planned that in the regular season, twelve teams play in two Conferences with six teams each. Each team will play five games, one against each opponent, inside its conference. The top three teams from each conference advance to the Super 6. The games will be played in six arenas divided over the African continent. The regular season will start in March 2020.

The format was changed to a group phase as a result of the COVID-19 pandemic. In three groups of four each team plays the other one time and the first, second and best third-placed teams advance to the playoffs.

== Group A ==
Pos	Team	Pld	W	L	PF	PA	PD	Pts	Qualification	USM	PAT	RIV	GNB
1	(Tunisia) US Monastir	3	3	0	303	211	+92	6	Advance to playoffs	—	—	91–75	—
2	(Rwanda) Patriots (H)	3	2	1	236	223	+13	5	Advance to playoffs	—	—	83–60	78–72
3	(Nigeria) Rivers Hoopers	3	1	2	210	251	−41	4		70–99	—	—	—
4	(Madagascar) GNBC	3	0	3	207	271	−64	3		66–113	—	69–80	—

Source: BAL
(H) Hosts

16 May 2021	Patriots (Rwanda)	83–60	(Nigeria) Rivers Hoopers	Kigali
14:00 GMT	Scoring by quarter: 17–18, 26–16, 22–10, 18–16
	Pts: Costner 20; Rebs: Ibeh 11; Asts: Gasana 4	Boxscore	Pts: Sullivan 15; Rebs: Koko 8 Asts: Uzoh 5	Arena: Kigali Arena; Attendance: 2,000

17 May 2021	GNBC (Madagascar)	66–113	(Tunisia) US Monastir	Kigali
19:00 GMT	Scoring by quarter: 13–23, 19–25, 11–30, 23–25
	Pts: Randriamampionona 26; Rebs: Mandimbison 4 Asts: Razanamahenina 7	Boxscore	Pts: Ben Romdhane 23; Rebs: Ben Romdhane 10; Asts: Crawford 8	Arena: Kigali Arena; Attendance: 498

19 May 2021	Patriots (Rwanda)	78–72	(Madagascar) GNBC	Kigali
12:00 GMT	Scoring by quarter: 19-25, 23-19, 14-16, 22-12
	Pts: Costner 16; Rebs: Wamukota 11; Asts: Gasana 4	Boxscore	Pts: Razanamahenina 21; Rebs: Mory 9 Asts: Razanamahenina 6	Arena: Kigali Arena; Attendance: 1,022

20 May 2021	Rivers Hoopers (Nigeria)	70–99	(Tunisia) US Monastir	Kigali
15:30 GMT	Scoring by quarter: 12–24, 10–25, 25–21, 23–29
	Pts: Daniels 25; Rebs: Daniels 11; Asts: Uzoh 8	Boxscore	Pts: Slimane 23; Rebs: Ghayaza, Lahyani, Majok 6 Asts: Abada 6	Arena: Kigali Arena

22 May 2021	US Monastir (Tunisia)	91–75	(Rwanda) Patriots	Kigali
14:00 GMT	Scoring by quarter: 24-20, 22-24, 22-14, 23-17
	Pts: Arakji 28; Rebs: Ben Romdhane 10; Asts: Slimane 6	Boxscore	Pts: Gasana 22; Rebs: Costner 6 Asts: Gasana 8	Arena: Kigali Arena; Attendance: 1141

23 May 2021	GNBC (Madagascar)	69–80	(Nigeria) Rivers Hoopers	Kigali
12:00 GMT	Scoring by quarter: 18-18, 22-23, 19-18, 10-21
	Pts: Mandimbison 19; Rebs: Mandimbison 6 Asts: Razanamahenina 5		Pts: Sullivan 19; Rebs: Koko 12; Asts: Uzoh, Daniels, Balogun 3	Arena: Kigali Arena

== Group B ==
Pos	Team	Pld	W	L	PF	PA	PD	Pts	Qualification	PDL	ASS	FAP	POL
1	(Angola) Petro de Luanda	3	3	0	247	208	+39	6	Advance to playoffs	—	97–78	—	84–66
2	(Morocco) AS Salé	3	2	1	253	260	−7	5	Advance to playoffs	—	—	87–84	88–79
3	(Cameroon) FAP	3	1	2	235	218	+17	4	Advance to playoffs	64–66	—	—	87–65
4	(Mali) AS Police	3	0	3	210	259	−49	3			—	—	—

Source: BAL

18 May 2021	Petro de Luanda (Angola)	84–66	(Mali) AS Police	Kigali
15:30 GMT	Scoring by quarter: 29–9, 20–28, 21–8, 14–21
	Pts: Pedro 17; Rebs: Pedro 17; Asts: Dundão 5	Boxscore	Pts: Keita 19; Rebs: Thomas 6 Asts: Thomas 4	Arena: Kigali Arena

18 May 2021	AS Salé (Morocco)	87–84	(Cameroon) FAP	Kigali
19:00 GMT	Scoring by quarter: 25–22, 8–20, 26–20, 28–22
	Pts: Stoglin 28; Rebs: Jefferson 9 Asts: James 5	Boxscore	Pts: Harouna 23; Rebs: Thomas, Tsangue 7 Asts: Kome 5	Arena: Kigali Arena

20 May 2021	FAP (Cameroon)	64–66	(Angola) Petro de Luanda	Kigali
12:00 GMT	Scoring by quarter: 21–20, 11–22, 15–14, 17–10
	Pts: Harouna 17; Rebs: Harouna 6 Asts: Harouna 4	Boxscore	Pts: Scott 23; Rebs: Pedro, Morais 10; Asts: Three players 3	Arena: Kigali Arena

16 May 2021	AS Salé (Morocco)	88–79	(Mali) AS Police	Kigali
19:00 GMT	Scoring by quarter: 8–19, 16–16, 31–19, 33–25
	Pts: Stoglin 40; Rebs: Najah 12; Asts: El Mahsini 7	Boxscore	Pts: Nzeakor 33; Rebs: Thomas 13; Asts: Haidara 6	Arena: Kigali Arena

23 May 2021	FAP (Cameroon)	87–65	(Mali) AS Police	Kigali
15:30 GMT	Scoring by quarter: 26-11, 27-21, 13-21, 21-12
	Pts: Harouna 16; Rebs: Nkene Tsance 12; Asts: Kome 5	Boxscore	Pts: Thomas 22; Rebs: Thomas 17; Asts: Thomas 4	Arena: Kigali Arena

23 May 2021	Petro de Luanda (Angola)	97–78	(Morocco) AS Salé	Kigali
19:00 GMT	Scoring by quarter: 16-23, 32-23, 20-17, 29-15
	Pts: Richards 19; Rebs: Pedro 10; Asts: Scott 7	Boxscore	Pts: Stoglin 25; Rebs: James 12; Asts: El Mahsini 7	Arena: Kigali Arena

== Group C ==
Pos	Team	Pld	W	L	PF	PA	PD	Pts	Qualification	ZAM	FVM	ASD	GSP
1	(Egypt) Zamalek	3	3	0	254	181	+73	6	Advance to playoffs	—	71–55	—	97–64
2	(Mozambique) Ferroviário de Maputo	3	2	1	229	218	+11	5	Advance to playoffs	—	—	88–74	—
3	(Senegal) AS Douanes	3	1	2	230	250	−20	4	Advance to playoffs	62–86	—	—	94–76
4	(Algeria) GS Pétroliers	3	0	3	213	277	−64	3		—	73–86	—	—

Source: BAL

17 May 2021	AS Douanes (Senegal)	94–76	(Algeria) GS Pétroliers	Kigali
12:00 GMT	Scoring by quarter: 21–19, 20–15, 26–29, 27–13
	Pts: Diop 18; Rebs: Diop 9 Asts: Faye 7	Boxscore	Pts: Harat 28; Rebs: Harat 9 Asts: Belkhodja 6	Arena: Kigali Arena; Attendance: 403

17 May 2021	Zamalek (Egypt)	71–55	(Mozambique) Ferroviário de Maputo	Kigali
15:30 GMT	Scoring by quarter: 16–13, 18–20, 15–9, 22–13
	Pts: Hodge 17; Rebs: Mahmoud 10; Asts: Hodge 6	Boxscore	Pts: Masa 24; Rebs: Masa 11; Asts: Three players 2	Arena: Kigali Arena; Attendance: 607

19 May 2021	Ferroviário de Maputo (Mozambique)	88–74	(Senegal) AS Douanes	Kigali
15:30 GMT	Scoring by quarter: 21–12, 17–25, 24–19, 26–18
	Pts: Masa 26; Rebs: Baru 11; Asts: Kabongo 12	Boxscore	Pts: Faye 15; Rebs: Diallo 7 Asts: Faye 5	Arena: Kigali Arena; Attendance: 508

22 May 2021	GS Pétroliers (Algeria)	73–86	(Mozambique) Ferroviário de Maputo	Kigali
12:00 GMT	Scoring by quarter: 17–22, 18–25, 19–22, 19–17
	Pts: Hamdini 33; Rebs: Ghezzoul 7 Asts: Hamdini 4	Boxscore	Pts: Kabongo 18; Rebs: Muchate 12; Asts: Holland 9	Arena: Kigali Arena

23 May 2021	AS Douanes (Senegal)	62–86	(Egypt) Zamalek	Kigali
15:30 GMT	Scoring by quarter: 14–20, 19–24, 14–25, 15–17
	Pts: Diop 14; Rebs: Diop 9 Asts: Ndour 6	Boxscore	Pts: Abdallatif 14; Rebs: Elonu 8 Asts: Diabate 6	Arena: Kigali Arena

24 May 2021^{[Note 1]} ZML v GSP	Zamalek (Egypt)	97–64	(Algeria) GS Pétroliers	Kigali
19:00 GMT	Scoring by quarter: 37–16, 17–11, 14–24, 29–13
	Pts: Elmekawi 19; Rebs: Elmekawi 11; Asts: Mahmoud 7	Boxscore	Pts: Touati 20; Rebs: Touati 7 Asts: Bourkaib 7	Arena: Kigali Arena; Attendance: 386

== Ranking of third-placed teams ==
Pos	Grp	Team	Pld	W	L	PF	PA	PD	Pts	Qualification
1	B	(Cameroon) FAP	3	1	2	235	218	+17	4	Advance to playoffs
2	C	(Senegal) AS Douanes	3	1	2	230	250	−20	4	Advance to playoffs
3	A	(Nigeria) Rivers Hoopers	3	1	2	210	251	−41	4	

Source: BAL
