= Mounir Ben Slimane =

Tunisian basketball coach (born 1965)

Personal information
- Born: 24 October 1965 (age 61)
- Position: Head coach
- Coaching career: 1986–present

Career history

Coaching
- 2021: US Monastir
- 2023–present: United Arab Emirates

Mounir Ben Slimane (Arabic: منير بن سليمان; born 24 October 1965) is a Tunisian professional basketball coach. He was the head coach of the United Arab Emirates national basketball team, whom he coached the UAE at the 2009 FIBA Asia Championship in China. He also is the current technical director of the United Arab Emirates Basketball Association.

== Coaching career ==
Ben Slimane started his coaching career in 1986. On April 12, 2021, he signed with US Monastir in Tunisia. He guided the team to second place in the Basketball Africa League. Monastir lost to Zamalek in the 2021 BAL Finals. Ben Slimane was also an assistant for the Detroit Pistons in the 2022 NBA Summer League.

Starting from 2023, Ben Slimane also coached the United Arab Emirates national team.

== Head coaching record ==
=== BAL ===
Legend
Regular season	G	Games coached	W	Games won	L	Games lost	W–L %	Win–loss %
Playoffs	PG	Playoff games	PW	Playoff wins	PL	Playoff losses	PW–L %	Playoff win–loss %

Team	Year	G	W	L	W–L%	Finish	PG	PW	PL	PW–L%	Result
Monastir	2021	3	3	0	1.000	1st in Group A	3	1	2	.333	Lost in BAL Finals
