= Egyptian Basketball Premier League MVP Award =

The Egyptian Basketball Premier League Most Valuable Player Award (MVP) is an annual Egyptian Basketball Premier League award given since the 2018–19 season to the best player of a given season. It is usually given to a player on the championship team.

Ehab Amin is the only player to have won three MVP awards, in 2022, 2023 and 2025.

== Winners ==
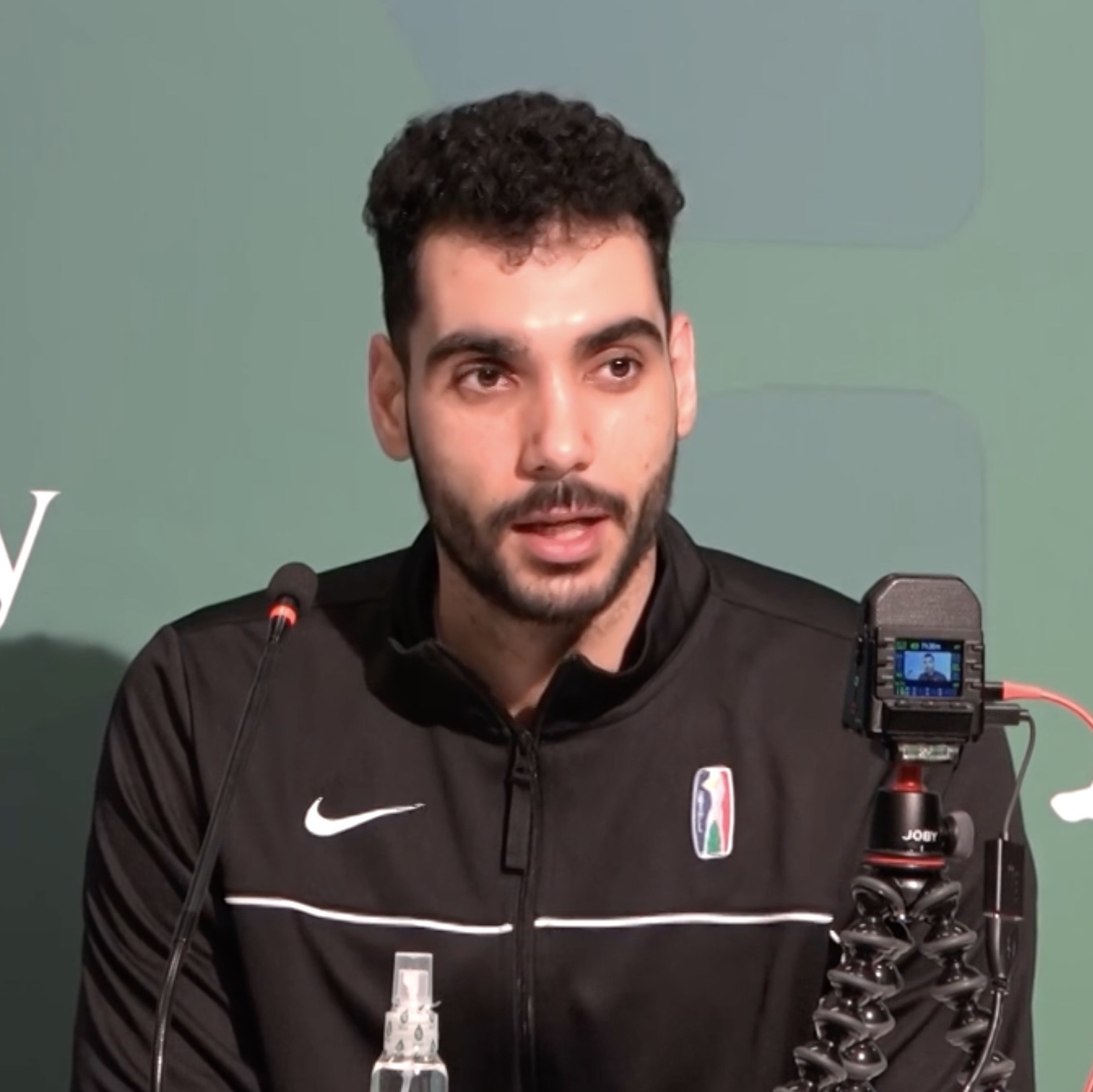
Ehab Amin has won three MVP awards; he won in 2022, 2023 and 2025

Season	Player	Position	Nationality	Club	Ref
2008–09	Wael Badr	Guard	Egypt	Zamalek	
2018–19	Terrell Stoglin	Point guard/shooting guard	United States	Zamalek	
2019–20	Ismail Ahmad	Forward/center	Egypt	Al Ittihad	
2020–21	Anas Mahmoud	Center	Egypt	Zamalek	
2021–22	Ehab Amin	Guard	Egypt	Al Ahly	
2022–23	Ehab Amin (2)	Guard	Egypt	Al Ahly	
2023–24	Ahmed Adel	Guard	Egypt	Al Ittihad Alexandria	
2024–25	Ehab Amin (3)	Guard	Egypt	Al Ahly	

== Players with most awards ==
Player	Editions	Notes
(Egypt) Ehab Amin	3	2022, 2023, 2025
