= Ahmed Hatem =

Ahmed Hatem may refer to:

- Ahmed Hatem (basketball)
- Ahmed Hatem (actor)
