= Mostafa Meshaal =

Mostafa Meshaal may refer to:

- Mostafa Meshaal (basketball)
- Mostafa Meshaal (footballer)
