= BAL Sportsmanship Award =

BAL Manute Bol Sportsmanship Award
- Sport: Basketball
- League: Basketball Africa League
- Awarded for: Given for exemplifying ideals of sportsmanship on the court with ethical behavior, fair play, and integrity.

History
- First award: 2021
- Most wins: Will Perry (2 awards)
- Most recent: Mohamed Sadi, Al Ahly Ly (2026)

The Basketball Africa League Manute Bol Sportsmanship Award is an annual Basketball Africa League (BAL) award given to the player "for exemplifying ideals of sportsmanship on the court with ethical behavior, fair play, and integrity". The award is named after South Sudanese basketball legend Manute Bol. The award was first handed out in the inaugural season to Makrem Ben Romdhane. Will Perry is the only player to have won the award twice (in 2023 and 2024).

== Winners ==
Season	Player	Position	Nationality	Club	Ref
2021	Makrem Ben Romdhane	Forward	Tunisia	(Tunisia) US Monastir	
2022	Anas Mahmoud	Center	Egypt	(Egypt) Zamalek	
2023	Will Perry	Guard	United States	(Mozambique) Ferroviário da Beira	
2024	Will Perry (2)	Guard	United States	(Nigeria) Rivers Hoopers	
2025	Solo Diabate	Guard	Ivory Coast	(Angola) Petro de Luanda	
2026	Mohamed Sadi	Guard	Libya	(Libya) Al Ahly Ly	
