= Samir Gouda =

Egyptian basketball player

Zamalek
- Title: Assistant coach
- League: Egyptian Basketball Super League; Basketball Africa League

Personal information
- Born: 3 May 1972 (age 54) Dakahlia, Egypt
- Listed height: 2.18 m (7 ft 2 in)
- Listed weight: 285 lb (129 kg)

Career information
- Playing career: 1994–2010
- Position: Center
- Number: 14
- Coaching career: 2020–present

Career history

Playing
- 1994–1995: Piratas de Quebradillas
- 1995–1996: Aris Thessaloniki
- 1996–1997: VAO
- 1997–1998: Iraklio
- 1998–1999: Peristeri
- 1999–2000: Al Riyadi Beirut
- 2000–2001: Zamalek
- 2001–2002: Apollon Limassol
- 2002–2003: Fenerbahçe
- 2003–2004: Apollon Limassol
- 2004–2005: Sagesse
- 2005–2006: Al-Ittihad Aleppo
- 2006–2007: Al Wasl
- 2007: Achilleas Kaimakli
- 2007–2008: Zamalek
- 2008–2010: Al Ahly

Coaching
- 2020–present: Zamalek (assistant)

Career highlights
- As player: Greek League All-Star (1997); As assistant coach: BAL champion (2021)
Medals
Men's basketball
Representing Egypt
FIBA AfroBasket
Bronze medal – third place	2001 Morocco
Bronze medal – third place	2003 Egypt

Samir Mahmoud Ahmed Gouda (born 3 May 1972) is an Egyptian-Ukrainian former professional basketball player and current coach. He currently serves as an assistant coach for Zamalek of the Egyptian Super League. During his playing career, at a height of 2.18 m (7 ft 2 in) tall, and a weight of 129 kg (285 lbs.) Gouda played at the center position. As a player, Gouda represented his country's national team, as he was a member of the senior Egyptian national team.

== Professional career ==
Gouda started his pro club career in 1994, with the Piratas de Quebradillas, in Puerto Rico's Baloncesto Superior Nacional (BSN) league. In 1995, he moved to Greece to play, and he would go on to spend four seasons playing there, with four different teams. In 1999, Gouda joined the Lebanese League club Al Riyadi Beirut, and he joined the Egyptian club Zamalek, in 2000.

In 2003, Gouda signed with the Turkish Super League club Fenerbahçe. Gouda finished his pro club playing career back in Egypt, with Al Ahly, in 2010.

== National team career ==
Gouda played with the senior men's Egyptian national team at the 1994 FIBA World Championship. He tied a tournament record for the most rebounds in a game, with 16 rebounds, in a 76–69 win over Canada. Gouda also won bronze medals with Egypt at the 2001 FIBA Africa Championship and the 2003 FIBA Africa Championship.
