= Anas Mahmoud =

Egyptian basketball player (born 1995)

Anas Mahmoud أنس أسامة محمود
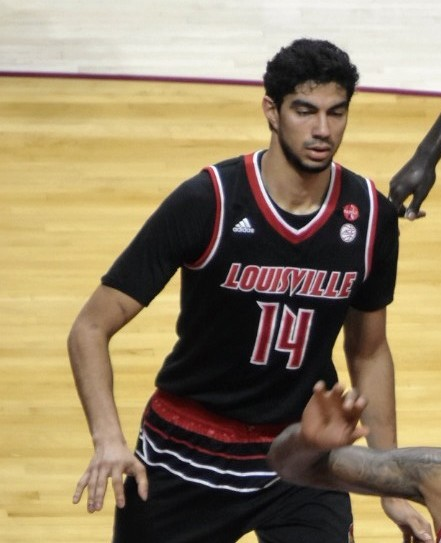
- Mahmoud playing for Louisville

No. 10 – Al Ittihad Alexandria
- Position: Center
- League: Egyptian Basketball Super League

Personal information
- Born: May 9, 1995 (age 30) Giza, Egypt
- Listed height: 7 ft 0 in (2.13 m)
- Listed weight: 210 lb (95 kg)

Career information
- High school: West Oaks Academy (Orlando, Florida)
- College: Louisville (2014–2018)
- NBA draft: 2018: undrafted
- Playing career: 2018–present

Career history
- 2018–2022: Zamalek
- 2022–present: Al Ittihad Alexandria
- 2023: Al Ahly Tripoli

Career highlights
- BAL champion (2021); All-BAL First Team (2021); BAL Defensive Player of the Year (2021); BAL Sportsmanship Award (2022); BAL blocks leader (2021); Egyptian League MVP (2021); 3× Egyptian League champion (2019, 2021, 2024); Egyptian Cup winner (2024); Egyptian Cup MVP (2024); ACC All-Defensive Team (2018)

Anas Osama Mahmoud (Arabic: أنس أسامة محمود; born May 9, 1995) is an Egyptian professional basketball player who plays for Al Ittihad Alexandria of the Egyptian Basketball Super League. He played college basketball at the University of Louisville. He represents the Egypt national basketball team.

== High school career ==
Mahmoud attended West Oaks Academy in Orlando, Florida for his senior year of high school. After garnering interest from college programs such as Cincinnati, Minnesota, Georgia Tech, and Louisville, Mahmoud signed a letter of intent to play and study at the University of Louisville on April 22, 2014.

College recruiting information
| Name | Hometown | School | Height | Weight | Commit date |
|---|---|---|---|---|---|
| Anas Mahmoud; C | Giza, Egypt | West Oaks Academy | 7 ft 0 in (2.13 m) | 200 lb (91 kg) | Mar 4, 2014 |
| Anas Mahmoud; C | Recruit ratings: Scout: Rivals: 247Sports: (80) | | | | |
Overall recruit ranking: 247Sports: 164, 15 (C) ESPN: 99, 12 (C)
Note: In many cases, Scout, Rivals, 247Sports, On3, and ESPN may conflict in their listings of height and weight.; In these cases, the average was taken. ESPN grades are on a 100-point scale.; Sources: "Louisville 2014 Basketball Commitments". Rivals.; "2014 Louisville Commits". Scout.; "2014 Player Commitments – Louisville". ESPN.; "Scout.com Team Recruiting Rankings". Scout.; "2014 Team Ranking". Rivals.

== College career ==
Mahmoud enrolled at Louisville on June 30, 2014. In Mahmoud's freshman season, he played in 30 games and averaged 1.2 points, 1.4 rebounds, and 0.7 blocks per game in 7.9 minutes per game. Mahmoud's sophomore season was cut short by a foot injury in mid-February 2016.

| Year | Team | GP | GS | MPG | FG% | 3P% | FT% | RPG | APG | SPG | BPG | PPG |
|---|---|---|---|---|---|---|---|---|---|---|---|---|
| 2014–15 | Louisville | 30 | 2 | 7.9 | .400 | .000 | .750 | 1.4 | .4 | .1 | .7 | 1.2 |
| 2015–16 | Louisville | 22 | 2 | 13.1 | .470 | .000 | .400 | 3.0 | .5 | .5 | 1.3 | 3.2 |
| 2016–17 | Louisville | 31 | 16 | 18.7 | .620 | .000 | .642 | 4.0 | .8 | .9 | 2.1 | 5.7 |
| 2017–18 | Louisville | 36 | 22 | 23.4 | .550 | .000 | .500 | 5.0 | 1.0 | .8 | 2.9 | 6.8 |

== Professional career ==
After going undrafted in the 2018 NBA draft, Mahmoud signed with the Memphis Grizzlies for the NBA Summer League. On August 25, 2018, Mahmoud returned to Egypt to sign his first professional contract with Zamalek.

Mahmoud was on the Zamalek roster for the 2021 BAL season and helped his team win the first-ever BAL championship. He led the team in steals and blocks and was named the BAL Defensive Player of the Year at the end of the season. In the same 2020–21 season, Mahmoud won his second Super League title and was named the MVP of the competition for the first time.

In August 2021, Mahmoud played for the Toronto Raptors for the NBA Summer League. He was the first BAL player to ever play in the NBA Summer League.

On May 29, 2022, Mahmoud extended his contract with Zamalek for two more seasons, until 2024. In October 2022, he changed teams when he signed for Al Ittihad Alexandria in a reported three-year deal. On May 2, 2024, Mahmoud won the Egyptian Cup with Al Ittihad and was named tournament MVP.

In May 2023, after the end of the Egyptian League season, Mahmoud joined Libyan club Al Ahli Tripoli for the remainder of the 2022–23 season.

== International career ==
Mahmoud represented Egypt in the 2012 FIBA Under-17 World Championship, where he averaged 5.4 ppg, 4.0 rpg and 2.1 bpg. He also represented Egypt in the AfroBasket 2013 and AfroBasket 2021.

== BAL career statistics ==
Legend
| GP | Games played | GS | Games started | MPG | Minutes per game |
| FG% | Field goal percentage | 3P% | 3-point field goal percentage | FT% | Free throw percentage |
| RPG | Rebounds per game | APG | Assists per game | SPG | Steals per game |
| BPG | Blocks per game | PPG | Points per game | **Bold** | Career high |
| † | Won an BAL championship | * | Led the league |

| Year | Team | GP | GS | MPG | FG% | 3P% | FT% | RPG | APG | SPG | BPG | PPG |
|---|---|---|---|---|---|---|---|---|---|---|---|---|
| 2021† | Zamalek | 6 | 6 | 25.4 | **.636** | **1.000** | .231 | 6.8 | **4.8** | **2.3** | **2.8*** | 7.7 |
| 2022 | Zamalek | **8** | **8** | **28.7** | .632 | – | **.389** | **9.8** | 3.5 | .8 | 2.4 | **9.9** |

== Awards and accomplishments ==
=== Club career ===
Zamalek

- BAL champion: (2021)
- 2× Egyptian Super League: (2019, 2021)

Ittihad Alexandria

- Egyptian Super League:(2024)
- Egyptian Cup:(2024)
- Egyptian Super Cup:(2022)

=== Individual ===
- All-BAL First Team (2021)
- BAL Defensive Player of the Year (2021)
- Egyptian League MVP (2021)
- ACC All-Defensive Team (2018)
