= Will Voigt =

American basketball coach

Boise State Broncos
- Position: Associate head coach
- League: Pac-12 Conference

Personal information
- Born: August 18, 1976 (age 50) Cabot, Vermont. U.S.

Career information
- High school: Cabot (Cabot, Vermont)
- College: Pomona
- Coaching career: 1998–present

Career history

Coaching
- 1998–1999: Los Angeles Clippers (intern)
- 1999–2001: San Antonio Spurs (video coord.)
- 2001–2002: Texas (assistant)
- 2002–2003: Metro State (assistant)
- 2003–2006: Ulriken Elite
- 2006–2009: Vermont Frost Heaves
- 2009–2014: Bakersfield Jam
- 2014–2015: Shanxi Brave Dragons (assistant)
- 2015–2016: Nigeria
- 2017–2019: Angola
- 2020 & 2021: Telekom Baskets Bonn
- 2022: Zamalek
- 2023–2024: Austin Spurs
- 2024–2025: BYU (assistant)
- 2025–2026: BYU (associate)
- 2026–present: Boise State (associate)

William Voigt (born August 18, 1976) is an American basketball coach who is currently serving as an associate head coach of the Boise State men's basketball team. Voigt has held various coaching roles at the professional, minor league, and collegiate levels in the United States and in other countries, including coaching in the 2016 Summer Olympics. Immediately prior to joining the Cougars, Voigt was associate head coach for the BYU Cougars.

== Early life ==
Voigt grew up in Cabot, Vermont and attended Cabot High School, where he played varsity basketball and soccer. He attended Pomona College in California, lettering in soccer, and graduating with a degree in political science.

== Coaching career ==
During college, Voigt landed an internship with the NBA's Los Angeles Clippers. After graduation, he became a video coordinator with the San Antonio Spurs, and a year later entered the college coaching ranks taking on an assistant role with Texas under Rick Barnes. Voigt moved on to Division II powerhouse Metro State as an assistant for Mike Dunlap.

Voigt's first head coaching job came in Norway, taking over Ulriken Elite where he stayed from 2003 to 2006. When Sports Illustrated writer Alexander Wolff decided to purchase an ABA franchise, the Vermont Frost Heaves, he put the naming of the head coach to a vote by the fans. The Vermont native Voigt was selected. In the first two seasons of the franchise's existence, Voigt led the Frost Heaves to back-to-back ABA Championships.

In 2009, Voigt, in similar fashion, was selected by the fans to be the head coach of the Bakersfield Jam of the NBA Development League. Voigt led the Jam to three playoff appearances, before leaving the team in 2014.

Heading back abroad, Voigt spent one season as an assistant coach for the Shanxi Brave Dragons of the Chinese Basketball Association. Voigt was then selected to lead the Nigerian national team at AfroBasket 2015, with Nigeria winning its first title, and automatic qualification to the 2016 Summer Olympics.

In November 2017, Voigt signed a three-year deal with the Angolan Basketball Federation as head coach of the Angola national basketball team. In the same year, he visited the Philippines as consultant to a team in the Philippine Basketball Association. In February 2020, he was also named head coach of German Bundesliga side Telekom Baskets Bonn and stayed for the remainder of the 2019–20 season.

On January 18, 2021, he returned to the Telekom Baskets Bonn as head coach for a second stint. He parted ways with the Bonn team after the conclusion of the 2020–21 season.

In January 2022, Voigt signed a one-year deal as head coach of the Zamalek of the Egyptian Basketball Super League and the Basketball Africa League (BAL). He guided Zamalek to the third place in the 2022 BAL Playoffs, as well as the semi-finals of the Super League.

On June 28, 2023, Voigt was hired as head coach by the Austin Spurs of the NBA G League. On June 3, 2024, Brigham Young University announced that Voigt will become an assistant coach of the Cougar's men's basketball team. On June 29, 2026, Voigt was hired as associate coach for Boise State.

== Personal life ==
Voigt is the son of former Vermont Poet Laureate Ellen Bryant Voigt.

== See also ==
- List of FIBA AfroBasket winning head coaches
