= Michael Fakuade =

American-Nigerian basketball player

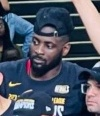

Personal information
- Born: February 18, 1989 (age 37) Chicago, Illinois
- Listed height: 6 ft 7 in (2.01 m)
- Listed weight: 235 lb (107 kg)

Career information
- High school: Von Steuben High School (Chicago, Illinois)
- College: Northern Illinois (2007–2010); Illinois-Springfield (2010–2012)
- NBA draft: 2012: undrafted
- Playing career: 2013–2024
- Position: Power forward

Career history
- 2013–2014: ETB Schwarz-Weiß
- 2014–2015: Força Lleida
- 2015–2016: Palencia
- 2016–2017: Breogán
- 2017–2018: Gipuzkoa Basket
- 2018–2019: Orléans Loiret
- 2019–2020: Châlons-Reims
- 2020–2021: Wilki Morskie Szczecin
- 2021: Zamalek
- 2021: Al Ahly
- 2022: Alba Fehérvár
- 2022: Al Ahly
- 2022-2023: Kagoshima Rebnise
- 2023: Al Ahly
- 2024: Real Estelí

Career highlights
- 2× BAL champion (2021, 2023); Arab Club Championship winner (2021); GLVC All-First Team (2012); GLVC All-Defensive Team (2012)

Michael Fakuade (born February 18, 1989) is an American-Nigerian former basketball player. Fakuade is a two-time BAL champion, having won the title in 2021 with Zamalek and in 2023 with Al Ahly.

== College career ==
Fakuade played his first three seasons with Northern Illinois Huskies men's basketball team. In 2010, he transferred to UIS Prairie Stars.

== Professional career ==
Fakuade was on the Zamalek roster for the 2021 BAL season, where the team won the first-ever BAL championship. He scored a game-high 15 points in the 2021 BAL Finals.

On September 20, 2021, Fakuade signed with Egyptian club Al Ahly to play in the 2021 Arab Club Basketball Championship. He went on to win the club's first Arab championship with Al Ahly.

After a stint with Alba Fehérvár in Hungary, Fakuade returned to Al Ahly in September 2022.

On December 23, 2022, Fakuade signed with Kagoshima Rebnise of the Japanese B.League.

He returned to Al Ahly in May 2023, to strengthen the club in the 2023 BAL Playoffs. On May 27, 2023, he won his second BAL championship with Al Ahly after defeating AS Douanes in the final. Fakuade became the second player ever to have won two BAL championships.

== BAL career statistics ==
Legend
GP	Games played	GS	Games started	MPG	Minutes per game
FG%	Field goal percentage	3P%	3-point field goal percentage	FT%	Free throw percentage
RPG	Rebounds per game	APG	Assists per game	SPG	Steals per game
BPG	Blocks per game	PPG	Points per game	**Bold**	Career high
†	Won an BAL championship

Year	Team	GP	GS	MPG	FG%	3P%	FT%	RPG	APG	SPG	BPG	PPG
2021†	Zamalek	6	0	18.7	.538	.312	.583	4.7	.7	.7	.3	11.3
Career		6	0	18.7	.538	.312	.583	4.7	.7	.7	.3	11.3

== Awards and accomplishments ==
=== Club ===
Zamalek

- BAL champion: (2021)

Al Ahly

- Arab Club Championship: (2021)

=== Individual ===
- GLVC All-First Team: (2012)
- GLVC All-Defensive Team: (2012)
