= Omar Abada =

Tunisian basketball player (born 1993)

No. 24 – Club Africain
- Position: Point guard
- League: Championnat Pro A

Personal information
- Born: 20 April 1993 (age 33) Tunis, Tunisia
- Listed height: 1.89 m (6 ft 2 in)
- Listed weight: 84 kg (185 lb)

Career information
- Playing career: 2010–present

Career history
- 2010–2018: Étoile de Radès
- 2018–2019: Saint-Chamond
- 2019–2021: US Monastir
- 2021–2022: Al-Ittihad Jeddah
- 2022–2023: Al Wahda Damascus
- 2023-2024: Al Ahly
- 2024–present: Club Africain
- 2025: FUS Rabat
- 2012: JS Kairouan

Career highlights
- All-BAL First Team (2021); 5× Tunisian League champion (2017, 2018, 2020, 2021, 2025); 5× Tunisian Cup champion (2017, 2018, 2020, 2021, 2024); 2× Tunisian Cup Final MVP (2020, 2021); ACC All-Star Team (2017)
Medals
Men's basketball
Representing Tunisia
AfroBasket
Gold medal – first place	2017 Tunisia/Senegal
Gold medal – first place	2021 Rwanda
Bronze medal – third place	2015 Tunisia

Omar Abada (Arabic: عمر عبادة, born 20 April 1993) is a Tunisian professional basketball player who plays for Club Africain of the Championnat Pro A. Abada also plays for the Tunisia national basketball team.

Born in Tunis, he started his career in 2010 with Étoile de Radès where he stayed for eight seasons. In 2018, Abada played a year in France for Saint-Chamond. A year later, he returned to Tunisia to play for US Monastir.

With Tunisia, he has won the AfroBasket tournament in 2017 and 2021, while being named to the All-Tournament Team in 2021.

== Professional career ==
Abada started his career with Étoile de Radès in the Tunisian Championnat National A and helped the team win two national championships. In the 2017 FIBA Africa Champions Cup he was named to the All-Star Team.

In the 2018–19 season, Abada played one season in France for Saint-Chamond of the LNB Pro B, the national second tier.

In 2019, he returned to Tunisia to play for US Monastir. He played in the inaugural season of the Basketball Africa League (BAL) with Monastir and helped his team reach the Finals. After the tournament, he was named to the All-BAL First Team.

On January 16, 2022, Abada was announced by Zamalek to be on the roster for the 2022 FIBA Intercontinental Cup. However, he never joined the team or played in any game.

In April 2022, Abada joined the Syrian club Al Wahda Damascus of the Syrian Basketball League.

In May 2023, Abada signed for ABC Fighters to play in the 2023 BAL Playoffs. In the quarter-finals, he scored 21 points against Petro de Luanda but could not save the Fighters from being eliminated after a narrow 88–86 defeat.

Abada joined Al Ahly in August 2023, with whom he played in the 2023 FIBA Intercontinental Cup. Later Abada joined Club African in the 2023–24 season, and the team finished as runners-up in the Pro A.

During the 2024–25 season, Abada played with Club Africain. In May 2025, he joined FUS Rabat from Morocco for the 2025 BAL playoffs, returning to the BAL after a one-year absence. He later led Club Africain to the 2024–25 Championnat Pro A title, ending a 9-year title drought of the club.

== National team career ==
Abada has represented Tunisia's national basketball team at the 2015 FIBA Africa Championship in Radès, Tunisia. There, he recorded his team's best two point field goal percentage. At AfroBasket 2017 and AfroBasket 2021, he won gold.

== BAL career statistics ==
Legend
GP	Games played	GS	Games started	MPG	Minutes per game
FG%	Field goal percentage	3P%	3-point field goal percentage	FT%	Free throw percentage
RPG	Rebounds per game	APG	Assists per game	SPG	Steals per game
BPG	Blocks per game	PPG	Points per game	**Bold**	Career high

Year	Team	GP	GS	MPG	FG%	3P%	FT%	RPG	APG	SPG	BPG	PPG
2021	Monastir	6	6	27.6	.400	.312	.708	3.2	5.2	2.0	.3	11.0
2023	ABC Fighters	1	1	32.4	.538	.000	.875	2.0	8.0	2.0	.0	21.0

== Awards and accomplishments ==
=== Club ===
Club Africain

- Championnat Pro A: (2025)

US Monastir

- 2× Championnat National A: (2020, 2021)
- 2× Tunisian Cup: (2020, 2021)

ES Radès

- 2× Championnat National A: (2020, 2021)
- 2× Tunisian Cup: (2017, 2018)

=== Individual ===
- All-BAL First Team: (2021)
- 2× Tunisian Cup Final MVP: (2020, 2021)
- FIBA Africa Clubs Champions Cup All-Star Team: (2017)
- 3× Championnat National A Best Guard: (2017, 2018, 2020)
- Championnat National A Best Tunisian Player: (2017)
