= Augustí Julbe =

Spanish basketball coach (born 1972)

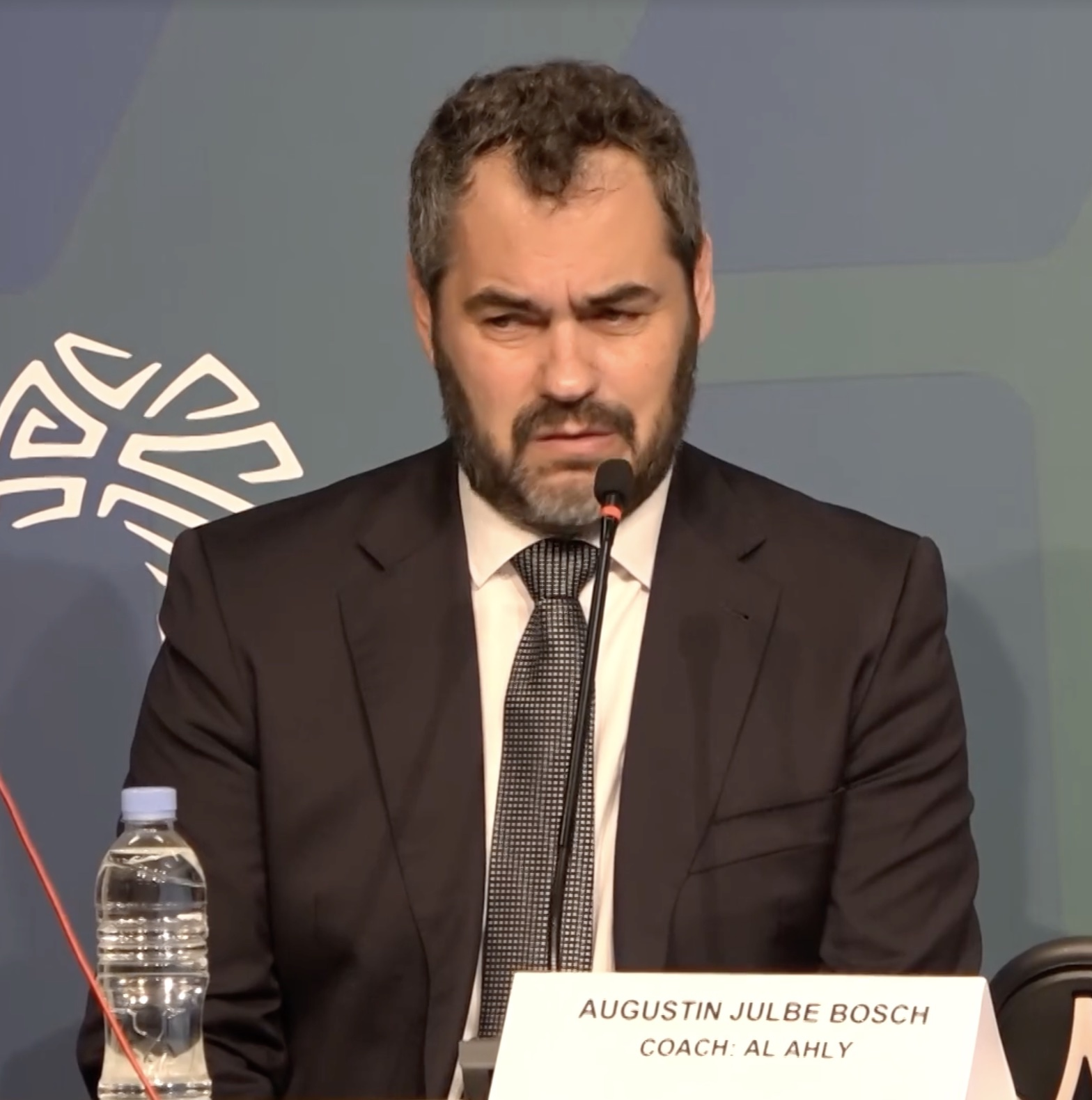
- Julbe in 2023

Dewa United Banten
- Position: Head coach
- League: IBL

Personal information
- Born: 3 May 1972 (age 54) Barcelona, Spain
- Coaching career: 1995–present

Career history

Coaching
- 1995–1996: Cornellà (assistant)
- 1996–1999: Joventut Badalona (assistant)
- 2004–2005: CB Olesa
- 2008–2013: FC Barcelona (assistant)
- 2014–2015: CB Prat
- 2015–2016: Baskonia (assistant)
- 2016–2017: Anadolu Efes (assistant)
- 2018: Fuenlabrada
- 2018–2020: Gran Canaria (assistant)
- 2020: Zamalek
- 2021–2025: Al Ahly
- 2025–present: Dewa United Banten BC
- 2026–present: Egypt (men)

Career highlights
- As head coach: 2× BAL champion (2021, 2023); 4× Egyptian Super League champion (2021–2023, 2025); 2× Egyptian Cup champion (2022, 2023); Arab Championship winner (2021); As assistant coach: 3× ACB League champion (2009, 2011, 2012); 3× Spanish Cup champion (2010, 2011, 2013); 3× Spanish Supercup champion (2009, 2010, 2011); Euroleague champion (2010)

Augustí Julbe Bosch (born 3 May 1972) is a Spanish basketball coach who currently serves as head coach for Dewa United Banten BC of the Indonesian Basketball League (IBL), and the Egyptian national team. He is a two-time BAL champion, having won the league in 2021 with Zamalek and in 2023 with Al Ahly.

== Coaching career ==
Born in Barcelona, Julbe started his coaching career with CB Cornellà as assistant in 1995.

In December 2020, Julbe signed with Egyptian club Zamalek for the 2020–21 season. He also led the team in the inaugural season of the Basketball Africa League (BAL), and led the team to the championship. As such, Julbe became the first coach ever to win the BAL title.

In the summer of 2021, Julbe became the head coach of Al Ahly. He won the double in Egypt in his debut 2021–22 season, winning both the Cup and the Super League title.

In the 2022–23 season, Julbe won the Egyptian Premier League and Egyptian Cup once again. On 27 May 2023, he won the BAL championship with Al Ahly, his second title.

He won a fourth Egyptian championship in the 2024–25 season.
