= Makrem Ben Romdhane =

Tunisian basketball player

Makram Ben Romdhane مكرم بن رمضان
Free Agent
- Position: Power forward / center

Personal information
- Born: 27 March 1989 (age 37) Sousse, Tunisia
- Listed height: 6 ft 9 in (2.06 m)
- Listed weight: 224 lb (102 kg)

Career information
- NBA draft: 2011: undrafted
- Playing career: 2007–present

Career history
- 2007–2013: ES Sahel
- 2013–2014: Murcia
- 2014–2015: Sporting Alexandria
- 2015–2017: ES Sahel
- 2017–2018: Homenetmen Beirut
- 2018–2019: Saint-Chamond
- 2019–2020: Fos Provence
- 2020–2021: US Monastir
- 2021–2026: Benfica

Career highlights
- All-BAL First Team (2021); BAL Sportsmanship Award (2021); African Champions Cup winner (2011); African Champions Cup MVP (2011); 2× African Champions Cup All-Star Team (2011, 2014); AfroBasket MVP (2021); 4× Portuguese League champion (2022, 2023, 2024, 2025); Portuguese Cup winner (2023); Portuguese League Cup winner (2024); Portuguese Supercup champion (2023); 5× Tunisian League champion (2009, 2011–2013, 2021); 4× Tunisian Cup winner (2011–2013, 2021); 3× Egyptian Cup winner (2015–2017); Lebanese League champion (2018); Arab Championship winner (2017)
Medals
Men's basketball
Representing Tunisia
AfroBasket
Gold medal – first place	2011 Antananarivo
Gold medal – first place	2017 Tunisia/Senegal
Gold medal – first place	2021 Rwanda
Bronze medal – third place	2009 Benghazi
Bronze medal – third place	2015 Rades

Makrem Ben Romdhane (alternate spellings: Makram, Macram) (Arabic: مكرم بن رمضان; born 27 March 1989) is a Tunisian professional basketball player who last played for Benfica and Tunisia. He can play at either the small forward, power forward or center positions.

== Professional career ==
Romdhane played pro club basketball with Étoile Sportive du Sahel in the Tunisian Basketball League. On 21 August 2013, Ben Romdhane signed with Murcia of the Spanish ACB League. He played there for one season, averaging 6 points in 32 games. He signed with Alexandria Sporting Club for the 2014–15 season. On 25 July 2017 he officially signed with Homenetmen Beirut.

Romdhane played in the 2021 BAL season with Monastir and was given the BAL Sportsmanship Award after the season. He was also named to the All-BAL First Team after helping Monastir reach the Finals of the inaugural season.

On 30 July 2021, Ben Romdhane signed with Benfica of the Liga Portuguesa de Basquetebol.

== Tunisian national team ==
Romdhane is also a member of the senior men's Tunisian national basketball team, and made his debut for the senior team as a 20-year-old at the 2009 FIBA Africa Championship. He saw action in three games off the bench for the Tunisians, who earned the bronze medal, and their first ever trip to the FIBA World Cup. He was part of the Tunisian team at the 2012 Summer Olympics. At 2015 AfroBasket, Makrem was named for the All-Tournament Team after leading Tunisia to the bronze medal.

He was named MVP of AfroBasket 2021 after helping Tunisia repeat and win the gold medal.

== BAL career statistics ==
Legend
GP	Games played	GS	Games started	MPG	Minutes per game
FG%	Field goal percentage	3P%	3-point field goal percentage	FT%	Free throw percentage
RPG	Rebounds per game	APG	Assists per game	SPG	Steals per game
BPG	Blocks per game	PPG	Points per game	**Bold**	Career high

Year	Team	GP	GS	MPG	FG%	3P%	FT%	RPG	APG	SPG	BPG	PPG
2021	Monastir	6	6	28.4	.611	.417	.333	7.3	3.8	1.3	.3	13.2
Career		6	6	28.4	.611	.417	.333	7.3	3.8	1.3	.3	13.2
