= Abdulrahman Fawzi Hall =

Sports arena in Cairo, Egypt

- Interactive map of Abdulrahman Fawzi Hall
- Location: Cairo, Egypt
- Coordinates: 30°03′30.2652″N 31°12′12.2292″E
- Owner: Zamalek SC
- Capacity: 4,000

Construction
- Opened: 1986
- Renovated: 2020

Tenants
- Zamalek SC (handball) (EHL); Zamalek SC (basketball) (EBSL); Zamalek SC (volleyball) (EVL)

Abdulrahman Fawzi Hall is a covered sports arena in Cairo, Egypt. The arena opened in 1986. The arena is the home venue of the Zamalek SC Handball team of the Egyptian Handball League, the Zamalek SC Basketball team of the Egyptian Basketball Super League, and the Zamalek SC Volleyball team of the Egyptian Volleyball League. All three teams are departments of Zamalek Sporting Club, which owns and operates the arena.

== History ==
When Zamalek Sporting Club began to create the teams of handball, basketball, and volleyball, they saw the importance to build an arena to host the home matches of these teams. They first began to make the designs in the 1970s, later they began working to build the covered hall, which was established in 1986, which they later named Abdulrahman Fawzi Hall, in honor of one of the legends of Zamalek SC, he was the first-ever Arab and African footballer to score at the FIFA World Cup, when he scored twice for Egypt in their 4–2 loss against Hungary in 1934, he is also Egypt's top goalscorer at the FIFA World Cup.

=== Opening ===
The opening ceremony of Abdulrahman Fawzi Hall was held with the opening ceremony of the 5th Arab Volleyball Clubs Championship in 1986, which was won by Zamalek volleyball team for the first time in the club's history, defeating MC Alger in the final which was held in Abdulrahman Fawzi Hall.

=== Renovation ===
The hall was renovated in 2020.

== See also ==
- List of indoor arenas in Egypt
