= Mostafa Meshaal (basketball) =

Egyptian basketball player

Mostafa Meshaal مصطفى مشعل
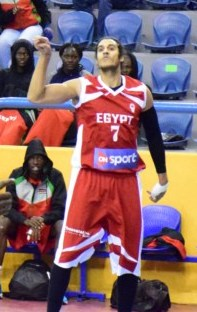
- Meshaal with Egypt in 2017

No. 44 – Heliopolis
- Position: Small forward
- League: Super League

Personal information
- Born: 11 March 1986 (age 39); Cairo, Egypt
- Listed height: 1.96 m (6 ft 5 in)
- Listed weight: 89 kg (196 lb)

Career information
- NBA draft: 2008: undrafted

Career history
- Gezira
- Egypt Insurance
- 2018–2019: Al Ahly
- 2019–2022: Zamalek
- 2022–2023: Misr Insurance
- 2023–present: Heliopolis

Career highlights and awards
- BAL champion (2021)

Mostafa Mohamed Meshaal Elnemr (Arabic: مصطفى مشعل; born 29 March 1995) is an Egyptian basketball player for Heliopolis. Standing at 1.98 m (6 ft 6 in), he plays as small forward.

== Professional career ==
In 2018, Meshaal signed with Al Ahly, transferring from Egypt Insurance. With Al Ahly, Meshaal played in the 2018–19 Africa Basketball League.

Meshaal was on the Zamalek roster for the 2021 BAL season, where the team won the first-ever BAL championship.

== BAL career statistics ==
Legend
GP	Games played	GS	Games started	MPG	Minutes per game
FG%	Field goal percentage	3P%	3-point field goal percentage	FT%	Free throw percentage
RPG	Rebounds per game	APG	Assists per game	SPG	Steals per game
BPG	Blocks per game	PPG	Points per game	**Bold**	Career high
†	Won an BAL championship

Year	Team	GP	GS	MPG	FG%	3P%	FT%	RPG	APG	SPG	BPG	PPG
2021†	Zamalek	3	0	6.3	.667	.667	.167	1.3	.7	1.3	.0	3.7
Career		3	0	6.3	.667	.667	.167	1.3	.7	1.3	.0	3.7
