= Chinemelu Elonu =

Nigerian-American basketball player (born 1987)

No. 5 – Al Qadsia
- Position: Center
- League: Kuwaiti Division I

Personal information
- Born: March 11, 1987 (age 39) Enugu, Nigeria
- Listed height: 6 ft 10 in (2.08 m)
- Listed weight: 235 lb (107 kg)

Career information
- High school: Alief Elsik (Houston, Texas)
- College: Texas A&M (2006–2009)
- NBA draft: 2009: 2nd round, 59th overall pick
- Drafted by: Los Angeles Lakers
- Playing career: 2009–present

Career history
- 2009–2010: CAI Zaragoza
- 2010–2011: Panionios
- 2011–2012: Pau-Orthez
- 2012–2015: Tofaş
- 2013: Jiangsu Monkey King
- 2014: CAI Zaragoza
- 2015: Capitanes de Arecibo
- 2015–2016: Beşiktaş
- 2017: AEK Athens
- 2017–2018: Capitanes de Arecibo
- 2017–2018: AEK Athens
- 2018: Reggiana
- 2020–2023: Capitanes de Arecibo
- 2021: Zamalek
- 2022–2023: Al-Jahra
- 2024–present: Al Qadsia

Career highlights
- BAL champion (2021); FIBA Champions League champion (2018); Greek Cup winner (2018); 2× BSN champion (2018, 2021); BSN rebounding leader (2022); 3× BSN blocks leader (2020–2022); LEB Oro champion (2010); First-team All-Big 12 (2009)
- Stats at Basketball Reference

Chinemelu David Elonu Jr. (born March 11, 1987) is a Nigerian professional basketball player for Al Qadsia of the Kuwaiti Division I. He played college basketball for Texas A&M.

== High school career ==
Elonu attended Alief Elsik High School where he averaged 15.0 points per game as a senior, helping the team to a 33–5 record while posting career highs of 21 points and 20 rebounds. He was ranked as the No. 48 power forward in the country by Scout.com.

== College career ==
Elonu played at Texas A&M University, where he played with the Aggies, from 2006 to 2009. In his junior and final season, he averaged 10 points and 7 rebounds per game. He graduated from the school in May 2009 with a Bachelor of Science degree in Agricultural Leadership and Development.

== Professional career ==
Elonu was drafted by the Los Angeles Lakers with the 59th pick in the 2009 NBA draft. He later signed a two-year deal with the Spanish team CAI Zaragoza where he averaged 6.3 points and 5.8 rebounds per game. He had an opt-out clause that would have allowed him to sign with the Lakers after the 2009–10 season. After one year, he left Zaragoza.

In August 2010, Elonu signed a contract with Panionios in Greece. He left Panionios before the end of the season after being replaced by Ryvon Covile. On January 25, 2011, Elonu signed a contract with Pau-Orthez in France in order to replace the injured Travon Bryant. He averaged 10.0 points and 8.3 rebounds per game.

In July 2012, Elonu joined the Los Angeles Lakers for the 2012 NBA Summer League. On August 16, 2012, Elonu signed a contract with Tofaş of the Turkish Basketball Super League. In June 2013, Elonu signed with Jiangsu Monkey King from China. For the 2013–14 season, Elonu re-signed with Tofaş. During his second stint with the Turkish club, Elonu averaged 12.1 points, 8.5 rebounds and 1.1 blocks in the Turkish League and 16.2 points, 9.7 rebounds and 1.8 blocks in the EuroChallenge.

In May 2014, Elonu came back to CAI Zaragoza after four years, and signed a contract until the end of the 2013–14 ACB season. On July 17, 2014, he returned to Tofaş. During the season, he participated at the Turkish League Slam Dunk contest, among with Kenny Gabriel, Jan Vesely, Furkan Korkmaz, JaJuan Johnson, Patric Young, Sinan Güler and Sean Williams.

On June 9, 2015, Elonu signed with Capitanes de Arecibo of Puerto Rico. On November 9, 2015, Elonu signed with Turkish club Beşiktaş for the 2015–16 season. With them he averaged 8.0 points, 6.1 rebounds and 1.1 blocks in the Turkish League and 9.4 points, 6.0 rebounds, 1.6 steals and 1.6 blocks in EuroCup.

On January 2, 2017, Elonu signed with AEK Athens in Greece for the rest of the 2016–17 season, replacing Randal Falker on the team's squad. On June 5, 2017, he re-joined the Capitanes de Arecibo for the rest of the 2017 BSN season.

On August 18, 2017, Elonu re-joined AEK Athens for the 2017–18 season. Where they won the Basketball Champions League (BCL).

On September 28, 2018, Elonu signed a deal with Italian club Pallacanestro Reggiana.

On April 18, 2021, Elonu signed with Egyptian side Zamalek to play in the 2021 BAL season. He won the first-ever BAL championship with the team. In July 2021, he came back to Capitanes de Arecibo.

On August 28, 2024, Elonu signed with Al Qadsia of the Kuwaiti Division I.

On June 24, 2026, Elonu’s draft rights were traded to the New York Knicks.

== Statistics ==
Legend
| GP | Games played | MPG | Minutes per game | FG% | Field goal percentage |
| 3P% | 3-point field goal percentage | FT% | Free throw percentage | RPG | Rebounds per game |
| APG | Assists per game | SPG | Steals per game | BPG | Blocks per game |
| PPG | Points per game | **Bold** | Career high | | Led the league |

Regular season

| Year | Team | League | GP | MPG | FG% | 3P% | FT% | RPG | APG | SPG | BPG | PPG |
|---|---|---|---|---|---|---|---|---|---|---|---|---|
| 2010–11 | Panionios | GBL | 9 | 21.2 | .471 | – | .571 | 6.6 | 0.2 | **0.7** | **1.7** | 7.6 |
| 2011–12 | Pau-Orthez | LNB Pro A | **30** | **24.2** | .634 | – | .603 | **8.3** | **0.6** | 0.6 | 1.1 | **10.4** |
| 2012–13 | Tofaş | BSL | 29 | 21.2 | **.661** | – | .515 | 7.6 | 0.3 | 0.4 | 1.1 | 9.6 |
| 2016–17 | AEK Athens | GBL | 14 | 14.1 | .623 | – | **.743** | 5.7 | 0.5 | 0.5 | 0.4 | 6.6 |
| 2017–18 | AEK Athens | GBL | 12 | 13.2 | .523 | – | .556 | 4.3 | 0.6 | 0.1 | 0.9 | 5.1 |

Playoffs

| Year | Team | League | GP | MPG | FG% | 3P% | FT% | RPG | APG | SPG | BPG | PPG |
|---|---|---|---|---|---|---|---|---|---|---|---|---|
| 2013 | Tofaş | BSL | 2 | 23.0 | .474 | .500 | .833 | 8.5 | 1.0 | 0.0 | 0.5 | 11.5 |
| 2016–17 | AEK Athens | GBL | 9 | 15.0 | .632 | – | .722 | 5.6 | 0.4 | 0.1 | 0.8 | 6.8 |

=== FIBA Champions League ===
| † | Denotes seasons in which Chinemelu Elonu won the FIBA Champions League |

| Year | Team | GP | MPG | FG% | 3P% | FT% | RPG | APG | SPG | BPG | PPG |
|---|---|---|---|---|---|---|---|---|---|---|---|
| 2016–17 | A.E.K. | 8 | **14.0** | .545 | – | .481 | **4.5** | .3 | **.3** | **1.3** | **6.1** |
| 2017–18† | A.E.K. | **11** | 12.4 | **.632** | – | **.700** | 3.3 | **.4** | .2 | .5 | 5.6 |

=== BAL ===
| † | Denotes seasons in which Chinemelu Elonu won the BAL championship |

| Year | Team | GP | GS | MPG | FG% | 3P% | FT% | RPG | APG | SPG | BPG | PPG |
|---|---|---|---|---|---|---|---|---|---|---|---|---|
| 2021† | Zamalek | 6 | 0 | 18.2 | .594 | .000 | .571 | 7.7 | .8 | .7 | .8 | 8.3 |
| Career | | 6 | 0 | 18.2 | .594 | .000 | .571 | 7.7 | .8 | .7 | .8 | 8.3 |

== Personal life ==
The son of Dozie and Amaka Elonu, he majored in agricultural leadership. He has also one sister, Adaora Elonu currently playing for Uni Girona CB.

Elonu has lived in Puerto Rico since 2015.
