= Mostafa Kejo =

Egyptian basketball player (born 1994)

Mostafa Kejo مصطفي كيجو
No. 10 – Al Ahly
- Position: Power forward
- League: Egyptian Basketball Super League; Basketball Africa League

Personal information
- Born: 22 October 1994 (age 31) Cairo, Egypt
- Listed height: 2.04 m (6 ft 8 in)

Career information
- Playing career: 2012–present

Career history
- 2012–2023: Zamalek
- 2023–present: Al Ahly

Career highlights
- BAL champion (2021); 2× Egyptian League champion (2019, 2021)

Moustafa Kejo Elmekawi (Arabic: مصطفى كيجو المكاوي; born 22 October 1994) is an Egyptian basketball player who plays for Al Ahly and the Egyptian national team. He plays as a power forward or center.

== Professional career ==
=== Zamalek (2012-2023) ===
Since 2012, Kejo plays for Zamalek in the Egyptian Basketball Super League. In 2019, he won the Egyptian championship. Kejo was on the roster for the 2021 BAL season, where he started all games for Zamalek and eventually won the BAL championship. He contributed 6.5 points and 6 rebounds per game.

Kejo went on to play eleven seasons with Zamalek, winning two Egyptian Premier Leagues in this tenure.

=== Al Ahly (2023-present) ===
In August 2023, Kejo signed a 4-year contract with Al Ahly. Kejo made his debut for Al Ahly on 21 September, when his double-double of 10 points and 13 rebounds gave him the Man of the Match in the club's win over the NBA G League Ignite in the 2023 FIBA Intercontinental Cup. The win was the first ever of an African club in the competition's history.

== National team career ==
Kejo plays for the Egyptian national team, where he participated at the 2014 FIBA Basketball World Cup at age 19. He also played at AfroBasket 2017 and the Afrobasket 2021.

== BAL career statistics ==
Legend
GP	Games played	GS	Games started	MPG	Minutes per game
FG%	Field goal percentage	3P%	3-point field goal percentage	FT%	Free throw percentage
RPG	Rebounds per game	APG	Assists per game	SPG	Steals per game
BPG	Blocks per game	PPG	Points per game	**Bold**	Career high
†	Won an BAL championship	*	Led the league

Year	Team	GP	GS	MPG	FG%	3P%	FT%	RPG	APG	SPG	BPG	PPG
2021†	Zamalek	6	6	16.2	.405	.000	.409	6.0	.8	.5	.03	6.5
Career		6	6	16.2	.405	.000	.409	6.0	.8	.5	.03	6.5
