= Ahmed Abdelwahab =

Egyptian basketball player (born 2001)

Ahmed Abdelwahab أحمد ياسر عبد الوهاب
No. 10 – Zamalek
- Position: Small forward
- League: Super League; Basketball Africa League

Personal information
- Born: 18 June 2001 (age 25)
- Listed height: 1.98 m (6 ft 6 in)

Career information
- Playing career: 2020–present

Career history
- 2020–present: Zamalek

Career highlights
- BAL champion (2021)

Ahmed Yasser Abdelwahab (Arabic: أحمد ياسر عبد الوهاب; born 18 June 2001) is an Egyptian basketball player for Zamalek. Standing at 1.98 m (6 ft 6 in), he plays as small forward.

== Early career ==
Abdelwahab started playing basketball at 6 years old at Zamalek. Because of his father's work, he moved to the United Arab Emirates where he played for the junior teams of Al-Nasr SC and later to Qatar, where he played with Al-Gharafa.

== Professional career ==
Abdelwahab played his first minutes for the Zamalek first team when he was 17. He also joined Zamalek in the 2021 BAL season, where the team won the first-ever BAL championship.

== BAL career statistics ==
Legend
GP	Games played	GS	Games started	MPG	Minutes per game
FG%	Field goal percentage	3P%	3-point field goal percentage	FT%	Free throw percentage
RPG	Rebounds per game	APG	Assists per game	SPG	Steals per game
BPG	Blocks per game	PPG	Points per game	**Bold**	Career high
†	Won an BAL championship

Year	Team	GP	GS	MPG	FG%	3P%	FT%	RPG	APG	SPG	BPG	PPG
2021†	Zamalek	5	0	8.2	.417	.143	.500	1.0	.6	.0	.0	2.4
Career		5	0	8.2	.417	.143	.500	1.0	.6	.0	.0	2.4

== Personal ==
Abdelwahab his father, Yasser, was a successful basketball player, who also played for Zamalek and won the 1992 FIBA Africa Club Champions Cup with the club.
