= Eslam Salem =

Egyptian basketball player

Eslam Salem إسلام سالم
No. 9 – Zamalek
- Position: Shooting guard
- League: Super League; Basketball Africa League

Personal information
- Born: 20 March 1989 (age 37)
- Listed height: 1.91 m (6 ft 3 in)

Career information
- NBA draft: 2011: undrafted

Career history
- 2011–2019: Gezira
- 2019–present: Zamalek

Career highlights
- BAL champion (2021)

Eslam Salem Ali Mohamed (Arabic: إسلام سالم; born 20 March 1989) is an Egyptian basketball player for Zamalek. Standing at 1.91 m (6 ft 3 in), he plays as a shooting guard.

== Professional career ==
Salem was on the Zamalek roster for the 2021 BAL season, where he started in all six games and went on to win the first-ever BAL championship.

== National team career ==
Salem has been a member of the Egyptian national basketball team. He played in the qualifiers for the 2019 FIBA Basketball World Cup.

== BAL career statistics ==
Legend
GP	Games played	GS	Games started	MPG	Minutes per game
FG%	Field goal percentage	3P%	3-point field goal percentage	FT%	Free throw percentage
RPG	Rebounds per game	APG	Assists per game	SPG	Steals per game
BPG	Blocks per game	PPG	Points per game	**Bold**	Career high
†	Won an BAL championship

Year	Team	GP	GS	MPG	FG%	3P%	FT%	RPG	APG	SPG	BPG	PPG
2021†	Zamalek	6	6	20.8	.343	.200	.500	1.2	1.2	.8	.0	5.2
Career		6	6	20.8	.343	.200	.500	1.2	1.2	.8	.0	5.2
