= Haytham Elsaharty =

Egyptian basketball player

Haytham Elsaharty هيثم السحرتى
Personal information
- Born: 26 August 1985 (age 41)
- Listed height: 1.96 m (6 ft 5 in)

Career information
- NBA draft: 2007: undrafted
- Playing career: 2008–2021
- Position: Small forward
- Number: 41

Career history
- 2008–2021: Zamalek

Career highlights
- BAL champion (2021); 2× Egyptian League champion (2019, 2021)

Haytham Ahmed Abdel Hamid Sehrty (Arabic: هيثم السحرتى; born 26 August 1985) is an Egyptian former basketball player. He played his entire 14-year career for Zamalek. Standing at 1.98 m (6 ft 6 in), he played as small forward.

== Professional career ==
From 2008, Elsaharty played for Zamalek in his native Egypt. He was the captain of the roster for the 2021 BAL season, where the team won the first-ever BAL championship. After the team won the 2021 Egyptian Super League, Elsaharty announced his retirement.

== BAL career statistics ==
Legend
GP	Games played	GS	Games started	MPG	Minutes per game
FG%	Field goal percentage	3P%	3-point field goal percentage	FT%	Free throw percentage
RPG	Rebounds per game	APG	Assists per game	SPG	Steals per game
BPG	Blocks per game	PPG	Points per game	**Bold**	Career high
†	Won an BAL championship

Year	Team	GP	GS	MPG	FG%	3P%	FT%	RPG	APG	SPG	BPG	PPG
2021†	Zamalek	1	0	6.3	.000	–	–	.0	.0	.0	.0	.0
Career		1	0	6.3	.000	–	–	.0	.0	.0	.0	.0
