= Omar Hesham =

Egyptian basketball player

No. 4 – Zamalek
- Position: Shooting guard
- League: Super League; Basketball Africa League

Personal information
- Born: 29 March 1995 (age 31)
- Listed height: 1.87 m (6 ft 2 in)

Career history
- 2013–present: Zamalek

Career highlights
- BAL champion (2021); 2× Egyptian League champion (2019, 2021)

Omar Hesham Hussein (Arabic: عمر هشام; born 29 March 1995) is an Egyptian basketball player for Zamalek. Standing at 1.87 m (6 ft 1 1/2 in), he plays as a shooting guard. He is also a member of the Egypt national basketball team.

== Professional career ==
He has been playing for Zamalek SC since he was a child. Since 2013, Hesham is on the roster for Zamalek. He was also on the team in the 2021 BAL season, where the team won the first-ever BAL championship. In 2021, he won his second Egyptian Super League championship after 2019 championship.

== National team career ==
Hesham played with the Egypt national basketball team roster for the 2019 FIBA Basketball World Cup qualifiers. He also played with Egypt at FIBA AfroCan 2019, where he averaged 8.3 points over three games. In 2021, he is also on the roster for AfroBasket 2021.

== BAL career statistics ==
Legend
GP	Games played	GS	Games started	MPG	Minutes per game
FG%	Field goal percentage	3P%	3-point field goal percentage	FT%	Free throw percentage
RPG	Rebounds per game	APG	Assists per game	SPG	Steals per game
BPG	Blocks per game	PPG	Points per game	**Bold**	Career high
†	Won an BAL championship

Year	Team	GP	GS	MPG	FG%	3P%	FT%	RPG	APG	SPG	BPG	PPG
2021†	Zamalek	6	0	16.7	.409	.200	.667	1.5	.8	.2	.0	4.0
Career		6	0	16.7	.409	.200	.667	1.5	.8	.2	.0	4.0

== Honours ==
Zamalek

- Basketball Africa League: 2021
- Egyptian Basketball Super League: 2018–19, 2020–21
