= Zamalek SC Basketball =

Egyptian basketball team

Zamalek
- Leagues: ESL
- Founded: 1937; 89 years ago
- History: C.I.S.C. 1937–1941; Farouk I 1941–1952; Zamalek SC; 1952–Present
- Arena: Abdulrahman Fawzi Hall
- Capacity: 4,000
- Location: Giza, Egypt
- Team colors: White, red, black
- President: Hussein Labib
- Head coach: Wael Badr
- Championships: 1 BAL; 1 FABL; 15 ESL; 13 Egyptian Cup; 3 Egyptian Super Cup
- Website: www.el-zamalek.com
Home	Away

Zamalek Basketball Club (Arabic: نادي الزمالك لكرة السلة) also known as Zamalek B.C. or simply as Zamalek SC, is a men's professional basketball club that is based in Giza, Egypt. The basketball team is a part of the Zamalek SC multi-sports club. The club is a founding member and shareholder of the Egyptian Basketball Federation, and competes in the Egyptian Basketball Super League (ESL).

Zamalek is regarded as one of the most successful clubs in Egypt history; their squads have won 18 National League championships, including 5-in-a-row. They have played in three different National Leagues since 1937, including the Egyptian Kingdom Basketball League (1937–1952), Egyptian Republic Basketball League (1952–1972), Egyptian Basketball Super League (1972 onwards). They have also won 13 National Cup titles, 3 Egyptian Super Cup, 23 Cairo Basketball League, And 1 Basketball Africa League, 1 FIBA Africa League. The club plays domestic home matches in the Abdulrahman Fawzi Hall, Zamalek's supporters are known as White Knights.

Zamalek is the 1st Egyptian team to participate in the Basketball Africa League, the FIBA Intercontinental Cup and the FIBA Africa Clubs Champions Cup. They have participated in every season of the Egyptian Basketball Super League without interruption since the inception of the league in 1972. They are the most successful Egyptian team in FIBA Africa competitions, being the first ever winner of the 2021 BAL season. They have won the Egyptian Cup, and Egyptian Super Cup the most times as well, and won the Domestic Double 7 Times. They are the only Egyptian team to win the Domestic Triple three times. Zamalek have also been 3 times FABL runners-up, played a total of 5 finals, and have also participated 7 times in the Final Four. The first major achievement of Zamalek in African competitions was their presence in the 1971–72 FIBA African Champions Cup semi-finals, but it was in the 1970s that Zamalek made their biggest mark. They became the First Ever Egyptian club that reached the Final, being runners-up in two consecutive seasons (1975 and 1976), winning their first Afro League title in 1992, (11-11-1992) After convincing and winning all matches in the group stage A round-robin tournament in Abdulrahman Fawzi Hall. After Final 1998, Zamalek become the most Egyptian team reached a Final Four in FABL in 6 Times. Most African Team win a Game in Euro League with 3 Game, 1st Game in (9-11-1978) 1978–79 Against Klosterneuburg, 2nd Game in (16-10-1980) 1980–81 Vs FC Porto, 3rd Game in (20-11-1980) 1980–81 Vs Viganello.

As parent athletic club was founded in 1911, has kept the team name changing frequently. From 1937 until 1941, it was called Faiez International Sports Club (C.I.S.C.), a.k.a. El Mokhtalat Club (Mixed Courts). From 1941 to 1952, Farouk I, King of Egypt and Sudan, bestowed the royal sponsorship on the club, and the club name was renamed to Nady Farouk El Awal (Farouk I Club). Ismail Bak Shirin of Mohammed Ali's family took the post of vice president. From 1952 until present the renamed to Zamalek SC. After the army coup in 1952, the club was renamed Zamalek after the area where the club was situated. The club later moved for the last time to 26 July Street, and occupied an area of 35 acres (140,000 m^{2}) and hosted 24 different sports.

== History ==
=== Zamalek in Europe ===
Zamalek was previously invited to participate in the FIBA European Champions Cup (now known as the EuroLeague) seven times. The first participation was in the 1970–71 season, during which the club faced Real Madrid Baloncesto in the second round of the tournament. The second participation was in the 1974–75 season, during which the club faced Slavia VŠ Praha in the second round of the tournament. The third participation was in the 1975–76 season, during which the club faced PBC Academic in the first round of the tournament. The fourth participation was in the 1978–79 season, with Zamalek in group A, alongside Real Madrid Baloncesto, Budapesti Honvéd SE and Klosterneuburg Dukes, the club came in fourth place in its group after winning one match. The fifth participation was in the 1979–80 season, with Zamalek in group A, alongside KK Bosna Royal and BC Levski Sofia. The sixth participation was in the 1980–81 season, with Zamalek in group A, alongside Real Madrid Baloncesto, AS Viganello Basket and Porto, the club came in third place in its group after winning two matches. The seventh and to date last participation was in the 1981–82 season, with Zamalek in group C, alongside KK Partizan, Slavia VŠ Praha and Eczacıbaşı SK, but Zamalek withdrew from the tournament before playing any match, and here ended Zamalek's journey in Europe.

=== Basketball Africa League (BAL) Champions ===
Zamalek won the Egyptian Super League in 2019, its first title in 11 years, to qualify for the inaugural season of the Basketball Africa League (BAL), and be the first Egyptian team to participate in Basketball Africa League. In November 2020, Zamalek signed Spanish coach Augustí Julbe as their new head coach. In the 2021 BAL season, Zamalek won its second international title (after the 1992 FIBA Africa Clubs Champions Cup) and the first-ever BAL championship after defeating US Monastir in the Finals. Point guard Walter Hodge was named the first-ever MVP while Anas Mahmoud was awarded the Defensive Player of the Year. Another notable team member was 18 year old Mohab Yasser, who started all games.

After winning the league title in the 2020–21 season, defeating Al Ittihad in the finals, Zamalek stood alone as the most successful basketball club in the Egyptian Basketball Super League with a record 15 titles. Zamalek participated in the 2022 FIBA Intercontinental Cup becoming the first Egyptian team to participate in this competition.

== Honours ==
=== Domestic Competitions ===
National Championships – (57; Record)

- Egyptian Super League

Winners (15; Record): 1973–74, 1974–75, 1975–76, 1976–77, 1977–1978, 1979–80, 1980–81, 1987–88, 1990–91, 1996–97, 1997–98, 2002–03, 2006–07, 2018–19, 2020–21

- Egyptian Kingdom Championship (Defunct)
  Winners (2): 1948–49, 1949–50
- Egyptian Republic Championship (Defunct)

Winners (1): 1969–70

- Egyptian Cup

Winners (13): 1974–75, 1978–79, 1979-80, 1980–81, 1990–91, 1996–97, 1997–98, 1999–00, 2000–01, 2001–02, 2002–03, 2005–06, 2025-26

- Egypt Basketball Super Cup

Winners (3) 1997, 1998, 2003

- Cairo League Championship

Winners (23): 1947, 1952, 1959, 1966, 1967, 1969, 1970, 1972, 1973, 1974, 1975, 1976, 1977, 1981, 1982, 1983, 1984, 1985, 1989–90, 1990–91, 1992–93, 1996–97, 2006–07

=== African Competitions ===
- Basketball Africa League

Winners (1): 2021
Third place (1): 2022

- FIBA Africa Clubs Champions Cup (Defunct)

Winners (1): 1992
Runners-up (3): 1975, 1976, 1998
Third place (2): 1972, 1983

=== Worldwide Competitions ===
- EuroLeague

Quarter-finals : 1979, 1980, 1981, 1982

- FIBA Intercontinental Cup

Fourth place (1): 2022

== Season by season ==
Season	Tier	League	Regular season					Playoffs	Egypt Cup	International competitions		Head coach
Season	Tier	League	Finish	Played	Wins	Losses	Win%	Playoffs	Egypt Cup	League	Result	Head coach
Zamalek
2018–19	1	Super League	5th	14	9	5	.643	Champions	3rd	DNQ		Essam Abdel Hamid
2019–20	1	Super League	5th	14	7	7	.500	Semifinalist	RO16	N/A		Essam Abdel Hamid; Tariq Selim
2020–21	1	Super League	2nd	14	11	3	.786	Champions	3rd	BAL	Champions	Augustí Julbe
2021–22	1	Super League	5th	14	6	8	.429	Semifinalist	3rd	BAL	3rd	Vangelis Angelou; Will Voigt
2022–23	1	Super League	3rd	14	9	5	.643	Semifinalist	Runners-up	DNQ		Ahmed Marei

== Top performances in European & African and worldwide competitions ==
Seasons	Achievement	Notes
EuroLeague
1970–71	Second Round	Eliminated by Real Madrid Baloncesto, 73-87 (L) in Cairo and 54-87 (L) in Madrid
1974–75	Second Round	Eliminated by Slavia VŠ Praha, 65-110 (L) in Prague and 90-91 (L) in Cairo
1975–76	First Round	Eliminated by Academic, 69-74 (L) in Cairo and 64-93 (L) in Sofia
1978–79	Quarter-Final Group Stage	Fourth Place in a group with Real Madrid, Honvéd and Klosterneuburg
1979–80	Quarter-Final Group Stage	Third Place in a group with Bosna, Levski-Spartak
1980–81	Quarter-Final Group Stage	Third Place in a group with Real Madrid, Viganello and FC Porto
1981–82	Quarter-Final Group Stage	Withdrew before Start the competition in Group with KK Partizan, Slavia VŠ Praha and Eczacıbaşı SK
FIBA Intercontinental Cup
2022	Fourth place	Lost to Lakeland Magic 78–113 in the third place game (Cairo)
FIBA Africa Basketball League
1972	Third place	Defeated ASFA in the Third Place Game in Bangui
1975	Final	Lost to ASFA 69-78 in the final (Cairo)
1976	Final	Lost to Hit Trésor 76-89 in the final (Bangui)
1983	Third place	Third Place Game in Dakar
1992	Champions	Defeated ASC Jeanne d'Arc, AS Biao and Africa Sports in the final group stage in Cairo
1998	Final	Defeated Gezira SC, ASA and Lost to MAS Fes in the final group stage in Fes
Basketball Africa League
2021	Champions	Defeated US Monastir 76–63 in the final of Basketball Africa League in Kigali
2022	Third place	Defeated FAP 97–74 in the 2022 BAL Playoffs Third Place Game of Basketball Africa League in Kigali

== Individual awards ==
- BAL Best Record
  - 6–0 (2021)
  - 7–1 (2022)
- All BAL First Team
  - Anas Mahmoud (2021)
  - Walter Hodge (2021)
  - Édgar Sosa (2022)
- BAL MVP
  - Walter Hodge (2021)
- BAL Best Defender
  - Anas Mahmoud (2021)
- BAL Sportsmanship Award
  - Anas Mahmoud (2022)
- Egyptian Super League MVP
  - Terrell Stoglin (2018–19)
  - Anas Mahmoud (2020–21)
- Egyptian Super League Best Younger Player
  - Mohab Yasser (2020–21)

== Players ==
=== Current roster ===
Zamalek roster
Players
Coaches

Pos.	No.	Nat.	Name	Ht.	Age
G	0	(Egypt)	Mohab, Abdalatif	1.95 m (6 ft 5 in)	24 – 7 June 2002
G	1	(Egypt)	Moussa, Adam	1.90 m (6 ft 3 in)	24 – 14 July 2002
PG	3	(Egypt)	Azab, Omar	1.90 m (6 ft 3 in)	28 – 5 April 1998
SG	4	(Egypt)	Hesham, Omar	1.91 m (6 ft 3 in)	31 – 29 March 1995
SG	5	(Egypt)	Ramadan, Bahaa	1.94 m (6 ft 4 in)	21 – 1 January 2005
G	7	(United States)	English, A. J.	1.92 m (6 ft 4 in)	34 – 10 July 1992
G	9	(Egypt)	Salem, Eslam	1.91 m (6 ft 3 in)	37 – 20 March 1989
F	10	(Egypt)	Yasser, Ahmed	2.01 m (6 ft 7 in)	25 – 18 June 2001
C	21	(Egypt)	Elmashad, Hazem	2.05 m (6 ft 9 in)	27 – 22 February 1999
F	25	(Egypt)	Massoud, Ismael	2.05 m (6 ft 9 in)	26 – 6 May 2000
PF	28	(Egypt)	Abdelgawad, Khaled	2.04 m (6 ft 8 in)	27 – 15 February 1999
F/C	33	(Egypt)	Ibrahim, Mohamed	2.00 m (6 ft 7 in)	30 – 18 July 1996
F	55	(Egypt)	Hazem, Ashraf	2.06 m (6 ft 9 in)	23 – 20 November 2002
F/C	77	(Egypt)	Mohamed, Mazen	2.00 m (6 ft 7 in)	23 – 1 January 2003

Head coach

- (Egypt) Ahmed Marei

Legend

- (C) Team captain
- (I) Import player
- (E): BAL Elevate program player
- Injured

- Roster
Updated: March 1, 2026

=== Depth chart ===
Pos.	Starting 5	Bench 1	Bench 2
C	Hazem Elmashad	Mohamed Ibrahim	Mazen Mohamed
PF	Khaled Abdelgawad	Cleanthony Early	Ashraf Hazem
SF	Ismael Massoud	Ahmed Yasser	Bahaa Ramadan
SG	Omar Hesham	Mohab Abdalatif	Eslam Salem
PG	A. J. English	Adam Moussa	Omar Azab

=== Notable players ===
Note: Flags indicate national team eligibility at FIBA-sanctioned events. Players may hold other non-FIBA nationalities not displayed.

Criteria

To appear in this section a player must have either:

- Set a club record or won an individual award while at the club
- Played at least one official international match for their national team at any time
- Played at least one official NBA match at any time.

Former players

- (Egypt) Haytham Elsaharty (2008–2021)
- (Egypt) Mostafa Kejo (2012–2022)
- (Egypt) Omar Hesham (2013–present)
- (Egypt) Ahmed Hatem (2018–present)
- (United States) Terrell Stoglin (2018–2019)
- (Egypt) Anas Osama Mahmoud (2018–2022)
- (Egypt) Eslam Salem (2019–present)
- (Egypt) Mohab Yasser (2020–2021)
- (Ivory Coast) Mouloukou Diabate (2021)
- (United States Virgin Islands) Walter Hodge (2021)
- (Dominican Republic) Édgar Sosa (2021–2022)
- (Nigeria) Ike Diogu (2022)
- (Cameroon) D. J. Strawberry (2022)
- (United States) O. J. Mayo (2022–2023)

=== 2021 BAL champion roster ===
The following was Zamalek's 13-man roster for the 2021 BAL season, which saw them crowned champions:

Zamalek roster
Players
Coaches

Pos.	No.	Nat.	Name	Ht.	Age
PG	00	(United States Virgin Islands)	Hodge, Walter (I)	1.83 m (6 ft 0 in)	40 – 21 September 1986
PG	1	(Ivory Coast)	Diabate, Mouloukou (I)	1.83 m (6 ft 0 in)	39 – 21 July 1987
PG	2	(Egypt)	Abdalatif, Mohab	1.93 m (6 ft 4 in)	24 – 7 June 2002
PF	10	(Egypt)	Osama Mahmoud, Anas	2.13 m (7 ft 0 in)	31 – 9 May 1995
SG	12	(Egypt)	Salem, Islam	1.91 m (6 ft 3 in)	37 – 20 March 1989
PG	14	(Egypt)	Hatem, Ahmed	1.91 m (6 ft 3 in)	31 – 2 September 1995
SG	15	(Egypt)	Hesham, Omar	1.91 m (6 ft 3 in)	31 – 29 March 1995
F	23	(Egypt)	Yasser, Ahmed	1.98 m (6 ft 6 in)	25 – 18 June 2001
PF	24	(Nigeria)	Fakuade, Michael (I)	2.01 m (6 ft 7 in)	37 – 18 February 1989
F	41	(Egypt)	El-Saharty, Haytham (C)	1.96 m (6 ft 5 in)	41 – 26 August 1985
C	42	(Nigeria)	Elonu, Chinemelu (I)	1.93 m (6 ft 4 in)	39 – 11 March 1987
F	44	(Egypt)	Meshaal, Mostafa	1.96 m (6 ft 5 in)	40 – 11 March 1986
PF	50	(Egypt)	Kejo, Mostafa	2.03 m (6 ft 8 in)	31 – 24 October 1994

Head coach

- (Spain) Augustí Julbe

Assistant coach(es)

- (Egypt) Samir Gouda
- (Egypt) Yaser Mohamed

Legend

- (C) Team captain
- (I) Import player
- Injured

- Roster
Updated: May 30, 2021

== List of head coaches ==
The following coaches have held the position of head coach of Zamalek SC basketball team (incomplete):

- (Serbia) Miodrag Perišić: (2009–2011)
- (Egypt) Essam Abdel Hamid: (2018–2020)
- (Egypt) Tariq Selim: (2020)
- (Spain) Augustí Julbe: (2020–2021)
- (Greece) Vangelis Angelou: (2021–2022)
- (United States) Will Voigt: (2022)
- (Egypt) Ahmed Marei: (2022–2023)
- (Egypt) Wael Badr: (2023–present)

== Logo and colors ==
1937–1952

1952–present

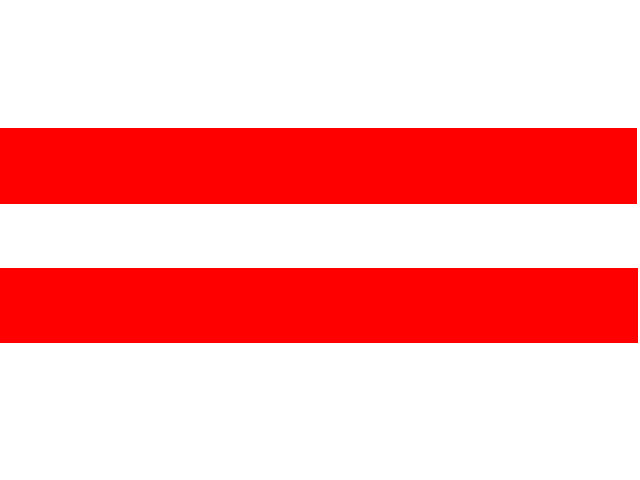
Zamalek team colors

In 1941, the royal emblem of the Kingdom of Egypt and Sudan was the official emblem of the club at the time; when the club's name changed from "El Mokhtalat Club" to "Farouk Club" by royal order from Farouk I. After the revolution of July 23, 1952 on the royal rule in Egypt, the club's name and logo changed; the logo is a mixture of the sporting model and the ancient Egyptian civilization. The logo's main colors express peace and struggle and have not changed since its establishment. The home jersey uses the original Zamalek colours. In the upper half of the logo, the archer that points towards the target appears in a pharaonic uniform as an indication of the common goal between the arrow and Zamalek.

== Home Arena ==
Location	Arena's name	Period
Giza	Abdulrahman Fawzi Hall	1986–present

When Zamalek SC began to create the teams of handball, basketball and, volleyball, they saw the importance to build an arena to host the home matches of these teams. They first began to make the designs in 1970s, later they began working to build the covered hall, which was established in 1986, which they named Abdulrahman Fawzi Hall, in the honor of one of the legend of Zamalek SC, he was the first ever Arab and African footballer to score at the FIFA World Cup, when he scored twice for Egypt in their 4–2 loss against Hungary in 1934, he is also Egypt's top goalscorer at the FIFA World Cup.

The opening ceremony of Abdulrahman Fawzi Hall was held with the opening ceremony of the 5th Arab Volleyball Clubs Championship in 1986, which was won by Zamalek volleyball team for the first time in the club's history, defeating MC Alger in the final which was held in Abdulrahman Fawzi Hall.

== Supporters ==
Zamalek has an Ultras group named the Ultras White Knights that was founded on 17 March 2007 and is known for its pyrotechnic displays. Their motto is "Brotherhood in blood and fans of the free public club".
