= Ahmed Hatem (basketball) =

Egyptian basketball player

No. 6 – Zamalek
- Position: Point guard
- League: Super League; Basketball Africa League

Personal information
- Born: 2 September 1995 (age 31)
- Listed height: 1.91 m (6 ft 3 in)

Career information
- Playing career: 2018–present

Career history
- 2018–present: Zamalek

Career highlights
- BAL champion (2021); 2× Egyptian Super League champion (2019, 2021)

Ahmed Hatem Abdellatef (born 2 September 1995) is an Egyptian basketball player for Zamalek and Egypt. Standing at 1.91 m (6 ft 3 in), he plays as point guard.

== Professional career ==
Hatem was on the Zamalek roster for the 2021 BAL season, where he went on to win the first-ever BAL championship.

== National team career ==
Hatem is a member of the Egyptian national basketball team and played his first games in the fall of 2020 during the 2021 AfroBasket qualifiers.

== BAL career statistics ==
Legend
GP	Games played	GS	Games started	MPG	Minutes per game
FG%	Field goal percentage	3P%	3-point field goal percentage	FT%	Free throw percentage
RPG	Rebounds per game	APG	Assists per game	SPG	Steals per game
BPG	Blocks per game	PPG	Points per game	**Bold**	Career high
†	Won an BAL championship

Year	Team	GP	GS	MPG	FG%	3P%	FT%	RPG	APG	SPG	BPG	PPG
2021†	Zamalek	5	0	11.6	.385	.417	1.000	.4	1.4	.2	.0	4.2
Career		5	0	11.6	.385	.417	1.000	.4	1.4	.2	.0	4.2
