= 2018–19 Egyptian Basketball Premier League =

Egyptian Basketball Super League
- Season: 2018–19
- Teams: 16

Regular season
- Season MVP: Terrell Stoglin (Zamalek)

Finals
- Champions: Zamalek (14th title)
- Runners-up: Gezira
- Semifinalists: Al Ahly; Al Ittihad

Statistical leaders
- Points: Terrell Stoglin (Zamalek)

The 2018–19 Egyptian Basketball Super League was the 45th season of the Egyptian Basketball Super League. It started on 29 October 2018 with the first round of the regular season and ended on 4 May 2019 with the finals. The champions qualified for the 2020 Basketball Africa League (BAL).

Sporting was the defending champion, but was defeated in the quarterfinals by the eventual champions Zamalek, who won their 14th title after defeating Gezira in the finals, the title was decided in Game 5, which Zamalek won 87–66.

== Regular season ==
=== Top Group ===
Pos	Team	Pld	W	L	PF	PA	PD	Pts	Qualification
1	Al Ittihad	14	10	4	1131	1006	+125	20	Advance to playoffs
2	Al Ahly	14	10	4	1086	1040	+46	20	Advance to playoffs
3	Zamalek	14	9	5	1095	1009	+86	18	Advance to playoffs
4	Gezira	14	7	7	1056	1015	+41	14	Advance to playoffs
5	El Gaish Army	14	7	7	986	1020	−34	14	Advance to playoffs
6	Sporting Alexandria	14	7	7	1012	1014	−2	14	Advance to playoffs
7	Smouha	14	6	8	1057	1071	−14	12	Advance to playoffs
8	Egypt Insurance	14	0	14	891	1139	−248	0	Advance to playoffs

Source: Goalzz.com

=== Bottom Group ===
Pos	Team	Pld	W	L	PF	PA	PD	Pts	Qualification
1	Horse Owners' Club	14	10	4	987	951	+36	20	
2	Telecom Egypt	14	9	5	889	882	+7	18	
3	Aviation Club	14	8	6	974	951	+23	16	
4	Olympic	14	8	6	951	924	+27	16	
5	El Shams	14	7	7	918	884	+34	14	
6	Tanta	14	6	8	1015	1000	+15	12	
7	Suez Canal (R)	14	5	9	895	934	−39	10	Relegated to Egyptian Basketball Premier League B
8	El Teram (R)	14	3	11	921	1024	−103	6	Relegated to Egyptian Basketball Premier League B

Source: Goalzz.com
(R) Relegated

== Playoffs ==
The playoffs started on 27 March 2019.

=== Bracket ===
Quarter-finals
1	Al Ittihad	2
8	Egypt Insurance	0
4	Gezira	2
5	Al Gaish Army	0
2	Al Ahly	2
7	Smouha	1
3	Zamalek	2
6	Sporting Alexandria	0

Semi-finals
1	Al Ittihad	2
4	Gezira	3
2	Al Ahly	1
3	Zamalek	3

Finals
4	Gezira	2
3	Zamalek	3

== 2019 Final ==
2019 Egyptian Basketball Super League Finals It is a final between the two Egyptian basketball giants Zamalek and Gezira. For Details 2019 Egyptian Basketball Super League Finals
