= 2023–24 Al Ahly men's basketball season =

Al Ahly
- Head coach: Augustí Julbe (3rd season)
- BAL: Quarterfinalist (lost to Al Ahly Ly)
- Premier League: Runners-up (lost to Al Ittihad)
- Egypt Cup: Runners-up (lost to Al Ittihad)
- Biggest defeat: 20 points Franca 90–70 Al Ahly (22 September 2023; Intercontinental Cup)

The 2023–24 season Al Ahly men's basketball season is the 94th season of Al Ahly's men's basketball team. This season, the Reds are the defending champions in the Basketball Africa League (BAL). They also made their debut in the FIBA Intercontinental Cup, finishing fourth, and became the first African team to ever win a game in the competition following their 21 September win over the NBA G League Ignite.

Al Ahly was unable to defend its BAL championship, as the second seed they were eliminated by seven seed Al Ahly Ly in the quarterfinals. Domestically, the Reds had a disappointing campaign as well as they lost both the Premier League finals and Egyptian Cup finals to Al Ittihad Alexandria Club.

== Transactions ==
| No. | Pos. | Nat. | Name | Age | Moving from | | Type | Ends | Date | Source |
|---|---|---|---|---|---|---|---|---|---|---|
| 32 | PF | (Egypt) | Mostafa Kejo | 29 | Zamalek | (Egypt) | Free agent | 2027 | August 2023 | |
| 28 | C | (Egypt) | Patrick Gardner | 24 | Long Island Nets | (United States) | Free agent | Undisclosed | February 29, 2024 | |
| 12 | G/F | (Ghana) | Prince Ali | 27 | San Pablo Burgos | (Spain) | Free agent | Undisclosed | February 29, 2024 | |

== Roster ==
The following is Al Ahly's roster for the Nile Conference of the BAL. Amr Zahran suffered from a torn ACL in December 2023 and was forced to miss the entire remainder of the season.

=== Current roster ===
Note: Flags indicate national team eligibility at FIBA-sanctioned events. Players may hold other non-FIBA nationalities not displayed.

2024 Al Ahly roster
Players
Coaches

| Pos. | No. | Nat. | Name | Ht. | Age |
|---|---|---|---|---|---|
| SG | 4 | (Egypt) | Saleh, Ehab | 1.85 m (6 ft 1 in) | 31 – 1 August 1995 |
| PF | 6 | (Egypt) | Sarhan, Marwan | 2.03 m (6 ft 8 in) | 34 – 2 May 1992 |
| SF | 7 | (Egypt) | Hendawy, Seifelden (E) | 2.16 m (7 ft 1 in) | 21 – 5 September 2005 |
| PG | 10 | (United States) | Lyons, Mark (I) | 1.85 m (6 ft 1 in) | 37 – 4 July 1989 |
| G | 12 | (Ghana) | Ali, Prince (I) | 1.94 m (6 ft 4 in) | 30 – 11 August 1996 |
| PF | 13 | (Egypt) | Abdelhalim, Amr | 1.93 m (6 ft 4 in) | 35 – 14 June 1991 |
| G/F | 14 | (Egypt) | Elmaraghy, Mohamed | | 34 – 14 October 1992 |
| PG | 15 | (Egypt) | Elgizawy, Karim | 1.93 m (6 ft 4 in) | 21 – 13 January 2005 |
| G/F | 23 | (Egypt) | Abdelkawy, Mohamed | | 35 – 15 August 1991 |
| F | 24 | (United States) | Mitchell, Tony (I) | 1.98 m (6 ft 6 in) | 37 – 7 August 1989 |
| F/C | 28 | (Egypt) | Gardner, Patrick | 2.13 m (7 ft 0 in) | 27 – 16 June 1999 |
| C/PF | 34 | (Egypt) | Kejo, Mostafa | 2.07 m (6 ft 9 in) | 32 – 22 October 1994 |
| C | 41 | (Egypt) | Oraby, Omar | 2.17 m (7 ft 1 in) | 35 – 8 September 1991 |

Head coach

- (Spain) Augustí Julbe

Legend

- (C) Team captain
- Injured

- Roster
Updated: 19 April 2024

== Competitions ==
=== Overview ===
| Competition | First match | Last match | Starting round | Final position | Record | | | | | | | |
| Competition | First match | Last match | Starting round | Final position | Pld | W | D | L | PF | PA | PD | Win % |
|---|---|---|---|---|---|---|---|---|---|---|---|---|
| FIBA Intercontinental Cup | 21 September 2023 | 24 September 2023 | Group phase | Fourth place | 3 | 1 | 0 | 2 | 226 | 247 | −21 | 33.33 |
| BAL | 19 April 2024 | 26 May 2024 | Nile Conference | Quarterfinals | 8 | 5 | | 3 | 699 | 645 | +54 | 62.50 |
| Egyptian Premier League | 8 January 2024 | 13 June 2024 | Preliminary round | Runner-up | 26 | 22 | 0 | 4 | 2,142 | 1,823 | +319 | 84.62 |
| Egyptian Cup | 31 March 2024 | 2 May 2024 | Quarterfinal | Runner-up | 3 | 2 | 0 | 1 | 213 | 181 | +32 | 66.67 |
| Egyptian Super Cup | 20 October 2023 | | Final | Winners | 1 | 1 | 0 | 0 | 64 | 60 | +4 | 100.00 |
| Arab Championship | 1 October 2023 | 12 October 2023 | Group phase | Third place game | 8 | 5 | 0 | 3 | 638 | 593 | +45 | 62.50 |
| Total | | | | | 49 | 36 | 0 | 13 | 3,982 | 3,549 | +433 | 73.47 |

Source: Goalzz, Afrobasket.com

=== FIBA Intercontinental Cup ===
==== Group phase ====
| 21 September 2023 | NBA G League Ignite (United States) | 76–82 | (Egypt) Al Ahly | Singapore Indoor Stadium, Singapore |
| 19:00 | Scoring by quarter: 21–20, 22–25, 16–17, 17–20 |
| | Pts: Smith 18; Rebs: Almansa 8 Asts: Johnson 6 | Boxscore | Pts: Amin 15; Rebs: Kejo 13; Asts: Cole 9 | Referees: Yohan Rosso (FRA), Scott Beker (AUS), Viola Györgyi (ROU) |

| 22 September 2023 | Sesi Franca (Brazil) | 90–70 | (Egypt) Al Ahly | Singapore Indoor Stadium, Singapore |
| 15:00 | Scoring by quarter: 26–17, 16–15, 26–15, 22–23 |
| | Pts: Dias, Jackson 22; Rebs: Márcio 9 Asts: Georginho 9 | Boxscore | Pts: Cole 17; Rebs: Amin 9 Asts: Amin 5 | Referees: Omar Bermúdez (MEX), Amy Bonner (USA), Péter Praksch (HUN) |

==== Third place game ====
| 24 September 2023 | Al Ahly (Egypt) | 74–81 | (China) Zhejiang Golden Bulls | Singapore Indoor Stadium, Singapore |
| 15:00 | Scoring by quarter: 22–12, 16–25, 15–22, 21–22 |
| | Pts: Amin, Oraby 14; Rebs: Fakuade, Oraby 11; Asts: Amin 4 | Boxscore | Pts: Perry 23; Rebs: Perry 12; Asts: Gulley 7 | Referees: Omar Bermúdez (MEX), Yevgeniy Mikheyev (KAZ), Péter Praksch (HUN) |

=== Arab Club Championship ===
All games were played in Doha, Qatar.

==== Group phase ====
| Gameday | Date | | Opponents | H / A | Result | Record |
|---|---|---|---|---|---|---|
| 1 | 1 October 2023 | (Iraq) | Dijlah University College | N | W 92–77 | 1–0 |
| 2 | 2 October 2023 | (Libya) | Al Ittihad Tripoli | N | W 55–65 | 2–0 |
| 3 | 3 October 2023 | (Algeria) | USM Alger | N | L 83–54 | 2–1 |
| 4 | 4 October 2023 | (Morocco) | MTB Majd Tanger | N | W 85–71 | 3–1 |

==== Knock-out phase ====
===== Round of 16 =====
| October 8, 2023 | Al Ahly (Egypt) | 98–58 | (Saudi Arabia) Al-Fateh | Doha, Qatar |
| 19:30 | Scoring by quarter: 19-12, 22-12, 31-19, 26-15 |
| | Pts: Mostafa Kejo 18; Rebs: Seif Samir 9 Asts: Omar Abada 6 | Boxscore | Pts: Darko Planinić 20; Rebs: Hani Al-Mohammed 7 Asts: Mohammed Fahad 5 |

===== Quarter-finals =====
| October 9, 2023 | Al Ittihad Alexandria (Egypt) | 77–82 | (Egypt) Al Ahly | Doha, Qatar |
| 19:30 | Scoring by quarter: 18-19, 17-24, 19-17, 23-22 |
| | | Boxscore |

===== Semi-finals =====
| October 11, 2023 | Al Ahly (Egypt) | 78–85 | (Morocco) AS Salé | Doha, Qatar |
| 17:30 | Scoring by quarter: 25-17, 17-19, 13-19, 23-30 |
| | Pts: Two players 15; Rebs: Three players 7 Asts: Two players 3 | Boxscore | Pts: Ramon Galloway 31; Rebs: Chris Crawford 11; Asts: Two players 2 |

===== Third place game =====
| October 12, 2023 | Kuwait | 87–84 | (Egypt) Al Ahly | Doha, Qatar |
| 15:00 | Scoring by quarter: -, -, -, - |
| | Pts: Cady Lalanne 34; Rebs: Cady Lalanne 10; Asts: Marcus Georges-Hunt 4 | Boxscore | Pts: Omar Oraby 25; Rebs: Omar Oraby 11; Asts: Omar Abada 5 |

=== Basketball Africa League ===
==== Nile Conference ====
| Pos | Team | Pld | W | L | PF | PA | PD | PCT | Qualification |
|---|---|---|---|---|---|---|---|---|---|
| 1 | (Egypt) Al Ahly (H) | 6 | 5 | 1 | 544 | 470 | +74 | .833 | Advance to playoffs |
| 2 | (Libya) Al Ahly Ly | 6 | 3 | 3 | 537 | 498 | +39 | .500 (Note: Head-to-head: Al Ahly Ly and Bangui SC were tied 1–1 in their games, +19 point differential for Al Ahly Ly over these two games.) | Advance to playoffs |
| 3 | (Central African Republic) Bangui SC | 6 | 3 | 3 | 509 | 529 | −20 | .500 | |
| 4 | (Uganda) City Oilers | 6 | 1 | 5 | 468 | 561 | −93 | .167 | |

Source: BAL
Rules for classification: Tiebreakers
(H) Hosts
Notes:

| 19 April 2024 1 | Al Ahly (Egyptian Basketball Federation) | 99–76 | (Uganda Basketball Association) City Oilers | Hassan Moustafa Sports Hall, 6th of October |
| 7:00 PM | Scoring by quarter: 28–16, 25–19, 26–21, 20–20 |
| | Pts: Amin 16; Rebs: Mitchell 8 Asts: Amin, Elgizawy 5 | Livestats | Pts: Rembert 21; Rebs: Maluach 8 Asts: Rembert 6 | Attendance: 2,027; Referees: Kladji Mulla, Mbaye Seye, Silver Houngbedji |

| 20 April 2024 2 | Al Ahly (Egyptian Basketball Federation) | 98–88 | (Libyan Arab Basketball Federation) Al Ahly Ly | Hassan Moustafa Sports Hall, 6th of October |
| 7:00 PM | Scoring by quarter: 20–21, 22–18, 27–19, 29–28 |
| | Pts: Lyons 20; Rebs: Three players 6 Asts: Gendy 5 | Livestats | Pts: Jackson 26; Rebs: Lual-Acuil 9 Asts: Diabate, Jackson 5 | Attendance: 2,115; Referees: Kenneth Gardner, Jean Sauveur Ruhamiriza, Amir Taboubi |

| 22 April 2024 3 | Bangui SC (Fédération Centrafricaine de Basketball) | 79–85 | (Egyptian Basketball Federation) Al Ahly | Hassan Moustafa Sports Hall, 6th of October |
| 7:00 PM | Scoring by quarter: 18–21, 20–22, 19–20, 22–22 |
| | Pts: Fula Nganga 27; Rebs: Darlan 14; Asts: Darlan, Nwabuzor 3 | Livestats | Pts: Three players 14; Rebs: Mitchell 7 Asts: Lyons, Mitchell 3 | Attendance: 1,895; Referees: Kaz Beverly, Jean Sauveur Ruhamiriza, Annie Joyce Muchenu |

| 24 April 2024 4 | City Oilers (Uganda Basketball Association) | 82–81 | (Egyptian Basketball Federation) Al Ahly | Hassan Moustafa Sports Hall, 6th of October |
| 7:00 PM | Scoring by quarter: 23–21, 15–14, 18–19, 26–17 |
| | Pts: Maluach 27; Rebs: Maluach 16; Asts: Miller Jr. 4 | Livestats | Pts: Gardner 19; Rebs: Amin, Gardner 8 Asts: Lyons, Mitchell 4 | Attendance: 2,589; Referees: Kenneth Gardner, Claudio Eiuba, Silver Hongbedji |

| 26 April 2024 5 | Al Ahly Ly (Libyan Arab Basketball Federation) | 76–87 | (Egyptian Basketball Federation) Al Ahly | Hassan Moustafa Sports Hall, 6th of October |
| 7:00 PM | Scoring by quarter: 21–25, 24–17, 18–27, 13–18 |
| | Pts: Lual-Acuil 26; Rebs: Lual-Acuil 15; Asts: Jackson 10 | Livestats | Pts: Mitchell 16; Rebs: Amin, Oraby 9 Asts: Lyons 7 | Attendance: Kladji Mulla, Mbaye Seye, Amir Taboubi; Referees: 2,730 |

| 27 April 2024 6 | Al Ahly (Egyptian Basketball Federation) | 94–71 | (Central African Republic) Bangui SC | Hassan Moustafa Sports Hall, 6th of October |
| 7:00 PM | Scoring by quarter: 28–15, 25–17, 21–21, 20–18 |
| | Pts: Ali 13; Rebs: Gardner 7 Asts: Three players 6 | Livestats | Pts: Wegscheider 16; Rebs: Djimbaraye 11; Asts: Wegscheider 4 | Attendance: 3,003; Referees: Kelsey Reynolds, Jean Sauveur Ruhamiriza, Silver Houngbedji |

==== Playoffs ====
===== Seeding game (1st–2nd seed) =====
| 24 May 2024 | Al Ahly (Egypt) | 78–89 | (Morocco) FUS Rabat | BK Arena, Kigali, Rwanda |
| 8:00 PM | Scoring by quarter: 19–22, 30–19, 15–17, 14–31 |
| | Pts: Lyons 21; Rebs: Mitchell 9 Asts: Gendy 5 | Livestats | Pts: Diarra 21; Rebs: Diarra 10; Asts: Brown 5 | Attendance: 7,154; Referees: Julian Scott, Yann Vezo Davidson, Jean Sauveur Ruhamiriza |

===== Quarterfinals =====
| 26 May 2024 | Al Ahly (Egypt) | 77–86 | (Libya) Al Ahly Ly | BK Arena, Kigali, Rwanda |
| 2:30 PM | Scoring by quarter: 14–15, 22–23, 13–17, 28–31 |
| | Pts: Mitchell 17; Rebs: Oraby 6 Asts: Lyons 10 | Livestats | Pts: Deng 25; Rebs: Lual-Acuil 11; Asts: Golden 10 | Attendance: 2,775; Referees: Julian Scott, Jean Sauveur Ruhamiriza, Amir Taboubi |

=== Egyptian Cup ===
| 31 March 2024 Quarterfinal | Army | 47–81 | Al Ahly | Cairo |

| 30 April 2024 Semifinal | Al Ahly | 67–66 | Gezira | 6th of October |
| | | | | Arena: Hassan Moustafa Sports Hall |

| 2 May 2024 Final | Al Ahly | 65–68 | Al Ittihad Alexandria | 6th of October |
| 9:00 PM (GMT) | Scoring by quarter: 14–19, 16–18, 17–17, 20–14 |
| | Pts: Gendy 26; Rebs: Kejo 17; Asts: Three players 3 | Boxscore | Pts: Metwaly 20; Rebs: Kamal, Mahmoud 8 Asts: Dixon 7 | Arena: Hassan Moustafa Sports Hall |

=== Egyptian Super Cup ===
| 20 October 2023 | Al Ahly | 64–60 | Zamalek | Isa Town, Bahrain |
| | | | | Arena: Khalifa Sports City Stadium |

== Player statistics ==
Legend
| GP | Games played | GS | Games started | MPG | Minutes per game |
| FG% | Field-goal percentage | 3P% | 3-point field-goal percentage | FT% | Free-throw percentage |
| RPG | Rebounds per game | APG | Assists per game | SPG | Steals per game |
| BPG | Blocks per game | PPG | Points per game |

After all games.

=== BAL ===
Al Ahly statistics
| Player | GP | MPG | FG% | 3FG% | FT% | RPG | APG | SPG | BPG | PPG |
|---|---|---|---|---|---|---|---|---|---|---|
| Omar Oraby | 8 | 18.8 | .612 | .000 | .524 | 5.5 | 0.8 | 0.0 | 1.9 | 8.9 |
| Tony Mitchell | 8 | 26.2 | .402 | .295 | .737 | 6.0 | 3.0 | 1.6 | 1.1 | 11.6 |
| Moustafa Kejo | 8 | 15.2 | .615 | .500 | .333 | 5.8 | 0.5 | 0.3 | 0.4 | 4.5 |
| Seifeldin Hendawy | 3 | 4.2 | .000 | .000 | .500 | 0.3 | 0.0 | 0.0 | 0.3 | 0.3 |
| Mohamed Abdelkawy | 8 | 16.3 | .375 | .429 | .417 | 1.8 | 0.9 | 0.1 | 0.3 | 3.3 |
| Prince Ali | 8 | 16.4 | .444 | .450 | .800 | 2.1 | 0.5 | 0.0 | 0.3 | 7.1 |
| Ehab Amin | 8 | 24.0 | .411 | .339 | .615 | 5.6 | 3.1 | 1.5 | 0.1 | 13.1 |
| Patrick Gardner | 8 | 18.0 | .507 | .345 | .857 | 4.6 | 0.9 | 0.8 | 0.1 | 10.5 |
| Amro Abdelhalim | 8 | 17.1 | .435 | .280 | .636 | 2.4 | 3.0 | 0.1 | 0.1 | 8.5 |
| Mark Lyons | 8 | 24.5 | .407 | .333 | .684 | 2.1 | 5.3 | 2.1 | 0.0 | 12.6 |
| Marwan Sarhan | 3 | 8.2 | .286 | .000 | .750 | 2.0 | 0.0 | 0.0 | 0.0 | 2.3 |
| Karim Elgizawy | 7 | 15.0 | .333 | .500 | .750 | 2.0 | 1.9 | 0.4 | 0.0 | 3.1 |
| Ahmed Moheib | 1 | 15.5 | .500 | .200 | .000 | 2.0 | 0.0 | 0.0 | 0.0 | 9.0 |
| Mohamed Elmaraghy | 2 | 10.1 | .636 | .333 | 1.000 | 0.5 | 0.0 | 0.0 | 0.0 | 8.0 |
| Seif Samir | 1 | 8.9 | .333 | .000 | .500 | 0.0 | 1.0 | 1.0 | 0.0 | 3.0 |
