= 2023 FIBA Intercontinental Cup (September) squads =

Below is a list of the squads for the 2023 FIBA Intercontinental Cup (Singapore), which is held from 21 to 24 September 2023. Each team had to name a 12-man squad for the tournament.

== Al Ahly ==
Head coach: (Spain) Augustí Julbe

Note: Flags indicate national team, as has been defined under FIBA eligibility rules. Players may hold more than one non-FIBA nationality.

| No. | Pos. | Nat. | Player |
|---|---|---|---|
| 4 | G | (Egypt) EGY | Ehab Amin |
| 6 | PF | (Egypt) EGY | Marwan Sarhan |
| 7 | G | (Egypt) EGY | Amr Zahran |
| 11 | G | (United States) USA | Norris Cole |
| 12 | G | (Tunisia) TUN | Omar Abada |
| 15 | SG | (Egypt) EGY | Moamen Khairy |
| 13 | PF | (Egypt) EGY | Amr Gendy |
| 28 | PF | (Nigeria) NGA | Michael Fakuade |
| 14 | C | (Egypt) EGY | Mostafa Kejo |
| 23 | PG | (Egypt) EGY | Mohamed Nasr |
| 24 | SF | (Egypt) EGY | Ahmed Moheib |
| 42 | PF | (Egypt) EGY | Seif Samir |
| 45 | SF | (Egypt) EGY | Youssef Maadawy |
| 50 | C | (Egypt) EGY | Omar Oraby |

== Al Manama ==
Head coach: (Cyprus) Linos Gavriel

Note: Flags indicate national team, as has been defined under FIBA eligibility rules. Players may hold more than one non-FIBA nationality.

| No. | Pos. | Nat. | Player |
|---|---|---|---|
| 0 | G | (Bahrain) BHR | Yusuf Almarbati |
| 2 | PG | (Bahrain) BHR | Husain Shaker |
| 3 | PG | (Bahrain) BHR | Ahmed Haji |
| 5 | G | (Bahrain) BHR | Emran Ali |
| 10 | PF | (Bahrain) BHR | Mohammed Hamooda |
| 12 | C | (Bahrain) BHR | Ahmed Najaf |
| 14 | G | (Bahrain) BHR | Hassan Nowrooz |
| 15 | G | (United States) USA | Sir'Dominic Pointer |
| 22 | PF | (United States) USA | Latavious Williams |
| 23 | G | (Bahrain) BHR | Ali Rashed |
| 25 | C | (United States) USA | Travin Thibodeaux |
| 73 | G | (Bahrain) BHR | Mosti Rashed |

== NBA G League Ignite ==
Head coach: (United States) Jason Hart

Note: Flags indicate national team, as has been defined under FIBA eligibility rules. Players may hold more than one non-FIBA nationality.

| No. | Pos. | Nat. | Player |
|---|---|---|---|
| 0 | F | (United States) USA | Ron Holland |
| 2 | G | (United States) USA | London Johnson |
| 3 | SG | (United States) USA | Admon Gilder |
| 4 | F | (Senegal) SEN | Babacar Sané |
| 5 | PG | (United States) USA | David Stockton |
| 8 | G | (United States) USA | Jeremy Pargo |
| 11 | F | (United States) USA | Tyler Smith |
| 12 | C | (United States) USA | Eric Mika |
| 13 | SG | (Lithuania) LTU | Matas Buzelis |
| 23 | G | (United States) USA | John Jenkins |
| 33 | PF | (Spain) ESP | Izan Almansa |

== Sesi/Franca ==
Head coach: (Brazil) Helinho

Note: Flags indicate national team, as has been defined under FIBA eligibility rules. Players may hold more than one non-FIBA nationality.

| No. | Pos. | Nat. | Player |
|---|---|---|---|
| 3 | C | (Brazil) BRA | Márcio |
| 4 | PG | (Brazil) BRA | Alexei Borges |
| 6 | G | (Argentina) ARG | Santiago Scala |
| 7 | SF | (Brazil) BRA | Jhonatan Luz |
| 9 | PF | (Brazil) BRA | Lucas Dias |
| 11 | PF | (Brazil) BRA | Eduardo Elevi |
| 14 | F | (Brazil) BRA | Georginho |
| 21 | PF | (Brazil) BRA | Wesley Ferreira |
| 32 | SF | (United States) USA | David Jackson |
| 43 | PF | (Brazil) BRA | Nathan |
| 58 | G | (Brazil) BRA | Paulo Barbosa |

== Telekom Baskets Bonn ==
Head coach: (Belgium) Roel Moors

Note: Flags indicate national team, as has been defined under FIBA eligibility rules. Players may hold more than one non-FIBA nationality.

| No. | Pos. | Nat. | Player |
|---|---|---|---|
| 0 | PG | (Germany) GER | Tyreese Blunt |
| 1 | F | (United States) USA | Savion Flagg |
| 2 | SF | (Germany) GER | Sam Griesel |
| 3 | PF | (United States) USA | Ike Udanoh |
| 4 | G | (United States) USA | Glynn Watson Jr. |
| 5 | G | (Norway) NOR | Harald Frey |
| 11 | G | (United States) USA | Brian Fobbs |
| 13 | C | (Croatia) CRO | Leon Bulić |
| 19 | PF | (Germany) GER | Till Pape |
| 22 | F | (United States) USA | Noah Kirkwood |
| 43 | PF | (Germany) GER | Christian Sengfelder |
| 44 | C | (Germany) GER | Benedikt Turudic |
| 54 | C | (Canada) CAN | Thomas Kennedy |
| - | PG | (United States) USA | Pascal Gediga |
| - | SF | (Germany) GER | Florian Koch |

== Zhejiang Golden Bulls ==
Head coach: (China) Liu Weiwei

Note: Flags indicate national team, as has been defined under FIBA eligibility rules. Players may hold more than one non-FIBA nationality.

| No. | Pos. | Nat. | Player |
|---|---|---|---|
| 1 | SF | (China) CHN | Liu Yiting |
| 2 | PF | (United States) USA | Reggie Perry |
| 4 | PG | (China) CHN | Ren Junzhe |
| 5 | SG | (China) CHN | Lin Xiaotian |
| 8 | SG | (China) CHN | Lu Wenbo |
| 12 | SG | (United States) USA | Jarmar Gulley |
| 13 | F | (China) CHN | Zhang Hongshuo |
| 15 | G | (China) CHN | Wang Yibo |
| 14 | G | (United States) USA | Malik Newman |
| 20 | SF | (China) CHN | Zhou Yishan |
| 25 | F | (China) CHN | Wang Zilu |
| 33 | G | (China) CHN | Wu Qian |
| - | C | (China) CHN | Sun Haomiao |
