= 2022–23 Al Ahly men's basketball season =

93rd season of Al Ahly men's basketball team

Al Ahly
2022–23 season
- BAL champions
- Egyptian Premier League champions
- Egyptian Cup champions
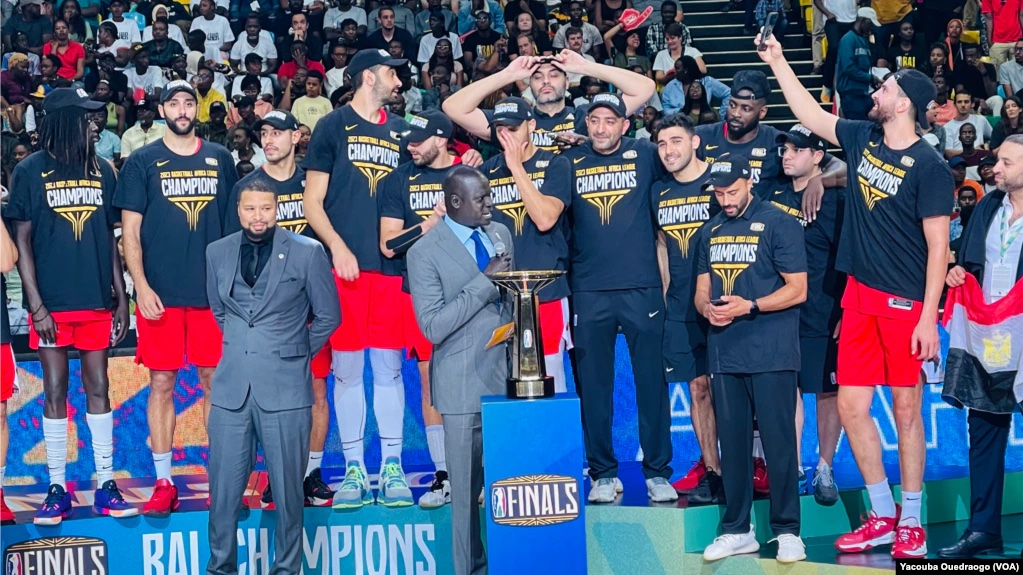
- Al Ahly hosting the BAL championship trophy after winning the final
- Chairman: Mahmoud El Khatib
- Head coach: Augustí Julbe
- Hosny Elgarhy: Hosny Elgarhy
- Premier League: Champions
- BAL: Champions
- Egyptian Cup: Winners
- Arab Championship: Fourth place
- Biggest win: 77 points Al Ahly 130–57 Al Minae (5 October 2022)
- Biggest defeat: 21 points Al Ahly 45–66 Al Ittihad (24 December 2023)

The 2022–23 season Al Ahly men's basketball season was the 93rd season of Al Ahly's men's basketball team. This season, the Reds made their debut in the Basketball Africa League (BAL), and won their second continental title.

In the second year under Spanish head coach Augustí Julbe, who extended his contract for two more years in July. Al Ahly won the treble consisting of the BAL championship, the Egyptian Premier League and Egyptian Cup. On 19 April, Al Ahly won the Egyptian Cup. On 15 May, Al Ahly won their second consecutive Premier League title, after beating Al Ittihad in the finals of the playoffs. Their BAL championship was won on 27 May 2023, following a win over AS Douanes in the final.

== Roster ==
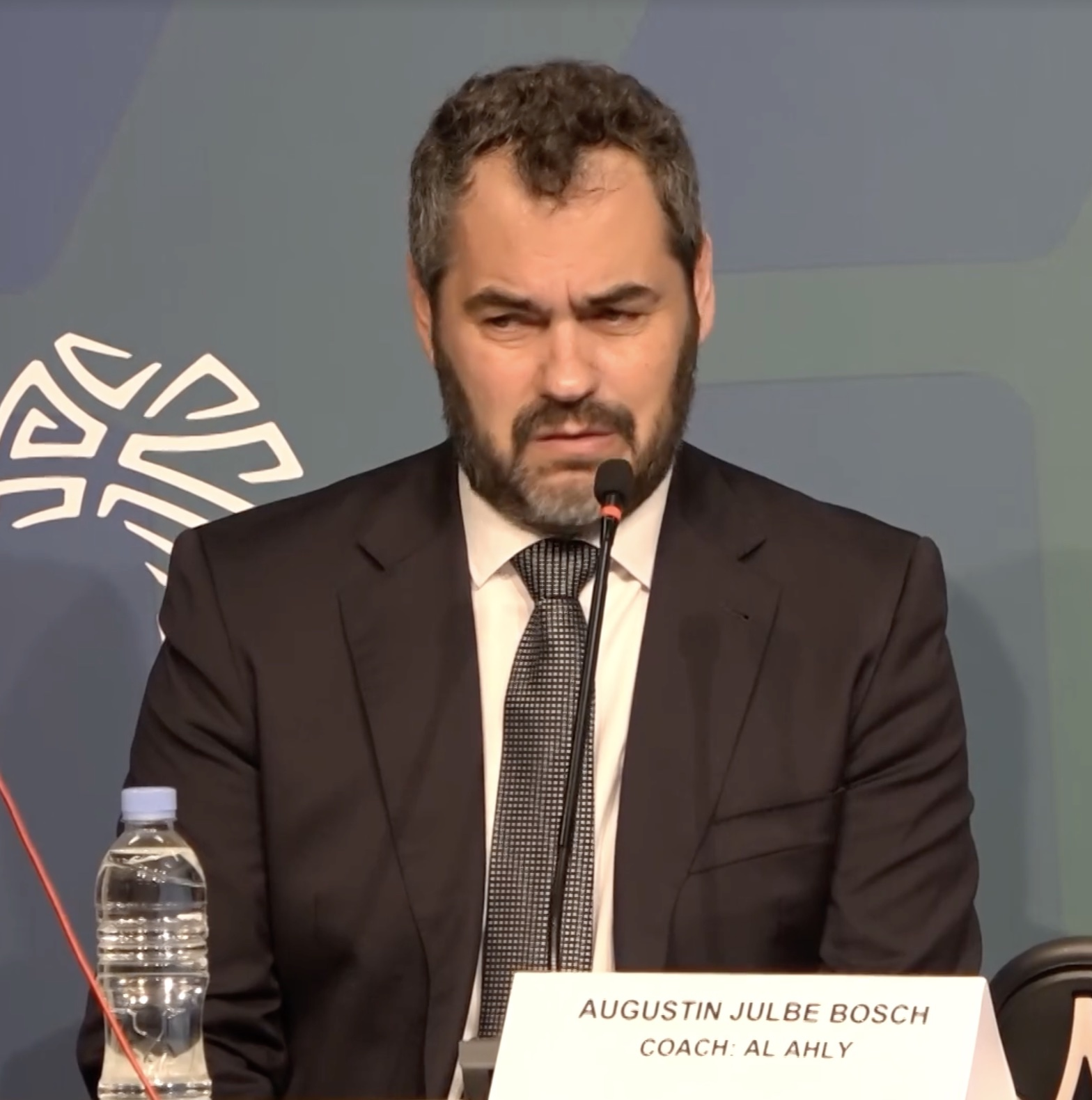
The season was Augustí Julbe's second year as head coach for Al Ahly

The following was Al Ahly's 2022–23 roster for the BAL. The four import players, Nuni Omot, Michael Fakuade, Corey Webster and Michael Thompson, only played in BAL games.

Al Ahly roster
Players
Coaches

Pos.	No.	Nat.	Name	Ht.	Age
PG	2	(United States)	Thompson, Michael (I)	1.77 m (5 ft 10 in)	37 – 9 February 1989
PF	4	(Egypt)	Sarhan, Marwan	2.03 m (6 ft 8 in)	34 – 2 May 1992
F	6	(Egypt)	Gendy, Amr	1.93 m (6 ft 4 in)	35 – 14 June 1991
F	7	(South Sudan)	Omot, Nuni (I)	2.06 m (6 ft 9 in)	32 – 3 October 1994
PF	10	(Mali)	Camara, Dramane (E)	1.95 m (6 ft 5 in)	22 – 24 January 2004
G	12	(Egypt)	Azab, Omar	1.91 m (6 ft 3 in)	28 – 5 April 1998
PG	13	(Egypt)	Tarek, Moamen	1.90 m (6 ft 3 in)	23 – 1 January 2003
SF	14	(Egypt)	Zahran, Amr	1.91 m (6 ft 3 in)	25 – 6 October 2001
SG	15	(New Zealand)	Webster, Corey (I)	1.88 m (6 ft 2 in)	37 – 29 November 1988
SF	23	(Egypt)	Aboelnasr, Mohamed	1.90 m (6 ft 3 in)	35 – 15 August 1991
C	24	(Egypt)	Samir, Seif (C)	2.03 m (6 ft 8 in)	33 – 5 June 1993
PF	28	(Nigeria)	Fakuade, Michael (I)	2.01 m (6 ft 7 in)	37 – 18 February 1989
C	34	(Egypt)	Ismail, Ahmed	2.08 m (6 ft 10 in)	31 – 21 January 1995
C	41	(Egypt)	Oraby, Omar	2.18 m (7 ft 2 in)	35 – 8 September 1991
G	45	(Egypt)	Amin, Ehab	1.85 m (6 ft 1 in)	31 – 1 August 1995

Head coach

- (Spain) Augustí Julbe

Assistant coach(es)

- (Egypt) Ahmed Elgarhi
- (Egypt) Ramy Abousamra

Legend

- (C) Team captain
- Injured

- Roster
Updated: September 25, 2023

== Transactions ==
=== In ===
No.	Pos.	Nat.	Name	Age	Moving from		Type	Ends	Date	Source
10	PF	(Mali)	Dramane Camara	18	NBA Academy Africa	(Senegal)	Drafted	May 2023 (BAL only)	March 2023	
7	F	(South Sudan)	Nuni Omot	27	Lakeland Magic	(United States)	Free agent	2023	April 2023	
15	G	(New Zealand)	Corey Webster	33	Mornar Bar	(Montenegro)	Free agent	May 2023 (BAL only)	April 2023	
2	G	(United States)	Michael Thompson	33	None		Free agent	May 2023 (BAL only)	April 2023	
28	F/C	(Nigeria)	Michael Fakuade	33	Kagoshima Rebnise	(Japan)	Free agent	May 2023 (BAL only)	May 2023	

== Competitions ==
=== Overview ===
Competition	First match	Last match	Starting round	Final position	Record							
Competition	First match	Last match	Starting round	Final position	Pld	W	D	L	PF	PA	PD	Win %
BAL	26 April 2023	27 May 2023	Nile Conference	Winners	8	7	0	1	677	594	+83	87.50
Egyptian Premier League	30 December 2022	15 May 2023	Regular season	Winners	24	22	0	2	1,776	1,456	+320	91.67
Egyptian Cup	8 December 2022	19 April 2023	Round of 16	Winners	4	4	0	0	320	220	+100	100.00
Egyptian Super Cup	24 December 2022			Runner-up	1	0	0	1	45	66	−21	0.00
Arab Championship	5 October 2022	15 October 2022	Group phase	Runner-up	7	6	0	1	638	593	+45	85.71
Total					44	39	0	5	3,456	2,929	+527	88.64

Source: Goalzz

=== Egyptian Premier League ===
==== Regular season ====
===== Standings =====
Pos	Standings						
Pos	Team	Pld	W	L	PF	PA	PD
1	Al Ittihad Alexandria	14	13	1	1171	892	279
2	Al Ahly	14	13	1	1133	869	264
3	Zamalek	14	9	5	1081	1044	37
4	Gezira	14	7	7	1025	1018	7
5	Smouha	14	5	9	968	1013	–45
6	El Gaish Army	14	5	9	979	1102	–123
7	Telecom Egypt	14	3	11	966	1090	–124
8	Egypt Insurance	14	1	13	812	1107	–295

===== Games =====
Gameday	Date	Opponents	H / A	Result	Record
1	30 December 2022	El Gaish Army	H	W 74–61	1–0
2	2 January 2023	Telecom Egypt	A	W 57–85	2–0
3	5 January 2023	Egypt Insurance	H	W 78–53	3–0
4	9 January 2023	Smouha	H	W 81–59	4–0
5	13 January 2023	Zamalek	A	W 65–92	5–0
6	16 January 2023	Gezira	A	W 67–83	6–0
7	20 January 2023	Al Ittihad Alexandria	H	W 77–72	7–0
8	23 January 2023	El Gaish Army	A	W 80–103	8–0
9	27 January 2023	Telecom Egypt	A	W 75–96	9–0
10	30 January 2023	Egypt Insurance	A	W 51–79	10–0
11	3 February 2023	Smouha	A	W 54–74	11–0
12	6 March 2023	Zamalek	H	W 74–59	12–0
13	10 March 2023	Gezira	H	W 80–67	13–0
14	13 March 2023	Al Ittihad Alexandria	A	L 80–69	13–1

==== Playoffs ====
===== Quarterfinals =====
Gameday	Date	Opponents	H / A	Result	Record
1	25 March 2023	Telecom Egypt	H	W 106–62	1–0
2	26 March 2023	Telecom Egypt	H	W 88–76	2–0
3	29 March 2023	Telecom Egypt	A	W 60–95	3–0

===== Semifinals =====
Gameday	Date	Opponents	H / A	Result	Record
1	6 April 2023	Zamalek	H	W 71–62	1–0
2	8 April 2023	Zamalek	H	W 79–48	2–0
3	10 April 2023	Zamalek	A	W 57–91	3–0

===== Finals =====
Gameday	Date	Opponents	H / A	Result	Record
1	10 May 2023	Al Ittihad Alexandria	A	W 62–69	1–0
2	11 May 2023	Al Ittihad Alexandria	A	L 80–62	1–1
3	13 May 2023	Al Ittihad Alexandria	H	W 67–58	2–1
4	15 May 2023	Al Ittihad Alexandria	H	W 72–70	3–1

=== Egyptian Cup ===
Round	Date	Opponents	H / A	Result	Record
Round of 16	8 December 2022	Heliopolis Sporting Club	H	W 69–55	1–0
Quarter-finals	12 December 2022	Smouha	H	W 91–48	2–0
Semi-finals	17 April 2023	Gezira	H	W 88–52	3–0
Finals	19 April 2023	Zamalek	N	W 72–65	4–0

=== Egyptian Super Cup ===
Date	Opponents	H / A	Result
24 December 2022	Al Ittihad Alexandria	N	L 45–66

=== Basketball Africa League ===
==== Nile Conference ====
26 April 2023	Al Ahly (Egypt)	92–73	(Mozambique) Ferroviário da Beira	Hassan Moustafa Sports Hall, 6th of October
18:00	Scoring by quarter: 32–15, 21–19, 23–24, 16–16
	Pts: Omot 21; Rebs: Oraby 6 Asts: Webster 9	BAL Report; RealGM Report	Pts: Perry 19; Rebs: Three players 7 Asts: Perry 5	Attendance: 1,159

29 April 2023	City Oilers (Uganda)	70–72	(Egypt) Al Ahly	Hassan Moustafa Sports Hall, 6th of October
19:30	Scoring by quarter: 14–20, 13–20, 9–21, 34–11
	Pts: Roebuck Jr. 28; Rebs: Roebuck Jr. 11; Asts: Enabu 4	Livestats	Pts: Omot 17; Rebs: Oraby 10; Asts: Tarek 5	Attendance: 1,372; Referees: Catherine Chang, Kingsley Ojeaburu, Walelign Fikadu Gebeto

2 May 2023	Cape Town Tigers (South Africa)	75–91	(Egypt) Al Ahly	Hassan Moustafa Sports Hall, 6th of October
20:30	Scoring by quarter: 20–30, 22–16, 14–18, 19–17
	Pts: Ganapamo 26; Rebs: Cele 6 Asts: Ganapamo, Gbinije 5	BAL Report	Pts: Omot 28; Rebs: Omot 5 Asts: Amin 8	Attendance: 2,050; Referees: Ian McClenny, Jean Sauveur Ruhamiriza, Hassan Kamate

5 May 2023	Petro de Luanda (Angola)	91–90	(Egypt) Al Ahly	Hassan Moustafa Sports Hall, 6th of October
19:30	Scoring by quarter: 26–18, 21–25, 24–26, 20–21
	Pts: Morais 34; Rebs: Morais 6 Asts: Majok 5	BAL Report	Pts: Omot 25; Rebs: Ismail 7 Asts: Webster 8	Attendance: 3,015; Referees: Tyler Ricks, Mbaye Seye, Annie Joyce Muchenu

6 May 2023	Al Ahly (Egypt)	80–70	(Guinea) SLAC	Hassan Moustafa Sports Hall, 6th of October
19:30	Scoring by quarter: 19–18, 19–25, 31–8, 11–19
	Pts: Oraby 20; Rebs: Ismail 9 Asts: Thompson 6	Livestats	Pts: Nwabuzor 19; Rebs: Conde 7 Asts: Nwabuzor 4	Attendance: 1,623; Referees: Catherine Chang, Kingsley Ojeaburu, Marie Leslie Cherubin

==== Playoffs ====
===== Quarterfinals =====
21 May 2023	Al Ahly (Egypt)	94–77	(Rwanda) REG	BK Arena, Kigali
16:00	Scoring by quarter: 23–18, 23–14, 21–21, 27–24
	Pts: Amin 22; Rebs: Amin, Fakuade 6 Asts: Amin 4	Report; Livestats	Pts: Filer 26; Rebs: Kambuy Manga 6 Asts: Filer 9	Attendance: 6,423; Referees: Marcy Williams, Kalume Tonton Banza, Mbaye Seye

===== Semifinals =====
24 May 2023	Stade Malien (Mali)	73–78	(Egypt) Al Ahly	BK Arena, Kigali
20:30	Scoring by quarter: 17–17, 21–16, 15–25, 20–20
	Pts: Amayo 15; Rebs: Diarra 11; Asts: Foster 6	Livestats	Pts: Amin 21; Rebs: Amin 6 Asts: Thompson 4	Attendance: 6,102; Referees: Klyde Mulla, Jean Sauveur Ruhamiriza, Annie Joyce Muchenu

==== Finals ====
27 May 2023	Al Ahly (Egypt)	80–65	(Senegal) AS Douanes	BK Arena, Kigali
18:00	Scoring by quarter: 17–10, 21–23, 25–13, 17–19
	Pts: Omot 22; Rebs: Fakuade 10; Asts: Seif 4	Livestats	Pts: Boissy 20; Rebs: Ochereobia 9 Asts: Ndour 4	Attendance: 7,532; Referees: JD Ralls, Yann Vezo Davidson, Arnold Moseya

=== Arab Club Championship ===
All games were played in Kuwait City.

==== Group phase ====
5 October 2022	Al Ahly (Egypt)	130–53	(Yemen) Al Minae	Kuwait City
9:00
		Boxscore		Arena: Al-Ittihad Hall

7 October 2022	Al Gharafa (Qatar)	59–108	(Egypt) Al Ahly	Kuwait City
		Boxscore		Arena: Al-Ittihad Hall

8 October 2022	Al Ahly (Egypt)	88–71	(Lebanon) Al Riyadi	Kuwait City
		Boxscore		Arena: Al-Ittihad Hall

==== Knock-out phase ====
===== Round of 16 =====
11 October 2022	Al Ahly Cairo (Egypt)	87–76	(Syria) Al-Ittihad Aleppo	Al-Ittihad Hall, Kuwait City, Kuwait
12:00	Scoring by quarter: 25–17, 17–15, 22–18, 23–22
	Pts: Ehab Amin 11; Rebs: Amin, Ismail 5 Asts: Fakuade, Amin 4	Boxscore	Pts: Brandon Spearman 24; Rebs: Igor Chumakov 9 Asts: Brandon Spearman 6

===== Quarter-finals =====
12 October 2022	Al Ahly Cairo (Egypt)	93–54	(Kuwait) Al-Jahra	Al-Ittihad Hall, Kuwait City, Kuwait
16:55
	Pts: Ahmed Ismail 16; Rebs: Amr Gendy 6 Asts: Marwan Sarhan 6	Boxscore	Pts: Chinemelu Elonu 20; Rebs: Chinemelu Elon 11; Asts: Two players 2

===== Semi-finals =====
14 October 2022	Kazma (Kuwait)	87–91	(Egypt) Al Ahly Cairo	Al-Ittihad Hall, Kuwait City, Kuwait
16:00
	Pts: Kevin Murphy 29; Rebs: Latavious Williams 10; Asts: Ahmad Al-Baloushi 9	Report	Pts: Ehab Amin 31; Rebs: Seif Samir 10; Asts: Amr Gendy 4

===== Final =====
15 October 2022	Kuwait	78–77	(Egypt) Al Ahly Cairo	Al-Ittihad Hall, Kuwait City, Kuwait
18:30
	Pts: Marcus Georges-Hunt 22; Rebs: Lalanne, Adnan 10; Asts: Hamad Adnan 4	Report	Pts: Amr Gendy 18; Rebs: Michael Fakuade 10; Asts: Walter Hodge 5

== Individual awards ==
Date	Player	Award
27 May 2023	Nuni Omot	BAL Most Valuable Player
27 May 2023	Nuni Omot	All-BAL First Team
19 April 2023	Ehab Amin	Egyptian Basketball Premier League MVP Award

== Player statistics ==
Legend
GP	Games played	GS	Games started	MPG	Minutes per game
FG%	Field-goal percentage	3P%	3-point field-goal percentage	FT%	Free-throw percentage
RPG	Rebounds per game	APG	Assists per game	SPG	Steals per game
BPG	Blocks per game	PPG	Points per game

After all games.

=== BAL ===
Al Ahly statistics
Player	GP	MPG	FG%	3FG%	FT%	RPG	APG	SPG	BPG	PPG
Omar Azab	2	3.4	.000	.000	.500	0.0	0.0	0.0	0.0	1.5
Dramane Camara	4	3.7	.250	.250	1.000	0.5	0.5	0.0	0.3	0.5
Amr Gendy	8	11.4	.280	.200	.714	1.9	0.8	0.3	0.0	2.8
Michael Fakuade^{≠}	3	21.3	.474	.286	.667	6.7	2.3	0.3	0.7	8.0
Ehab Amin	7	24.0	.458	.333	.647	4.7	3 .9	1.6	0.1	12.7
Omar Oraby	8	17.9	.737	.000	.667	5.5	0.1	0.4	1.6	8.8
Nuni Omot	8	28.0	.446	.368	.902	3.6	2.1	1.1	0.4	18.9
Seif Samir	7	11.6	.333	.000	.000	0.7	0.7	0.3	0.6	2.1
Marwan Sarhan	4	9.9	.455	.200	.667	0.3	0.8	0.0	0.0	1.5
Mohamed Abdelkawy	8	14.6	.474	.444	.500	2.1	0.5	0.0	0.1	1.3
Amr Zahran	8	18.2	.426	.263	.778	3.5	2.3	1.3	0.1	2.6
Ahmed Ismail	5	18.0	.737	.000	.500	5.8	0.4	0.2	0.0	6.2
Moamen Tarek	3	14.1	.222	.222	1.000	1.0	3.0	0.3	0.0	2.3
Corey Webster	8	19.1	.433	.429	.857	3.1	3.4	0.3	0.0	9.9
Michael Thompson	8	27.5	.431	.310	.852	1.5	4.0	0.9	0.0	10.8

^{≠}Acquired during the season
^{~}Waived during the season
