= Marwan Sarhan =

Egyptian basketball player (born 1992)

Marwan Sarhan مروان سرحان
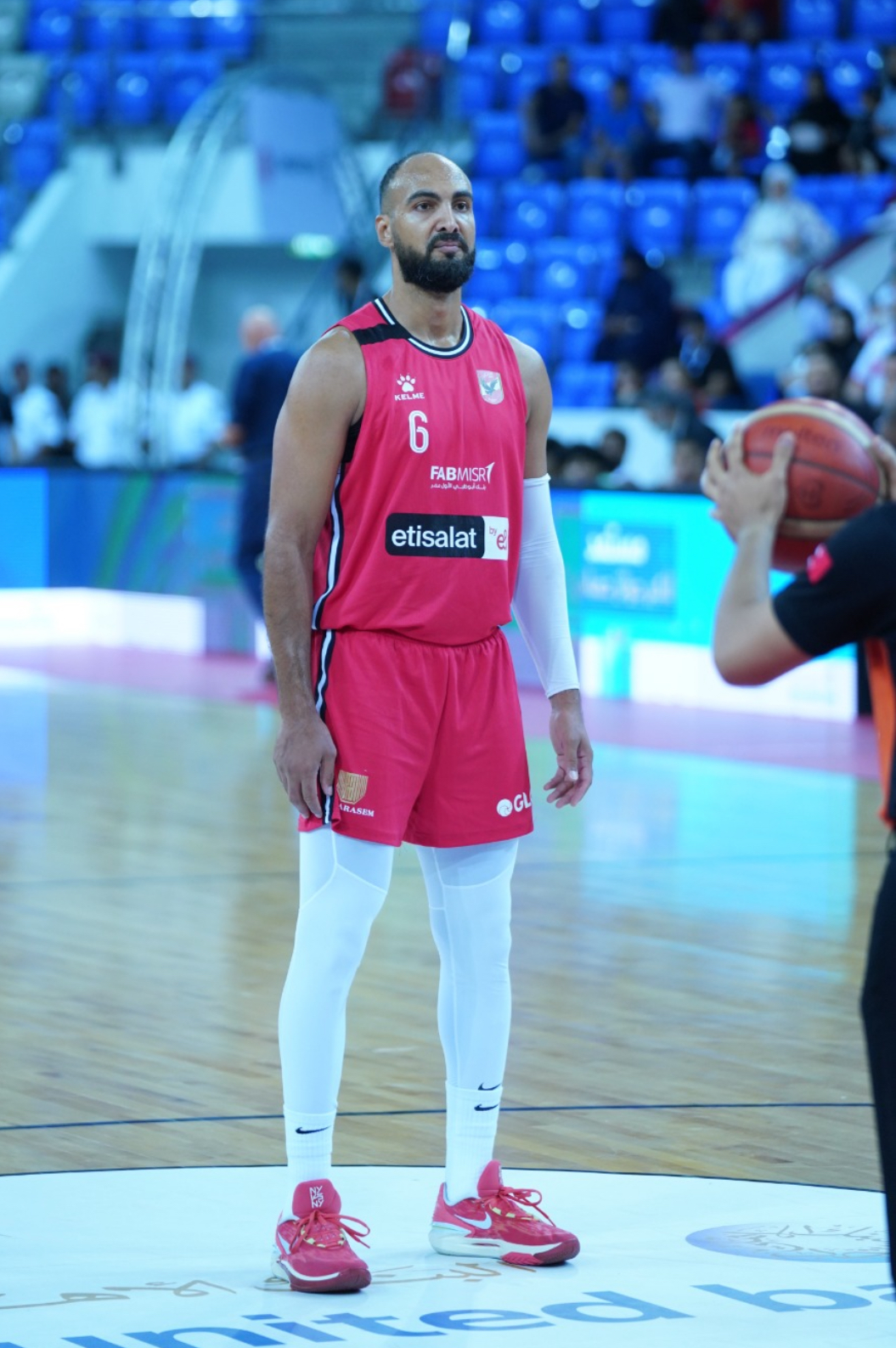
- Sarhan with Al Ahly in 2023

No. 6 – Al Ahly
- Position: Power forward
- League: Egyptian Basketball Premier League; Basketball Africa League

Personal information
- Born: May 2, 1992 (age 34) Alexandria, Egypt
- Listed height: 6 ft 8 in (2.03 m)
- Listed weight: 225 lb (102 kg)

Career information
- College: University of Charleston (2012–2013); Western Oregon University (2013–2015)
- NBA draft: 2015: undrafted
- Playing career: 2008–present

Career history
- 2008–2012: Smouha
- 2015–2021: Smouha
- 2021–present: Al Ahly

Career highlights
- BAL champion (2023); 4× Egyptian Premier League champion (2022, 2023, 2025, 2026); 2× Egyptian Cup winner (2022, 2023); 2x Egyptian Super Cup champion (2023, 2025); Egyptian Super Cup MVP (2023); Arab Club Championship winner (2021); 5× Egyptian Mortabet League champion (2021–2025); Egyptian Mortabet League MVP (2023); 2x Arab Nations Championship winner (2017, 2023)
Medals
Men's basketball
Representing Egypt
FIBA Africa U18 Championship
Gold medal – first place	2010 Egypt

Marwan Mohamed Hassan Youssef Sarhan (in Arabic: مروان سرحان; born May 2, 1992) is an Egyptian professional basketball player for Al Ahly of the Egyptian Basketball Premier League. He played college basketball for Western Oregon Wolves (WOU), and spent his first college season at the University of Charleston NCAA Division II as a sophomore. He plays at the power forward position and stands at 2.03 m (6 ft 8 in).

Sarhan first played for Egyptian side Smouha. He has played for the Egypt national team at both the youth and senior levels, and led the U18 team to a gold medal at the 2010 FIBA U18 AfroBasket. With Al Ahly, he won the BAL championship in 2023, five Egyptian Mortabet League titles (2021, 2022, 2023, 2024, 2025), four Egyptian Premier League titles (2022, 2023, 2025, 2026), two Egyptian Cup titles (2022, 2023), two Egypt Super Cup title (2023, 2025), one Arab Club Competitions title (2021) and one Cairo League title (2021).

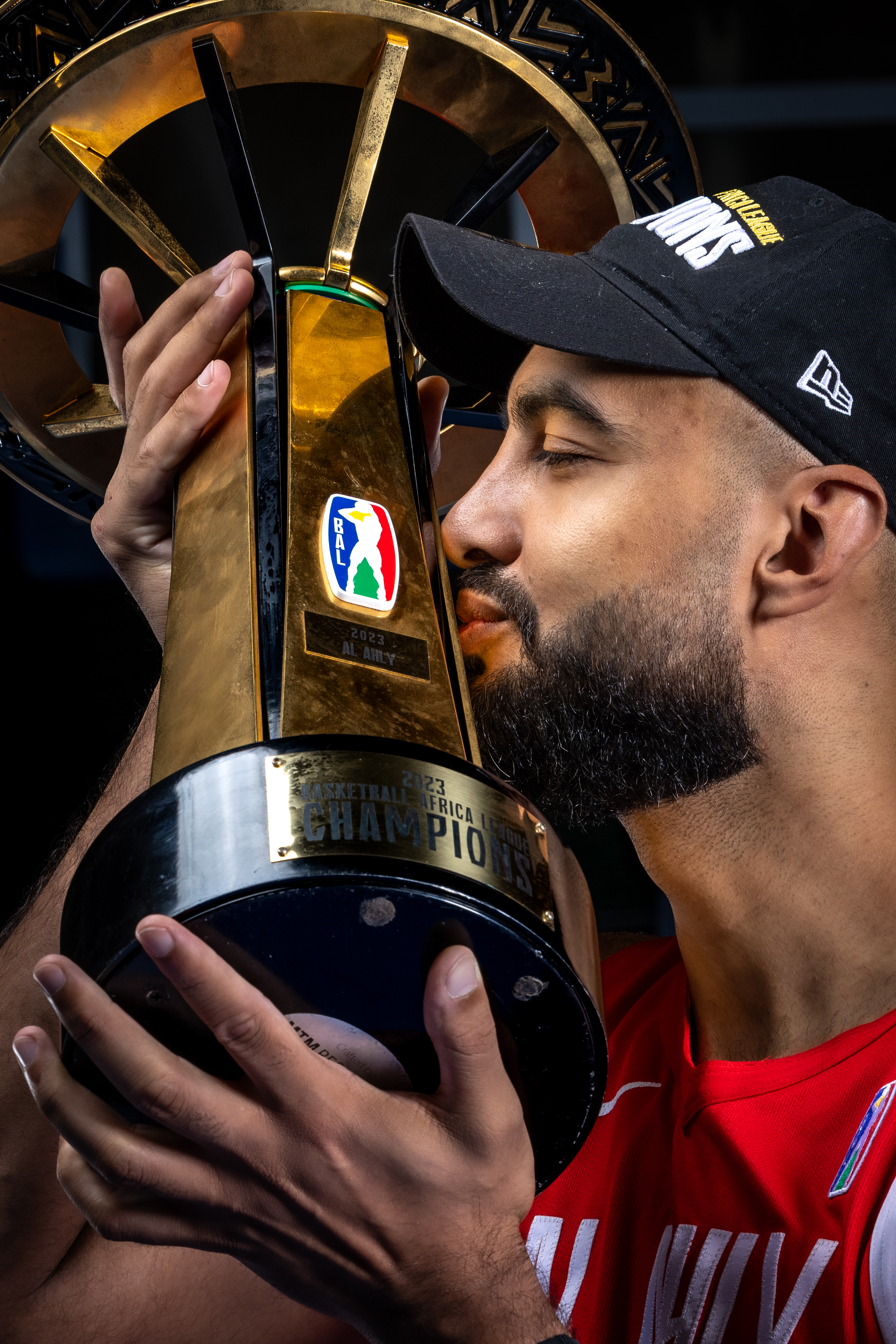
Marwan Sarhan with BAL trophy

== Early life ==
Sarhan was born in Alexandria, Egypt to Mohamed and Azza Sarhan. He has two siblings, a brother named Gasser and a sister named Miran. In his childhood, Sarhan started playing basketball at the age of 6, after his father encouraged both him and his brother to play the sport. He began his career for Smouha SC for which he played 12 years. In 2011, he represented Egypt on the world stage Fiba World Cup U19 in Latvia, and subsequently moved across the Atlantic to begin his college basketball career at the University of Charleston. After one season, Sarhan transferred to Western Oregon University, where he completed his remaining two years of NCAA eligibility.

== Professional career ==
Following graduation from WOU, in 2015, Sarhan was signed to a 1-year contract with Smouha SC. After four seasons with Smouha, Sarhan became the most expensive player in the history of Egyptian basketball, with the club valuing him at £E10 million, at the time of contract negotiation with Zamalek. Sarhan remained in Alexandria at that time, signing an extension to his contract, during which time he led his squad to their first ever international competition medal, bringing home a bronze medal in 2019 at the FIBA Africa Basketball league (ABL), beating JS Kairouan 58–69 in the bronze medal game. Sarhan shined at the ABL especially after knocking Al Ahly out in the quarter finals.

In August 2021, Sarhan signed a four-year contract with Al Ahly of the Egyptian Basketball Premier League, who managed to buy out his contract for £E4 million. For Al Ahly, the decision to pursue Sarhan proved to be correct, as he has been an instrumental player in the 13 championships that team has won in his first four seasons alone. Not only has his contribution brought success on the national level, but, Sarhan was also a part of the squad who represented the continent of Africa at the 2023 FIBA Intercontinental Cup in Singapore. At the opening game of this competition, Al Ahly defeated the NBA G-League Ignite 82–76, becoming the first African club to win a game in the competition's 33-year existence. Al Ahly was sent to fourth place with an 81–74 loss against Zhejiang Golden Bulls. Sarhan boasted a career high at the Arab Championships in Qatar (2023), recording 14 points, and shooting 75% from 3's against Kuwait SC. In April 2024, he made his second appearance with Al Ahly at the BAL4.

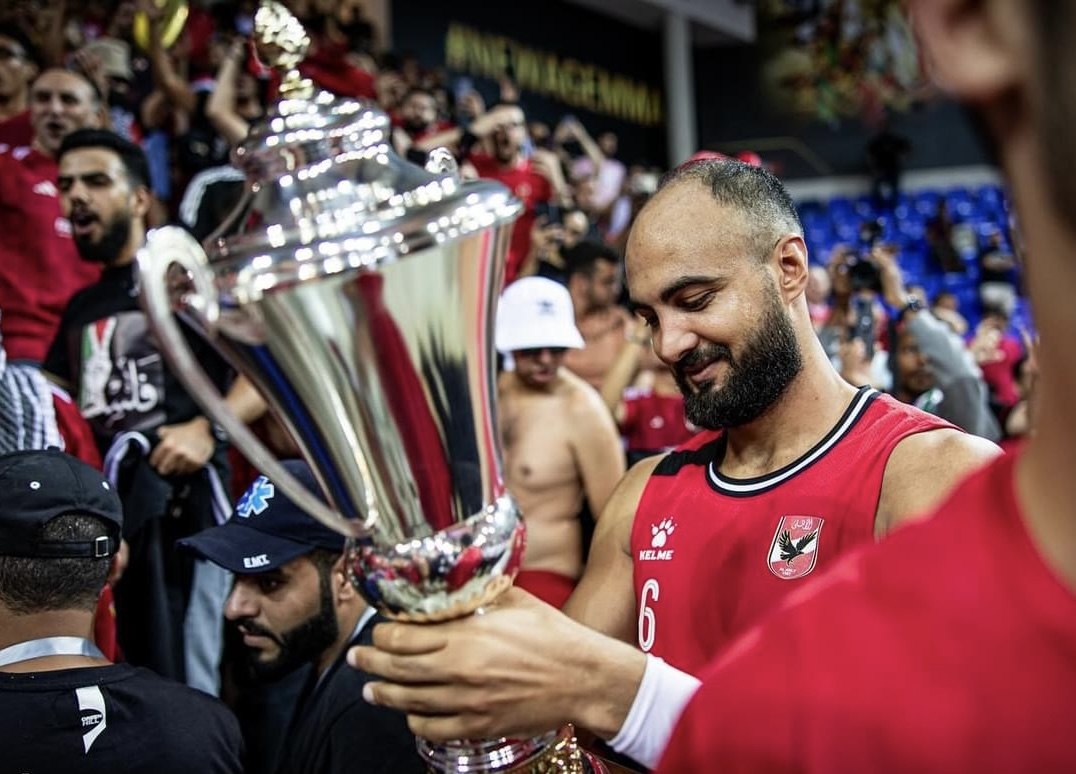
Sarhan with the Super Cup trophy

Sarhan was named the MVP for the Egypt Super Cup game in Bahrain after a great performance scoring 14 points and 5 rebounds in 11 minutes in a win over Zamalek 64–60. It was Al Ahly first Super Cup title. He was also named the MVP for the Egyptian Mortabet League 2023–24 after beating his old team (Smouha) in the finals.

== International career ==
Sarhan represented Egypt in the 2011 FIBA Under-19 World Championship, where he averaged 6.8 ppg, 2.4 rpg and 71.4% ft. Also, represented Egypt in the African World Cup Qualifier 2017, the AfroBasket Qualifiers 2020 and AfroBasket 2021 in Rwanda.

Sarhan was set to play at the 2023 FIBA Basketball World Cup with Egypt, before he withdraws due to family reasons.

== College career statistics ==
During his time at WOU, Sarhan entered the contest with the third longest streak of made field goals in GNAC conference history with 15.

GP	Games played	GS	Games started	MPG	Minutes per game
FG%	Field goal percentage	3P%	3-point field goal percentage	FT%	Free throw percentage
RPG	Rebounds per game	APG	Assists per game	SPG	Steals per game
BPG	Blocks per game	PPG	Points per game	**Bold**	Career high

Year	Team	GP	GS	MPG	FG%	3P%	FT%	RPG	APG	SPG	BPG	PPG
2013-14	Western Oregon Wolves	**30**	**20**	**19.5**	.**528**	**.444**	.743	**4.6**	**0.3**	**.73**	**.567**	**11.6**
2014-15	Western Oregon Wolves	30	2	16.1	.446	.273	**.745**	3.7	0.3	.3	.3	7.0
Career		60	22	17.8	.493	.323	.744	4.2	.3	.517	.433	9.3

== Awards and accomplishments ==
=== Club ===
==== Al Ahly ====
- Basketball Africa League championship: (2023)
- 4x Egyptian Premier League: (2022, 2023, 2025, 2026)
- 2x Egyptian Cup: (2022, 2023)
- 2x Egyptian Super Cup: (2023, 2025)
- 5x Egyptian Mortabet League: (2021, 2022, 2023, 2024,2025)
- Arab Club Basketball Championship: (2021)
- Cairo League: (2021)

===== Smouha SC =====
- **FIBA Africa Basketball League** Third place: (2019)

=== College ===
==== Western Oregon University ====
- GNAC Regular Season title

Individual

- Egyptian Super Cup MVP (2023)
- Egyptian Mortabet League MVP (2023)

== Coaching career ==
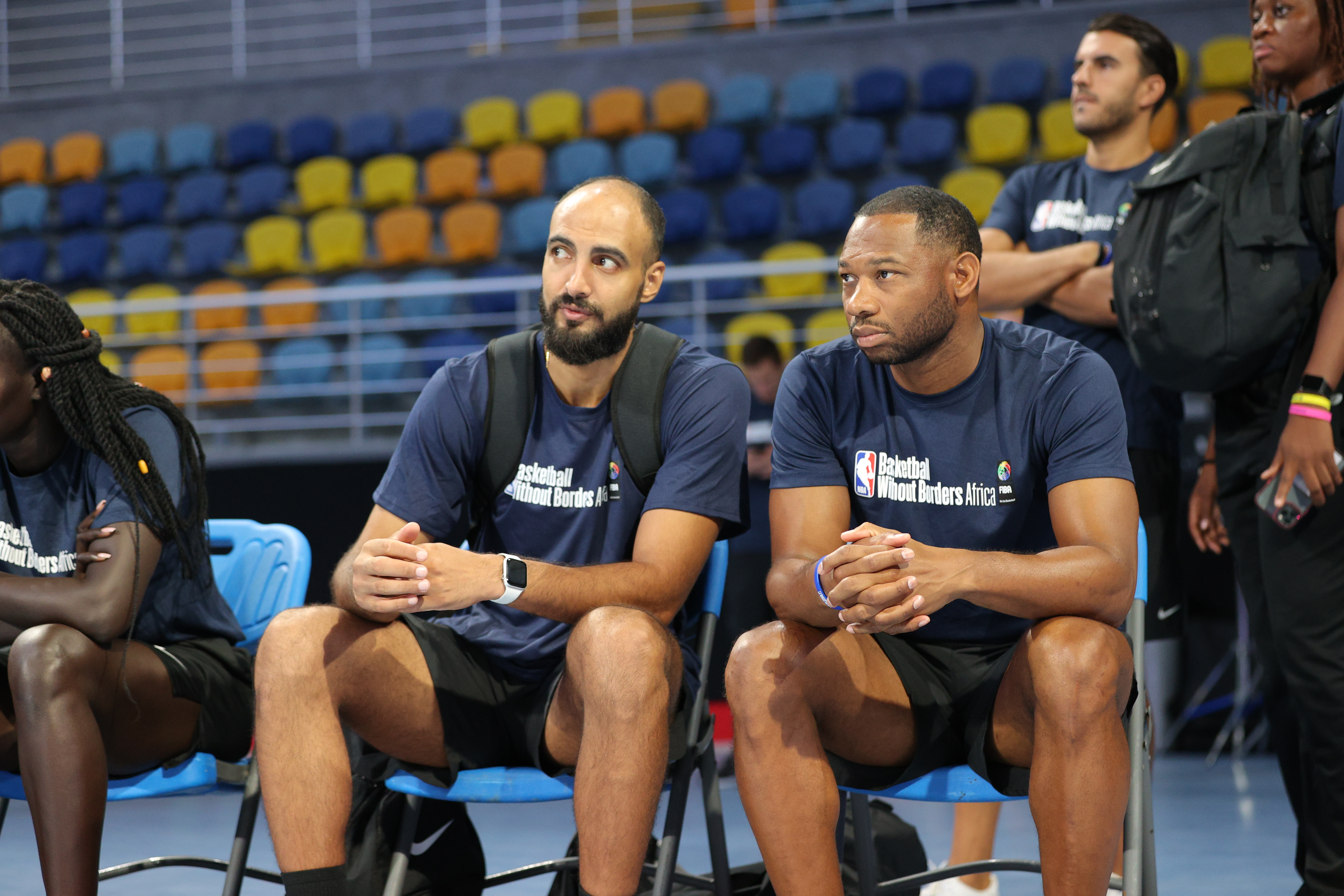
Sarhan and Willie Green (BWB)

Sarhan was invited to be a part of the 18th Basketball Without Borders (BWB) Africa 2022 camp in Cairo, Egypt as an assistant coach.

Sarhan made his coaching debut in July 2025, as he was on the Miami Heat's coaching staff as an assistant coach during the California Classic Summer League in San Francisco and the 2025 NBA Summer League in Las Vegas.

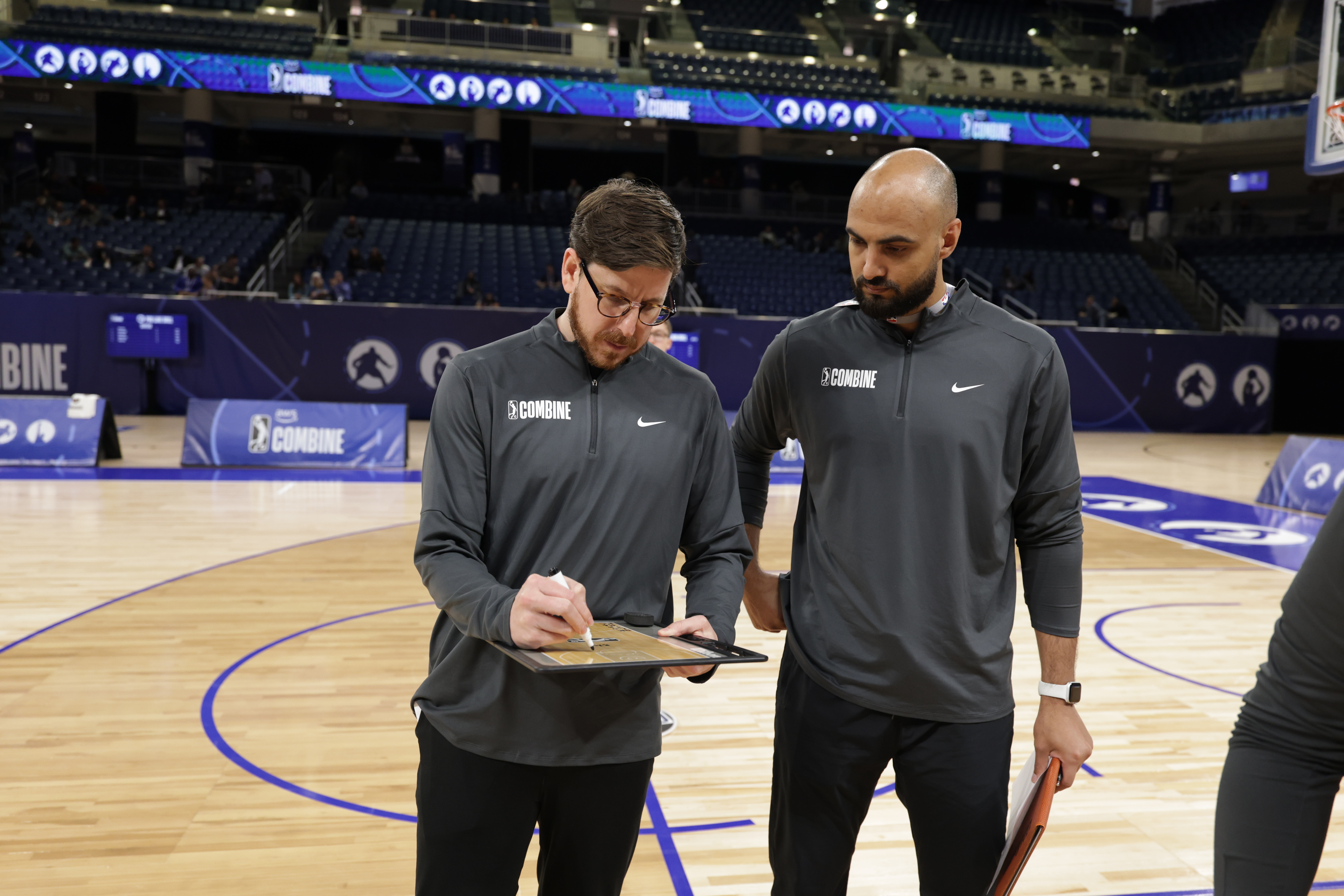
Coach Marwan Sarhan and Coach will Scott during Combine

In 2026, Sarhan was selected as a head coach for the Portsmouth Invitational Tournament (PIT), one of the first major pre-draft evaluation events leading into the NBA Draft process. During the tournament, Peter Suder, one of the players one Sarhan's team, later earned an invitation to the AWS NBA Draft Combine.

Following the PIT, Sarhan was also selected to coach at the 2026 AWS G League Combine. After the event, two players from his team - Aaron Nkrumah and Rafael Castro - received invitations to the AWS NBA Draft Combine the following day.

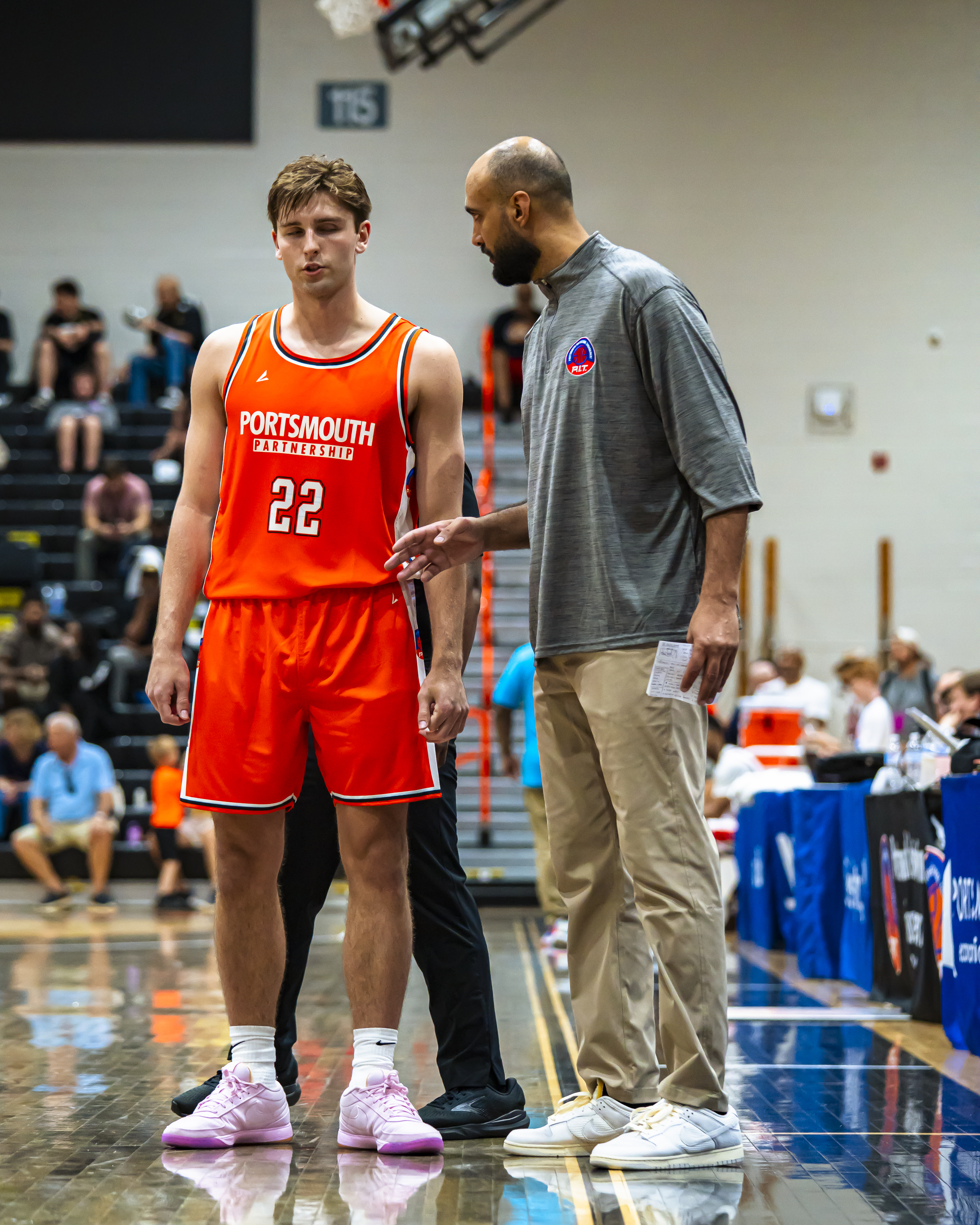
Coach Marwan Sarhan with Peter Suder PIT
