= 2024 Egyptian Basketball Cup =

Egyptian Basketball Cup
- Season: 2024
- Dates: 31 March – 2 May 2024
- Number of games: 8
- Teams: 8

Finals
- Champions: Al Ittihad Alexandria (12th title)
- Runners-up: Al Ahly
- Third place: Gezira

Seasons
- ← 2022–23 2024–25 →

The 2024 Egyptian Basketball Cup is a season of the Egyptian Basketball Cup which began on 31 March 2024 and ended 2 May 2024 with the final. Al itthad Alexandriawon the cup title, its record extending 11th title.

Contrary to the previous season, only 8 teams participated in a single-game knockout tournament. Al Ittihad Alexandria won its 12th title, tying the record held by Zamalek. Meanwhile Anas Mahmoud was named the tournament's MVP.

== Bracket ==
Quarter-finals
31 March
Army	47
Al Ahly	81
31 March
Gezira	94
Telecom Egypt	76
31 March
Sporting Alexandria	74
Al Ittihad Alexandria	75
31 March
Zamalek	83
Egypt Insurance	57

Semi-finals
30 April
Al Ahly	67
Gezira	66
30 April
Al Ittihad Alexandria	76
Zamalek	68

Final
2 May
Al Ahly	65
Al Ittihad Alexandria	68
Third place
2 May
Zamalek	67
Gezira	77

=== Third place game ===
2 May 2024	Gezira	77–67	Zamalek	6th of October
6:30 PM (GMT)	Scoring by quarter: 24–11, 22–16, 20–22, 11–18
	Pts: Sameh 20; Rebs: Ebrahim 8 Asts: El Gindy 6	Boxscore	Pts: Hesham, Omar 13; Rebs: Ashraf 12; Asts: Azab 5	Arena: Hassan Moustafa Sports Hall

=== Final ===
2 May 2024	Al Ahly	65–68	Al Ittihad Alexandria	6th of October
9:00 PM (GMT)	Scoring by quarter: 14–19, 16–18, 17–17, 20–14
	Pts: Gendy 26; Rebs: Kejo 17; Asts: Three players 3	Boxscore	Pts: Metwaly 20; Rebs: Kamal, Mahmoud 8 Asts: Dixon 7	Arena: Hassan Moustafa Sports Hall

== Individual awards ==
Award winners were selected after the final.

Award	Player	Team
Best Player of the Tournament (MVP)	Anas Mahmoud	Al Ittihad
Best Scorer	Amar Al Jundi	Al Ahly
Best Three-Point Scorer	Ahmed Adel	Al Ittihad
