= 2022–23 Egyptian Basketball Cup =

Egyptian Basketball Cup
- Season: 2022–23
- Dates: 8 December 2022 – 19 April 2023
- Number of games: 15
- Teams: 15

Finals
- Champions: Al Ahly (11th title)
- Runners-up: Zamalek
- Finals MVP: Omar Oraby (Al Ahly)

Seasons
- ← 2021–22 2023–24 →

The 2022–23 Egyptian Basketball Cup was a season of the Egyptian Basketball Cup which began on 8 December 2022 and ended on 19 April 2024 with the final. Al Ahly won the cup title, its record extending 11th title.

== Bracket ==
Round of 16
8 December
Telecom Egypt	67
Smouha	81
8 December
Army	68
Gezira	85
8 December
Al Ahly
bye
8 December
Petrojet	49
Al Shams	66
8 December
Sporting Alexandria	59
Al Ittihad Alexandria	79
8 December
Suez Canal	64
Egypt Insurance	62

Quarter-finals
12 December
Al Ahly	91
Smouha	48
12 December
Gezira	74
Horse Owners' Club	52
12 December
Zamalek	82
Al Shams	58
13 December
Al Ittihad	97
Suez Canal	57

Semi-finals
17 April
Al Ahly	88
Gezira	52
17 April
Zamalek	77
Al Ittihad	66

Final
19 April
Al Ahly	72
Zamalek	65
Third place
19 April
Gezira	60
Al Ittihad	71
