= Lu Wenbo =

Chinese basketball player

Lu Wenbo 陆文博
No. 8 – Zhejiang Golden Bulls
- Position: Small forward
- League: CBA

Personal information
- Born: 4 August 1997 (age 29) Suihua, Heilongjiang, China
- Listed height: 1.94 m (6 ft 4 in)

Career information
- Playing career: 2016–present

Career history
- 2016–present: Zhejiang Golden Bulls

Lu Wenbo (born 4 August 1997) is a Chinese basketball player who plays as small forward at CBA club Zhejiang Golden Bulls . He also represented China at the 2024 Summer Olympics in 3x3 event.
