= Western Oregon Wolves =

Sports team of Western Oregon University

- University: Western Oregon University
- Conference: Great Northwest Athletic Conference; Lone Star Conference (football)
- NCAA: Division II
- Athletic director: Randi Lydum
- Location: Monmouth, Oregon
- Varsity teams: 12
- Football stadium: McArthur Field
- Basketball arena: New PE Building
- Baseball stadium: WOU Baseball Field
- Softball stadium: WOU Softball Field
- Volleyball arena: New PE Building
- Mascot: Wolfie
- Nickname: Wolves
- Colors: WOU Red, White, Black, and WOU Grey
- Website: wouwolves.com
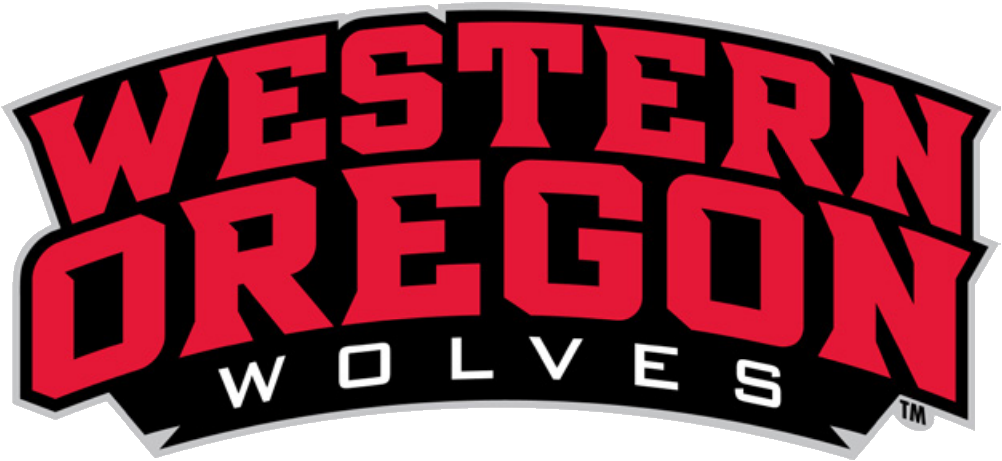

The Western Oregon Wolves (also WOU Wolves) are the athletic teams that represent Western Oregon University, located in Monmouth, Oregon, in intercollegiate sports as a member of the Division II level of the National Collegiate Athletic Association (NCAA), primarily competing in the Great Northwest Athletic Conference (GNAC) since the 2001–02 academic year. The Wolves previously competed in the D-II Pacific West Conference (PacWest) from 1998–99 to 2000–01; and in the Cascade Collegiate Conference (CCC) of the National Association of Intercollegiate Athletics (NAIA) from 1993–94 to 1997–98 (although they remained in the CCC as an affiliate member for some sports from 1998–99 to 1999–2000).

== Varsity teams ==
Western Oregon competes in 12 intercollegiate varsity sports: Men's sports include baseball, basketball, cross country, football, soccer and track & field; while women's sports include basketball, cross country, soccer, softball, track & field and volleyball.

=== Softball ===
On April 26, 2008, Sara Tucholsky, a reserve outfielder on the Wolves softball team (2005–08), hit the first home run of her college career in a victory over Central Washington University, but injured her knee rounding first base; Central Washington's Mallory Holtman and Liz Wallace carried Tucholsky around the rest of the bases to home plate. This act of sportsmanship was heavily covered by national media outlets, and resulted in Tucholsky, Holtman, and Wallace's winning the Best Moment award at the 2008 ESPY Awards.

The Wolves softball team appeared in one Women's College World Series in 1975.

== Club sports ==
=== Club sports at Western Oregon University ===
Club sports are separated into two categories, Tier 1 & Tier 2. Tier 1 clubs compete or perform formally against other colleges or universities. Tier 2 clubs are more about socializing around a common interest.

==== Tier 1 ====
- Women's Basketball
- Dance
- Men's Lacrosse
- Rock Climbing
- Men's Rugby
- Women's+ Rugby
- Men's Soccer
- Women's Soccer
- Women's Volleyball

==== Tier 2 ====
- Swimming
- Golf
- Wrestling

=== Men's lacrosse ===
Pertaining to club sports on campus, not regulated by the NCAA or NAIA, the Western Oregon Men's Lacrosse Club has won the Division II PNCLL championship trophy in 2008, 2009, 2010, 2011 and 2012. The Western Oregon Men's Soccer club won the Division II CCSL (Cascade Collegiate Soccer League) Championship in 2012, led by Nathan Tew who also was a member of the 2015 Football Team as a backup kicker.

=== Men's rugby ===
WOU Men's Rugby was established in 2001 by several ambitious students looking to hang up the football cleats for a new sport. Western Oregon University Men's Rugby (WOR) has grown to become one of the most successful rugby programs in the pacific northwest. WOU Rugby has traditionally been a part of the DII level of the NW region, retaining a completely undefeated regular season record in DII league play. During the 2008–2009 season, WOR became the DII Pacific Northwest Champions. With the championship, WOR made the trip out to Florida to compete in the 2009 DII USA Rugby National Championship. Following the 2011–2012 DII 15s season, WOR accepted admittance into the Northwest Collegiate Rugby Conference in the D1 section of USA Rugby. WOR now competes in 7s and 15s during fall and spring seasons.

== National award winners ==
Corbett Award
Year	Name	Position
2003	Gary Cunningham	Athletic Director

== Notable athletes ==
- Kevin Boss, former NFL tight end for the New York Giants, Oakland Raiders and Kansas City Chiefs
- Dan Straily (born 1988), starting pitcher in the Philadelphia Phillies organization
- Tyrell Williams, former NFL Wide receiver for the Detroit Lions. Former NFL teams, Oakland Raiders and San Diego Chargers.
- Marwan Sarhan, basketball player for Al Ahly and former player for Smouha SC.
