= Yiwu Gymnasium =

Sports venue in Yiwu, China

Coordinates: 29.3059°N 120.0690°E

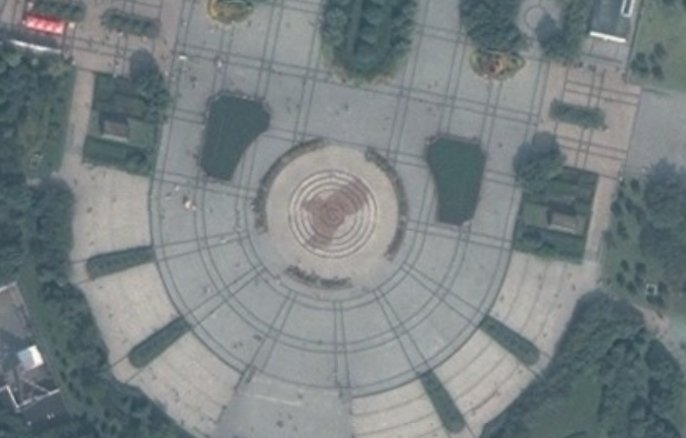
- Interactive map of Yiwu Gymnasium
- Full name: Yiwu Gymnasium
- Location: Yiwu, Jinhua, Zhejiang, China
- Capacity: 6,000

Construction
- Opened: 2005

Tenant
- Zhejiang Golden Bulls (CBA)

Yiwu Gymnasium is an indoor sporting arena located in Yiwu, Jinhua, Zhejiang, China. The capacity of the arena is 6,000 spectators and opened in 2005. It hosts indoor sporting events such as basketball and volleyball. It hosts the Zhejiang Golden Bulls of the Chinese Basketball Association.
