= 2023 FIBA Intercontinental Cup (September) =

33rd edition of the FIBA Intercontinental Cup in 2023

2023 FIBA Intercontinental Cup Singapore

Tournament details
- Host country: Singapore
- City: Singapore
- Dates: 21–24 September
- Teams: 6
- Venue: 1

Final positions
- Champions: (Brazil) Sesi Franca (1st title)
- Runners-up: (Germany) Telekom Baskets Bonn
- Third place: (China) Zhejiang Golden Bulls
- Fourth place: (Egypt) Al Ahly

Tournament statistics
- MVP: David Jackson (Franca)
- Top scorer: Lucas Dias (Franca, 18.0 points per game)

Official website
- Official website

The 2023 FIBA Intercontinental Cup was the 33rd edition of the FIBA Intercontinental Cup. The tournament was hosted in the Singapore Indoor Stadium in Singapore. It was the first time Singapore hosted the tournament, as well as the first time the tournament is being held in Asia.

It was the second Intercontinental Cup in the same calendar year, as the tournament cycle was changed to September to better adapt to the club's schedules. It was also the first tournament under an expanded format with six teams, with two teams from Asia being added.

Franca won its first title after beating Telekom Baskets Bonn in the final. Franca's Lucas Dias scored a fadeaway jumper in the post to beat the buzzer which gave them the win; David Jackson was named MVP.

== Teams ==
Location of teams of the 2023 FIBA Intercontinental Cup Singapore

Contrary to the previous seasons, the NBA G League Ignite were pre-selected as representatives for the NBA G League and were the first known team to participate. Two representative from Asia (a pre-selected Chinese Basketball Association club and another) were added as FIBA announced that the competition would expand from four to six teams.

On 19 June 2023, FIBA announced the Zhejiang Golden Bulls to be the CBA representative, and also announced they invited Al Manama as the sixth and final team, following Manama's win of the 2022–23 West Asia Super League.

Team	Qualification	Qualified date	Participations (bold indicates winners)	Ref.
(United States) NBA G League Ignite	Pre-selected as representative of the NBA G League (Note: NBA G League Ignite finished 11th place in the Western Conference of the 2022–23 NBA G League regular season, and didn't advance to the playoffs.)	3 March 2023	Debut	
(China) Zhejiang Golden Bulls	Pre-selected as representative of the CBA (Note: Zhejiang Golden Bulls finished 1st place in the 2022–23 CBA regular season, and runners-up in the playoffs.)	19 June 2023	Debut	
(Egypt) Al Ahly	Winners of the 2023 BAL season	27 May 2023	Debut	
(Brazil) Sesi Franca	Winners of the 2022–23 BCL Americas	15 April 2023	5 (1975, 1976, 1977, 1980, 1981)	
(Germany) Telekom Baskets Bonn	Winners of the 2022–23 Basketball Champions League	14 May 2023	Debut	
(Bahrain) Al Manama	Winners of the 2022–23 West Asia Super League	19 June 2023 (Note: Manama Club won the 2022–23 West Asia Super League which qualifies for the FIBA Asia Champions Cup, but was confirmed by FIBA on 19 June.)	Debut	

== Venue ==
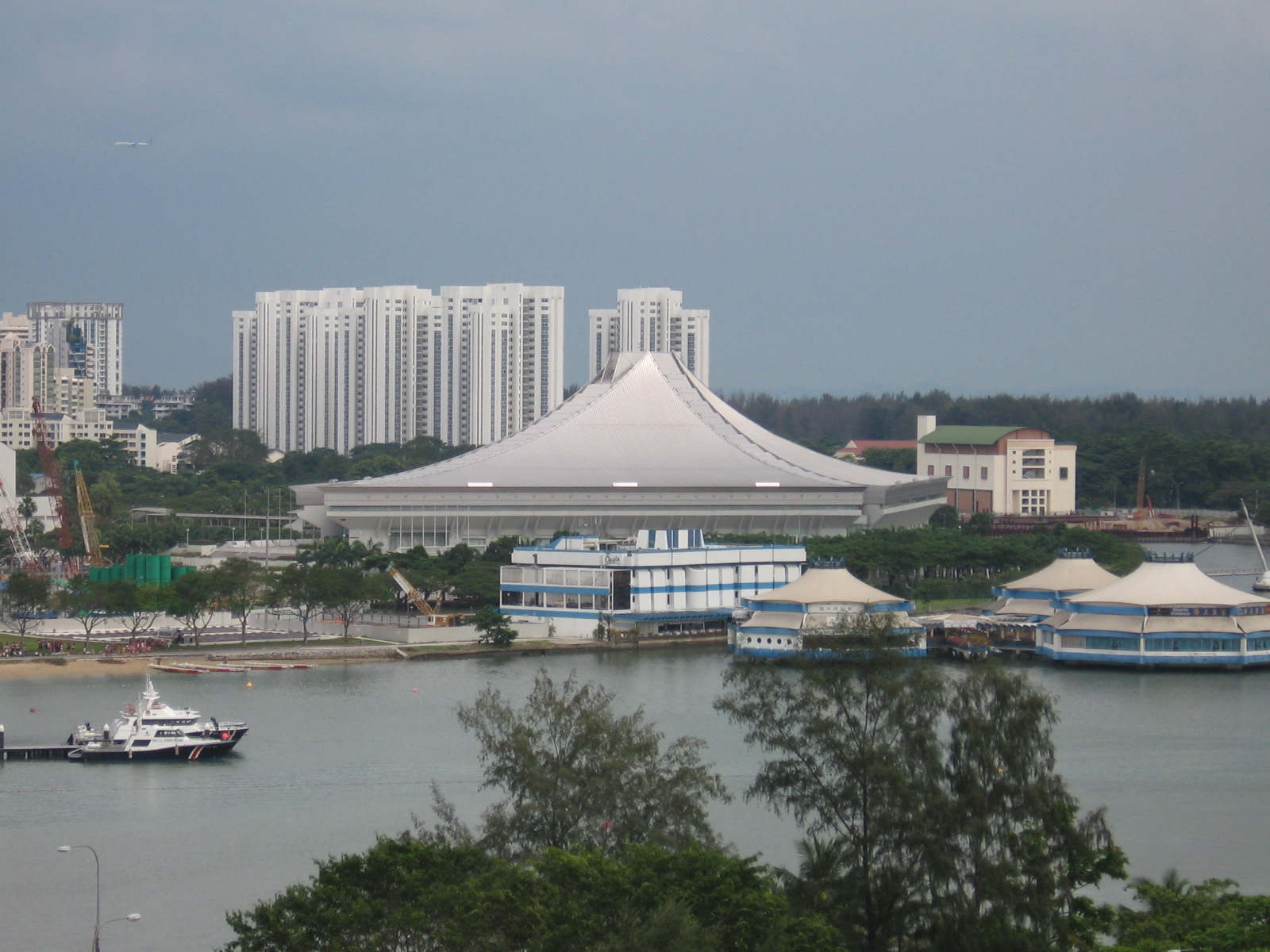
The Singapore Indoor Stadium

The 2023 season was the first of three tournaments to be held in Singapore in the Singapore Indoor Stadium, under an agreement between FIBA and Sport Singapore, an organisation controlled by the country's government. Opened in 1989, the indoor arena can host 12,000 people for sporting events and is located in the Singapore Sports Hub.

== Draw ==
The draw was held on 20 June 2023 at the ArtScience Museum in Singapore, and was attended by Vlade Divac, Yi Jianlian and Ian Mahinmi.

== Group phase ==
All times in Singapore Standard Time local time (GMT+8).

=== Group A ===
Al Ahly defeated the NBA G League Ignite 82–76 to become the first African team to win a game in Intercontinental Cup history. The following day, Al Ahly was easily defeated by Brazilian side Franca, 90–70. Franca's 41-year old David Jackson led the team with 22 points, Lucas Dias and Márcio Santos both added 21 points. On the last day, Sesi Franca beat the NBA G League Ignite 98–89 to clinch the first place in Group A and to qualify for the final.

Pos	Team	Pld	W	L	PF	PA	PD	Pts	Qualification
1	(Brazil) Sesi Franca	2	2	0	188	159	+29	4	Advance to final
2	(Egypt) Al Ahly	2	1	1	152	166	−14	3	Qualification to third place game
3	(United States) NBA G League Ignite	2	0	2	165	180	−15	2	Qualification to fifth place game

Source: FIBA

21 September 2023
19:00

Boxscore

NBA G League Ignite (United States)	76–82	(Egypt) Al Ahly
Scoring by quarter: 21–20, 22–25, 16–17, 17–20
Pts: Smith 18; Rebs: Almansa 8 Asts: Johnson 6		Pts: Amin 15; Rebs: Kejo 13; Asts: Cole 9

Singapore Indoor Stadium, Singapore
Referees: Yohan Rosso (FRA), Scott Beker (AUS), Viola Györgyi (ROU)

22 September 2023
15:00

Boxscore

Sesi Franca (Brazil)	90–70	(Egypt) Al Ahly
Scoring by quarter: 26–17, 16–15, 26–15, 22–23
Pts: Dias, Jackson 22; Rebs: Márcio 9 Asts: Georginho 9		Pts: Cole 17; Rebs: Amin 9 Asts: Amin 5

Singapore Indoor Stadium, Singapore
Referees: Omar Bermúdez (MEX), Amy Bonner (USA), Péter Praksch (HUN)

23 September 2023
15:00

Boxscore

NBA G League Ignite (United States)	89–98	(Brazil) Sesi Franca
Scoring by quarter: 23–25, 27–29, 23–22, 16–22
Pts: Jenkins 15; Rebs: Almansa 12; Asts: Jenkins 6		Pts: Georginho, Luz 19; Rebs: Ferreira 9 Asts: Borges, Jackson 5

Singapore Indoor Stadium, Singapore
Referees: Antonio Conde (ESP), Yevgeniy Mikheyev (KAZ), Péter Praksch (HUN)

=== Group B ===
The first game of the tournament was between Telekom Baskets Bonn and Al Manama, in which Bonn comfortably defeated Manama 105–50 behind 28 points from Sam Griesel. On the second day, the Zhejiang Golden Bulls made their debut with a convincing 95–78 victory over Manama, relegating them to the fifth place game. Bonn blew out the Golden Bulls on the third gameday to qualify for the final.

Pos	Team	Pld	W	L	PF	PA	PD	Pts	Qualification
1	(Germany) Telekom Baskets Bonn	2	2	0	216	100	+116	4	Advance to final
2	(China) Zhejiang Golden Bulls	2	1	1	145	189	−44	3	Qualification to third place game
3	(Bahrain) Al Manama	2	0	2	128	200	−72	2	Qualification to fifth place game

Source: FIBA

21 September 2023
15:00

Boxscore

Telekom Baskets Bonn (Germany)	105–50	(Bahrain) Al Manama
Scoring by quarter: 26–16, 24–6, 34–11, 21–17
Pts: Griesel 28; Rebs: Griesel 10; Asts: Frey 6		Pts: Pointer 14; Rebs: Thibodeaux 5 Asts: Thibodeaux 6

Singapore Indoor Stadium, Singapore
Referees: Antonio Conde (ESP), Amy Bonner (USA), Wael Mostafa (EGY)

22 September 2023
19:00

Box score

Zhejiang Golden Bulls (China)	95–78	(Bahrain) Al Manama
Scoring by quarter: 23–15, 23–22, 32–21, 17–20
Pts: Perry 17; Rebs: Perry 6 Asts: Yibo 6		Pts: Pointer 19; Rebs: Williams 10; Asts: Haji, Pointer 4

Singapore Indoor Stadium, Singapore
Referees: Yohan Rosso (FRA), Scott Beker (AUS), Yevgeniy Mikheyev (KAZ)

23 September 2023
19:00

Box score

Zhejiang Golden Bulls (China)	50–111	(Germany) Telekom Baskets Bonn
Scoring by quarter: 16–30, 11–33, 14–23, 9–25
Pts: Perry 10; Rebs: Perry 9 Asts: three players 2		Pts: Griesel 16; Rebs: Turudic 9 Asts: Frey 9

Singapore Indoor Stadium, Singapore
Referees: Yohan Rosso (FRA), Omar Bermúdez (MEX), Viola Györgyi (ROM)

== Final phase ==
=== Fifth place game ===
The NBA G League Ignite captured the fifth place following their 80–60 win over Al Manama. Heading into the last three minutes, it was a close-contested game as the score was 63–60 with 3:33 remaining. From that point, the Ignite's Babacar Sané scored five straight points, followed by two three-pointers and a Ron Holland dunk that gave the Ignite a 17–0 run in the final three minutes. Sané had a double-double of 22 points and 11 rebounds, Ron Holland finished with 21 points and 11 rebounds.

24 September 2023
12:00

Boxscore

NBA G League Ignite (United States)	80–60	(Bahrain) Al Manama
Scoring by quarter: 17–10, 19–20, 19–17, 25–13
Pts: Sané 22; Rebs: Holland, Sané 11; Asts: Almansa 6		Pts: Pointer 20; Rebs: Pointer 13; Asts: Rashed 5

Singapore Indoor Stadium, Singapore
Referees: Yohan Rosso (FRA), Viola Györgyi (ROU), Wael Mostafa (EGY)

=== Third place game ===
In the first half, Al Ahly had a lead as big as 11 points, however the Zhejiang Golden Bulls took control in the second half. Reggie Perry had a double-double of 23 points and 12 rebounds. Wu Qian contributed 20 points and 5 assists. The Golden Bulls became the first Chinese team to reach the podium in the Intercontinental Cup. Al Ahly finished fourth, which was the third time in a row the African representative finished in this position.

24 September 2023
15:00

Boxscore

Al Ahly (Egypt)	74–81	(China) Zhejiang Golden Bulls
Scoring by quarter: 22–12, 16–25, 15–22, 21–22
Pts: Amin, Oraby 14; Rebs: Fakuade, Oraby 11; Asts: Amin 4		Pts: Perry 23; Rebs: Perry 12; Asts: Gulley 7

Singapore Indoor Stadium, Singapore
Referees: Omar Bermúdez (MEX), Yevgeniy Mikheyev (KAZ), Péter Praksch (HUN)

=== Final ===
In a tightly contested game, Telekom Baskets Bonn went into the final two minutes with the advantage, coming off a three-pointer by Christian Sengfelder. Glynn Watson Jr. made a floater to put Bonn up 69–68 with 38 seconds left in the game. Franca missed their last shot and did not foul with 26 seconds left in the game. After a shot clock violation, Franca coach Helinho called a time-out as the Brazilians prepared to inbound the ball in front court. Franca inbounded the ball Lucas Dias who scored a fadeaway jumper in the post to beat the buzzer. Finishing with a score of 70–69, it was the second final to finish by a single point margin, following the first leg of 2015 between Bauru and Real Madrid. Franca became the third Brazilian team to win the Intercontintenal Cup, after Sírio and Flamengo. David Jackson, at age 41, was named the FIBA Intercontinental Cup MVP following his 12 points and 8 assists in the final.

24 September 2023
19:00

Boxscore

Sesi Franca (Brazil)	70–69	(Germany) Telekom Baskets Bonn
Scoring by quarter: 18–13, 16–21, 24–16, 12–19
Pts: Márcio 15; Rebs: Márcio 8 Asts: Jackson 8		Pts: Watson Jr. 16; Rebs: Griesel, Kirkwood 5 Asts: Watson Jr. 5

Singapore Indoor Stadium, Singapore
Attendance: 8,000
Referees: Antonio Conde (ESP), Amy Bonner (USA), Scott Beker (AUS)

== Final standings ==
Pos	Team	Pld	W	L	PF	PA	PD	Pts
1st place, gold medalist(s)	(Brazil) Sesi Franca	3	3	0	258	228	+30	6
2nd place, silver medalist(s)	(Germany) Telekom Baskets Bonn	3	2	1	285	170	+115	5
3rd place, bronze medalist(s)	(China) Zhejiang Golden Bulls	3	2	1	226	263	−37	5
4	(Egypt) Al Ahly	3	1	2	226	247	−21	4
5	(United States) NBA G League Ignite	3	1	2	245	240	+5	4
6	(Bahrain) Al Manama	3	0	3	188	280	−92	3

Source: FIBA

== Statistical leaders ==
The following players were the individual leaders in the 2023 tournament.

Category	Player	Team(s)	Statistic
Efficiency per game	David Jackson	Franca	23.0
Points per game	Lucas Dias	Franca	18.0
Rebounds per game	Omar Oraby	Al Ahly	9.7
Assists per game	Georginho	Franca	5.8
Steals per game	Glynn Watson Jr.	Telekom Baskets Bonn	2.7
Blocks per game	Sir'Dominic Pointer	Al Manama	2.7
Minutes per game	Sir'Dominic Pointer	Al Manama	33.7
