= Reggie Perry (basketball) =

American basketball player (born 2000)

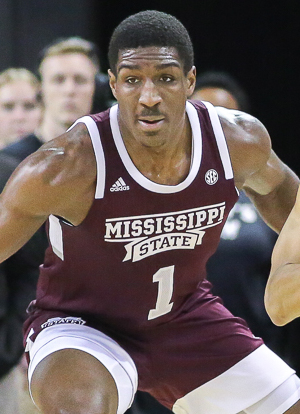
- Perry with Mississippi State in 2020

No. 11 – Bosna
- Position: Power forward / center
- League: Bosnian League; ABA League; EuroCup

Personal information
- Born: March 21, 2000 (age 26) Flowood, Mississippi, U.S.
- Listed height: 6 ft 9 in (2.06 m)
- Listed weight: 250 lb (113 kg)

Career information
- High school: Thomasville (Thomasville, Georgia)
- College: Mississippi State (2018–2020)
- NBA draft: 2020: 2nd round, 57th overall pick
- Drafted by: Los Angeles Clippers
- Playing career: 2020–present

Career history
- 2020–2021: Brooklyn Nets
- 2021: →Long Island Nets
- 2021–2022: Raptors 905
- 2021–2022: Portland Trail Blazers
- 2022: Indiana Pacers
- 2022–2023: Raptors 905
- 2023: Motor City Cruise
- 2023: Changwon LG Sakers
- 2023–2024: Zhejiang Golden Bulls
- 2024: Shenzhen Leopards
- 2024–2025: Greensboro Swarm
- 2025: Gigantes de Carolina
- 2025–2026: Beijing Royal Fighters
- 2026–present: Bosna

Career highlights
- All-NBA G League Second Team (2022); SEC Co-Player of the Year – AP (2020); First-team All-SEC (2020); SEC All-Freshman Team (2019); McDonald's All-American (2018); FIBA Under-19 World Cup MVP (2019)
- Stats at NBA.com
- Stats at Basketball Reference
Medals
Men's basketball
Representing United States
FIBA Under-19 World Cup
Gold medal – first place	2019 Greece	Team

Reginald Jordan Perry (born March 21, 2000) is an American professional basketball player for Bosna of the Bosnian League, the ABA League, and the EuroCup. He played college basketball for the Mississippi State Bulldogs.

== High school career ==
Perry attended Thomasville High School in Thomasville, Georgia. In his senior season, he averaged 22 points and 11 rebounds per game, earning Georgia Class 2A Player of the Year honors and leading Thomasville to its first state championship. In March 2018, Perry played in the McDonald's All-American Game.

=== Recruiting ===
On August 17, 2016, Perry committed to play college basketball for Arkansas, but in the following July, he decommitted from the program. On July 17, 2017, he committed to Mississippi State. Perry was considered a five-star recruit by Rivals and a four-star recruit by ESPN and 247Sports.

College recruiting
Name	Hometown	School	Height	Weight	Commit date
Reggie Perry; PF	Thomasville, GA	Thomasville (GA)	6 ft 8 in (2.03 m)	239 lb (108 kg)	Jul 17, 2017
Reggie Perry; PF	Recruit ratings: Rivals: 247Sports: ESPN: (89)				
Overall recruit ranking: Rivals: 29 247Sports: 35 ESPN: 29
Note: In many cases, Scout, Rivals, 247Sports, On3, and ESPN may conflict in their listings of height and weight.; In these cases, the average was taken. ESPN grades are on a 100-point scale.; Sources: "Mississippi State 2018 Basketball Commitments". Rivals.; "2018 Mississippi State Bulldogs Recruiting Class". ESPN.; "2018 Team Ranking". Rivals.

== College career ==
As a freshman at Mississippi State, Perry averaged 9.7 points and 7.2 rebounds per game. On February 23, 2019, he scored a career-high 21 points, including 17 in the second half, against South Carolina. After the season, Perry declared for the 2019 NBA draft and attended the draft combine but withdrew from the draft to return to the Bulldogs. On November 5, 2019, in his sophomore season opener, he recorded 13 points, seven rebounds and three assists in a win over FIU. At the conclusion of the regular season, Perry was named to the First Team All-SEC. As a sophomore, Perry averaged 17.4 points and 10.1 rebounds per game. After the season he declared for the 2020 NBA draft.

== Professional career ==
=== Brooklyn Nets (2020–2021) ===
On November 18, 2020, Perry was drafted by the Los Angeles Clippers with the 57th overall pick in the 2020 NBA draft. He was subsequently traded to the Brooklyn Nets on November 19. On November 27, Perry signed with the Nets. On December 19, his contract was converted to a two-way contract. Under the deal, he would split time between the Nets and their NBA G League affiliate, the Long Island Nets. On January 29, 2021, Perry recorded his first career double-double with 10 points and 11 rebounds in the Nets' 147–125 win over the Oklahoma City Thunder.

=== Raptors 905 / Portland Trail Blazers / Indiana Pacers (2021–2022) ===
On September 21, 2021, Perry signed with the Toronto Raptors. On October 13, Perry was waived by the Raptors. He joined the Raptors 905 as an affiliate player.

On December 28, 2021, Perry signed a 10-day contract with the Portland Trail Blazers, and at the conclusion of his 10-day deal, he rejoined Raptors 905.

On February 4, 2022, Perry signed a 10-day contract with the Indiana Pacers, rejoining Raptors 905 on February 14.

On March 30, Perry signed a second 10-day contract with Portland and on April 9, he signed for the rest of the season.

=== Raptors 905 (2022–2023) ===
Perry joined the Los Angeles Clippers for the 2022 NBA Summer League. After not making the final roster for the Toronto Raptors, he re-joined the Raptors 905.

=== Motor City Cruise (2023) ===
On February 24, 2023, Perry was traded to the Motor City Cruise.

=== Changwon LG Sakers (2023) ===
On April 8, 2023, Perry signed with Changwon LG Sakers of the Korean Basketball League.

=== Greensboro Swarm (2024–2025) ===
On November 13, 2024, Perry joined the Greensboro Swarm of the NBA G League.

=== Beijing Royal Fighters (2025–2026) ===
On November 21, 2025, Perry joined Beijing Royal Fighters of the Chinese Basketball Association (CBA).

=== Bosna (2026–present) ===
On September 7, 2026, Perry signed with Bosna of the Bosnian League and the ABA League.

== National team career ==
Perry joined the United States national under-19 team at the 2019 FIBA Under-19 World Cup in Heraklion, Greece. On July 5, 2019, he led all scorers with 28 points and eight rebounds in a 95–80 quarterfinal win over Russia. In seven games, Perry averaged 13.1 points, 7.9 rebounds, and 1.4 steals per game, leading the United States to a gold medal. He was named tournament MVP and joined teammate Tyrese Haliburton on the All-Star Five.

== Personal life ==
Perry's father Al Perry played basketball for Mississippi State in the mid-1970s. He recorded 510 career assists, currently the third-most in program history.

== Career statistics ==
Legend
GP	Games played	GS	Games started	MPG	Minutes per game
FG%	Field goal percentage	3P%	3-point field goal percentage	FT%	Free throw percentage
RPG	Rebounds per game	APG	Assists per game	SPG	Steals per game
BPG	Blocks per game	PPG	Points per game	**Bold**	Career high

=== NBA ===
==== Regular season ====
Year	Team	GP	GS	MPG	FG%	3P%	FT%	RPG	APG	SPG	BPG	PPG
2020–21	Brooklyn	**26**	0	8.1	.410	**.190**	**.769**	2.8	.5	.2	.2	3.0
2021–22	Portland	9	**1**	**19.7**	.500	.188	.600	**5.1**	**1.3**	**1.0**	**.7**	**10.0**
2021–22	Indiana	1	0	10.0	**1.000**	–	–	1.0	.0	.0	.0	2.0
Career		36	1	11.1	.459	.189	.679	3.3	.7	.4	.3	4.7

==== Playoffs ====
Year	Team	GP	GS	MPG	FG%	3P%	FT%	RPG	APG	SPG	BPG	PPG
2021	Brooklyn	5	0	4.4	.538	.400	–	1.2	.2	.2	.0	3.2

=== College ===
Year	Team	GP	GS	MPG	FG%	3P%	FT%	RPG	APG	SPG	BPG	PPG
2018–19	Mississippi State	**34**	18	23.9	**.502**	.282	.716	7.2	.6	.6	.7	9.7
2019–20	Mississippi State	31	**31**	**31.1**	.500	**.324**	**.768**	**10.1**	**2.3**	**.8**	**1.2**	**17.4**
Career		65	49	27.3	.501	.309	.748	8.6	1.4	.7	.9	13.4
