= Márcio Santos (basketball) =

Brazilian basketball player (born 2002)

Márcio
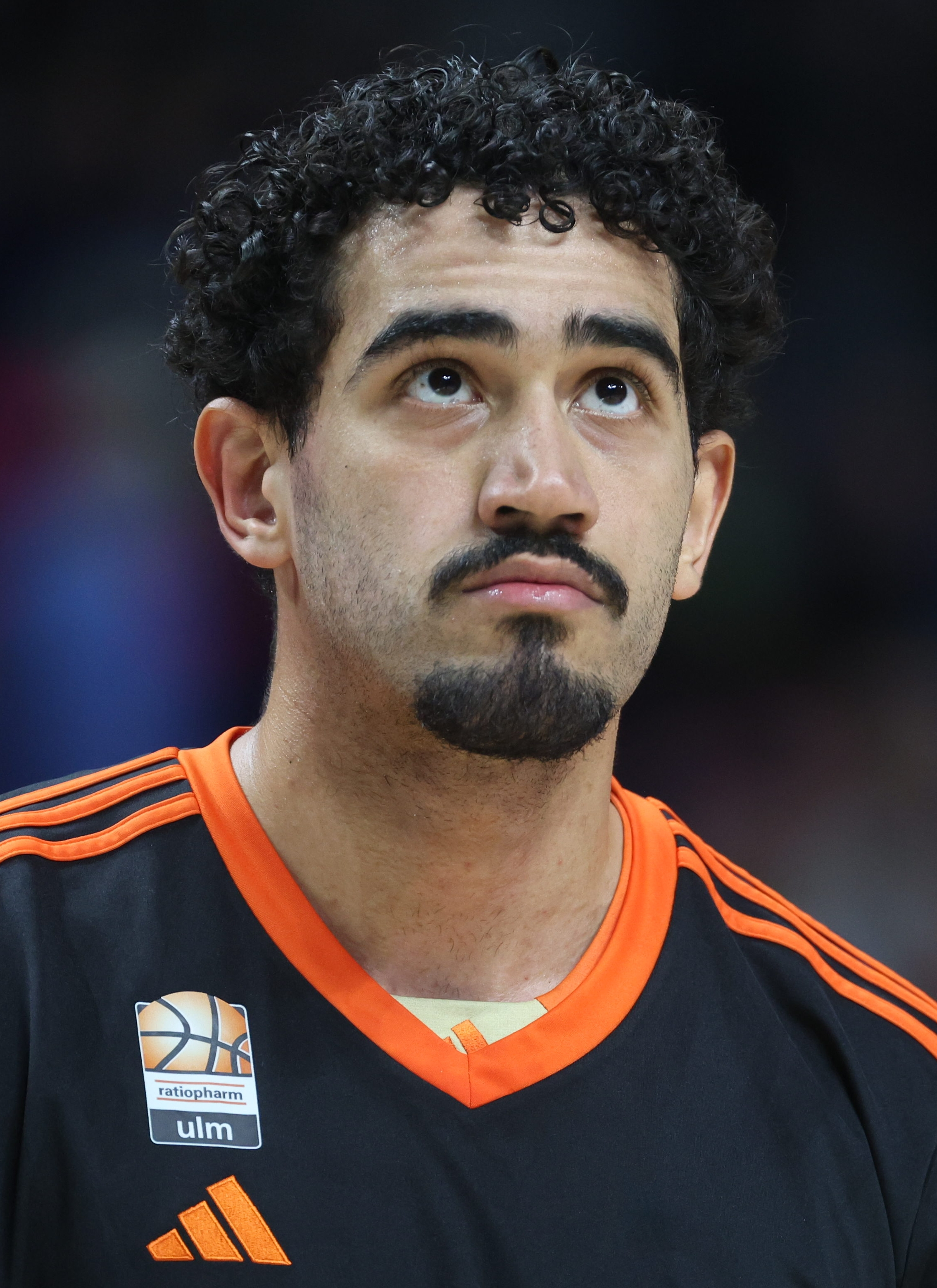
- Márcio in 2024

No. 21 – Baskonia
- Position: Center / power forward
- League: Liga ACB; EuroLeague

Personal information
- Born: 2 November 2002 (age 23) Três Corações, Minas Gerais, Brazil
- Listed height: 2.04 m (6 ft 8 in)
- Listed weight: 114 kg (251 lb)

Career information
- NBA draft: 2023: undrafted
- Playing career: 2018–present

Career history
- 2018–2024: Franca
- 2024–2025: Ratiopharm Ulm
- 2025–2026: Maccabi Tel Aviv
- 2026–present: Baskonia

Career highlights
- FIBA Intercontinental Cup champion (2023); BCL Americas champion (2023); 3× NBB champion (2022–2024); 3× NBB All-Star; Copa Super 8 winner (2023)

Márcio Henrique da Costa Santos (born 2 November 2002), also known mononymously as Márcio, is a Brazilian professional basketball player for Baskonia of the Spanish Liga ACB and the EuroLeague. Márcio is a 2.04 m (6 ft 8 in) tall center. He won the 2023 FIBA Intercontinental Cup with Franca, and was their top scorer of the final. Márcio is a three-time NBB All-Star.

== Professional career ==
Born in Três Corações, Minas Gerais, Márcio debuted in the Novo Basquete Brasil (NBB) in the 2018–19 season with Franca. He had a breakout season in 2020–21, when he averaged 8.1 points.

He enrolled for the 2023 NBA draft, but was not selected. In the 2023 offseason, Márcio played in the 2023 NBA Summer League with the Atlanta Hawks and appeared in five exhibition games, in which he totalled 17 minutes and 2 points. After the Summer League, he re-signed with Franca for one more year.

Márcio won the 2023 FIBA Intercontinental Cup with Franca. On 24 September, Márcio scored a team-high 15 points on 6-for-9 shooting and grabbed 8 rebounds in the 70-69 won final over Telekom Baskets Bonn.

On July 10, 2024, he signed with Ratiopharm Ulm of the German Basketball Bundesliga (BBL).

On July 21, 2025, he signed with Maccabi Tel Aviv of the Israeli Basketball Premier League.

On September 29, 2026, Santos signed a two-year deal with Baskonia of the Spanish Liga ACB and the EuroLeague.
