= Zhejiang Golden Bulls =

- Division: Southern Division
- League: CBA
- Founded: 1995
- History: Zhejiang Squirrels (1995–99); Zhejiang Whirlwinds (1999–2000); Zhejiang Horses (2000–01); Zhejiang Cyclones (2001–2009); Zhejiang Golden Bulls (2009–present)
- Arena: Yiwu Gymnasium
- Location: Yiwu, Zhejiang, China
- Team colours: Crimson, gold, and white
- Head coach: Alexis Falekas
- Championships: None
- Website: ZJCZBC.com
Home	Away	Third

The Zhejiang Golden Bulls are a Chinese professional basketball team based in Yiwu, Zhejiang, China. It competes in the Chinese Basketball Association (CBA), in the Southern Division. Its corporate sponsor is Zhejiang Chouzhou Commercial Bank.

The team continued to be informally referred to as the Horses for quite some time, even after changing its nickname to Cyclones in 2001, largely because of the corporate sponsor during that era, Wanma (万马), whose name literally translates into English as ten thousand horses. The club plays most of its home games at the Yiwu Gymnasium but occasionally hosts contests at other locations in Zhejiang Province.

During the 2020–21 Chinese Basketball Association season, under head coach Liu Weiwei the Golden Bulls reached the semifinals for the first time in history. Two years later, in 2022–23, the Golden Bulls reached the CBA Finals for the first time and lost to the Liaoning Flying Leopards.

The Golden Bulls competed in the 2023 FIBA Intercontinental Cup Singapore as the representative team from Asia, as they were selected by the CBA. They finished in third place, becoming the first Chinese team to finish on the podium in the tournament.

== Past achievements ==
season	Regular Season (Win/Loss)	Win rate	Playoffs (win/loss)	Win rate	Season (win/loss)	Win rate	Average score	Average points conceded
95-96	11 / 12	47.83 %	1 / 3	25 %	11 / 15	42.31 %	71	76.46
96-97	10 / 15	40 %	3 / 3	50 %	10 / 18	35.71 %	68.82	75.14
97-98	9 / 19	32.14 %	6 / 0	100 %	9 / 19	32.14 %	70.39	78.21
98-99	10 / 12	45.45 %	0 / 2	0 %	10 / 14	41.67 %	101.62	109.21
99-00	13 / 14	48.15 %	5 / 1	83.33 %	13 / 15	46.43 %	99.21	101.14
00-01	12 / 15	44.44 %	5 / 1	83.33 %	12 / 16	42.86 %	103.79	105.14
01-02	15 / 11	57.69 %	2 / 3	40 %	15 / 14	51.72 %	106.24	106.48
02-03	14 / 12	53.85 %	0 / 3	0 %	14 / 15	48.28 %	106.48	110.79
03-04	9 / 16	36 %	3 / 3	50 %	9 / 19	32.14 %	96.32	104.79
04-05	11 / 27	28.95 %	0 / 0	0 %	11 / 27	28.95 %	88.61	96.47
05-06	14 / 25	35.9 %	0 / 0	0 %	17 / 25	40.48 %	97.88	99.76
06-07	20 / 11	64.52 %	1 / 3	25 %	20 / 14	58.82 %	93.47	91.62
07-08	12 / 18	40 %	0 / 0	0 %	12 / 18	40 %	94.9	96.97
08-09	14 / 31	31.11 %	0 / 0	0 %	19 / 31	38 %	100	106
09-10	14 / 18	43.75 %	0 / 0	0 %	14 / 18	43.75 %	98.66	101.5
10-11	19 / 13	59.38 %	0 / 3	0 %	19 / 16	54.29 %	96.46	94.23
11-12	15 / 17	46.88 %	0 / 0	0 %	15 / 17	46.88 %	100.19	101.66
12-13	16 / 16	50 %	0 / 3	0 %	16 / 19	45.71 %	108.63	110.09
13-14	13 / 17	43.33 %	0 / 3	0 %	13 / 20	39.39 %	109.52	109.48
14-15	7 / 20	25.93 %	4 / 7	36.36 %	11 / 27	28.95 %	116.05	122.89
15-16	17 / 11	60.71 %	5 / 8	38.46 %	22 / 19	53.66 %	107.88	109.85

== Honours ==
Chinese Basketball Association (CBA)

- Runners-up: 2022–23

FIBA Intercontinental Cup

- (bronze) Bronze medal: 2023

== Name progression ==
- Zhejiang Zhongxin Hangshou Squirrels: (1995–99)
- Zhejiang Whirlwinds: (1999–00)
- Zhejiang Horses: (2000–01)
- Zhejiang Wanma Cyclones: (2001–2009)
- Zhejiang Golden Bulls: (since 2009)

== Roster ==
Note: Flags indicate national team eligibility at FIBA-sanctioned events. Players may hold other non-FIBA nationalities not displayed.

Zhejiang Golden Bulls roster
Players
Coaches

Pos.	No.	Nat.	Name	Ht.	Wt.
G	0	(China)	Wang Yilin	1.90 m (6 ft 3 in)	83 kg (183 lb)
F	1	(China)	Meng Zikai	2.05 m (6 ft 9 in)	100 kg (220 lb)
G	6	(China)	Cheng Shuipeng	1.93 m (6 ft 4 in)	87 kg (192 lb)
G/F	8	(China)	Lu Wenbo	1.92 m (6 ft 4 in)	93 kg (205 lb)
F	9	(China)	Ou Yiyuan	2.02 m (6 ft 8 in)	95 kg (209 lb)
F/C	10	(China)	Liu Zeyi	2.01 m (6 ft 7 in)	103 kg (227 lb)
C	11	(China)	Yu Jiahao	2.21 m (7 ft 3 in)	130 kg (287 lb)
SF	12	(China)	Zhou Yishan	2.05 m (6 ft 9 in)	83 kg (183 lb)
F	13	(China)	Zhang Hongshuo	2.02 m (6 ft 8 in)	102 kg (225 lb)
F/C	14	(China)	Tang Rongze	2.10 m (6 ft 11 in)	100 kg (220 lb)
G	21	(China)	Jing Tianyu	1.89 m (6 ft 2 in)	84 kg (185 lb)
G/F	23	(China)	Duan Haotian	1.94 m (6 ft 4 in)	85 kg (187 lb)
G	24	(China)	Li Yuezhou	1.88 m (6 ft 2 in)	80 kg (176 lb)
G/F	25	(China)	Wang Zilu	2.02 m (6 ft 8 in)	91 kg (201 lb)
F	29	(China)	Zhang Jiaxu	2.04 m (6 ft 8 in)	87 kg (192 lb)
PG	32	(Latvia)	Artūrs Žagars	1.90 m (6 ft 3 in)	80 kg (176 lb)
G	33	(China)	Wu Qian	1.88 m (6 ft 2 in)	82 kg (181 lb)
C	41	(United States)	Dakari Johnson	2.13 m (7 ft 0 in)	133 kg (293 lb)

Head coach

- (Greece) Alexis Falekas

Assistant coach(es)

- (Greece) Thanos Konstantakopoulos
- (China) Jun Peng

Legend

- (C) Team captain
- Injured

- Roster
Updated: 1 October 2026

== Notable players ==
Note: Flags indicate national team eligibility at FIBA-sanctioned events. Players may hold other non-FIBA nationalities not displayed.

Criteria

To appear in this section a player must have either:

- Set a club record or won an individual award while at the club
- Played at least one official international match for their national team at any time
- Played at least one official NBA match at any time.

This is a list of the team's leading current Chinese and International players as well as notable former Chinese and International players.

=== Current Chinese national team players ===
- (China) Lu Wenbo (2017–present)
- (China) Wu Qian (2012–present)

=== Current Hong Kong players ===
- (Hong Kong) Duncan Reid (2017–present)

=== Current International players ===
- (United States) Justin Tillman (2022–present)

=== Former Chinese players ===
- (China) Ding Jinhui (2006–2016)

=== Former international players ===
- (Australia) Liz Cambage
- (Senegal) Maurice Ndour
- (United States) God Shammgod (2001–2002, 2007–2008)
- (United States) Peter Cornell (2003–2004)
- (United States) Isaac Fontaine (2004–2005)
- (United States) Soumaila Samake (2004–2006)
- (United States) Curtis Millage (2005–2006)
- (United States) Kevin Freeman (2006–2007)
- (United States) Kirk Snyder (2008–2009)
- (United States) Marcus Williams (2009–2010)
- (United States) Andre Brown (2009–2010)
- (United States) Josh Boone (2010–2012)
- (United States) Denzel Bowles (2012–2013)
- (United States) Mike James (2010)
- (United States) J.R. Smith (2011–2012)
- (United States) Eddy Curry (2012–2013)
- (United States) Quincy Douby (2012–2013)
- (United States) Jerel McNeal (2013)
- (United States) Dewarick Spencer (2013)
- (United States) Ivan Johnson (2013–2014)
- (United States) Mike Harris (2013)
- (United States) Brittney Griner (2013–2014)
- (United States) Errick McCollum (2014–2015)
- (United States) Chris Johnson (2014)
- (United States) Willie Warren (2015–2016)
- (United States) Charles Gaines (2016)
- (Iran) Samad Nikkhah Bahrami (2015–2016)
- (Haiti) Cady Lalanne (2016)
- (United States) Lorenzo Brown (2016–2017)
- (United States) Jarnell Stokes (2017–2018)
- (United States) Sonny Weems (2017–2022)
- (United States) Arinze Onuaku (2018–2022)
- (United States) Erick Green (2021–2022)
