= Amr Zahran =

Egyptian basketball player (born 2001)

Amr Zahran عمرو زهران
No. 0 – Al Ahly
- Position: Small forward
- League: Egyptian Basketball Premier League; BAL

Personal information
- Born: 6 October 2001 (age 24) Cairo, Egypt
- Listed height: 1.91 m (6 ft 3 in)
- Listed weight: 82 kg (181 lb)

Career information
- Playing career: 2021–present

Career history
- 2021–present: Al Ahly

Career highlights
- BAL champion (2023); 2× Egyptian League champion (2022, 2023)

Amr Alaaeldin Ibrahim Abdelhameed Zahran (in Arabic: عمرو زهران born 6 October 2001) is an Egyptian professional basketball player who plays for Al Ahly and the Egypt national team. Zahran won the BAL championship in 2023 with Al Ahly. He has played at the 2023 FIBA Basketball World Cup with Egypt. He was among Al Ahly squad that participated in FIBA InterContinental Cup 2023 in Singapore.

== Professional career ==
Zahran has played for Al Ahly since 2021, and has won two Egyptian Premier Leagues with the club. He won the 2021-22 championship.

In March 2023, Zahran renewed his contract with Al Ahly for four more seasons. He started for Al Ahly in their championship-winning 2023 BAL season. In the final, he scored 6 points and grabbed 3 rebounds, as Al Ahly defeated AS Douanes in the final. Zahran then also played in the 2023 Intercontinental Cup with the team.

In December 2023, Zahran suffered a torn ACL and was ruled out for the entire 2023–24 season.

== National team career ==
Zahran has played for the Egypt national senior team since the 2023 FIBA Basketball World Cup qualifiers, and also debuted in the main tournament. He averaged 7.8 points per game in the World Cup, as Egypt finished 20th.
