= Seif Samir =

Egyptian basketball player

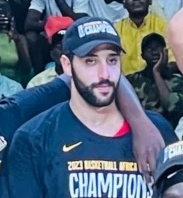
- Samir in 2023

No. 24 – Al Ahly
- Position: Power forward
- League: Egyptian Basketball Super League

Personal information
- Born: 5 June 1993 (age 33) El Dakahlia, Egypt
- Listed height: 2.05 m (6 ft 9 in)
- Listed weight: 95 kg (209 lb)

Career information
- NBA draft: 2015: undrafted
- Playing career: 2010–present

Career history
- 2010–present: Al Ahly

Career highlights
- BAL champion (2023); FIBA Africa Champions Cup champion (2016); 4× Egyptian League champion (2012, 2016, 2022, 2023); 4× Egyptian Cup winner (2011, 2018, 2022, 2023)

Seifeldin Samir Saad Said (born 5 June 1993) is an Egyptian basketball player for Al Ahly and the Egyptian national team, where he participated at the 2014 FIBA Basketball World Cup.

Said has played his whole career with Al Ahly, and has won the BAL championship in 2023, as well as the FIBA Africa Clubs Champions Cup in 2016.

Said was among Al Ahly squad that participated in FIBA InterContinental Cup 2023 in Singapore.
