= Egypt Basketball Super Cup =

Basketball Supercup

Egypt Basketball Supercup
- Organising body: Egyptian Basketball Federation
- Founded: 2002; 24 years ago
- First season: 2002
- Country: Egypt
- Number of teams: 2
- Related competitions: Egypt Basketball Super League; Egypt Basketball Cup
- Current champions: Al Ahly (2nd title) (2025)
- Most championships: Al Ittihad Alexandria (4 titles)

The Egypt Basketball Super Cup is a basketball trophy in Egypt. The winner is decided after one game between the champions of a previous season's Egyptian Basketball Super League champion and Egypt Cup winners. The competition was established in 2002.

== History ==
In 2021, Zamalek played with its Under-21 team as the team dealt with injuries and could not sign new players due to Egyptian Federation regulations.

On 24 December 2022, in the edition of the Super Cup, a stand in the Hassan Moustafa Sports Hall partly collapsed, injuring 27 people. The game was suspended and rescheduled for 12 January 2023, however Al Ahly conceded the game.

The 2023 Supercup was played in Bahrain, which was the first time the competition was held outside of Egypt.

== Games ==
The following is a list of all Super Cup games. Winners are indicated in bold with the number in brackets indicating the title number.

Year	Super League champions	Score	Cup winners	Venue	City	Ref.
2002	**Gezira (1)**		Zamalek	Cairo Stadium Indoor Halls	Cairo	
2004	**Gezira (2)**		Al Ahly	Cairo Stadium Indoor Halls	Cairo	
2019	Zamalek	83–93	**Gezira (3)**			
2020	**Al Ittihad (1)**	101–94 ^{(OT)}	Al Ahly			
2021	Zamalek	46–95	**Al Ittihad (2)**	Hassan Moustafa Sports Hall	6th of October	
2022	Al Ahly	45–66	**Al Ittihad (3)**	Hassan Moustafa Sports Hall	6th of October	
2023	**Al Ahly (1)**	64–60	Zamalek	Khalifa Sports City Stadium	Bahrain	
2024	**Al Ittihad (4)**	87–84 ^{(2OT)}	Al Ahly	Khalifa Sports City Stadium	Bahrain	
2025	**Al Ahly (2)**	89-85	**Al Ittihad**		Hurghada	

=== Performance by team ===
Team	Winners	Runners-up	Years won	Years runners-up
Al Ittihad	4	1	2020, 2021, 2022, 2024	2025
Gezira	3	–	2002, 2004, 2019	–
Al Ahly	2	4	2023, 2025	2004, 2020, 2022, 2024
Zamalek	–	4	–	2002, 2019, 2021, 2023
