= Hassan Moustafa Sports Hall =

Multi-purpose arena in Cairo, Egypt

- Interactive map of Hassan Moustafa Sports Hall
- Full name: Dr. Hassan Moustafa Sports Hall
- Former names: 6th of October Sports Hall (2020)
- Location: 6th of October City, Cairo, Egypt
- Coordinates: 29.9547°N 30.9160°E
- Capacity: 5,200 (sports)

Construction
- Opened: 2020
- Cost: £E1.5 million

The Hassan Moustafa Sports Hall (Arabic: صالة الدكتور حسن مصطفى بـ 6) is a multi-purpose arena in 6th of October City, Cairo, Egypt.

== History ==
The hall was opened in 2020 as the 6 October Sports Hall. It was constructed to serve as one of the venue for the 2021 World Men's Handball Championship in Egypt. In December 2020, Egyptian Ministry of Youth and Sports renamed the hall as Dr. Hassan Moustafa Sports Hall in recognition of the efforts of International Handball Federation President Dr. Hassan Moustafa to promote Egyptian sport globally.

On December 24, 2022, during the Egypt Basketball Super Cup between Al Ahly and Al Ittihad, a stand in the arena partly collapsed, injuring 27 people.

== Events ==
The hall hosted as venue for the 2021 World Men's Handball Championship. In 2022, the hall will host the 2022 FIBA Intercontinental Cup, which will be the first time the competition is held in an African country. Additionally, the regular season of the 2022 season of the Basketball Africa League (BAL) was hosted at the arena.

== See also ==
- List of indoor arenas in Egypt

Preceded by Estadio Obras Sanitarias; Buenos Aires	FIBA Intercontinental Cup; Final Venue; 2022	Succeeded by Pabellón Insular Santiago Martín; La Laguna
