= Amr Gendy =

Egyptian basketball player

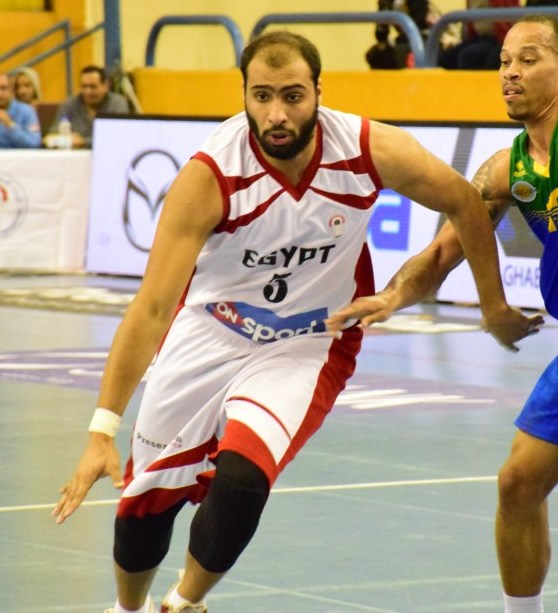
- Gendy with the Egyptian national team in 2017

No. 22 – Al Ahly
- Position: Guard
- League: Egyptian Basketball Super League

Personal information
- Born: 14 June 1991 (age 35) Cairo, Egypt
- Listed height: 1.92 m (6 ft 4 in)
- Listed weight: 87 kg (192 lb)

Career information
- NBA draft: 2013: undrafted
- Playing career: 2013–present

Career history
- 2013–2018: Gezira
- 2020–present: Al Ahly

Career highlights
- BAL champion (2023); 4× Egyptian Super League champion (2014, 2017, 2022, 2023); Egyptian Cup winner (2022,2023); Arab Club Championship winner (2021)

Amr El Gendy Abdelhalim (born 14 June 1991) is an Egyptian basketball player for Al Ahly and Egypt. He won the 2023 BAL championship with Al Ahly. He was among Al Ahly squad that participated in FIBA InterContinental Cup 2023 in Singapore.

== Professional career ==
Gendy played five-years for Gezira. He transferred to Al Ahly in 2020. On 27 May 2023, he won the 2023 BAL championship with Al Ahly.

== National team career ==
Gendy played for the Egyptian national team. He was most valuable player at African championship for juniors 2008 and best scorer, and where he participated at the 2014 FIBA Basketball World Cup.
