= Omar Oraby =

Egyptian basketball player

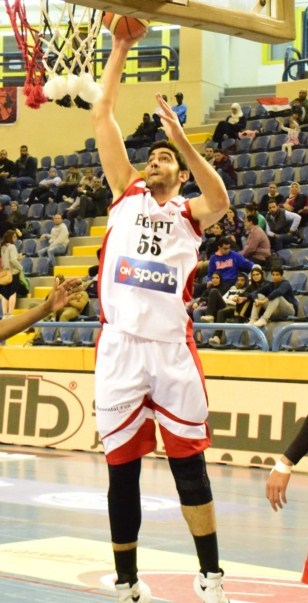
- Oraby with Egypt in 2017

No. 41 – Al Ahly
- Position: Center
- League: Egyptian Basketball Super League

Personal information
- Born: 8 September 1991 (age 35) Cairo, Egypt
- Listed height: 2.18 m (7 ft 2 in)
- Listed weight: 122 kg (269 lb)

Career information
- College: Rice (2010–2012); USC (2012–2014)
- NBA draft: 2014: undrafted
- Playing career: 2014–present

Career history
- 2014–2020: Gezira
- 2020–present: Al Ahly

Career highlights
- BAL champion (2023); 3× Egyptian League champion (2017, 2022, 2023); 2× Egyptian Cup winner (2022, 2023); Egyptian Cup Final MVP (2023); Arab Club Championship winner (2021)

Omar Tarek Saiid Oraby (born 8 September 1991) is an Egyptian basketball player for Al Ahly and the Egyptian national team. Standing at 2.18 m (7 ft 2 in), he plays as center.

Oraby has won the 2023 BAL championship with Al Ahly, as well as two Egyptian Leagues and two Egyptian Cups. He was the Egyptian Cup Final MVP in 2023. He was among Al Ahly squad that participated in FIBA InterContinental Cup 2023 in Singapore.

== College career ==
Oraby played college basketball for Rice and later USC Trojans.

== Professional career ==
Oraby started playing professionally in his home country Egypt with Gezira. He also played in the 2014 NBA Summer League with the Houston Rockets. When returning to Egypt, Oraby had to join military service. In September 2020, Oraby signed with Al Ahly.

On 27 May 2023, Oraby won the BAL championship with Al Ahly.

== Personal ==
Omar's brother, Mohamed, played handball for the Egyptian national team.
