= Anas Altikriti =

President of the Cordoba Foundation

- أنس التكريتي
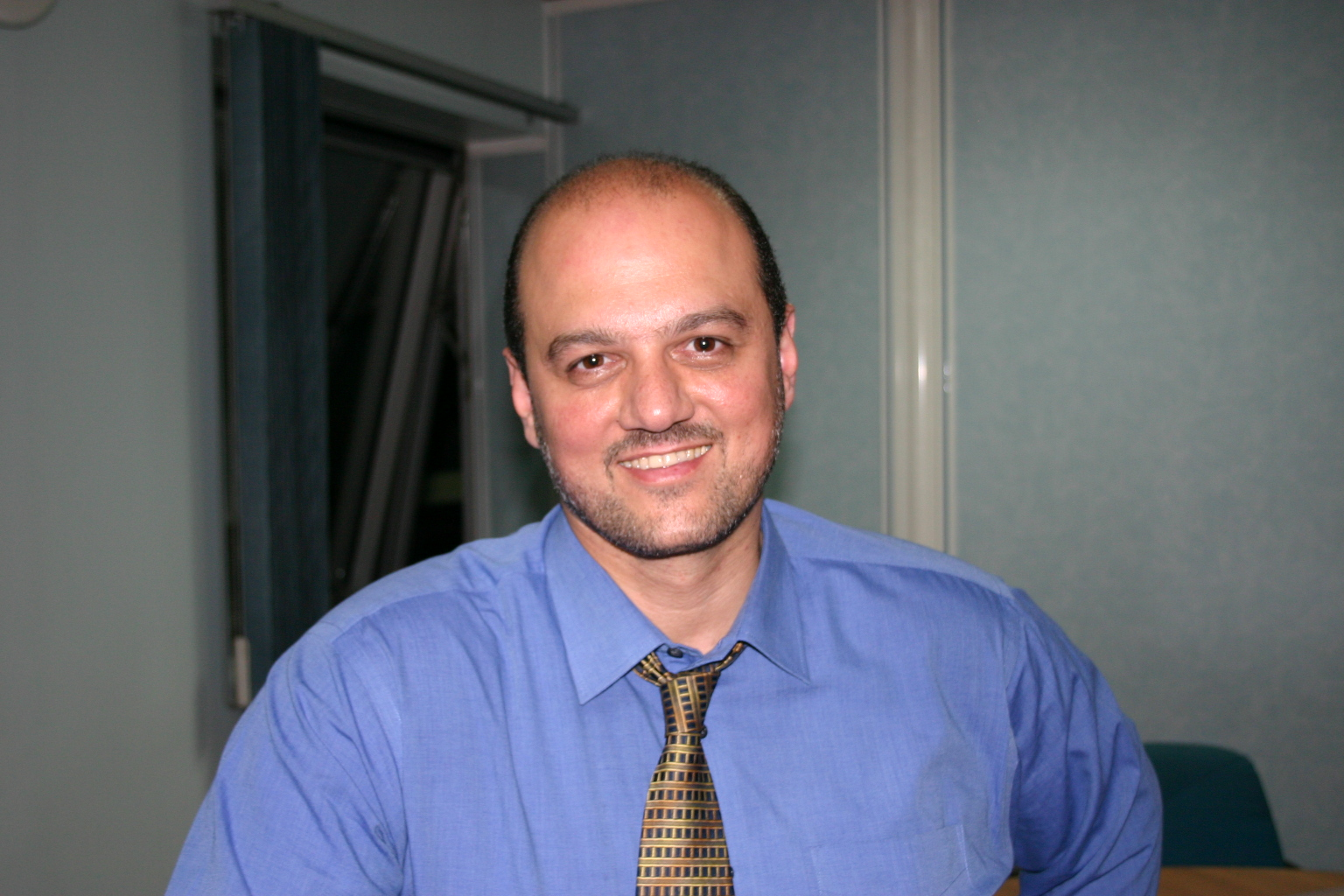
- Born: 9 September 1968 (age 58); Baghdad, Iraq
- Relatives: Osama Tawfiq al-Tikriti (father)

Anas Altikriti (Arabic: أنس التكريتي; born 9 September 1968 in Iraq) is a British Iraqi who is the CEO and founder of the Cordoba Foundation. The Cordoba Foundation describes its aim as "bridging the gap of understanding between the Muslim World and the West". Anas Altikriti himself is a hostage negotiator, who has successfully negotiated the release of 18 hostages from various conflict zones around the world, between November 2005 and October 2015.

The Cordoba Foundation has been criticized for its links to the Muslim Brotherhood and Hamas. In 2009 David Cameron, then leader of the opposition, made a statement during a Parliamentary Prime Ministers Questions, in which he alleged that TCF was a front for the Muslim Brotherhood. In late 2014 The Cordoba Foundation was listed as a terrorist group by the United Arab Emirates, along with the more than 75 various other international Muslim organisations which operate in a variety of fields. The British government opened its own enquiry into the Muslim Brotherhood. After a long delay, the report concluded that the Muslim Brotherhood should not be classified as a terrorist organization in the UK.

== Early life ==
Anas Altikriti was born into a Muslim family; his father Dr Osama Tawfiq Altikriti is a retired Consultant Radiologist who attained his Fellowship in Radiology from London in 1978. An opposition figure to the Ba'ath regime which came to power in Iraq in 1968, he eventually came to head the Muslim Brotherhood in Iraq for a number of years until the fall of the Saddam Hussein regime in 2003 at the hands of the US led invasion. In 2003, he retired from medicine and moved back to Iraq and served for 2 terms as a member of the Iraqi Council of Representatives on behalf of the Iraqi Islamic Party.

== Professional activities ==
Anas Altikriti holds an MSc in Translation and Interpreting. He teaches translation and interpreting on part-time basis at Leeds University.

Anas Altikriti became involved with the UK's Stop the War Coalition protests against the 2003 invasion of Iraq, becoming the movement's vice-president. He headed the Respect Party Yorkshire and the Humber slate for the European elections in 2004. Altikriti also served as president of the Muslim Association of Britain (MAB) between 2004 and 2005.

The MAB was "elevated from a relatively obscure group to national prominence" due to its association with the Stop the War coalition. After the 7 July 2005 London bombings, Altikriti found himself increasingly at odds with the MAB, many of whose members wanted a retreat from activism including involvement in the Stop the War Coalition in favor of educational/community development programmes. By December that year, Altikriti together with Azzam Tamimi had effectively lost control of MAB policy; in response, Altikriti helped form the British Muslim Initiative to maintain high-level political activism.

Altikriti was also the only officer of ICFR, Ltd., an advocacy organization.

== Media appearances ==
As a commentator in the International and Arab media (including BBC, CNN, ABC, SKY and Al-Jazeera) on Muslim and current affairs, he has appeared on HARDtalk and the Doha Debates (both with Tim Sebastian), Lateline on Australian ABC and BBC's Newsnight as well as a number of prominent programs on a variety of international channels. Altikriti has contributed a number of articles to The Guardian, Al-Ahram Weekly and Islam Online. He currently fronts a weekly debate show Sharqun Wa Gharb (East and West) on the Arab TV satellite station 'Al-Hiwar' (The Dialogue). In late 2005 and 2006 he made a number of trips to Iraq in efforts to release British hostage Norman Kember, who was eventually released in March 2006 by UK special forces.

=== Support for Syrian opposition ===
A supporter of the Arab Spring which spread throughout the Middle East and North Africa in the final days of 2010 and throughout the subsequent 3 years, Altikriti has been a consistent supporter of the Syrian revolution since it broke out in February 2011. Although consistently calling for the fall and legal prosecution of Syrian President Bashar al-Assad, Anas Altikriti has opposed Western military intervention as well as the meddling of Iran and its regional proxies in propping the regime in Damascus. Of late, he has declared his condemnation of the Russian military intervention in Syria. His efforts in supporting the Syrian people focused on the emergency relief, education and health sectors, while offering strategic training and media advice to various factions of the Syrian political opposition entities. Despite numerous invitations, Altikriti has refused to meet with or cooperate with any of the opposition military or armed factions.

=== Relationship with Muslim Brotherhood and Hamas ===
Altikriti has been a vocal supporter of the policies of Muslim Brotherhood parties across the Middle East and has been described as one of the shrewdest UK-based Brotherhood activists. In 2009, David Cameron, then leader of the opposition, made a statement during a Parliamentary Prime Ministers Questions, in which he alleged that TCF was a front for the Muslim Brotherhood.

Despite this reputation, Altikriti states that he is not a member of the Muslim Brotherhood. Anas Altikriti's father Osama Tawfiq al-Tikriti currently heads the Iraqi Islamic Party, the largest Sunni Islamist political party in Iraq which evolved from the Muslim Brotherhood. According to Al-Tikriti:

"'I was asked at a recent meeting with some of Washington’s wheelers and dealers about what the American government should do with the Islamic movements gaining prominence and claiming the limelight across the Arab world, I answered simply: support them … unless we encourage them and offer them an incentive, their own crop of hard-liners will have been proven right".

This has been interpreted as a new iteration of Altikriti's previous lobbying strategy, which has sought to persuade Western governments that they should fund Brotherhood groups as moderate alternatives to al-Qaeda. Altikriti has been accused of using the Arab Spring as a new opportunity to leverage the Muslim Brotherhood into positions of power and influence, and perhaps even to acquire new funds from Western sources, through arguing that Western support for the Muslim Brotherhood parties can undermine and moderate more extremist Islamist elements.

The Cordoba Foundation and British Muslim Initiative (BMI) have been criticized by Andrew Gilligan in The Telegraph for working "closely with other British extremist groups which seek the creation of an Islamic dictatorship, or caliphate, in Europe", referring to the Emirates Centre for Human Rights. Gilligan stated that Altikriti has close ties to Hamas leadership and co-founded BMI with a senior commander in Hamas, Mohammed Sawalha, and a Hamas "special envoy", Azzam Tamimi. A spokesperson from the Emirates Centre for Human Rights stated that "Anas Altikriti helped set up the Emirates Centre for Human Rights, but now has nothing to do with it."

In 2015, Altikriti reportedly stated that "the Brotherhood supports Hamas. I believe that if you are occupied you need to fight back." The UK government considers Hamas to be a terrorist organization since 2021.

In late 2014 The Cordoba Foundation was listed as a terrorist group by the United Arab Emirates, along with the more than 75 various other international Muslim organisations which operate in a variety of fields. The British government opened its own enquiry into the Muslim Brotherhood. After a long delay, the report concluded that the Muslim Brotherhood should not be classified as a terrorist organization in the UK.

=== Comments on Hamas ===
In a video recorded in November 2023, Altikriti was asked about the October 7 attacks and the Gaza war hostage crisis.

He said: “The taking of hostages is a very important part of any strategic sort of military action or act of resistance or the such because for every hostage you can then negotiate. You have personnel who are vital and crucial at least in your thinking and your mind to your adversary, to your enemy, so it’s a negotiating power".

In that video as well as on Twitter, he denied both the "mass slaughter of Israeli civilians" and the rape of Israeli women on October 7, calling both "a lie".

On 13 May 2026, Altikriti was denied entry to Canada, where he was planning to speak to the Muslim Association of Canada in Toronto; Altikriti says that the official reason given for his denial of entry was a failure to disclose a visa denial by the USA in 2023.

== Closure of bank accounts ==
Altikriti's UK bank accounts were closed by HSBC in August 2014 along with those of a number of Muslim organizations, including the Cordoba Foundation. According to the BBC, "the bank said it was applying a programme of strategic assessments to all of its businesses after a $1.9bn fine in 2012 over poor money-laundering controls." The only reason given for closure was: "the provision of banking service ... now falls outside of our risk appetite". The Charity Commission stated that it was not investigating any of the Muslim organizations with whom HSBC terminated its relationship.
