= 2021–22 Egyptian Handball League =

Egyptian Handball League
- Season: 2021–22
- Dates: 16 September 2021 – 31 March 2022
- Champions: Zamalek SC
- Top goalscorer: Ahmed El-Ahmar (180 goals)
- Longest winning run: 21 Game; Zamalek SC
- Longest unbeaten run: 33 Game; Zamalek SC

The 2021–22 Egyptian Handball League was the 66th edition of the Egyptian Handball League In this edition, 18 teams compete in three stages, headed by the holder of the last three editions of Zamalek.

== League system ==
The handball league system this season is divided into 3 phases: •The first stage: In it, 18 teams will participate in a league of one round, each team plays 17 matches, and the results of those born in 2002/2004 will be added to it. The teams are arranged after adding the legal points, where the first league 2002/2004 takes 9 points, the second 8.5 points, the third 8 points, and so on, then they are added to the original points of the men's squad and the teams are arranged on this basis. •The second phase: Teams are divided into three groups The first group includes the first 6 teams from the 18 teams in the first stage, the second group includes the individual ranking holders from the seventh to the 17th A third group includes the owners of the doubles ranking from the eighth to the 18th After the end of the stage, legal points will be added, the first takes 3 points, the second takes 2.5 points, and so on The third and final stage: It includes the first 4 teams, legal points will be added, the 1st takes 2 points, the 2nd takes 1.5 points, and The 3rd takes 1 points and the 4th takes 0.5 points and they play two combined rounds to determine the league champion, meaning that each team will play 6 matches in this stage.

== The first stage ==
=== Team 2002 ===
- Note The first team in the ranking gets 9 points, the second 8.5, the third 8, and so on until the last team gets 0.5 points.
- last update 10-11-2021

Team	Points	Team	Points	Team	Points
Zamalek	9	Sporting	8.5	Al Ahly	8
Bank Al Ahli	7.5	Tallaa Elgish	7	Al Shams	6.5
Smouha	6	Al Hiwar	5.5	Elteran	5
Gezira	4.5	Heliopolis	4	Ashab Aljead	3.5
Heliolido SC	3	Al Zohour	2.5	Olympic	2
Mansoura Stadium	1.5	6october	1	El Maady	0.5

=== Team 2004 ===
- Note The first team in the ranking gets 9 points, the second 8.5, the third 8, and so on until the last team gets 0.5 points.
- Final Group(2004)

Team	Points	Team	Points	Team	Points
Smouha	9	Al Ahly	8.5	Sporting	8
Zamalek	7.5	Elteran	7	Al Hiwar	6.5
Tallaa Elgish	6	Bank Al Ahli	5.5	Heliopolis	5
Ashab Aljead	4.5	Olympic	4	Heliolido SC	3.5
Al Shams	3	Mansoura Stadium	2.5	El Maady	2
Gezira	1.5	6october	1	Al Zohour	0.5

=== First Team ===
==== Group ====
Pos	Team	Pld	W	D	L	GF	GA	GD	Pts	Total Pts
1	Zamalek	17	17	0	0	658	467	+191	51	67.5
2	Al Ahly	17	16	0	1	608	419	+189	49	65.5
3	Sporting	17	15	0	2	565	454	+111	47	63.5
4	Tala'ea El Gaish SC	17	11	3	3	520	469	+51	42	55
5	Smouha	17	9	3	5	464	451	+13	38	53
6	Bank Al Ahli	17	10	0	7	450	412	+38	37	50
7	Heliopolis	17	9	3	5	468	444	+24	38	47
8	Elteran	17	6	2	9	430	472	−42	31	43
9	Olympic	17	9	1	7	472	480	−8	36	42
10	Ashab Aljead	17	5	3	9	445	486	−41	30	38
11	El Maady	17	7	3	7	446	468	−22	34	36.5
12	Gezira	17	5	3	9	423	475	−52	30	36
13	Al Zohour	17	6	3	8	447	474	−27	32	35
14	Al Shams	17	3	2	12	468	530	−62	25	34.5
15	Al Hiwar	17	0	4	13	370	487	−117	21	33
16	Heliolido SC	17	2	2	13	528	596	−68	23	30.5
17	Mansoura Stadium	17	2	4	11	439	525	−86	25	29
18	6october	17	2	2	13	492	584	−92	23	25

- Qualified for the second stage as a contender for the title in the group (A)
- Qualified for the second stage to avoid relegation in the group (B)
- Qualified for the second stage to avoid relegation in the group (c)

==== Results ====
Home \ Away	zam	hel	Sha	ahl	mad	ban	oct	Gez	Hiw	Man	Alj	Oly	tia	alz	GIS	Spo	Hey	Smo
Zamalek	—	33–31	44–32						44–23	48–31			36–19	39–26	42–31		46–39	
Heliopolis		—	30–23	24–28	32–30				24–21	28–24	30–33		27–28	27–27		32–37		20–20
Al Shams			—	24–32	33–23				20–20	33–25			23–28	23–32		31–41		25–29
Al Ahly	27–32			—	33–21	31–28	43–32	41–25			36–23	41–18				33–32		34–22
El Maady	21–32				—	20–21	31–24	25–25			27–25	24–24				26–36		30–27
Bank Al Ahli	24–29	22–24	30–21			—	32–26	21–18	31–24	29–22			28–19	21–25				
6october	26–45	28–31	32–28				—	25–25	29–29	31–33			27–38	23–33				
Gezira	24–41	20–26	26–22					—	24–22	24–24			27–22	28–29	27–32		30–28	
Al Hiwar				18–34	16–27				—	20–20	29–31	24–30	24–26	28–28	22–32	6–25		20–29
Mansoura Stadium				23–38	25–28					—	27–27	23–24	22–31	24–22		28–43		28–32
Ashab Aljead	27–43		31–31			25–28	29–28	26–27			—	30–28			18–25		29–28	
Olympic	29–33	21–24	29–28			28–24	39–33	29–22				—			26–32		35–31	
Elteran				21–43	27–28						22–22	26–32	—	24–23	23–24	23–30	30–30	23–26
Al Zohour				26–40	27–23						22–20	22–31		—	29–36	23–25	26–27	26–26
Tala'ea El Gaish SC		22–22	39–26		29–29	29–28	38–29			37–30					—			
Sporting	32–35					24–23	45–34	37–27			30–26	33–29			27–21	—	43–33	26–25
Heliolido SC		27–36	39–35	28–43	32–33	26–30	32–35		33–24	30–30					35–45		—	
Smouha	26–36					21–30	33–30	25–24			25–24	30–20			24–24		45–31	—

Updated to match(es) played on unknown. Source:
Legend: Blue = home team win; Yellow = draw; Red = away team win.

Win Draw Loss

== The Second stage ==
=== First Team ===
==== Group A ====
Pos	Team	Pld	W	D	L	GF	GA	GD	Pts	Total PTS
1	Zamalek	10	8	2	0	326	262	+64	28	39
2	Al Ahly	10	7	3	0	320	255	+65	27	37
3	Sporting	10	6	1	3	285	267	+18	23	32
4	Tala'ea El Gaish SC	10	2	1	7	254	295	−41	15	21
5	Bank Al Ahli	10	2	1	7	222	285	−63	15	20
6	Smouha	10	0	2	8	227	269	−42	12	17

- Qualified for the Final stage as a contender for the title
- Failure to compete in the league

==== Results ====
Home \ Away	zam	ahl	ban	Spo	GIS	Smo
Zamalek	—	29–29	28–20	36–31	31–30	29–28
Al Ahly	30–30	—	33–21	37–35	34–28	36–16
Bank Al Ahli	17–39	22–35	—	26–27	25–24	23–23
Sporting	26–29	26–26	31–27	—	26–24	29–21
Tala'ea El Gaish SC	22–44	25–36	26–20	23–28	—	26–25
Smouha	28–30	22–23	19–21	19–26	26–26	—

Updated to match(es) played on unknown. Source:
Legend: Blue = home team win; Yellow = draw; Red = away team win.

Win Draw Loss

==== Group B ====
Pos	Team	Pld	W	D	L	GF	GA	GD	Pts	Total PTS
1	Heliopolis	0	0	0	0	0	0	0	0	---
2	Olympic	0	0	0	0	0	0	0	0	---
3	El Maady	0	0	0	0	0	0	0	0	---
4	Al Zohour	0	0	0	0	0	0	0	0	---
5	Al Hiwar	0	0	0	0	0	0	0	0	---
6	Mansoura Stadium	0	0	0	0	0	0	0	0	---

- Stay in the first division
- Relegation to the second division

==== Group C ====
Pos	Team	Pld	W	D	L	GF	GA	GD	Pts	Total PTS
1	Elteran	0	0	0	0	0	0	0	0	---
2	Ashab Aljead	0	0	0	0	0	0	0	0	---
3	Gezira	0	0	0	0	0	0	0	0	---
4	Al Shams	0	0	0	0	0	0	0	0	---
5	Heliolido SC	0	0	0	0	0	0	0	0	---
6	6october	0	0	0	0	0	0	0	0	---

- Stay in the first division
- Relegation to the second division

== The Final Stage ==
Pos	Team	Pld	W	D	L	GF	GA	GD	Pts	Total PTS
1	Zamalek	6	5	1	0	201	169	+32	17	19
2	Al Ahly	6	4	0	2	159	157	+2	14	15.5
3	Sporting	6	2	1	3	161	166	−5	11	12
4	Tala'ea El Gaish SC	6	0	0	6	137	166	−29	6	6.5

- Champions

=== Results ===
Home \ Away	zam	ahl	Spo	GIS
Zamalek	—	34–28	38–28	34–29
Al Ahly	22–29	—	28–26	31–23
Sporting	36–36	24–26	—	25–21
Tala'ea El Gaish SC	26–30	21–24	17–22	—

Updated to match(es) played on unknown. Source:
Legend: Blue = home team win; Yellow = draw; Red = away team win.

Win Draw Loss
