= Muhammad Sawalha =

Palestinian activist

Mohammad Kathem Rashid Maruf Sawalha (born 21 July 1961), also known by the name Abu Obada, is a former leader of Hamas in the West Bank. He is the president of British Muslim Initiative (BMI) and currently resides in London. He is accused of supervising the allocation and supply of large amounts of money to Hamas operatives, an allegation that led to his being named in a 2004 U.S. indictment against Hamas operative Muhammad Salah.

In addition to his work with Hamas and BMI, Sawalha is a frequent guest on the Al-Hiwar television station, and is affiliated with numerous Palestinian and Islamic charities. He has had a hand in organizing several of the flotillas and land convoys attempting to reach the Gaza Strip, through which he has transferred financial aid. Sawalha helped found the Muslim Association of Britain.

== Activities in Britain ==
He was a founder of the Muslim Association of Britain (MAB), and ran it from 1999 to 2007. Later he served as chairman of the British Muslim Initiative. He was described on a Palestinian website as head of the International Committee to Lift the Siege on the Gaza Strip. In 2009 he reportedly was named deputy chairman of the Popular Committee in Support of the Palestinian People. He also signed the 2009 Istanbul Declaration affirming the Palestinian peoples right to resist the illegal Israeli occupation of their land.

Sawalha has been involved in organizing flotillas and land convoys to the Gaza Strip while in Britain. Additionally, a BBC program alleged that he had directed funds both for Hamas' armed and missionary wings.

== 2004 U.S. indictment of Salah ==
The United States Department of Justice named Sawalha as a co-conspirator in the 2004 indictment of Muhammad Salah. The indictment alleged that Sawalha continued to work for Hamas, holding secret discussions about terrorist acts in Israel, and aiding in the laundering of money to fund Hamas activities in the West Bank and Gaza. Sawalha reportedly told Salah explicit instructions as to how to dress and behave when distributing funds to local Hamas operatives.

== British Muslim Initiative ==
Sawalha is one of the founders of the British Muslim Initiative.

In 2009, demonstrators protesting the Gaza attacks clashed with police, and nearly all of the handful arrested were Muslims. Sawalha questioned this disproportion, and also questioned the detainees' treatment. He said the BMI "encourages Muslims to express their feelings and ambitions and frustrations only through political and legal processes. But if anything sends the message that Muslims cannot express themselves through political processes, and they will not be dealt with like others, it will give more strength to the fringes within the community who say democracy and the political system doesn't apply to Muslims in this country. This will only increase the frustration and sense of alienation among these people."

== Gaza flotillas ==
After the 2009 Gaza flotilla, Sawalha said that the next convoy would avoid the type of confrontation that had occurred with Egypt: "the confrontation will be directly with the Zionist enemy itself on the high seas." Sawalha organized the autumn 2010 LifeLine 5 convoy to Gaza, which reportedly delivered $5 million of aid.
