= 2015–16 Egyptian Handball League =

Egyptian Handball League
- Season: 2015–16
- Dates: 15 October 2015 – 4 May 2016
- Champions: Zamalek (15th title)

The 2015–16 Egyptian Handball League was the 60th edition of the Egyptian Handball League, which Zamalek crowned after an absence of five years.

== The final stage ==
Pos	Team	Pld	W	D	L	GF	GA	GD	Pts	
1	Zamalek	26	25	1	0	778	593	+185	77	(champions)
2	Al Ahly	24	17	3	4	778	539	+239	61	
3	Heliopolis	24	16	3	5	641	596	+45	59	
4	Smouha	23	13	3	7	555	527	+28	52	
5	Sporting	22	13	3	6	580	566	+14	51	
6	Tallaa Elgish	22	11	5	6	567	518	+49	49	
7	Ashab Aljead	23	9	3	11	546	572	−26	44	
8	Elteran	21	9	3	9	470	476	−6	42	
9	Gezira	22	8	4	10	517	539	−22	42	
10	6october	24	5	4	15	555	628	−73	38	
11	Al Shams	21	6	3	12	519	561	−42	36	
12	Olympic	22	5	3	14	526	576	−50	35	
13	Port Said	23	2	0	21	568	665	−97	27	
14	Asyut Petroleum	21	1	0	20	488	613	−125	23	

== Cairo Derby ==
The first round match of the final stage date= Sunday 8 November 2015

Team 1	Score	Team 2
Zamalek (Egypt)	30–29	(Egypt) Al Ahly SC

The second round match of the final stage date= Sunday 20 March 2016

Team 1	Score	Team 2
Zamalek (Egypt)	23–19	(Egypt) Al Ahly SC
