= 2009–10 Egyptian Handball League =

Handball competition

Egyptian Handball League
- Season: 2009–10
- Dates: 18 October 2009 – 12 May 2010
- Champions: Zamalek (14th title)

The 2009–10 Egyptian Handball League was the 54th edition of the Egyptian Handball League, which Zamalek crowned For the second time in a row.

== League System ==
The 2009–10 Egyptian Handball League system of The league is divided into three phases, the first phase is a combined cycle of 12 teams, they play two roles, the first 6 ascend according to the order of the second phase, the second phase is a round of one round, the teams are arranged through it and the first team gets six points and the second 5 points and so on and they qualify for the last phase They play a round of one turn and the one with the most points is crowned.

== The First Stage ==
Pos	Team	Pld	W	D	L	GF	GA	GD	Pts	
1	Zamalek	22	19	3	0	685	556	+129	63	Advance to the first final stage
2	Al Ahly	22	16	4	2	608	486	+122	58	Advance to the first final stage
3	Aviation SC	22	15	1	6	573	535	+38	53	Advance to the first final stage
4	Police Union	22	12	3	7	565	517	+48	49	Advance to the first final stage
5	Olympic	22	10	7	5	522	485	+37	49	Advance to the first final stage
6	Smouha	22	9	8	5	568	514	+54	48	Advance to the first final stage
7	Tala'ea El Gaish SC	22	10	5	7	544	532	+12	47	
8	Heliopolis	22	6	4	12	550	586	−36	38	
9	Gezira SC	22	7	2	13	513	558	−45	38	
10	Sporting	22	3	4	15	570	597	−27	32	
11	Asyut Petroleum	22	2	1	19	520	644	−124	27	
12	Port Said SC	22	2	0	20	508	716	−208	26	

== The First Final Stage ==
Pos	Team	Pld	W	D	L	GF	GA	GD	Pts	
1	Zamalek	5	3	2	0	120	113	+7	13	Qualified with (6) points for the final stage
2	Police Union	5	3	1	1	123	119	+4	12	Qualified with (5) points for the final stage
3	Al Ahly	5	3	0	2	123	112	+11	11	Qualified with (4) points for the final stage
4	Smouha	5	2	0	3	121	117	+4	9	Qualified with (3) points for the final stage
5	Olympic	5	1	2	2	114	121	−7	9	Qualified with (2) points for the final stage
6	Aviation SC	5	0	1	4	111	130	−19	6	Qualified with (1) points for the final stage

== The Final Stage ==
Pos	Team	Pld	W	D	L	GF	GA	GD	Pts	
1	Zamalek	5	4	0	1	147	133	+14	13	Total Pts (19) (champions)
2	Al Ahly	5	3	2	0	129	113	+16	13	Total Pts (17)
3	Olympic	5	3	1	1	109	109	0	12	Total Pts (14)
4	Smouha	5	1	1	3	114	126	−12	8	Total Pts (11)
5	Aviation SC	5	2	0	3	128	133	−5	9	Total Pts (10)
6	Police Union	5	0	0	5	105	118	−13	5	Total Pts (10)

After the end of the final stage, Zamalek was declared the winner of the Egyptian Handball League.

== Cairo Derby ==
First Match of The First Stage Friday 4 December 2009

Team 1	Score	Team 2
Zamalek (Egypt)	30–30	(Egypt) Al Ahly SC

Second Match of The First Stage Friday 19 March 2010

Team 1	Score	Team 2
Zamalek (Egypt)	25–23	(Egypt) Al Ahly SC

First Match of The Final Stage Saturday 1 May 2010

Team 1	Score	Team 2
Zamalek (Egypt)	21–19	(Egypt) Al Ahly SC

Second Match of The Final Stage Wednesday 12 May 2010

Team 1	Score	Team 2
Zamalek (Egypt)	24–33	(Egypt) Al Ahly SC
