= 2018–19 Egyptian Handball League =

Egyptian Handball League
- Season: 2018–19
- Dates: 20 September 2018 –28 April 2019
- Champions: Zamalek (16th title)

The 2018–19 Egyptian Handball League was the 63rd season of the Egyptian Handball League, which the team Zamalek won after an absence of two years.

== League System ==
The 2018–19 Egyptian Handball League system happens in two phases. The first phase divides the 18 teams into two groups, with the first four teams from each group advancing to the next round. The next round, a stage of one group, wins the most points. If both teams have the same number of points, a play-off occurs. Knowing that the teams heads of the two groups go up with four points, the seconds are two points, the third is a point and the fourth is a point.

== The first stage ==
=== Group 1 ===
Pos	Team	Pld	W	D	L	GF	GA	GD	Pts	
1	Zamalek	8	7	0	1	253	203	+50	22	Advance to the final stage
2	Heliopolis	8	6	0	2	221	207	+14	20	Advance to the final stage
3	Olympic	8	5	1	2	194	177	+17	19	Advance to the final stage
4	Sporting	7	5	1	1	209	182	+27	18	Advance to the final stage
5	Elteran	8	5	0	3	204	190	+14	18	
6	Al Shams	8	1	1	6	178	211	−33	11	
7	Ashab Aljead	7	1	1	5	178	187	−9	10	
8	Heliolido SC	7	1	0	6	170	203	−33	9	
9	Asyut Petroleum	6	1	0	5	150	197	−47	8	

=== Group 2 ===
Pos	Team	Pld	W	D	L	GF	GA	GD	Pts	
1	Al Ahly	8	8	0	0	220	174	+46	24	Advance to the final stage
2	Smouha	8	7	0	1	216	183	+33	22	Advance to the final stage
3	Tallaa Elgish	8	5	1	2	241	214	+27	19	Advance to the final stage
4	Gezira	8	4	0	4	216	195	+21	16	Advance to the final stage
5	Bank Al Ahli	8	3	1	4	217	210	+7	15	
6	Port Said	8	3	0	5	208	238	−30	14	
7	AlHiwar	8	3	0	5	184	217	−33	14	
8	6october	8	1	0	7	194	226	−32	10	
9	Al Zohour	8	1	0	7	168	207	−39	10	

== The final stage ==
Knowing that the teams heads of the two groups go up with four points, the seconds are two points, the third is a point and the fourth is a point Zamalek and Al Ahly have 4 points before The final stage began.

=== Final Group ===
Pos	Team	Pld	W	D	L	GF	GA	GD	Pts	
1	Zamalek	14	11	3	0	420	358	+62	39	Total Pts (43) (champions)
2	Al Ahly	14	10	2	2	378	335	+43	36	Total Pts (40)
3	Tallaa Elgish	14	6	3	5	379	365	+14	29	Total Pts (31)
4	Sporting	14	6	3	5	360	362	−2	29	Total Pts (31)
5	Heliopolis	14	4	3	7	382	410	−28	25	Total Pts (28)
6	Gezira	14	4	3	7	348	375	−27	25	Total Pts (26)
7	Smouha	14	2	5	7	351	368	−17	23	Total Pts (26)
8	Olympic	14	0	4	10	325	370	−45	18	Total Pts (19)

After the end of the final stage, Zamalek was declared the winner of the Egyptian Handball League.

== Cairo Derby ==
The first round match of the final stage date= Friday 1 March 2019

Team 1	Score	Team 2
Zamalek (Egypt)	23–23	(Egypt) Al Ahly SC

The second round match of the final stage date= Sunday 28 April 2019

Team 1	Score	Team 2
Zamalek (Egypt)	21–18	(Egypt) Al Ahly SC
