= 2009 Nineveh governorate election =

2009 Nineveh Governorate election
| ← 2005 | 31 January 2009 | 2013 → |

All 37 seats for the Nineveh Governorate council
- Turnout: 60% (▲43%)
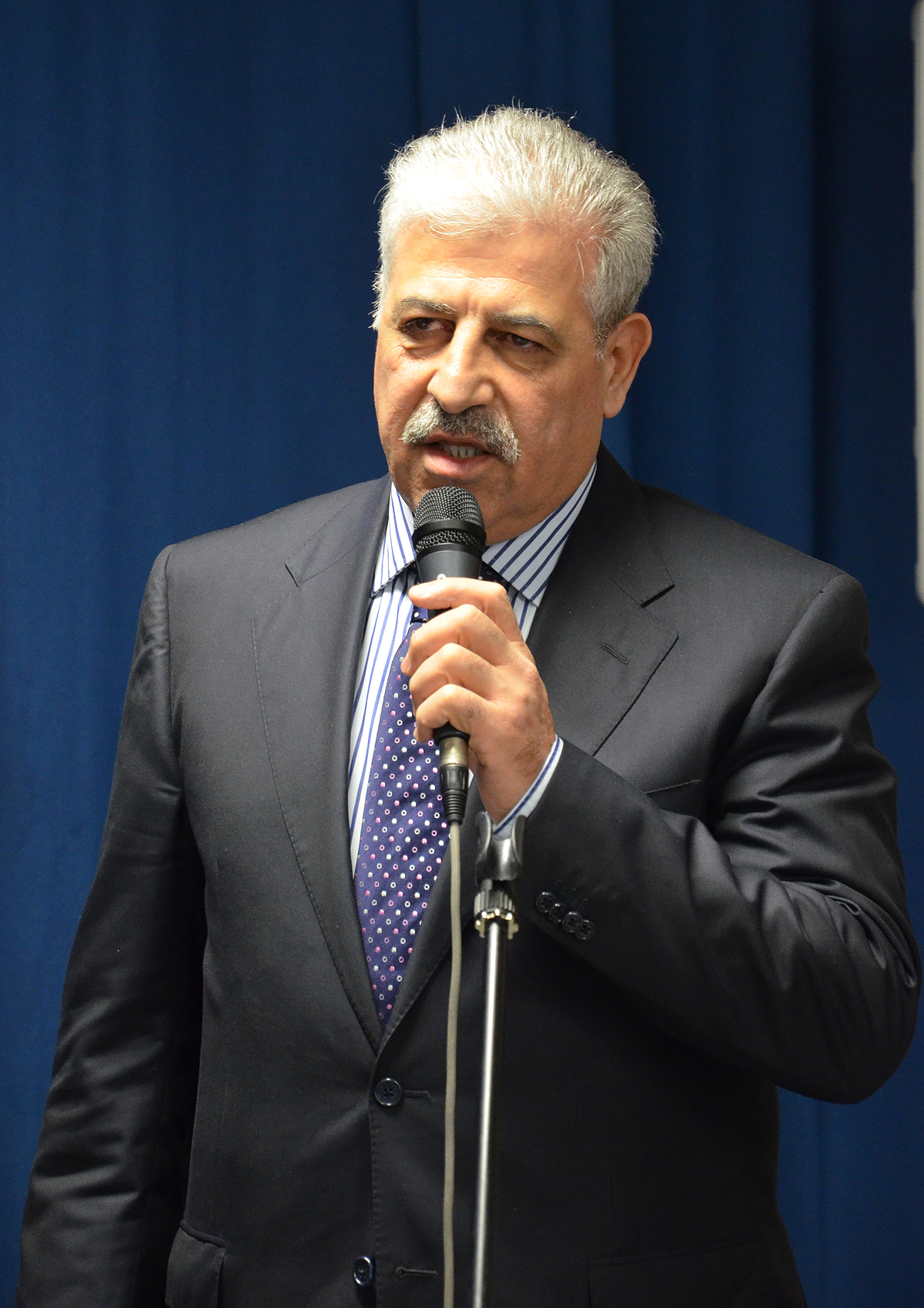

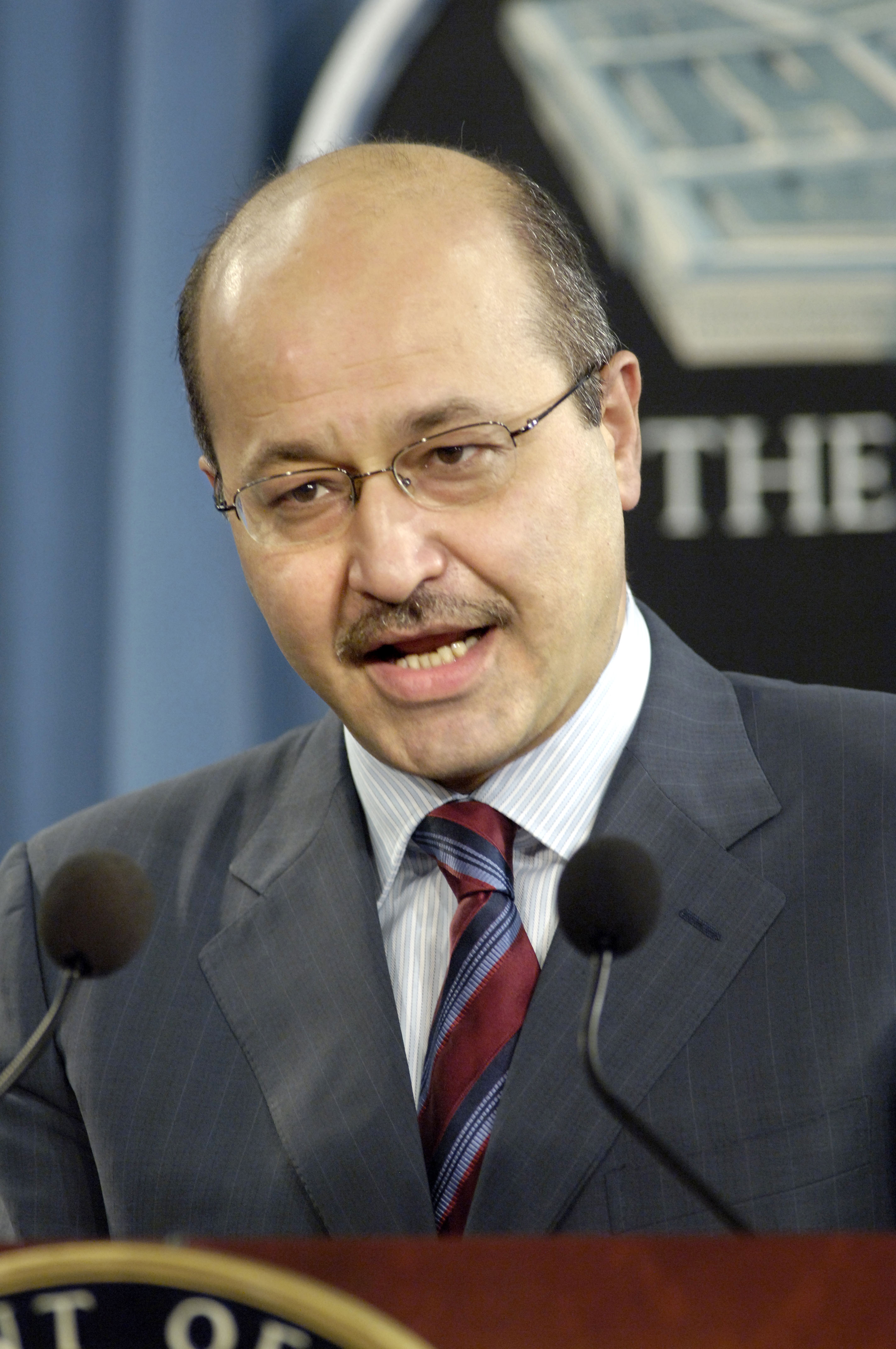

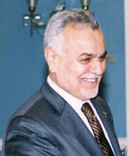
| | First party | Second party |
|---|---|---|
| Leader | Atheel al-Nujaifi | Barham Salih |
| Party | Al-Hadba | Kurdistani List |
| Last election | 0 | 31 |
| Seats before | 0 | 31 |
| Seats won | 19 | 12 |
| Seat change | ▲19 | ▼19 |
| Popular vote | 435,595 | 273,458 |
| Percentage | 43.8% | 27.5% |
| Swing | ▲43.8% | ▼38.4% |
| | Third party | Fourth party |
| Leader | Tariq al-Hashimi | Fahmi Yousif |
| Party | IIP | Ishtar Patriotic List |
| Last election | 2 | 0 |
| Seats before | 2 | 0 |
| Seats won | 3 | 1 |
| Seat change | ▲1 | ▲1 |
| Popular vote | 60,191 | 13,760 |
| Percentage | 6% | 1.4% |
| Swing | ▲1.74% | ▲1.4% |
Governor of Nineveh before election
Duraid Kashmoula
Independent
Subsequent Governor
Atheel al-Nujaifi
Al-Hadba

The Nineveh Governorate election of 2009 was held on 31 January 2009 alongside elections for all other governorates outside Iraqi Kurdistan and Kirkuk Governorate.

== Background ==
Three seats on the council have been reserved for religious minorities: one for Christians, one for Yazidis and one for Shabak.

In May 2008, arrest warrants were issued against a number of KDP council members who were accused of involvement in an assassination ring headed by the deputy leader of the KDP. The ring allegedly assassinated 900 people including a prominent Imam, two former senior officials of the Baath party, doctors and university professors. They were also accused of funnelled money and logistical help to al Qaeda in Iraq, in order to persuade the predominantly Arab residents to turn over security to the Kurdish Peshmerga.

== Campaign ==
The main contest in Ninawa was between the incumbent Kurdish-backed governor and the al-Hadba party, formed by Sunni Arab tribal groups and backed by the Shiite Prime Minister, Nouri al-Maliki. During the campaign the pro-Kurdish governor, Duraid Kashmoula, said he intended to leave Mosul, the city of his birth, after the election and retire to Kurdistan.

Al-Hadba complained of being targeted by Kurdish security forces. They accused the Kurdish parties of fraud in the 2005 election and, together with other non-Kurdish groups asked for federal troops to UN monitors to protect the voting centres. A candidate for the Sunni Arab "Iraq for Us" coalition was killed by a gunman who walked into a cafe and shot him. Just before the election another Sunni Arab candidate, this time from the National Unity List, was killed outside his home in Mosul.

Al-Hadba called for the removal of Kurdish peshmerga forces from Ninawa, saying many of the province's insurgent groups would become law-abiding after that. The Iraqi Islamic Party said the peshmerga should be replaced by the Iraqi Army within six months.

== Results ==
Usama al-Najafi, a member of the Council of Representatives of Iraq and a supporter of the al-Hadba party, claimed that they had won 60% of the vote, with the Kurdish list gaining only 20%.

After the election, reports claimed that Assyrians had been fired from their jobs because they were suspected of not voting for the pro-Kurdish Ishtar Patriotic List, which won the seat reserved for an Assyrian candidate.

| Party | Votes | % | Seats | +/– |
|---|---|---|---|---|
| Al Hadba National List | 435,595 | 43.77 | 19 | +19 |
| Kurdistan Alliance | 273,458 | 27.48 | 12 | −19 |
| Iraqi Islamic Party | 60,191 | 6.05 | 3 | +1 |
| Al Mihrab Martyr List | 17,915 | 1.80 | 0 | −5 |
| Ishtar Patriotic List | 13,760 | 1.38 | 1 | +1 |
| Reserved Shabak seat | 12,949 | 1.30 | 1 | +1 |
| Reserved Yazidi seat | 6,174 | 0.62 | 1 | +1 |
| National Rafidain List | 6,144 | 0.62 | 0 | −1 |
| Other parties | 168,983 | 16.98 | 0 | – |
| Total | 995,169 | 100.00 | 37 | −4 |
Source: Niqash, Al Sumaria, New York Times

== See also ==
- Assyrian politics in Iraq § Iraqi Governorate Elections 2009
