= Mohammed Shakir (Iraqi politician) =

Iraqi politician

Mohammed Shakir al-Ghanam (Arabic: محمد شاكر الغنام; born 1941 or 1942) is an Iraqi politician and leader of the Iraqi Islamic Party's center in the Ninawa Governorate. He formerly served as the official spokesperson to Vice President Tariq al-Hashimi, the highest ranking Sunni politician under Prime Minister Nouri al-Maliki. In 2009, he was a candidate in the Ninawa governorate election.
