= Osama Tawfiq al-Tikriti =

Iraqi politician (born 1939)

Osama Mukhlif Tawfiq al-Tikriti
- أسامة التكريتي

Secretary General of the Iraqi Islamic Party
- In office 24 May 2009 – 12 July 2011
- Deputy: Ayad al-Samarrai
- Preceded by: Tariq al-Hashimi
- Succeeded by: Ayad al-Samarrai

Personal details
- Born: 1939 (age 86–87) Tikrit, Iraq
- Party: Iraqi Islamic Party
- Relations: Anas Altikriti (son)
- Education: University of Baghdad; University of London
- Occupation: Politician

Osama Maukhlif Tawfiq al-Tikriti (Arabic: أسامة التكريتي) is a former leader of the Iraqi Islamic Party, a Sunni Arab religious party which was the largest Sunni Arab led party in the Iraqi legislative election of December 2005.

== Biography ==
Osama Tawfiq al-Tikriti was born in Tikrit, Iraq, where Saddam Hussein is also from. The two attended the same school. He studied at the University of Baghdad's Faculty of Medicine and graduated in 1963.

He started his career working in hospitals. He joined the Muslim Brotherhood in Iraq in 1952, and was an active member of the short-lived Iraqi Islamic Party when it was founded in 1960. In 1972, he moved to London to study radiology and remained three decades abroad to avoid an incarceration by the Hussein's regime in his country.

From 1978 to 1980, he worked at the Ministry of Health of the United Arab Emirates, and was head of radiology in the private clinic of the Emirates National Oil Company.

Osama Tawfiq al-Tikriti finally returned to Irak in 2003 after the US invasion, and became an active political figure. He succeeded Tariq al-Hashimi, Vice President of Iraq, as leader of the IIP when al-Hashimi left the party to form the Renewal List. Tikriti took over as Secretary General of the IIP on 24 May 2009. Ayad al-Samarrai was elected as his Deputy.

He was a member of the Council of Representatives of Iraq from Baghdad Governorate. He is a member of the CoR's Committee on Foreign Affairs.

Tikriti's son, Anas, is the former head of the Muslim Association of Britain.
