= British Muslim Initiative =

Islamic organization based in the United Kingdom

The British Muslim Initiative (BMI) is a UK-based Muslim organisation that describes itself as seeking "to fight racism and Islamaphobia, combat the challenges Muslims face around the world, encourage Muslim participation in British public life, and improve relations between the West and the Muslim world", and which "aims to provide a platform from which issues of concern to British Muslims, particularly those of a political nature, can be researched, analysed and highlighted." It has been described as affiliated with the Muslim Brotherhood.

In 2010, Muhammad Sawalha was the president of BMI. In 2013, Anas Al Tikriti was reported to be the leader or spokesman of the Initiative. Sawalha is a former Hamas commander and co-founder of the Global Anti-Aggression Campaign(GAAC).

The BMI was formed in 2007 by former leaders in the Muslim Association of Britain, Sawalha, Azzam Tamimi, and Al Tikriti. The group was founded as a "result of a conflict between traditionalists in the MAB who were unhappy with the high level of involvement" in British politics with the Green Party and Respect Party, "while those who formed the BMI wished such activity to continue." The organisation was set up by Daud Abdullah.
