= Maysoon al-Hashemi =

- مَيْسُون الْهَاشِمِي
- Born: c. 1946
- Died: April 27, 2006 (aged 60)
- Cause of death: Drive-by shooting
- Occupation: Head of Iraqi Islamic Party's women's department
- Relatives: Tariq al-Hashimi (brother)

Maysoon al-Hashemi (Arabic: مَيْسُون الْهَاشِمِي; c. 1946 – 27 April 2006) was the head of the Iraqi Islamic Party's women's department until she was shot dead, along with her driver, at the age of 60. This occurred shortly after she met with US Secretary of State Condoleezza Rice and Secretary of Defense Donald Rumsfeld.

She was the sister of former Iraqi Vice-President Tariq al-Hashimi.
