= ICFR, Ltd. =

- Type: Private company
- Founded: 2014
- Defunct: 2015
- Fate: dissolved
- Headquarters: London, United Kingdom

ICFR, Ltd. was a company registered in the United Kingdom. It was founded on 27 February 2014 and dissolved on 20 October 2015. Although officially classified as a "private company limited by guarantee without share capital", it was intended to act as an advocacy organization focusing on human rights. Its purpose was to "document cases of human rights violations and defend victims" through the use of domestic and international law and "UN human rights mechanisms".

In furtherance of this goal, it undertook public relations and lobbying activities "to impose pressure on governments" that violate human rights, and to provide "legal counsel and psychological support for victims of human rights violations". The company was empowered by its articles of incorporation to fundraise and to contribute to other charities in furtherance of these goals.

ICFR's official address was in Westgate House, an office building in London that houses dozens of businesses and charities. Several of these organisations have been tied to extremist groups including the Muslim Brotherhood and Hamas. The most notable of these is the Cordoba Foundation, which David Cameron, when prime minister, described as a "political front for the Muslim Brotherhood".

The only officer of ICFR was Anas Altikriti, who was a director. Altikriti, an outspoken supporter of the Muslim Brotherhood, is also the president and founder of the Cordoba Foundation.
