= Mohammed Shakir =

Mohammed Shakir may refer to:

- Mohammed Shakir (Indian politician) (born 1948)
- Mohammed Shakir (Iraqi politician) (born 1941)
- Muhammad Habib Shakir (1866–1939), Egyptian judge
- Mohammed Shakir (footballer), Iraqi goalkeeper (born 1996)
