= Egyptian Handball League =

Professional handball league in Egypt

- Organising body: Egyptian Handball Federation (EHF)
- Founded: 1957; 69 years ago
- First season: 1957
- Country: Egypt
- Confederation: CAHB
- Number of clubs: 18
- Level on pyramid: 1
- Domestic cups: Egyptian Handball Cup; Egyptian Handball Super Cup
- International cup: African Handball Champions League
- Current champions: Al Ahly SC (27th title)
- Most championships: Al Ahly SC (27 titles)
- Broadcaster(s): OnTime Sports
- Current: 2025–26 Egyptian Handball League

The Egyptian Handball League is the premier professional handball league in Egypt. It was founded in 1958. The league, which is played under CAHB rules, currently consists of 18 teams, including famous ones like Zamalek SC, Al Ahly SC, Sporting, Gezira SC and Smouha SC. The Egyptian Handball League was overseen by EHF.

== Champions ==
- The complete list of the Egyptian handball champions since 1957:

== List of champions ==
No.	Season	Champions	Runner-up
1	1957	Gezira SC	
2	1957–58	Gezira SC	
3	1958–59	Gezira SC	Sporting
4	1959–60	Gezira SC	
5	1960–61	Gezira SC	
6	1961–62	Gezira SC	
7	1962–63	Gezira SC	Navy Forces (ar)
8	1963–64	Gezira SC	
9	1964–65	Gezira SC	Al Ahly SC
10	1965–66	Gezira SC	Olympic Club
11	1966–67	Olympic Club	Gezira SC
12	1967–68	Aviation SC	Smouha SC
13	1968–69	Al Ahly SC	Gezira SC
14	1969–70	Gezira SC	Al Ahly SC
15	1970–71	Gezira SC	
16	1971–72	Gezira SC	Smouha SC
17	1972–73	Smouha SC	
18	1973–74	Al Ahly SC	Smouha SC
19	1974–75	Smouha SC	
20	1975–76	Smouha SC	
21	1976–77	Zamalek SC	Al Ahly SC
22	1977–78	Al Ahly SC	Sporting
23	1978–79	Zamalek SC	
24	1979–80	Ghazl Shibin El Kom	Al Ahly SC
25	1980–81	Zamalek SC	Al Ahly SC
26	1981–82	Al Ahly SC	
27	1982–83	Zamalek SC	Al Ahly SC
28	1983–84	Al Ahly SC	Zamalek SC
29	1984–85	Zamalek SC	Al Ahly SC
30	1985–86	Al Ahly SC	Zamalek SC
31	1986–87	Port Said SC	Zamalek SC
32	1987–88	Al Ahly SC	Port Said SC
33	1988–89	Port Said SC	
34	1989–90	Zamalek SC	
35	1990–91	Zamalek SC	
36	1991–92	Al Ahly SC	Zamalek SC
37	1992–93	Al Ahly SC	Zamalek SC
38	1993–94	Al Ahly SC	Zamalek SC
39	1994–95	Zamalek SC	Olympic Club
40	1995–96	Zamalek SC	
41	1996–97	Al Ahly SC	
42	1997–98	Al Ahly SC	
43	1998–99	Zamalek SC	Al Ahly SC
44	1999–00	Al Ahly SC	Zamalek SC
45	2000–01	Zamalek SC	Al Ahly SC
46	2001–02	Al Ahly SC	Zamalek SC
47	2002–03	Al Ahly SC	Zamalek SC
48	2003–04	Al Ahly SC	Zamalek SC
49	2004–05	Zamalek SC	Al Ahly SC
50	2005–06	Al Ahly SC	Zamalek SC
51	2006–07	El Gaish	Zamalek SC
52	2007–08	Al Ahly SC	Zamalek SC
53	2008–09	Zamalek SC	Al Ahly SC
54	2009–10	Zamalek SC	Al Ahly SC
55	2010–11	Cancelled	
56	2011–12	Cancelled	
57	2012–13	Al Ahly SC	Ittihad El Shorta SC
58	2013–14	Al Ahly SC	Sporting
59	2014–15	Al Ahly SC	Sporting
60	2015–16	Zamalek SC	Al Ahly SC
61	2016–17	Al Ahly SC	Zamalek SC
62	2017–18	Al Ahly SC	Zamalek SC
63	2018–19	Zamalek SC	Al Ahly SC
64	2019–20	Zamalek SC	Al Ahly SC
65	2020–21	Zamalek SC	Al Ahly SC
66	2021–22	Zamalek SC	Al Ahly SC
67	2022–23	Al Ahly SC	Zamalek SC
68	2023–24	Al Ahly SC	Zamalek SC
69	2024–25	Al Ahly SC	Zamalek SC
70	2025–26	Al Ahly SC	Zamalek SC

== Total titles won ==
Club	Titles	Years
Al Ahly SC	27	1969, 1974, 1978, 1982, 1984, 1986, 1988, 1992, 1993, 1994, 1997, 1998, 2000, 2002, 2003, 2004, 2006, 2008, 2013, 2014, 2015, 2017, 2018, 2023, 2024, 2025, 2026
Zamalek SC	19	1977, 1979, 1981, 1983, 1985, 1990, 1991, 1995, 1996, 1999, 2001, 2005, 2009, 2010, 2016, 2019, 2020, 2021, 2022
Gezira SC	13	1957, 1958, 1959, 1960, 1961, 1962, 1963, 1964, 1965, 1966, 1970, 1971, 1972
Smouha SC	3	1973, 1975, 1976
Port Said SC	3	1987, 1988 1989
Olympic Club	1	1967
Aviation SC	1	1968
Spinning Shebin	1	1980
Tala'ea El Gaish SC	1	2007

== See also ==
- Egyptian Handball Cup
