= Cordoba Foundation =

UK-based research and advisory group

The Cordoba Foundation is a UK-based research and advisory group with the stated aim of “bridging the gap of understanding between the Muslim World and the West”.

== History ==
The Cordoba Foundation was established in London in 2005 by Anas Al-Tikriti. Anas had previously served as president of the Muslim Association of Britain.

== Activities ==
The Cordoba Foundation carries out its mission through a variety of activities such as:

- Lobbying and public relations training for Muslim leaders
- Building and maintaining a global network of partners in Muslim communities worldwide
- Organising speaker tours and exchange trips for Muslim thinkers and students
- Research and publications on the themes of "Cosmopolitanism, Social Justice, Rapprochement of Cultures and Revisiting Theological Studies"
- Hosting conferences, colloquia and seminars on the group's key areas of focus

== Publications ==
The Cordoba Foundation publishes a variety of research papers and journals including:

- Arches Quarterly, a journal centred on analysis of current trends in Islamic-Western relations
- Occasional Papers, a series of policy papers featuring contributions from external experts and political leaders on the theme of cross-cultural exchange
- One-off reports on specific events or issues
- Tool kits for political activism, such as An Introduction to Effective Lobbying & Campaigning and Working with the Media: A guide for Muslim Groups.

== Links with terrorism ==
The leader of the Cordoba Foundation Anas Al-Tikriti has publicly supported Hamas and its methods. Anas Al-Tikriti was also cited as a supporter of the Muslim Brotherhood in a 2016 British House of Commons report. The Foundation was designated a terrorist organisation by the United Arab Emirates due to its links to the Muslim Brotherhood. The Foundation was also cited as having links to the Muslim Brotherhood in reporting by Aafreen Maksud and Andrew Gilligan for The Sunday Telegraph carried out in the run-up to the publication of the Jenkins Report, which gave the conclusions of an inquiry into the Brotherhood launched by British Prime Minister David Cameron.
