= Ayad al-Samarrai =

2nd Speaker of the Council of Representatives of Iraq

- إياد السامرائي

Secretary-General of the Iraqi Islamic Party
- Incumbent
- Assumed office 12 July 2011
- Deputy: Salim al-Jabouri
- Preceded by: Osama Tawfiq al-Tikriti

Personal details
- Born: 1946 (age 79–80) Adhamiyah, Baghdad, Iraq
- Party: Iraqi Islamic Party
- Education: University of Baghdad
- Occupation: Politician

Ayad al-Samarrai (Arabic: إياد السامرائي; born 1946) is a Sunni Arab Iraqi politician, who was the chairman of the Iraqi Accord Front parliamentary group, and since July 2011 is the Secretary-General of the Iraqi Islamic Party. He was elected as the Speaker of the Iraqi Parliament on April 19, 2009, and served until June 2010.

== Early life ==
Samarrai was born in 1946 in the Adhamiyah district of Baghdad. He graduated in 1970 from the University of Baghdad with a Bachelor of Science from the Mechanical Engineering Department.

== Exile ==
Samarrai lived in exile in Leeds Britain in 1995, when he was elected secretary-general of the party.

Prior to the 2003 Invasion of Iraq he was appointed to the American-backed opposition Follow-Up and Arrangement Committee.

== Return to Iraq ==
In September 2006, he was appointed as a member/ second deputy chairman of parliamentary review committee considering amendments to the constitution of Iraq.

In July 2007, he was elected head of the Iraqi Accordance Front parliamentary group, replacing Adnan al-Dulaimi.

On 24 May 2009, he was elected as Deputy of the Iraqi Islamic Party.
