= 2005 Nineveh governorate election =

Governorate election in Iraq

2005 Nineveh Governorate election
- 30 January 2005

All 41 seats for the Ninawa Governorate council
- Turnout: 17%
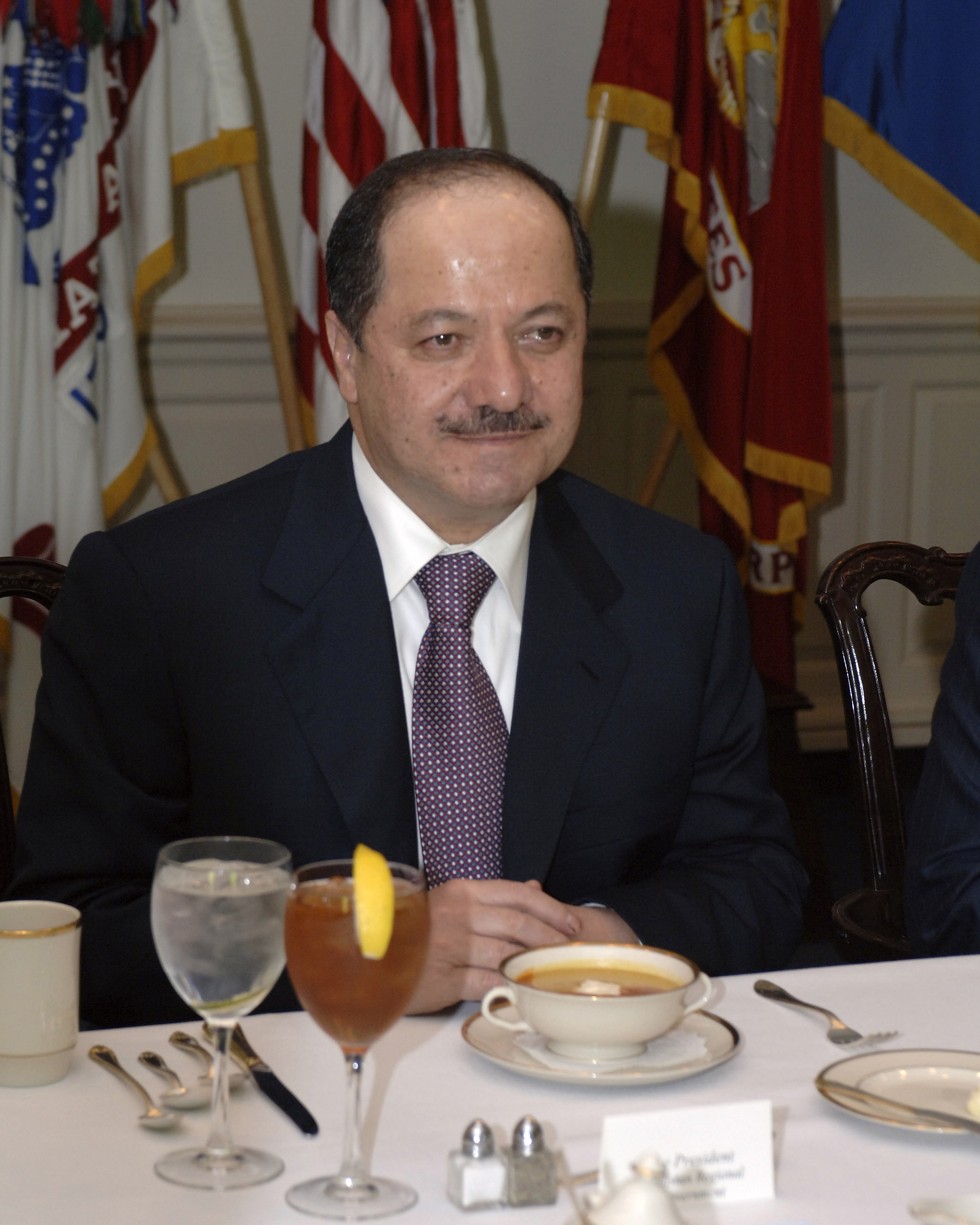

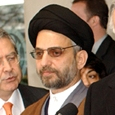

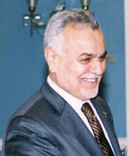
	First party	Second party
Leader	Massoud Barzani	Abdul Aziz al-Hakim
Party	DPAK	ISCI
Seats won	31	5
Seat change	▲31	▲5
Popular vote	109,295	17,255
Percentage	65.87%	10.4%
Swing	▲65.87%	▲10.4%
	Third party	Fourth party
Leader	Tariq al-Hashimi
Party	IIP	Council of the United Clans of Mosul
Seats won	2	2
Seat change	▲2	▲2
Popular vote	7,065	6,624
Percentage	4.26%	4%
Swing	▲4.26%	▲4%
Governor of Babil before election
Duraid Kashmoula
Independent
Subsequent Governor
Duraid Kashmoula
Independent

Governorate Council elections in the Nineveh Governorate of Iraq were held on January 30, 2005, alongside the national legislative election.

== Results ==
The province is predominantly composed of Sunnis and Kurds, with a significant Shi'ite presence. Despite making the vast majority, almost all Sunni Arabs boycotted the election, leading to the Kurdish party winning almost all of the seats.

The council voted to retain independent Sunni Arab, Duraid Mohammed Kashmula, to continue as governor. His brother, Usama Yousif Kashmula, had been appointed as governor of Nineveh Governorate in 2003 by the Coalition Provisional Authority.However, Usama was assassinated in July 2004, then Duraid succeeded him.

Party	Arabic name	Votes	Percent	Seats probable
Democratic Patriotic Alliance of Kurdistan	al-Qaima al-Watania ad-Dimoqratia al-Kurdistania	109,295	65.9%	31
Supreme Council for the Islamic Revolution in Iraq	al-Majlis al-Ala lil-Thawra al-Islamia fi'l-'Iraq	17,255	10.4%	5
Iraqi Islamic Party	al-Hizb al-Islami al-'Iraqi	7,065	4.2%	2
Council of the United Clans of Mosul	Majlis Ashair al-Mawsal al-Muhwahid	6,624	4.0%	2
National Rafidain List	al-Qaima ar-Rafidain al-Watania	4,650	2.8%	1
Iraqi National Unity Assembly	Tajammu al-Wahida al-Watania al-'Iraqi	3,908	2.3%	0
Reconciliation and Liberation Bloc	Kutla al-Musalaha wa't-Tahrir	3,352	2.0%	0
Turkoman Front of Iraq	Jubha Turkoman al-'Iraq	2,994	1.8%	0
Iraqi Independent Group	al-Hia al-'iraqia al-Mustaqila	2,607	1.6%	0
Democratic Two Rivers Alliance	Aintlaf ar-Rafidain ad-Dimuqrati	2,315	1.4%	0
National Front for the Unity of Iraq	al-Jabha al-Watania li-Wahidat al-'Iraq	2,092	1.3%	0
Iraqi Communist Party	al-Hizb ash-Shuyu'i al-'Iraqi	1,041	0.6%	0
National League of Leaders and Sheiks of Iraqi Clans – National Clans Organization		903	0.5%	0
Party of the Chaldean Democratic Union	Hizb al-Ittihad ad-Dimuqrati al-Kaldani	750	0.4%	0
Democratic Construction Party	Hizb al-Bina' ad-Dimuqrati	560	0.3%	0
Kurdistan Conservative Party	Hizb al-Muhafizeen al-Kurdistani	523	0.3%	0
Total valid votes:		165,934	100%	41
Invalid votes:		864		
