= Muslim Brotherhood in Iraq =

Muslim Brotherhood of Iraq الإخوان المسلمون في العراق
- Leader: Ziad Shafiq al-Rawi
- Founders: Abdul Aziz al-Badri
- Founded: 1940
- Legalised: 1949 (as the Islamic Brotherhood Association); 1963; 2003
- Banned: 1961; 1968
- Headquarters: Baghdad
- Armed wing: Hamas of Iraq (2007-2011, unclear)
- Political wing: Islamic Party
- Membership: 5,000
- Ideology: Pan-Islamism; Sunni Islamism
- Political position: Right-wing
- International affiliation: Muslim Brotherhood

Party flag

The Muslim Brotherhood in Iraq (Arabic: الإخوان المسلمون في العراق, romanized: al-Ikhwān al-Muslimūn fī al-ʿIrāq) is an Iraqi branch of the Sunni Islamist Muslim Brotherhood organization. The group was founded in 1940, and became legal in 1949 under the name of the Islamic Brotherhood Association.
