= Azzam Tamimi =

British-Palestinian presenter and activist

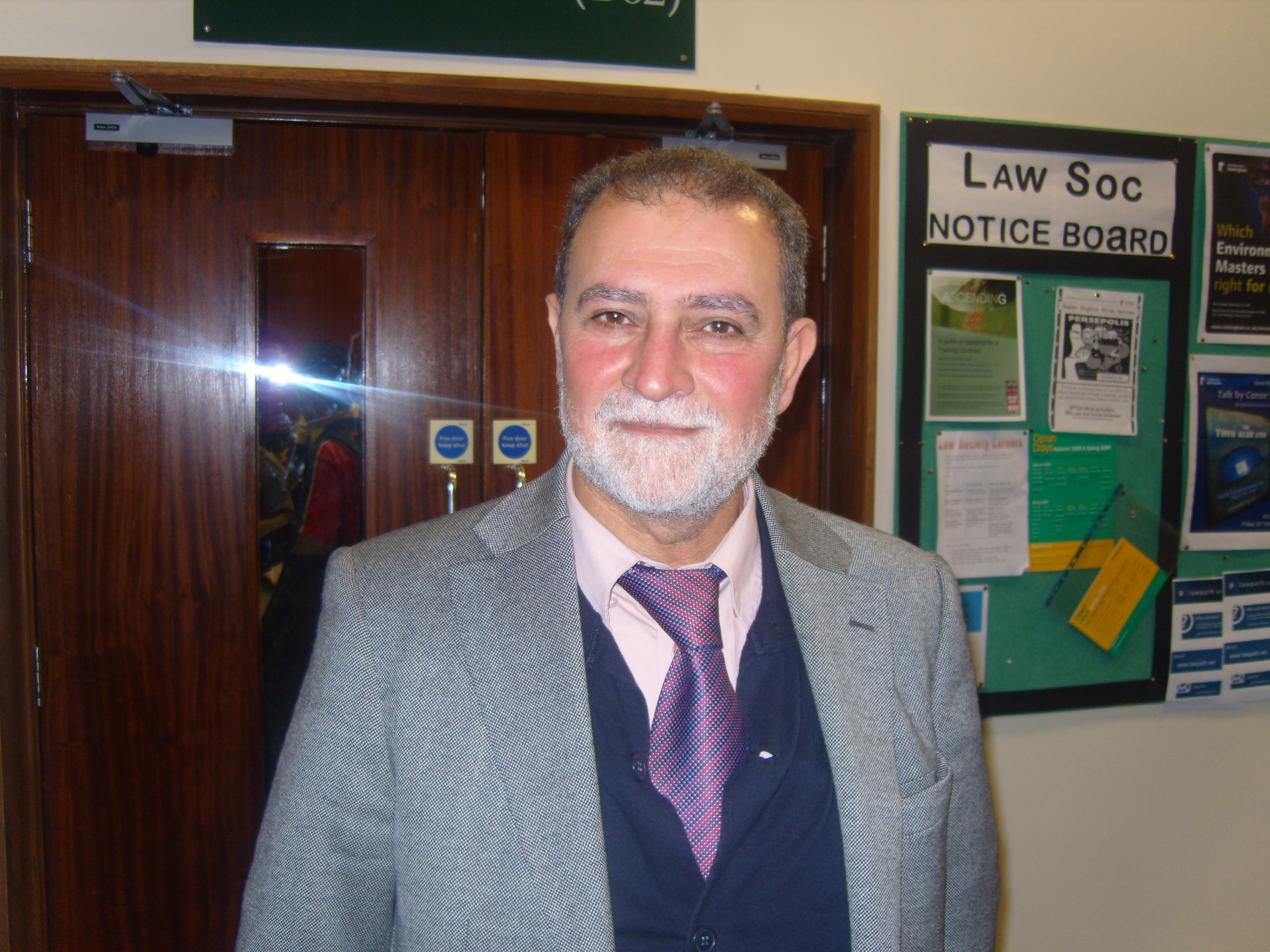
Dr. Azzam Tamimi, November 2008.

Azzam Tamimi (sometimes spelled Azam Tamimi; Arabic: عزام التميمي; born 1955, Hebron, West Bank) is a British-Palestinian Jordanian academic and political activist. He is currently a freelance presenter at Alhiwar TV Channel. He headed the Institute of Islamic Political Thought until 2008. Tamimi has written several books on Middle Eastern and Islamic politics, including "Power-Sharing Islam", "Islam and Secularism in the Middle East", Rachid Ghannouchi, Democrat within Islamism and Hamas: A History from Within.

== Early life and education ==
Tamimi was born in 1955 and lived in Hebron in the West Bank—then under the control of Jordan, hence his Jordanian citizenship—until he was seven. His family then moved to Kuwait. His father was a resistance fighter against the Zionist forces during the 1948 Palestine war.

After high school, Tamimi moved to London to attend college. In 1979, he received a Bachelor of Science degree in Combined Sciences from the University of Sunderland. In 1998 he completed a PhD in Political Theory from the University of Westminster.

== Career ==
In addition to his involvement with television, he has written for such publications as The Guardian. He is also an author of various books.

=== Finsbury Park Mosque reformation ===
In 2005, Tamimi led a group of trustees in reforming the Finsbury Park Mosque, which was previously under the control of Abu Hamza al-Masri.

== Political positions ==
=== War on terror ===
Tamimi has pointed out that the war on terror launched by the United States and its allies in the wake of September 11 attacks has been perceived by many in the Islamic world as a war on Islam. He accused American President George W. Bush of attempting to stop terrorism through war, political oppression, and violations of human rights, arguing that this would not work and would instead have the opposite effect.

=== Israeli-Palestinian conflict ===
In 2004, Tamimi stated that, as a Jordanian, he would never confer legitimacy upon Israel, "a state that is created on land robbed from my father, from my grandfather and from my mother". He also classifies Zionism as a racist ideology.

Nonetheless, Tamimi favours talks between Hamas and Israel, believing that co-existence between Palestinians and Israel may be possible. He has stated that "peace may still be achieved by talking about how to co-exist." Elaborating on this he has also said that "Hamas would only agree to a negotiated settlement based on the idea of a hudna (longterm ceasefire). In reality, of course, that would mean recognising Israel will exist within agreed-upon borders for a given period of time. It does not, however, mean recognising that where Israel sits is no longer Palestinian". For the long run, Tamimi advocates what he calls a post-apartheid South African solution, in which Israel "is dissolved just like apartheid was, and all people within mandatory Palestine become equal citizens".

He believes that antisemitism in Arab societies can be attributed to a response to modern political Zionism and that it is an aberration of traditional Islamic practices.

In January 2006, Tamimi wrote that if Israel withdrew from territories occupied in 1967, Hamas would end its armed resistance.

Shortly before the invasion of the Gaza Strip by Israel in late 2008, Tamimi argued for continuation of a truce that had been maintained for five months between Hamas and Israel and for ending Israel's Blockade of the Gaza Strip, which he described as a "siege".

==== Martyrdom ====
In November 2004, while being interviewed for the BBC programme Hardtalk, Tamimi said that sacrificing his life for justice for Palestine would be "a noble cause. It is the straight way to pleasing my God and I would do it if I had the opportunity". On 28 February 2012, Tamimi appeared at a Palestinian event at Queen Mary, University of London. Tamimi said: "I’d be a martyr for my country, of course", adding that "if you’re not prepared to die for your country, then you are not a patriot".
