= Tariq al-Hashimi =

9th Vice President of Iraq

- طَارِق الْهَاشِمِي
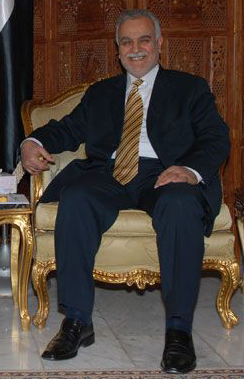
- Al-Hashimi in 2009

Vice President of Iraq
- In office 22 April 2006 – 10 September 2012 Serving with Khodair al-Khozaei (after 2011)
- President: Jalal Talabani
- Preceded by: Ghazi al-Yawer and Adil Abdul-Mahdi
- Succeeded by: Khodair al-Khozaei

Leader of the Iraqi Islamic Party
- In office 2004 – 24 May 2009
- Succeeded by: Osama Tawfiq al-Tikriti

Personal details
- Born: 1942 (age 83–84) Baghdad, Iraq
- Party: Renewal List-Iraqi National Movement
- Relations: Maysoon al-Hashemi (sister)
- Occupation: Politician
- Profession: Army officer

Military service
- Allegiance: Ba'athist Iraq
- Branch/service: Iraqi Army
- Years of service: 1962–1975
- Rank: Lieutenant Colonel
- Unit: Artillery

Tariq al-Hashimi (Arabic: طَارِق الْهَاشِمِي, romanized: Ṭāriq al-Hāshimī; born 1942) is an Iraqi politician who served as the general secretary of the Iraqi Islamic Party (IIP) until May 2009. He served as the vice president of Iraq from 2006 to 2012. As a Sunni, he took the place of fellow Sunni politician Ghazi al-Yawar.

== Early life ==
Tariq al-Hashimi was born to Sunni Arab parents in 1942 in Baghdad, Iraq, in the Mashhadan tribe. From 1959 to 1962, he studied at the Baghdad Military Academy. He was commissioned as a lieutenant in an artillery battalion of an armoured brigade in 1962. He earned a bachelor's degree in economics from Al-Mustansiriya University in 1969, and a master's degree in 1978. At the age of 33, he left the Iraqi Army, and became active in the Iraqi Islamic Party (IIP), serving on its planning committee. He is the brother of Maysoon al-Hashemi, who was killed on 27 April 2006 and Amir al-Hashimi, who was killed on 9 October 2006.

== Political career and views ==
Hashimi was the leader of the largest Sunni block, Iraqi Accord Front led by the Iraqi Islamic Party (IIP). The block entered the 2005 elections, but withdrew later. Hashimi opposes federalism, wants oil revenues distributed based on population, de-Baathification reversed, and more Sunnis in the new military and police. In fact, Hashimi argued that the inhabitants of the provinces could take the decision whether or not to form federal regions.

USA Today reported in December 2006 that Hashimi was involved in forming a multi-sectarian alliance to replace the government of Prime Minister Nouri al-Maliki, with the encouragement of U.S. President George W. Bush, to counter the political influence of Muqtada al-Sadr. At a meeting with Turkish Prime Minister Recep Tayyip Erdogan in 2007, Hashimi said that the Iraqi government was prepared to cooperate with Turkey in the Turkish fight against Kurdish Workers Party.

In December 2006, Hashimi differentiated between Al-Qaeda and the other fighters that America calls "insurgents", and that Iraqis call the "resistance", noting that the latter "are very much prepared to contribute to and participate in the political process, as long as we offer them a doable, workable, significant project to accommodate them". In the same discussion, he said violence in Iraq was a result of the American military presence there and that calm would follow if America set a timetable for withdrawal.

In 2007, Hashimi drafted the "Iraqi National Compact", a 25‑point statement of principles that condemn all forms of extremism and sectarian discrimination. The compact calls for serious dialogue between the factions in Iraq. Hashimi announced plans to pull his political bloc out of the government and resign as vice-president on 15 May if promised constitutional changes were not made. The other reason for his intention to resign was that according to Hashimi, Maliki had been excluding Sunnis from decision-making.

During his tenure as vice-president, Hashimi maintained an office located in the Yarmouk neighborhood of Baghdad.

Hashimi stepped down as secretary general of the IIP in May 2009, and Osama al Tikriti was elected to fill the position. Then Hashimi established the non-sectarian Tajdeed (Renewal) List.

== Accusations and arrest warrant ==
On 15 December 2011, government forces surrounded Tariq al-Hashimi's residence in the Green Zone and two of his bodyguards were detained and beaten. On 18 December, five more of his bodyguards were arrested. The Iraqi government banned him from travelling abroad. In addition, on 19 December 2011, Iraq's Judicial Council issued an arrest warrant for Hashimi, accusing him of orchestrating attacks. The arrest warrant was based on the testimony of his bodyguards, who were badly beaten and forced to make these accusations against him, and came just one day after the final U.S. troop withdrawal of remaining forces from Iraq. More specifically, Hashimi was accused of running a hit squad and killing Shiite government officials. One day later, Hashimi denied all charges against him in a press conference in the Kurdish regional capital Erbil, to which he had fled on 18 December 2011 after being informed about the arrest warrant against him. The dispute between the Sunni Muslim Hashimi and the primarily Shia administration of Prime Minister Maliki generated concern over the stability of the young Iraqi government amid the ongoing sectarian conflict. After the arrest warrant, the Sunni/Shia Iraqiyya party with 91 seats in parliament began a boycott that led to a standstill in the government. This boycott was only over in late January 2012 as a result of the United States' intense diplomatic pressure and efforts.

On 8 January 2012, the Iraqi Ministry of Interior asked the Kurdish region's Interior Ministry to extradite Hashimi to Baghdad. During the same period, Hashimi's office in Baghdad declared that fifty-three of his bodyguards and employees had been detained by the Iraqi authorities. Hashimi officially demanded that his trial would be in Kirkuk instead of in Baghdad due to safety concerns and higher possibility of fair trial. However, his request was rejected by the federal court on 15 January. President of Kurdistan Massoud Barzani declared in March 2012 that the Kurdistan Regional Government would not hand over Hashimi to Iraqi authorities because Kurdish ethics prevented them from doing so. Hashimi denied all charges and claimed constitutional immunity from the prosecution. Then Hashimi began his visits to three countries, namely Qatar, Saudi Arabia and Turkey. In each visit, he was received as vice president of Iraq.

On 1 April 2012, Hashimi was allowed by the authorities in Kurdistan to travel to Qatar to meet with Sheikh Hamad bin Khalifa Al Thani, on what the Qatari administration described as an official diplomatic visit. Iraqi deputy prime minister Hussain al-Shahristani denounced the visit as unacceptable on Qatar's part and called for Hashimi to be immediately handed over. However, Qatar refused the request of the Iraq government to extradite Hashimi, stating that extradition would be against diplomatic norms. Later, Hashimi went to Saudi Arabia and met with Saudi Foreign Minister Prince Saud Al Faisal. Then, on 10 April, Hashemi travelled to Turkey, and was given refuge with his family.

On 8 May 2012, Interpol issued a red notice for his arrest upon the request of the Iraq government. The Turkish deputy prime minister stated that Hashimi would not be extradited. The Turkish government granted a residence permit for Hashimi.

On October, 8th 2013 INTERPOL canceled the red notice against Al Hashimi and distributed the decision to all member States. The INTERPOL's decision read "The International Criminal Police Organization Secretariat has fully investigated the allegations against Tareq Al Hashimi. The Organizations' Secretariat believes the Iraqi government's request lacks legal justification. The Iraqi government has submitted information and documents which lacked quality. Therefore; the INTERPOL's Secretariat has decided on October, 8th 2013 to cancel the red notice against Al Hashimi and distribute the decision to all member States".

== Trial ==
In February 2012, a panel of Iraqi judges accused him of leading paramilitary teams to coordinate more than 150 attacks in the past six years mostly against his political opponents, Iraqi security officials and religious pilgrims. Based on these accusations, the trial for Hashimi and his son-in-law, Ahmed Qahtan (who was also his secretary), began in May 2012. The charges against them included the murders of a female lawyer and a Shia brigadier-general. In addition, the trial also covered 150 charges against Hashimi and his bodyguards due to their alleged involvement in attacks which occurred after the invasion of Iraq. Hashimi and his son-in-law were tried in absentia. In the court, Hashimi's bodyguards declared that they had been ordered and paid by him to perform the attacks.

On 9 September 2012, he and his son-in-law were sentenced to death based on the verdict of the Central Criminal Court of Iraq that found him guilty of two murders. Abdul Sattar al-Berqdar, a spokesman for Iraq's Supreme Judicial Council, said that Hashimi was sentenced to hang "because he was involved directly in killing a female lawyer and a general with the Iraqi army". A third charge against Hashimi was dismissed for lack of evidence. The death sentences are not final and can be appealed within 30 days.

Hashimi was secondly tried in absentia in November 2012 for his involvement in a plot to assassinate a senior Iraqi Interior Ministry official. He was again sentenced in absentia to death. In addition, Hashimi was also sentenced in absentia to death three times in December 2012, making the number of the death sentences five.

=== Reactions ===
In his closing statement, Muayad Obeid al-Ezzi, Hashimi's lawyer, said the court has been under political pressure. The presiding judge warned him that the court would open legal proceedings against the defense team if it continued to heap accusations on the court or the judicial system. Obeid also claimed that "in absentia rulings cannot be considered final or enforced. It should remain with the court until the person sentenced is handed over to authorities or arrested." Hashimi protested the sentence in a press conference in Ankara on 10 September, stating that "reconfirming my and my guards' absolute innocence, I totally reject and will never recognise the unfair, the unjust, the politically motivated verdict". Qatar-based Al Jazeera claimed that "Hashem's (Hashimi) case sparked a crisis in Iraq's government and has fuelled Sunni Muslim and Kurdish resentment against Maliki, who critics say is monopolising power." A wave of attacks erupted the same day, killing more than 100 people.

Nada al-Jabouri, a political ally of Hashimi, criticised the ruling, saying that the trial was not fair because Hashimi was not in Baghdad to defend himself. A lawmaker in Iraqiya, Nada al-Jabouri, criticised the timing of the sentence, which occurred as "Iraq is preparing for a big national reconciliation in the near future in order to achieve stability in this country." He added that the trial was "politically motivated."

The political panorama around this trial included repeated clashes between Al-Maliki's government and Saudi Arabia, Qatar, and Turkey over tactical help provided to Syria's President Assad by Iran, through Iraqi airspace, against the wishes of the U.S. government. Hashimi has taken a position decidedly in support of the Free Syrian Army, backed by Turkey and Saudi Arabia. Al-Maliki and Hashimi support opposite sides on the UN sanctions on Iran, while there are reports of some Iranian oil finding its way to Iraqi ports for export and also about smuggling of Iraqi oil into Afghanistan.

Political offices
Preceded by Ghazi al-Yawar and Adil Abdul-Mahdi	Vice President of Iraq; Served alongside Adil Abdul-Mahdi and Khodair al-Khozaei; 2006–2012	Succeeded by Nouri al-Maliki
