= Muslim Association of Britain =

British Sunni Muslim organisation

- Abbreviation: MAB
- Formation: November 1997
- Founder: Kemal Helbawy
- Type: Non-profit organisation
- Headquarters: London, England
- Location: United Kingdom
- President: Abdullah Abdulsamei
- Affiliations: Federation of Islamic Organizations in Europe; Muslim Council of Britain
- Website: mabonline.net

The Muslim Association of Britain (MAB) is a British Sunni Muslim organisation founded in 1997. MAB has been well known for its participation in the protests opposing the Iraq War. More recently, it has been known for promoting Muslim participation in Britain.

It is a member organisation of the Federation of Islamic Organizations in Europe (FIOE).

The newly elected president in 2026 is Abdullah Abdulsamei, who is a chemistry teacher and instructor at the Fitya Centre in London. Prior to him, Anas Altikriti headed the organisation for numerous years.

In November 2026, Egypt designated the Muslim Association of Britain as a terrorist organization.

== Vision ==
The Muslim Association of Britain states that its vision is: "Muslims At Their Best".

== Activities ==
=== Anti-war activities ===
Along with Stop the War Coalition (StWC) and Campaign for Nuclear Disarmament, it has co-sponsored various demonstrations against the 2003 invasion and occupation of Iraq. MAB first started working with the StWC in 2002 when they agreed to merge a demonstration they had planned to mark the anniversary of the Second Palestinian Intifada with a demonstration StWC had planned against the looming Iraq war at the opening of the Labour Party. The march took place under the dual slogans 'Don't attack Iraq' and 'Freedom for Palestine'. According to Altikriti, MAB "spoke to Stop the War and we said to them 'We will join you; however we will not become part of your coalition, we will be a separate and independent entity but we will work together with you on a national basis as part of the anti-war movement.'"

On 27 February 2016, MAB joined the CND rally against Trident.

=== Political endorsements ===
The MAB supported Labour's Ken Livingstone for Mayor of London, George Galloway for Respect both unsuccessfully in the 2004 London Assembly election, where they also recommended a slate of candidates for each constituency, and successfully in London's Bethnal Green and Bow in the 2005 general election, and the Green Party of England and Wales in South East England. In 2004, its president Anas al-Tikriti stood down to become a candidate for Respect in the Yorkshire and the Humber region for the 2004 European Parliament elections. He was not elected.

=== Other activities ===
In late 2002, the Muslim Association of Britain organised a speaking tour in the UK for Anwar al-Awlaki, including events at the London School of Economics, Imperial College, King's College and the School of Oriental and African Studies. Al-Awlaki was later killed in a drone strike by the United States.

The MAB condemned the 7 July 2005 London bombings and joined the StWC in holding a vigil for the victims at the Peace Garden in Euston, London on Saturday, 9 July 2005 and a further solidarity gathering at Russell Square, close to one of the Underground stations targeted, on Sunday, 17 July 2005.

In 2005, the MAB took control of Finsbury Park Mosque and expelled followers of the extremist cleric Abu Hamza al-Masri whom they accused of "promoting hatred".

The MAB opposed the US extradition request for Babar Ahmad, a UK IT specialist who was accused of operating websites which offered support to the then Taliban government in Afghanistan.

In May 2014, MAB condemned the kidnappings of school girls by Boko Haram.

In early 2015, MAB’s vice president, Mohammed Kozbar, urged the government to acknowledge that British foreign policy is a contributing factor to radicalism and that marginalising and criminalising young British Muslims is actually more likely to push them towards terrorist groups like ISIS.

During February 2016 and 2017, the Muslim Association of Britain joined FOSIS in a nationwide campaign called "Believe and Do Good". The campaign was carried out with over 60 Islamic societies throughout the UK.

== Allegations of ties to the Muslim Brotherhood ==
The group is reported to have had direct ties to the Muslim Brotherhood and Hamas; the armed wing of which has been proscribed as a terrorist group by the UK government since 2001. The separate political wing, which administers Gaza and provides social services was proscribed by the UK in 2021. In the past, MAB openly identified itself as an Islamist movement. In MAB's Inspire newspaper, produced for the 28 September 2002 anti-war demonstration, an article on the MAB's “Historical Roots and Background” links it explicitly to the Islamist tradition of the Muslim Brotherhood. At the UK Stop the War Coalition conference in January 2003, the Alliance for Workers' Liberty moved a motion to dissociate from MAB. A MAB speaker, replying, said that MAB was proud to be associated with the Muslim Brotherhood. Anas Altikriti, replying in The Times on 17 August 2004 to allegations that MAB is linked to the Muslim Brotherhood, described MAB as "an independent British organisation" but admitted "links" with the Brotherhood, which he described as follows: "Links with others extend simply to shared ideas, values and expertise, in which the Brotherhood is indeed rich, with around eight decades of experience." According to Paul Goodman in The Daily Telegraph, MAB's founder Dr Kamal Helbawy admitted in 2005 “to still being a member of the Brotherhood and has been denied entry to America. It has also been alleged that Dr Azzam Tamimi, its leader, issued communiqués on behalf of Hamas during the 1990s. His views on suicide bombing are unambiguous. Asked if he would carry out such an attack in Israel, he said: ‘Sacrificing myself for Palestine is a noble cause. It is the straight way to pleasing God and I would do it if I had the opportunity.’”

In November 2014, the organisation was listed as a terrorist group by the United Arab Emirates. MAB expressed "total and utter condemnation" at this action. It further challenged the UAE government to produce any evidence to support its claim, which it has yet to do.

=== 2015 Government report ===
In 2014, a classified UK Government Review into the Muslim Brotherhood commissioned by then Prime Minister David Cameron concluded that while the Muslim Brotherhood have preferred “non-violent incremental change” this is largely “on the grounds of expediency, often on the basis that political opposition will disappear when the process of Islamisation is complete.” The Review found that the Brotherhood “are prepared to countenance violence – including, from time to time, terrorism - where gradualism is ineffective” and have “deliberately, wittingly and openly incubated and sustained an organisation - Hamas - whose military wing has been proscribed in the UK as a terrorist organisation... Some leading Muslim Brotherhood members and supporters have endorsed attacks on western forces.”

The report concluded that "for some years the Muslim Brotherhood... dominated the Muslim Association of Britain (MAB)... MAB became politically active, notably in connection with Palestine and Iraq, and promoted candidates in national and local elections..." The report acknowledges that MAB have publicly distanced themselves from the Muslim Brotherhood, but that privately the group seems to remain sympathetic to the Brotherhood: "The MAB appears much less active than it was between 2002 and 2006. It has little political profile and no obvious connection with groups which have recently arrived from Egypt or the UAE. In 2014 MAB claimed a membership of just 600 people and maintains eight welfare houses (first established here in the 1960s) and associated mosques. It has nine UK branches. MAB has links to the Cordoba Foundation, a think tank which is associated with the Brotherhood (though claiming to be neither affiliated to the Muslim Brotherhood nor a lobby organisation for it)...." The government report criticises MAB for failing to significantly revise its internal literature to disassociate and disavow Islamist ideology: "In their written submission to the review MAB stated that it supported social integration and encouraged young people to be active and responsible citizens. There is some evidence that MAB have tried to do so in specific areas of the country. But as of July 2014 neither MAB nor other organisations related to the Muslim Brotherhood had clearly and publicly promoted a vision of Muslims living in this country as integrated British citizens; indeed, in the course of the preparation of this review MAB accepted that their teaching material has not been updated to reflect their claimed objectives. Literature in the Muslim Brotherhood movement in this country continues to reflect some of the concerns of the foundational Muslim Brotherhood ideology, notably that western society is inherently hostile to Muslim faith and interests and that Muslims must respond by maintaining their distance and autonomy."

In 2015, the UK government published an extract from a report on the Brotherhood commissioned by the UK Cabinet Office by Dr Lorenzo Vidini, Director of the Program on Extremism at George Washington University. Vidini's report claimed that the Brotherhood conducted "entryist" tactics to influence host societies. The report described MAB as an affiliate of the Brotherhood and described the Brotherhood's entryist tactics as follows:

- "Spread their religious and political views to British Muslim communities"
- "Become official or de facto representatives of British Muslim communities in the eyes of the government and the media"
- "Support domestic and international Islamist causes with local Muslim communities and British policy-makers and public"

Muslim Association of Britain president Omer El-Hamdoon said that the MAB had no links to the Brotherhood. El-Hamdoon claimed that the government's accusations were politically motivated, as his organization had criticised Cameron's foreign policy on Iraq.

=== Michael Gove allegation ===
On 14 March 2024, Michael Gove, Secretary of State for Levelling Up, Housing and Communities, speaking in Parliament, named the organisation as one of several regarded as "a cause for concern", under a newly introduced official UK Government definition of extremism. He reiterated the claim that the group is the British affiliate of the Muslim Brotherhood.

== Bibliography ==
- Perry, Damon Lee (2018), The Global Muslim Brotherhood in Britain: Non-Violent Islamist Extremism and the Battle of Ideas, Routledge, ISBN 9781351347907
  - Perry, Damon Lee (2016), The Global Muslim Brotherhood in Britain: A Social Movement?, School of Social Science & Public Policy, King’s College London
- Vidino, Lorenzo (2010), The New Muslim Brotherhood in the West, Columbia University Press, ISBN 9780231522298
- Vidino, Lorenzo (2021), "Aims and Methods of Europe's Muslim Brotherhood", in Noor Dahri (ed.), The Devils Rebirth: The Terror Triangle of Ikhwan, IRGC and Hezbollah, Vij Books India Pvt Ltd, ISBN 9789390439652
