= Iraqi Islamic Party =

Iraqi Islamic Party (IIP) Hizb al-Islami al-Iraqi
- Leader: Rashid al-Azzawi
- Founded: 26 April 1960
- Ideology: Sunni Islamism; Islamic democracy Pan-Islamism
- Political position: Centre-right
- Religion: Sunni Islam
- National affiliation: Muslim Brotherhood in Iraq
- International affiliation: Muslim Brotherhood
- Seats in the Council of Representatives of Iraq: 0 / 329

Website
- www.iraqiparty.org

The Iraqi Islamic Party is the largest Sunni Islamist political party in Iraq as well as the most prominent member of the Iraqi Accord Front political coalition. It was part of the government of Prime Minister Nouri al-Maliki and was part of the government of Haider al-Abadi from 2014–2018. Osama Tawfiq al-Tikriti succeeded Vice-President Tariq al-Hashimi as the party's secretary-general on 24 May 2009, who was succeeded in July 2011 by Ayad al-Samarrai.

The IIP evolved out of the Muslim Brotherhood movement, and was banned from 1961 during Iraqi nationalist rule, something which continued throughout the reign of the Pan-Arab Ba'ath Party right up to the invasion of Iraq in 2003. Like the Muslim Brotherhood, the IIP's religious rather than ethno-political ideology made the party systematically incompatible under the Iraqi governments between 1961 and 2003.

During the 1970s, the IIP began operating in exile in Great Britain and published a newspaper called Dar al-Salam. Iyad al-Samara'i was elected to serve as secretary-general.

== Party leaders ==
- Shura Council Chairman: Dr. Mohsen Abdel Hamid
- Secretary-General: Rashid al-Azzawi
- Deputy Secretary-General:
- Assistant Secretary-General: Dr. Ziad al-Ani

=== Political Bureau ===
- Dr. Alaa Maki
- Dr. Omar Abdul Sattar Karbouli
- Professor Abd al-Karim al-Samarrai
- Professor Naseer al-Ani

== Post-invasion ==
Mohsen Abdel Hamid served on the Iraqi Governing Council that worked alongside the Coalition Provisional Authority after the invasion of Iraq. It joined the Iraqi Interim Government where it had one minister, Hajim al-Hassani.

On 9 November 2004, the IIP withdrew from the government in protest over Operation Phantom Fury, an offensive at Fallujah led by U.S. forces. Hassani chose to stay in the government and quit the party, later joining The Iraqis list.

== Government participation ==
The party initially supported the general elections of 30 January 2005 but pulled out of the national election one month before the vote saying violence made a fair election impossible. The party did participate in some elections for governorate level posts on the same day (see for instance 2005 Ninawa governorate election and 2005 Al-Anbar governorate council election).

The IIP led a large-scale public campaign urging Iraqis (especially the Sunnis) to vote against the constitutional referendum in 2005. Two days before the referendum took place, the IIP announced its support for a "yes" vote, following a compromise with the members of the Iraqi Transitional Government whereby the newly elected Iraqi National Assembly would consider amendments to the constitution in 2006.

In the December 2005 election, the IIP ran as part of the Iraqi Accord Front coalition, which won 44 seats, the most for any Sunni Arab coalition. The leader of Al-Qaida in Iraq, Abu Mu'sab al-Zarqawi, condemned the IIP for their participation in the general election.

The party's platform for the elections included demanding a timetable for the withdrawal of the Multinational force in Iraq, opposition to federalism in Iraq, opposition to De-Ba'athification and promotion of Islamic values.

Following the elections in 2006, the IAF joined the United Iraqi Alliance-led government of Nouri al-Maliki. In 2012, the party formed a coalition several Sunni Islamists parties called Muttahidoon.

== Relationship with US ==
The party has often criticized the US military presence in Iraq. In October 2008, following a US-backed raid that resulted in the death of a man the IIP said was a senior party official, the party said in a statement that it was suspending all contact with US civilian and military officials., A US military drone crashed into the party's offices in Mosul in 2009. A spokesman for US forces in Iraq said the location of the crash was a pure coincidence.

== See also ==
- List of Islamic political parties
