= Smouha =

Smouha سموحة
- District in Alexandria
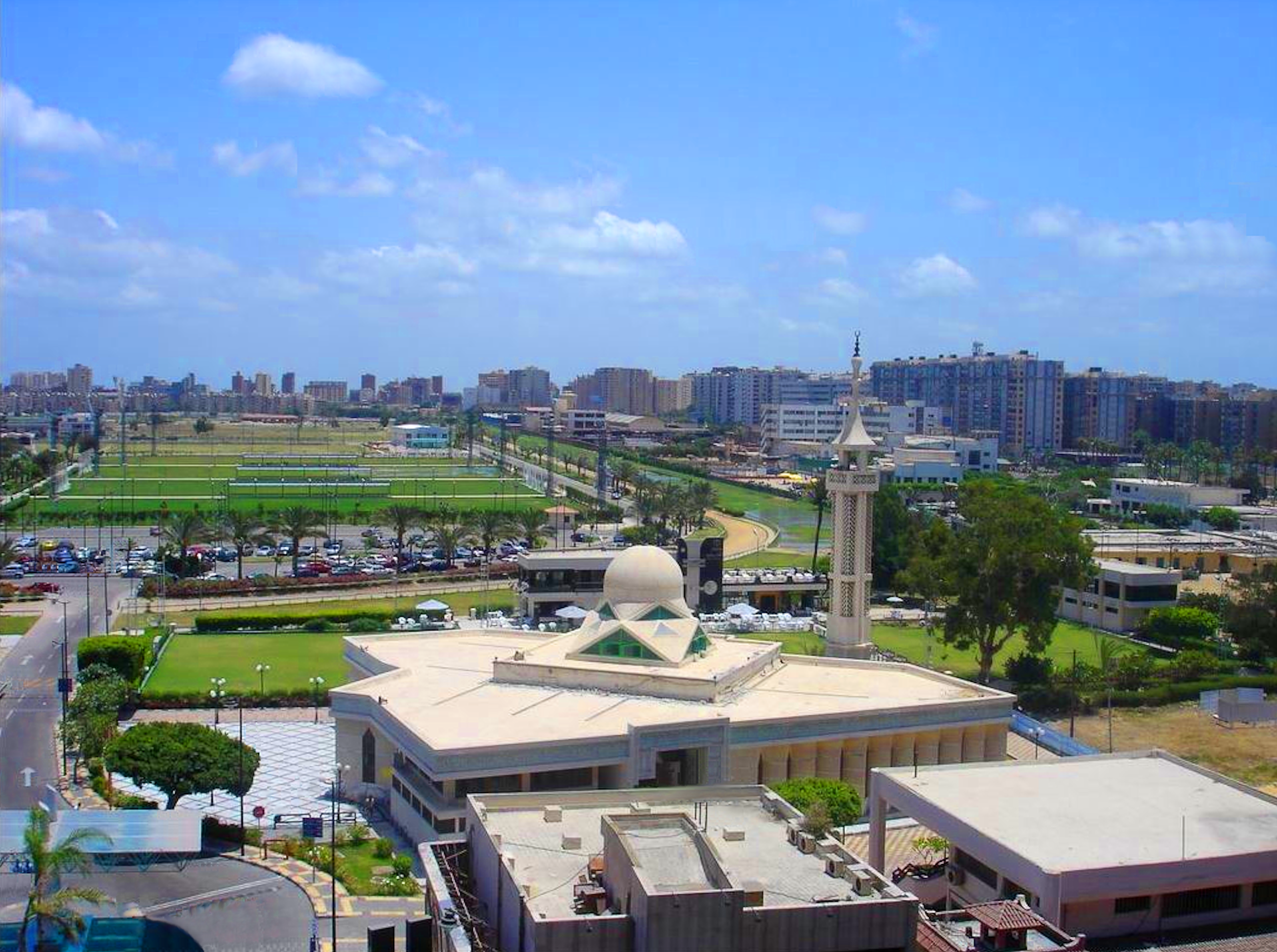
- Skyline of Smouha from Smouha Sporting Club

- Location in Egypt
- Coordinates: 31.218307°N 29.943652°E
- Country: Egypt
- Governorate: Alexandria
- City: Alexandria
- Time zone: UTC+2 (EET)
  - Summer (DST): UTC+3 (EEST)
- Postal code: 21648
- Area code: +20

Smouha (Arabic: سموحة) is an upper-class district in the centre of Alexandria, Egypt. It is home to the Security Directorate of Alexandria and the Smouha Sporting Club, Smouha's central roundabout (Victor Emmanuel Square) connects between other areas in Alexandria and highways like Cairo–Alexandria desert road and Tanta-Alexandria Agriculture road.

== See also ==
- Neighborhoods in Alexandria
