= Al-Hiwar =

Arabic-language TV channel

Al Hiwar / قناة الحوار
- Country: United Kingdom
- Broadcast area: Europe, Africa, Middle East, Asia
- Headquarters: London, United Kingdom

Programming
- Language: Arabic
- Picture format: 576i (16:9 SDTV); 1080i (HDTV)

History
- Launched: January 1, 2006

Links
- Website: alhiwar.tv (Arabic)

AlHiwar (Arabic: الحوار) is an Arabic language MB-tied propaganda satellite TV channel broadcasting from London.

== History ==
Al-Hiwar was founded in 2006; its founding managing editor is Azzam Al-Tamimi, a longtime Muslim Brotherhood affiliate and supporter of Palestinian group Hamas.

== Programs ==
- Revisions (Arabic: مراجعات)

Is a series of dialogues in which Dr. Azzam Al-Tamimi hosts a group of Arab figures from different political backgrounds, where they shed light on their contributions to major events witnessed by the Arab and Islamic world and share their experience.

- Highlights of Events (Arabic: أضواء على الأحداث)

Is a daily TV program that analyses the most important Arab and international events. It hosts experts and analysts from different regions of the world who go deeper into the news and developments. It mainly focuses on issues related to the Arab citizen, including economic, political and social issues.

- The Free Opinion (Arabic: الرأي الحر)

Is a daily 2-hour interactive program. It provides the viewer with a platform to express his opinion on current issues that concern the daily life of the Arab citizen.

- London Dialogue (Arabic: حوار لندن)

Is an interactive weekly program which has no presenter, but different attendees, who discuss the most important issues that have passed over the week, in an open and interactive manner that makes the discussion move swiftly between the guests without prior preparation.

Al Hiwar’s registered address is covertly in the Westgate House which has been accused of serving as a hub for Muslim Brotherhood and Hamas operations in Western Europe.

== Censorship attempts ==
The TV station was the target of several censorship attempts; in May 2009, it was taken off Hotbird after repeated and deliberate jamming of its signals. This happened while the channel was airing interviews with exiled Libyan opposition leaders.

Egypt

Al-Hiwar was unexpectedly taken off Egyptian-owned satellite operator Nilesat in April 2008. This move came just weeks after the signing of the so-called "Principles for Regulating Satellite TV in the Arab World" which was adopted unanimously by the Arab League during a meeting in Cairo on February 12, 2008. However, the Egyptian authorities and Nilesat denied that the new charter on Arab media had anything to do with this.

The United Arab Emirates

In June 2008, Emirati authorities seized tapes and recordings of Al-Hiwar journalists in Dubai Airport, who were leaving for London after they had filmed an episode of "Khaleeji Dimensions" that deals with the national identity in the United Arab Emirates. The material seized was later sent to Al-Hiwar headquarters in London and the original airing schedule for the episode was postponed.

== Broadcasting ==
High-definition (HD) broadcasting was started in January 2017 via satellite using Hot Bird 13B and in October 2018 (HD) started on Nilesat.
