= Gezira Sporting Club =

Multi-sport facility in Egypt

- Company type: Club
- Genre: Sports
- Founded: 1882
- Founder: Anglo-Egyptians
- Headquarters: Zamalek, Cairo, Egypt
- Key people: Chairman Ibrahim Zaher Vice Chairman Ali Shaaban Treasurer Amr Abol-Enein
- Website: www.gsc.eg

The Gezira Sporting Club (Arabic: نادى الجزيرة الرياضى, transliteration:nādī al-ǧazyrah al-reyādī) is the largest multi-sport facility in Egypt. It was founded in 1882 and was originally called Khedivial Sporting Club. It is located on the island of Zamalek in Cairo.

== History ==
The 150-acre (0.61 km^{2}) grounds of the Gezira Sporting Club were initially carved out of the Khedivial Botanical Gardens, and as a result acacias and gardens decorate the area. After the land had been formally leased to the British military command in 1882, club rules were licensed and the land was divided into several recreational playing grounds. At first, the club was for the exclusive use of the British Army. Membership was restricted to applicants elected by the committee, on the recommendation of two members, although British army officers were automatically enrolled. There were about 750 members. Guests could visit the club whenever accompanied by those members by purchasing Day Passes for E£50.

In 1906, the club members asked the Egyptian government for ownership, but their request was refused. Instead, they were granted a 60-year lease.

The exclusive character of the club continued until after World War II. In January 1952, the club was nationalized and became a public club. By this point, most members of the Gezira Sporting Club were Egyptians, but the club's members were from society's elite. As a result of nationalization, the ethos and structure of the club were to be altered during the Nasser regime. Half of its eighteen-hole golf course were given over to a youth club built by the Egyptian government on the club premises (making it a nine-hole course). Much of what was deemed as a traditionally aristocratic asset was nationalized.

During Anwar Al Sadat's presidency, a new elevated highway (the 6th October Bridge) was built over the remaining nine-hole golf course and six-furlong racecourse causing the size of the club to further erode.

Despite suffering vandalism, the Gezira Sporting Club still offers most of the sports and games practiced by its founders: golf, tennis, squash, croquet, horse riding and cricket.

As of 2012, membership was estimated to consist of 43,000 families.

== Golf ==
About the course
18 holes (played on 9 fairways), Par 70, 5,860 yards (5,360 m), rating 68, three tees.
Who can play
Annual members

The 125-year-old par 70 golf course was the first in Egypt.

== Tennis ==
Since 1907, Gezira Sporting Club has been the official home of Egypt's lawn tennis with open tournaments and championships regularly held on its clay courts. From 1925, international celebrities took part in these widely attended events as it staged the International Championships of Egypt.

Despite the launch of the Egyptian Lawn Tennis Association Championship in 1934, Gezira Sporting Club continued to offer its two cups:

- The Doherty: awarded for the singles.
- The Slazenger: awarded for the doubles.

== Swimming ==
The Gezira swimming team was founded in the early 20th century.

== Current sports ==
There are currently around forty sports played in Gezira Sporting Club. Some are:

- Athletics
- Basketball
- Boxing
- Cycling
- Football
- Golf
- Gymnastics
- Handball
- Hockey
- Horse riding
- Judo
- Kung-fu
- Karate
- Polo
- Speedball
- Squash
- Swimming and diving
- Table tennis
- Taekwondo
- Tennis
- Volleyball
- Water polo
- Water Ballet or synchronized swimming
- Cricket
- Aerobics
- Ballet
- Fencing

== Other branch ==
Like other large clubs in Egypt, the Gezira Sporting Club has built another branch. The location is in the 6th of October City. The club had signed a contract for 50 acres (20 ha) of land and construction has started. The club in 6 October has been operational since February 2020 with more developments to follow/
