= 2024 BAL Kalahari Conference =

2024 Kalahari Conference
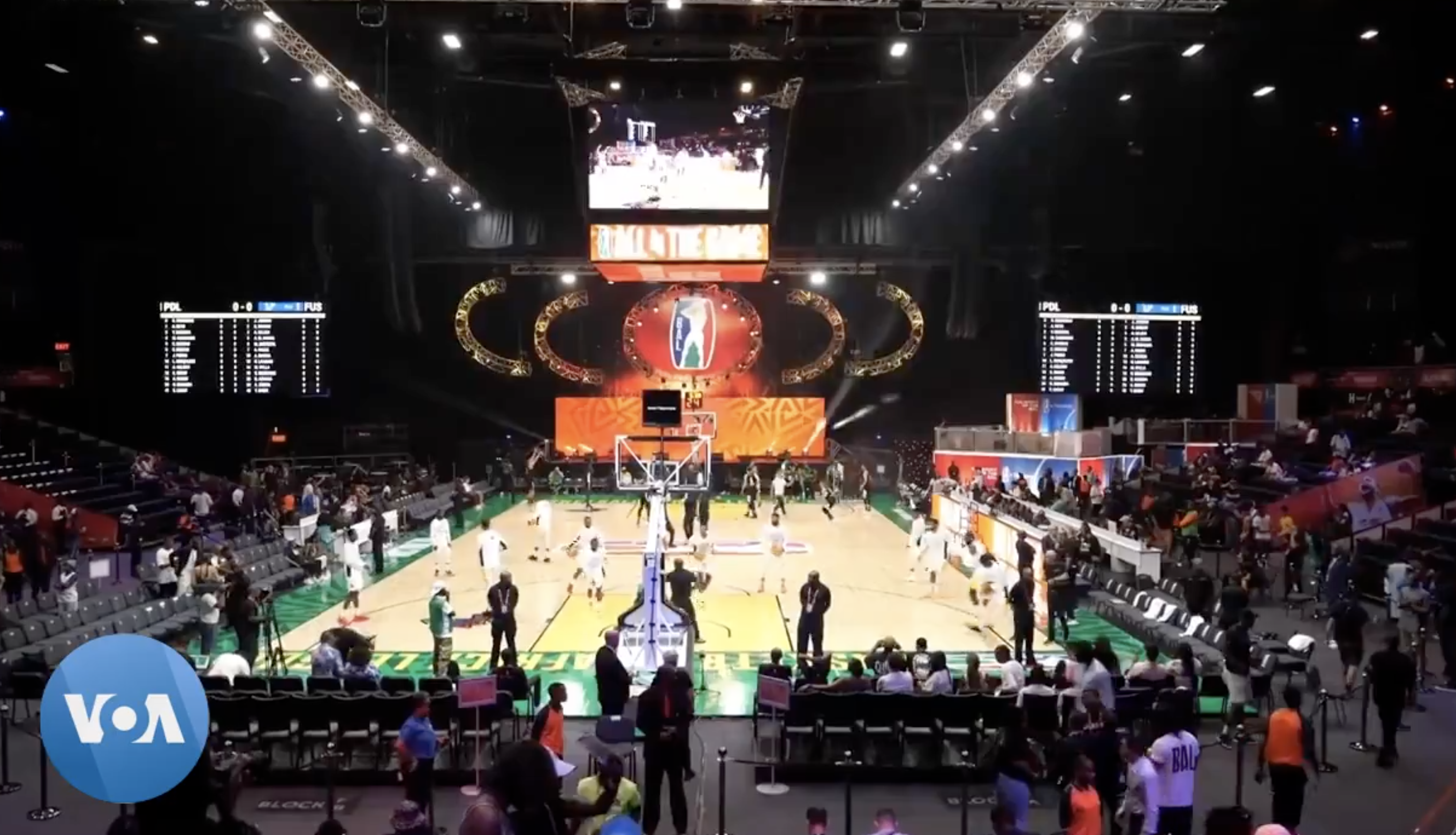
- Interior of the SunBet Arena during the games

Tournament details
- Country: South Africa
- City: Pretoria
- Venue(s): SunBet Arena
- Dates: 9 – 17 March 2024
- Teams: 4

Final positions
- Champions: (Morocco) FUS Rabat (1st title)

Tournament statistics
- Matches played: 7
- Attendance: 26,214 (3,745 per match)
- Top scorer: Samkelo Cele, Cape Town Tigers (20.5)

The 2024 BAL Kalahari Conference is the inaugural season of the Kalahari Conference, one of the three conferences of the Basketball Africa League (BAL). The composition of the conference and the schedule were announced on 15 February 2024. The conference games began on 9 March and will end on 17 March 2024.

FUS Rabat were the inaugural Kalahari Conference champions, after finishing ahead of Petro de Luanda and the Cape Town Tigers. Dynamo had withdrawn after the first game day.

== Withdrawal of Dynamo BBC ==
In the opening day game between Burundi's Dynamo and South Africa's Cape Town Tigers, the Burundian side taped off the logo of league sponsor Visit Rwanda. Political tensions between the two border nations Burundi and Rwanda had been rising, as Burundi has accused Rwanda of supporting the RED-Tabara rebel militia in the country. Dynamo forfeited their second game against FUS Rabat on 10 March, with the BAL citing "refusing to comply with the league’s rules governing jersey and uniform requirements" as the reason why. Following Dynamo's second forfeit on 12 March, the team was automatically withdrawn from the group as per FIBA rules. Dynamo players Bryton Hobbs and Makhtar Gueye stated that the Burundian government had prohibited the team to wear the logo and ordered the club to forfeit its games if necessary.

Following the withdrawal of Dynamo, the BAL scheduled three games involving the NBA Academy Africa and local South African teams to fill up the holes in the schedule.

== Standings ==
Pos	Team	Pld	W	L	GF	GA	GD	PCT	Qualification
1	(Morocco) FUS Rabat	4	3	1	363	295	+68	.750	Advance to playoffs
2	(Angola) Petro de Luanda	4	2	2	360	340	+20	.500	Advance to playoffs
3	(South Africa) Cape Town Tigers (H)	4	1	3	305	346	−41	.250	Advance to playoffs
4	(Burundi) Dynamo (D)	0	0	0	0	0	0	—	Withdrew

Source: BAL
Rules for classification: Tiebreakers
(D) Disqualified; (H) Hosts

== Games ==
All times are in Central Africa Time.

=== Gameday 1 ===
9 March 2024
12:00 PM (4:00 PM PST)

Boxscore

Petro de Luanda (Angola)	73–82	(Morocco) FUS Rabat
Scoring by quarter: 17–23, 14–18, 24–25, 18–16
Pts: Morais 19; Rebs: Gakou 7 Asts: Dundão 4		Pts: Jordan 20; Rebs: Diarra 10; Asts: Four players 3

SunBet Arena, Pretoria
Attendance: 2,727
Referees: Gerda Gatling, Arnold Moseya, Didier Gaga

9 March 2024
3:00 PM (7:00 PM PST)

Boxscore

Cape Town Tigers (South Africa)	73–86	(Burundi) Dynamo
Scoring by quarter: 15–21, 14–23, 24–22, 20–20
Pts: Cele 26; Rebs: Sibanyoni, Preston 7 Asts: Sibanyoni 5		Pts: Otobo 21; Rebs: Otobo 13; Asts: Hobbs 8

SunBet Arena, Pretoria
Attendance: 5,749
Referees: Kevin Fahy, Wael Ibrahim Mostafa, Monicca Nassuuna

=== Gameday 2 ===
10 March 2024
12:00 PM (4:00 PM PST)

Dynamo (Burundi)	0–20	(Morocco) FUS Rabat

SunBet Arena, Pretoria

10 March 2024
3:00 PM (7:00 PM PST)

Boxscore

Petro de Luanda (Angola)	100–88	(South Africa) Cape Town Tigers
Scoring by quarter: 31–14, 16–28, 30–19, 23–27
Pts: Buiamba, Morais 17; Rebs: Morais, Moreira 8 Asts: Dundão 5		Pts: Manyang 20; Rebs: Sibanyoni 9 Asts: Cele 4

SunBet Arena, Pretoria
Attendance: 3,576
Referees: Omar Bermudez, Haytham Ihaqaf, Mahamadou Diallo

=== Gameday 3 ===
12 March 2024
12:00 PM (4:00 PM PST)

Dynamo (Burundi)	0–20	(Angola) Petro de Luanda

SunBet Arena, Pretoria

12 March 2024
3:00 PM (7:00 PM PST)

Boxscore

Cape Town Tigers (South Africa)	58–84	(Morocco) FUS Rabat
Scoring by quarter: 18–24, 16–20, 10–27, 14–13
Pts: Cele 22; Rebs: Sibanyoni 8 Asts: Diarra 3		Pts: Diarra 21; Rebs: Azouga, Najah 7 Asts: Jordan 7

SunBet Arena, Pretoria
Attendance: 1,050
Referees: Jason Alabanza, Erick Otieno, Dorothy Okatch

=== Gameday 4 ===
14 March 2024
3:00 PM (7:00 PM PST)

Boxscore

FUS Rabat (Morocco)	86–89	(Angola) Petro de Luanda
Scoring by quarter: 25–25, 9–21, 23–29, 29–24
Pts: Jordan 18; Rebs: Diarra 7 Asts: Three players 4		Pts: Dundão 25; Rebs: Gakou 10; Asts: Three players 4

SunBet Arena, Pretoria
Attendance: 1,551
Referees: Kevin Fahy, Arnold Moseya, Monicca Nassuuna

=== Gameday 5 ===
16 March 2024
3:00 PM (7:00 PM PST)

Boxscore

Cape Town Tigers (South Africa)	84–78	(Angola) Petro de Luanda
Scoring by quarter: 23–21, 24–20, 17–19, 20–18
Pts: Preston 20; Rebs: Preston 11; Asts: Diarra 9		Pts: Moreira 20; Rebs: Moreira 10; Asts: Morais 7

SunBet Arena, Pretoria
Attendance: 5,734
Referees: Jason Alabanza, Wael Ibrahim Mostafa, Dorothy Okatch

=== Gameday 6 ===
17 March 2024
3:00 PM (7:00 PM PST)

Boxscore

FUS Rabat (Morocco)	84–78	(South Africa) Cape Town Tigers
Scoring by quarter: 15–33, 22–21, 22–25, 25–16
Pts: Jordan 19; Rebs: Diarra 11; Asts: Nouhi 5		Pts: Cele 24; Rebs: Preston, Sibanyoni 7 Asts: Preston 5

SunBet Arena, Pretoria
Attendance: 5,827
Referees: Gerda Gatling, Erick Otieno, Didier Gaga

== Individual statistics ==
Category	Player	Team(s)	Statistic
Points per game	Samkelo Cele	Cape Town Tigers	20.5
Rebounds per game	Aliou Diarra	FUS Rabat	8.5
Assists per game	John Jordan	FUS Rabat	4.5
Steals per game	Samkelo Cele	Cape Town Tigers	2.3
Blocks per game	Aliou Diarra	FUS Rabat	2.3
