= List of Basketball Africa League arenas =

The following list includes all current and former arenas used by the Basketball Africa League (BAL). Other information included in this list are arena locations, seating capacities, years opened, and in use.

Under the league's current format, the league announces the host arenas prior to the season. The BAL initially announced seven venues for the inaugural 2021 season, however, all games were played in one venue due to the COVID-19 pandemic. In the following season, the BAL expanded to two more arenas. The BAL plans to play different stages of the regular season conferences in different arenas.

== By season ==
- FS = Full Season
- SC = Sahara Conference
- NC = Nile Conference
- F = Playoffs and Finals

List of BAL events by arena in history
Arena	Season				
Arena	21	22	23	24	25
BK Arena	FS	F	F	F	KC
Dakar Arena		SC	SC	SC	SC
Hassan Moustafa Sports Hall		NC	NC	NC	
Salle Moulay Abdellah					NC
SunBet Arena				KC	F

== Arenas ==
Name	City	Country	Capacity	Opened	First BAL game	Games played	Finals hosted
BK Arena	Kigali	Rwanda	10,000	2019	16 May 2021	58	4
Dakar Arena	Dakar (Diamniadio)	Senegal	15,000	2018	5 March 2022	41	–
Hassan Moustafa Sports Hall	Cairo (6th of October)	Egypt	5,200	2020	9 April 2022	27	–
Salle Moulay Abdellah	Rabat	Morocco	10,000	2000	5 April 2024	12	–
SunBet Arena	Pretoria	South Africa	8,500	2017	9 March 2024	24	1
