= 2023–24 FUS Rabat basketball season =

FUS Rabat
- Chairman: Said El Yamani
- Head coach: Said El Bouzidi
- BAL: 1st in Kalahari Conference (1st seed overall)
- Playoffs: Quarterfinals (eliminated by Cape Town Tigers)
- Division Excellence: In progress
- Throne Cup: To be played
- Biggest win: 56 points Raja CA 33–89 FUS Rabat (7 October 2023)
- Biggest defeat: 10 points AS Salé 88–78 FUS Rabat (18 December 2023)

FUS Rabat plays the 2023–24 season in the Division Excellence and the Basketball Africa League (BAL), as well as in the Throne Cup competition.

They made their debut in the Road to BAL, having qualified as national champions. On 4 November, a place in the main tournament was guaranteed following a win over FAP in the semi-finals. FUS Rabat won the Kalahari Conference and clinched the number one seed for the playoffs, however, they were eliminated by the eight-seeded Cape Town Tigers who won the quarterfinal after overtime.

== Roster ==
=== Current roster ===
Note: Flags indicate national team eligibility at FIBA-sanctioned events. Players may hold other non-FIBA nationalities not displayed.

FUS Rabat roster
Players
Coaches

Pos.	No.	Nat.	Name	Ht.	Age
PG	1	(United States)	Jordan, John	1.78 m (5 ft 10 in)	34 – 10 July 1992
PG	2	(United States)	Brown, Ken	1.82 m (6 ft 0 in)	37 – 24 October 1989
F	4	(Morocco)	Najah, Abderrahim	1.98 m (6 ft 6 in)	41 – 20 November 1984
PG	5	(Morocco)	El Haoua, Abdelkarim	1.80 m (5 ft 11 in)	29 – 28 August 1997
F	6	(Morocco)	Zeghloul, Mohamed Anas	2.00 m (6 ft 7 in)	22 – 8 April 2004
SG	7	(Morocco)	Nouhi, Ayoub	1.98 m (6 ft 6 in)	27 – 1 July 1999
F/C	10	(Mali)	Diarra, Aliou	2.00 m (6 ft 7 in)	24 – 31 December 2001
F/C	13	(Morocco)	Laanani, Omar	2.08 m (6 ft 10 in)	39 – 26 March 1987
C	14	(Senegal)	Sylla, Mohamed (E)	2.09 m (6 ft 10 in)	21 – 31 January 2005
G	15	(Morocco)	Benmhine, Soufiane	1.89 m (6 ft 2 in)	34 – 4 August 1992
F/C	23	(Morocco)	Azouga, Badr Eddine	2.04 m (6 ft 8 in)	31 – 7 February 1995
PF	24	(Morocco)	Zouita, Abdelhakim	2.03 m (6 ft 8 in)	39 – 8 December 1986
G	45	(Morocco)	Baeri, Yacine	2.00 m (6 ft 7 in)	37 – 4 October 1989

Head coach

- (Morocco) Said El Bouzidi

Assistant coach(es)

- (Morocco) Mohamed Oufrid
- (Morocco) Ahmed Salam

Legend

- (C) Team captain
- Injured

- Roster
Updated: 17 March 2024

== Transactions ==
=== In ===
No.	Pos.	Nat.	Name	Age	Moving from		Type	Ends	Date	Source
55	G/F	(Morocco)	Baeri Yacine	34	Free agent		Free agent	2024	October 25, 2023	
11	C	(Nigeria)	Prince Orizu	28	Tormes	(Spain)	Free agent	2024	October 25, 2023	
15	C	(Mali)	Aliou Diarra	21	Stade Malien	(Mali)	Free agent	2024	October 31, 2023	
1	PG	(United States)	John Jordan	30	Zdravlje	(Serbia)	Free agent	2024	January 20, 2024	
2	PG	(United States)	Ken Brown	33	Al-Ittihad Aleppo	(Syria)	Free agent	2024	January 20, 2024	

== Competitions ==
=== Overview ===
Competition	First match	Last match	Starting round	Final position	Record							
Competition	First match	Last match	Starting round	Final position	Pld	W	D	L	PF	PA	PD	Win %
BAL	9 March 2024	26 May 2024	Kalahari Conference	Quarterfinals	6	4	0	2	540	464	+76	66.67
Road to BAL	31 October 2023	5 November 2023	Elite 16	Final	5	3	0	2	408	390	+18	60.00
Division Excellence	4 October 2023								—			
Throne Cup									—			
Total					11	7	0	4	948	854	+94	63.64

Source: Goalzz, Afrobasket.com

=== Division Excellence ===
==== Regular season ====
Gameday	Date	Opponents	H / A	Result	Record
1	4 October	ASA	H	W 96–58	1–0
2	7 October	Raja Casablanca	A	W 33–89	2–0
3	15 October	MTB Majd Tanger	H	W 83–55	3–0
4	21 October	Wydad AC	H	W 72–62	4–0
5	11 November	KACM	A	W 68–74	5–0
6	23 November	IRT Tanger	H	W 70–67	6–0
7	4 December	MAS Fez	A	W 51–66	7–0
8	7 December	ASC	A	W 67–77	8–0
9	10 December	Larache	H	W 83–63	9–0
10	18 December	AS Salé	A	L 88–78	9–1
11	6 January	AS FAR	H	W 75–59	10–1
12	20 January	Raja Casablanca	H	W 80–67	11–1
13	25 January	MTB Majd Tanger	A	W 61–73	12–1
14	5 February	Wydad AC	A	W 53–74	13–1
15	8 February	ASC	H	W 83–60	14–1
16	2 March	AS FAR	A	W 70–78	15–1
17	8 April	Larache	A	L 90–89	15–2
18	17 April	AS Salé	H	W 98–86	16–2

==== Second stage ====
Gameday	Date	Opponents	H / A	Result	Record
1	4 May	MTB Majd Tanger	A	W 69–90	1–0
2	8 May	ASCHBB	A	W 76–91	2–0
3	12 May	MTB Majd Tanger	H	W 92–72	3–0
4	15 May	ASCHBB	H	W 98–52	4–0
5	3 June	IRT Tanger	A	W 78–80	5–0
6	6 June	IRT Tanger	H	W 88–76	6–0

==== Playoffs ====
Gameday	Date	Opponents	H / A	Result	Record
Semifinals
Game 1	15 June	MAS Fes	A	W 63–78	1–0

=== Road to BAL ===
==== Elite 16 ====
31 October 2023 1	ABC Fighters (Ivory Coast)	76–84	(Morocco) FUS Rabat	POPSI, Yaoundé
14:00	Scoring by quarter: 8-19, 25-22, 17-20, 26-23
	Pts: Akano 19; Rebs: Edosomwan 10; Asts: Kra 4	Report	Pts: Jordan 18; Rebs: Diarra 5 Asts: Jordan, Zouita 4	Referees: Walelign Gebeto (ETH), Didier Gaga (RWA), Ahmed Khedr (EGY)

1 November 2023 2	FUS Rabat (Morocco)	90–89(OT)	(Central African Republic) Bangui Sporting Club	POPSI, Yaoundé
17:00	Scoring by quarter: 17-23, 21-19, 22-26, 22-14, Overtime: 8-7
	Pts: Jordan 28; Rebs: Diarra 9 Asts: Jordan 6	Report	Pts: Ganapamo 20; Rebs: Djimrabaye 11; Asts: Johnson 8	Referees: Walelign Gebeto (ETH), Emmanuel Kpawogbo (BEN), Papa Felix Seye (SEN)

2 November 2023 3	FUS Rabat (Morocco)	66–73	(Guinea) SLAC	POPSI, Yaoundé
14:00	Scoring by quarter: 19-15, 14-17, 16-22, 17-19
	Pts: Baeri, Jordan 10; Rebs: Three players 5 Asts: Baeri, Nouhi 3		Pts: Zouzoua 24; Rebs: Nguirane 14; Asts: Gilbert 5	Referees: Didier Gaga (RWA), Ahmed Khedr (EGY), Didier Shema Nshuti (RWA)

==== Final stage ====
===== Semi-finals =====
4 November 2023 Semi-final	FUS Rabat (Morocco)	78–60	(Cameroon) FAP	POPSI, Yaoundé
20:00	Scoring by quarter: 21-21, 22-14, 21-16, 14-9
	Pts: Diarra 18; Rebs: Diarra 21; Asts: El Haoua 6	Report	Pts: Tametong 18; Rebs: Njiki 8 Asts: Keumoe 3	Referees: Hassane Kamate (CIV), Sara Elsharnouby (EGY), Claudio Eiuba (ANG)

===== Final =====
5 November 2023 Final	Bangui Sporting Club (Central African Republic)	92–90	(Morocco) FUS Rabat	POPSI, Yaoundé
17:00	Scoring by quarter: 21-20, 27-23, 21-24, 24-23
	Pts: Kamayengue 17; Rebs: Djimrabaye 10; Asts: Johnson 7	Report	Pts: Jordan 17; Rebs: Azouga 8 Asts: Jordan 8	Referees: Hassane Kamate (CIV), Claudio Eiuba (ANG), Emmanuel Kpawogbo (BEN)

=== BAL ===
FUS Rabat played in the Kalahari Conference in South Africa and won the inaugural conference title.

==== Kalahari Conference ====
Pos	Team	Pld	W	L	PF	PA	PD	PCT	Qualification
1	(Morocco) FUS Rabat	4	3	1	363	295	+68	.750	Advance to playoffs
2	(Angola) Petro de Luanda	4	2	2	360	340	+20	.500	Advance to playoffs
3	(South Africa) Cape Town Tigers (H)	4	1	3	305	346	−41	.250	Advance to playoffs
4	(Burundi) Dynamo (D)	0	0	0	0	0	0	—	Withdrew

Source: BAL
Rules for classification: Tiebreakers
(D) Disqualified; (H) Hosts

9 March 2024	Petro de Luanda (Angola)	73–82	(Morocco) FUS Rabat	SunBet Arena, Pretoria
12:00 PM (4:00 PM PST)	Scoring by quarter: 17–23, 14–18, 24–25, 18–16
	Pts: Morais 19; Rebs: Gakou 7 Asts: Dundão 4	Boxscore	Pts: Jordan 20; Rebs: Diarra 10; Asts: Four players 3	Attendance: 2,727; Referees: Gerda Gatling, Arnold Moseya, Didier Gaga

12 March 2024	Cape Town Tigers (South Africa)	58–84	(Morocco) FUS Rabat	SunBet Arena, Pretoria
3:00 PM (7:00 PM PST)	Scoring by quarter: 18–24, 16–20, 10–27, 14–13
	Pts: Cele 22; Rebs: Sibanyoni 8 Asts: Diarra 3	Boxscore	Pts: Diarra 21; Rebs: Azouga, Najah 7 Asts: Jordan 7	Attendance: 1,050; Referees: Jason Alabanza, Erick Otieno, Dorothy Okatch

14 March 2024	FUS Rabat (Morocco)	86–89	(Angola) Petro de Luanda	SunBet Arena, Pretoria
3:00 PM (7:00 PM PST)	Scoring by quarter: 25–25, 9–21, 23–29, 29–24
	Pts: Jordan 18; Rebs: Diarra 7 Asts: Three players 4	Boxscore	Pts: Dundão 25; Rebs: Gakou 10; Asts: Three players 4	Attendance: 1,551; Referees: Kevin Fahy, Arnold Moseya, Monicca Nassuuna

17 March 2024	FUS Rabat (Morocco)	84–78	(South Africa) Cape Town Tigers	SunBet Arena, Pretoria
3:00 PM (7:00 PM PST)	Scoring by quarter: 15–33, 22–21, 22–25, 25–16
	Pts: Jordan 19; Rebs: Diarra 11; Asts: Nouhi 5	Boxscore	Pts: Cele 24; Rebs: Preston, Sibanyoni 7 Asts: Preston 5	Attendance: 5,827; Referees: Gerda Gatling, Erick Otieno, Didier Gaga

==== Playoffs ====
===== Seeding game (1st–2nd seed) =====
24 May 2024	Al Ahly (Egypt)	78–89	(Morocco) FUS Rabat	BK Arena, Kigali, Rwanda
8:00 PM	Scoring by quarter: 19–22, 30–19, 15–17, 14–31
	Pts: Lyons 21; Rebs: Mitchell 9 Asts: Gendy 5	Livestats	Pts: Diarra 21; Rebs: Diarra 10; Asts: Brown 5	Attendance: 7,154; Referees: Julian Scott, Yann Vezo Davidson, Jean Sauveur Ruhamiriza

===== Quarterfinals =====
26 May 2024	FUS Rabat (Morocco)	88–91OT	(South Africa) Cape Town Tigers	BK Arena, Kigali, Rwanda
5:30 PM	Scoring by quarter: 17–15, 24–29, 18–19, 24–20, Overtime: 5–8
	Pts: Diarra 18; Rebs: Diarra 16; Asts: Jordan 7	Livestats	Pts: Cele 30; Rebs: Sibanyoni 25; Asts: Diarra 8	Attendance: 6,279; Referees: Pat O'Connell, Aboolo Amr, Monicca Nassuunav

== Player statistics ==
Legend
GP	Games played	GS	Games started	MPG	Minutes per game
FG%	Field-goal percentage	3P%	3-point field-goal percentage	FT%	Free-throw percentage
RPG	Rebounds per game	APG	Assists per game	SPG	Steals per game
BPG	Blocks per game	PPG	Points per game

FUS Rabat statistics
Player	GP	MPG	FG%	3FG%	FT%	RPG	APG	SPG	BPG	PPG
Abdelhakim Zouita	6	21.8	.438	.000	.600	3.8	3.7	0.2	0.3	8.5
Mohamed Anas Zeghloul	2	1.0	.000	.000	.000	0.0	0.0	0.0	0.0	0.0
Mohamed Sylla	6	13.0	.484	.000	.667	4.8	0.3	0.2	1.2	6.0
Ayoub Nouhi	6	22.7	.396	.133	.533	1.2	2.5	0.3	0.5	8.7
Abderrahim Najah	6	10.5	.481	.000	.200	4.5	0.8	0.3	0.3	4.5
John Jordan	6	30.7	.391	.344	.852	4.5	4.8	2.0	0.3	14.7
Abdelkarim El Haoua	6	8.8	.500	.000	.750	0.5	0.5	0.2	0.2	0.8
Aliou Diarra	6	25.9	.667	.000	.633	10.0	1.0	1.0	2.2	16.5
Ken Brown	6	30.5	.460	.405	.583	2.5	2.2	1.5	0.2	11.3
Soufiane Benhmine	6	20.5	.400	.278	.800	2.8	2.8	1.2	0.0	6.8
Yacine Baeri	6	8.1	.350	.385	.750	0.3	0.5	0.3	0.0	3.7
Badr Azouga	6	11.1	.421	.250	.600	3.2	1.2	0.3	0.3	4.0
