= 2023–24 Cape Town Tigers season =

Cape Town Tigers
2023–24 season
- Head coach: Florsheim Ngwenya
- Basketball National League: Withdrew
- BAL: Fourth Place

The 2023–24 season of the Cape Town Tigers was the 4th season in the team's history.

Following their championship in the 2023 Basketball National League (BNL), the Tigers played in the Road to BAL. Under Florsheim Ngwenya as head coach, the Tigers went undefeated (5–0) in the qualifiers, and thus they will play in the Basketball Africa League (BAL) for a third straight season.

In the 2024 BAL season, the Tigers struggled in the Kalahari Conference, which was hosted in South Africa. In the playoffs, entering as the 8th seed, they managed to oust favorites FUS Rabat in the quarterfinals. After losing to Petro de Luanda in the semifinals and the Rivers Hoopers in the third place game, they finished in fourth place, the best result in Tigers' history.

The Tigers were supposed to play in the 2024 BNL season in July 2024, however, they withdrew because of budgetary reasons.

== Players ==
=== BAL ===
Billy Preston returned to the Tigers after a one year absence from the team, but only played in the conference stage. For the playoffs, the Tigers added former player Dhieu Deing, center Brian Bridgeforth, and Abdou Ndoye. Storm Gilchrist was dropped from the roster before the playoffs.

The following roster includes all players who appeared in a BAL game for the Tigers between March and June 2024.

Note: Flags indicate national team eligibility at FIBA-sanctioned events. Players may hold other non-FIBA nationalities not displayed.

Cape Town Tigers roster
Players
Coaches

Pos.	No.	Nat.	Name	Ht.	Age
SG	1	(South Sudan)	Deing, Dhieu (I)	1.95 m (6 ft 5 in)	25 – 28 August 2001
PG	2	(United States)	Diarra, Cartier (I)	1.90 m (6 ft 3 in)	28 – 6 February 1998
C	7	(South Africa)	Mthembu, Somusa	2.06 m (6 ft 9 in)	34 – 26 March 1992
G	10	(South Africa)	Selepe, Lebesa (C)	1.90 m (6 ft 3 in)	35 – 13 March 1991
SG	11	(South Africa)	Mofokeng, Lebo	1.92 m (6 ft 4 in)	34 – 24 July 1992
SG	12	(South Africa)	Whitbread, Dylan	1.94 m (6 ft 4 in)	32 – 27 October 1994
PF	13	(South Africa)	Gilchrist, Storm	2.07 m (6 ft 9 in)	21 – 6 April 2005
PF	14	(South Africa)	Sibanyoni, Nkosinathi	2.08 m (6 ft 10 in)	28 – 24 May 1998
SF	15	(South Sudan)	Manyang, Ngor (I)	2.01 m (6 ft 7 in)	32 – 13 December 1993
G	23	(South Africa)	Cele, Samkelo	1.94 m (6 ft 4 in)	28 – 28 December 1997
PF	24	(United States)	Preston, Billy (I)	2.06 m (6 ft 9 in)	29 – 26 October 1997
PF/C	28	(United States)	Bridgeforth, Brian (I)	2.10 m (6 ft 11 in)	32 – 3 May 1994
C	34	(Senegal)	Diop, Yakhya (E)	2.13 m (7 ft 0 in)	19 – 12 December 2006
C	45	(Senegal)	Ndoye, Abdou (I)	2.16 m (7 ft 1 in)	36 – 21 November 1989

Head coach

- (South Africa) Florsheim Ngwenya

Assistant coach(es)

- (South Africa) Vincent Ntunja

Legend

- (C) Team captain
- (I) Import player
- (E): BAL Elevate program player
- Injured

- Roster
Updated: 17 March 2024

=== Road to BAL roster ===
Used from October–December 2023.

The following roster was used during the Elite 16 of the Road to BAL.

Cape Town Tigers roster
Players
Coaches

Pos.	No.	Nat.	Name	Ht.	Age
SF	3	(South Africa)	Whitbread, Dylan	1.91 m (6 ft 3 in)	32 – 27 October 1994
G	5	(United States)	Ferguson, Terrance (I)	1.98 m (6 ft 6 in)	28 – 17 May 1998
G	10	(South Africa)	Selepe, Lebesa	1.90 m (6 ft 3 in)	35 – 13 March 1991
G	11	(South Africa)	Mofokeng, Lebohang	1.94 m (6 ft 4 in)	34 – 24 July 1992
PF	14	(South Africa)	Sibanyoni, Nkosinathi	2.08 m (6 ft 10 in)	28 – 24 May 1998
SF	22	(United States)	Larrier, Terry (I)	2.03 m (6 ft 8 in)	31 – 15 August 1995
SF	25	(South Africa)	Cele, Samkelo	1.94 m (6 ft 4 in)	28 – 28 December 1997
C	41	(South Africa)	Prinsloo, Pieter	2.08 m (6 ft 10 in)	34 – 7 January 1992
SG	44	(South Africa)	Bondonno, Luke	1.95 m (6 ft 5 in)	24 – 21 September 2002
C	50	(South Africa)	Gabriel, Christopher	2.11 m (6 ft 11 in)	37 – 19 December 1988

Head coach

- (South Africa) Florsheim Ngwenya

Legend

- (C) Team captain
- (I) Import player
- Injured

- Roster
Updated: 16 December 2023

== Transactions ==
=== In ===
No.	Pos.	Nat.	Name	Age	Moving from		Type	Ends	Date	Source
22	G/F	(United States)	Terry Larier	27	Free agent		Free agent	Undisclosed	September 26, 2023	
5	G	(United States)	Terrance Ferguson	25	GTK Gliwice	(Poland)	Free agent	Undisclosed	September 27, 2023	
9	G	(Mali)	Cartier Diarra	25	Free agent		Free agent	Undisclosed	October 6, 2023	
–	G	(Australia)	Caleb Magua	21	Hornsby Ku-ring-gai Spiders	(Australia)	Free agent	Undisclosed	October 6, 2023	
–	PF	(Senegal)	Lamine Diarra	25	Free agent		Free agent	Undisclosed	October 7, 2023	

=== Out ===
No.	Pos.	Nat.	Name	Age	Moving to		Type	Date	Source
1	G	(Central African Republic)	Evans Ganapamo	28	Bangui Sporting Club	(Central African Republic)	End of contract	September 2023	
41	F	(South Africa)	Pieter Prinsloo	31	Universidad de Concepción	(Chile)	End of contract	December 2023	

== Competitions ==
=== Road to BAL ===
==== Elite 16 ====
21 November 2023 1	Cape Town Tigers (South Africa)	76–61	(Burundi) Dynamo	Ellis Park Arena, Johannesburg
20:00	Scoring by quarter: 17-14, 10-28, 20-8, 29-11
	Pts: Larrier 25; Rebs: Sibanyoni 13; Asts: Larrier 5	Report	Pts: Nijimbere 14; Rebs: Otobo 18; Asts: Morman 4	Referees: Tonton Banza Kalume (DRC), Haytham Ihaqaf (LBY), Diallo Mahamadou (MLI)

22 November 2023 2	Pazi (Tanzania)	87–95	(South Africa) Cape Town Tigers	Ellis Park Arena, Johannesburg
20:00	Scoring by quarter: 25-11, 22-19, 13-31, 21-14
		Report	Pts: Sele 30	Referees: Mbaye Seye (SEN), Wael Mostafa (EGY), Francisco Tando (ANG)

23 November 2023 3	Cape Town Tigers (South Africa)	69–61	(Senegal) NBA Academy Africa	Ellis Park Arena, Johannesburg
14:00	Scoring by quarter: 13-16, 15-14, 19-20, 22-11
		Report		Referees: Claudio Eiuba (ANG), Diallo Mahamadou (MLI), Francisco Tando (ANG)

===== Final round =====
25 November 2023 Semifinal	Cape Town Tigers (South Africa)	67–63	(Madagascar) COSPN	Ellis Park Arena, Johannesburg
19:00	Scoring by quarter: 14–13, 22–12, 18–19, 13–19
		Report		Referees: Wael Mostafa (EGY), Youssouf Maiga (MLI), Haytham Ihaqaf (LBY)

26 November 2023 Final	Cape Town Tigers (South Africa)	70–68	(Uganda) City Oilers	Ellis Park Arena, Johannesburg
14:00	Scoring by quarter: 22–22, 14–15, 24–15, 20–16
		Report		Referees: Diallo Mahamadou (MLI), Tonton Banza Kalume (DRC), Erick Otieno (KEN)

=== Basketball Africa League ===
==== Kalahari Conference ====
Pos	Team	Pld	W	L	PF	PA	PD	PCT	Qualification
1	(Morocco) FUS Rabat	4	3	1	363	295	+68	.750	Advance to playoffs
2	(Angola) Petro de Luanda	4	2	2	360	340	+20	.500	Advance to playoffs
3	(South Africa) Cape Town Tigers (H)	4	1	3	305	346	−41	.250	Advance to playoffs
4	(Burundi) Dynamo (D)	0	0	0	0	0	0	—	Withdrew

Source: BAL
Rules for classification: Tiebreakers
(D) Disqualified; (H) Hosts

The result of the first game day against Dynamo from Burundi was rescinded, as the team was disqualified after the first gameday.

9 March 2024	Cape Town Tigers (South Africa)	73–86	(Burundi) Dynamo	SunBet Arena, Pretoria
3:00 PM (7:00 PM PST)	Scoring by quarter: 15–21, 14–23, 24–22, 20–20
	Pts: Cele 26; Rebs: Sibanyoni, Preston 7 Asts: Sibanyoni 5	Boxscore	Pts: Otobo 21; Rebs: Otobo 13; Asts: Hobbs 8	Attendance: 5,749; Referees: Kevin Fahy, Wael Ibrahim Mostafa, Monicca Nassuuna

10 March 2024	Petro de Luanda (Angola)	100–88	(South Africa) Cape Town Tigers	SunBet Arena, Pretoria
3:00 PM (7:00 PM PST)	Scoring by quarter: 31–14, 16–28, 30–19, 23–27
	Pts: Buiamba, Morais 17; Rebs: Morais, Moreira 8 Asts: Dundão 5	Boxscore	Pts: Manyang 20; Rebs: Sibanyoni 9 Asts: Cele 4	Attendance: 3,576; Referees: Omar Bermudez, Haytham Ihaqaf, Mahamadou Diallo

12 March 2024	Cape Town Tigers (South Africa)	58–84	(Morocco) FUS Rabat	SunBet Arena, Pretoria
3:00 PM (7:00 PM PST)	Scoring by quarter: 18–24, 16–20, 10–27, 14–13
	Pts: Cele 22; Rebs: Sibanyoni 8 Asts: Diarra 3	Boxscore	Pts: Diarra 21; Rebs: Azouga, Najah 7 Asts: Jordan 7	Attendance: 1,050; Referees: Jason Alabanza, Erick Otieno, Dorothy Okatch

16 March 2024	Cape Town Tigers (South Africa)	84–78	(Angola) Petro de Luanda	SunBet Arena, Pretoria
3:00 PM (7:00 PM PST)	Scoring by quarter: 23–21, 24–20, 17–19, 20–18
	Pts: Preston 20; Rebs: Preston 11; Asts: Diarra 9	Boxscore	Pts: Moreira 20; Rebs: Moreira 10; Asts: Morais 7	Attendance: 5,734; Referees: Jason Alabanza, Wael Ibrahim Mostafa, Dorothy Okatch

17 March 2024	FUS Rabat (Morocco)	84–78	(South Africa) Cape Town Tigers	SunBet Arena, Pretoria
3:00 PM (7:00 PM PST)	Scoring by quarter: 15–33, 22–21, 22–25, 25–16
	Pts: Jordan 19; Rebs: Diarra 11; Asts: Nouhi 5	Boxscore	Pts: Cele 24; Rebs: Preston, Sibanyoni 7 Asts: Preston 5	Attendance: 5,827; Referees: Gerda Gatling, Erick Otieno, Didier Gaga

==== Playoffs ====
===== Seeding game =====
24 May 2024	Al Ahly Ly (Libya)	87–67	(South Africa) Cape Town Tigers	BK Arena, Kigali, Rwanda
5:00 PM	Scoring by quarter: 21–25, 26–16, 25–17, 15–18
	Pts: Golden 21; Rebs: Lual-Acuil 8 Asts: Golden 9	Livestats	Pts: Deing 21; Rebs: Sibanyoni 12; Asts: Cele, Diarra 5	Attendance: 3,032; Referees: Pat O'Connell, Kingsley Ojeaburu, Annie Joyce Muchenu

===== Quarterfinals =====
26 May 2024	FUS Rabat (Morocco)	88–91(OT)	(South Africa) Cape Town Tigers	BK Arena, Kigali, Rwanda
5:30 PM	Scoring by quarter: 17–15, 24–29, 18–19, 24–20, Overtime: 5–8
	Pts: Diarra 18; Rebs: Diarra 16; Asts: Jordan 7	Livestats	Pts: Cele 30; Rebs: Sibanyoni 25; Asts: Diarra 8	Attendance: 6,279; Referees: Pat O'Connell, Aboolo Amr, Monicca Nassuunav

===== Semifinals =====
29 May 2024	Petro de Luanda (Angola)	96–86(OT)	(South Africa) Cape Town Tigers	BK Arena, Kigali, Rwanda
8:00 PM	Scoring by quarter: 15–16, 28–21, 23–18, 11–22, Overtime: 19–9
	Pts: Faust 23; Rebs: Moreira 14; Asts: Dundão 7	Livestats	Pts: Cele 19; Rebs: Sibanyoni 13; Asts: Diarra 6	Attendance: 6,072; Referees: Pat O'Connell, Kalume Tonton Banza, Annie Joyce Muchenu

===== Third place =====
31 May 2024	Rivers Hoopers (Nigeria)	80–57	(South Africa) Cape Town Tigers	BK Arena, Kigali, Rwanda
8:00 PM	Scoring by quarter: 25–8, 18–21, 20–9, 17–19
	Pts: Amayo 25; Rebs: Koko 11; Asts: Perry 8	Livestats	Pts: Deing 17; Rebs: Sibanyoni 15; Asts: Manyang, Whitbread 2	Attendance: 4,379; Referees: Julian Scott, Wael Ibrahim Mostafa, Kalume Tonton Banza

== Player statistics ==
Legend
GP	Games played	GS	Games started	MPG	Minutes per game
FG%	Field-goal percentage	3P%	3-point field-goal percentage	FT%	Free-throw percentage
RPG	Rebounds per game	APG	Assists per game	SPG	Steals per game
BPG	Blocks per game	PPG	Points per game

=== BAL ===
Cape Town Tigers statistics
Player	GP	MPG	FG%	3FG%	FT%	RPG	APG	SPG	BPG	PPG
Dylan Whitbread	8	14.9	.361	.304	1.000	1.6	0.8	0.3	0.0	4.4
Storm Gilchrist	3	13.6	.273	.000	.286	3.0	0.7	0.3	0.3	2.7
Nkosinathi Sibanyoni	8	30.8	.395	.111	.385	12.3	1.5	1.3	0.9	9.4
Lebesa Selepe	4	10.2	.143	.167	.000	1.3	1.0	0.3	0.0	0.8
Billy Preston	4	27.0	.460	.500	.769	6.3	3.0	1.0	0.3	15.8
Mouhamadou N'doye	4	26.5	.367	.000	.400	4.5	0.8	0.8	3.5	6.0
Somusa Mthembu	7	5.7	.333	.000	.000	2.1	0.1	0.1	0.0	0.6
Lebohang Mofokeng	6	6.9	.000	.000	.500	1.2	0.2	0.5	0.0	0.3
Ngor Manyang	8	26.5	.292	.259	.867	2.8	1.1	1.0	0.1	8.8
Yakhya Diop	5	3.7	.250	.000	.222	1.0	0.0	0.0	0.0	0.8
Cartier Diarra	7	35.0	.432	.290	.667	3.7	5.0	1.1	0.0	13.3
Dhieu Deing	4	33.0	.308	.265	.750	4.5	2.8	0.8	0.3	15.3
Samkelo Cele	7	33.8	.389	.268	.760	4.6	2.7	2.4	0.1	21.0
Brian Bridgeforth	4	15.8	.500	.000	.333	5.8	0.3	1.3	0.8	6.5
