= 2023–24 Al-Ahly Ly SC basketball season =

Al Ahly Ly
- Chairman: Khaled Mohamed
- Head coach: • Aoun Monaem (Road to BAL) • Ivan Jeremić (BAL)
- BAL: Conference: 2nd place (Nile)
- Playoffs: Runners-up (lost to Petro de Luanda)
- Libyan Division 1: Runners-up (lost to Al Ahli Tripoli)
- Scoring leader: (United States) Trae Golden 21.6
- Rebounding leader: (South Sudan) Jo Lual-Acuil 9.7
- Assists leader: (United States) Trae Golden 7.8

The Al Ahly Ly men's basketball team played the 2023–24 season domestically in the Libyan Division I Basketball League and internationally in the Basketball Africa League (BAL).

Al-Ahly Ly was the first Libyan team to play in the BAL, and reached the final, where they lost to Petro de Luanda. In domestic play, they lost the Division 1 finals to Al Ahli Tripoli.

== Overview ==
Following their title in the previous season, Al Ahly became the second Libyan team to play in the Road to BAL. They strengthened their squad with BAL star players such as Ater Majok (former Defensive Player of the Year), Solo Diabate (two-time BAL champion) and Chris Crawford. Al Ahly Ly was coached by the Tunisian coach Aoun Monaem. In November, they won the third place game against FAP of Cameroon, and thus qualified for the BAL as the first team ever from the country.

In March 2024, Al Ahly won the Libyan Supercup.

On April 19, 2024, it was revealed that Ivan Jeremić was the head coach for Al Ahly Ly's BAL campaign. Of the import players that played in the Road to BAL, only Solo Diabate remained.

In July 2024, they lost the Libyan Division I Basketball League finals to Al Ahli Tripoli, and as such would not play in the Road to BAL for the next season.

== Players ==
=== Road to BAL roster (November) ===
The following roster played in the 2024 BAL qualification.

Al Ahly Ly roster
Players
Coaches

Pos.	No.	Nat.	Name	Ht.	Age
G	1	(United States)	Lofton, Zach	1.95 m (6 ft 5 in)	33 – 18 November 1992
C	3	(South Sudan)	Majok, Ater	2.10 m (6 ft 11 in)	38 – 4 July 1987
SG	6	(United States)	Crawford, Chris	1.94 m (6 ft 4 in)	33 – 30 September 1992
F	8	(Libya)	Zeew, Adrees	1.98 m (6 ft 6 in)	25 – 10 May 2000
PF	9	(Libya)	Hamad, Sofian	2.01 m (6 ft 7 in)	27 – 16 October 1998
PG	10	(Ivory Coast)	Diabate, Solo	1.83 m (6 ft 0 in)	38 – 21 July 1987
C	12	(Libya)	Aldirfili, Omar	2.05 m (6 ft 9 in)	28 – 2 March 1997
C	13	(Libya)	Elmansouri, Anis Zaid Ali	2.05 m (6 ft 9 in)	30 – 4 January 1995
SG	14	(Libya)	Aljahmi, Asmaeil	2.03 m (6 ft 8 in)	26 – 28 September 1999
PG	19	(Libya)	Alrashidi, Rasheed	1.78 m (5 ft 10 in)	22 – 1 December 2003
PF	23	(Libya)	Almaghribi, Ghayth Alrahman	2.04 m (6 ft 8 in)	26 – 25 January 1999
PG	30	(Libya)	Benalhaj, Mahmoud Abdalla	1.89 m (6 ft 2 in)	34 – 25 January 1991

Head coach

- (Tunisia) Aoun Monaem

Legend

- (C) Team captain
- Injured

- Roster
Updated: 2 November 2023

=== BAL roster (April – June) ===
The following was Al Ahly Ly's roster in the 2024 BAL season.

Note: Flags indicate national team eligibility at FIBA-sanctioned events. Players may hold other non-FIBA nationalities not displayed.

2024 BAL season Al Ahly Ly roster
Players
Coaches

Pos.	No.	Nat.	Name	Ht.	Age
PG	2	(Senegal)	Mandian, Assane (E)	196 m (643 ft 1 in)
G/F	4	(United States)	Murphy, Kevin	189 m (620 ft 1 in)	35 – 6 March 1990
SG	6	(Libya)	Zew, Adrees	197 m (646 ft 4 in)	25 – 10 May 2000
G	7	(Libya)	Alrashidi, Rasheed	180 m (590 ft 7 in)	22 – 12 January 2003
PG	10	(Ivory Coast)	Diabaté, Solo	183 m (600 ft 5 in)	38 – 21 July 1987
CG	12	(United States)	Golden, Trae	185 m (606 ft 11 in)	30 – 10 May 1995
PF	14	(Libya)	Aljahmi, Asmaeil	230 m (754 ft 7 in)	26 – 28 September 1999
CG	15	(Libya)	Benalhaj, Mahmoud	189 m (620 ft 1 in)	34 – 25 January 1991
PF	24	(Libya)	Hamad, Sofian (C)	208 m (682 ft 5 in)	27 – 16 October 1998
PF	28	(South Sudan)	Deng, Majok	204 m (669 ft 3 in)	32 – 3 January 1993
F/C	34	(Libya)	Almaghribi, Ghayth	206 m (675 ft 10 in)	26 – 25 January 1999
F	41	(South Sudan)	Lual-Acuil, Jo	213 m (698 ft 10 in)	31 – 26 April 1994
F/C	50	(Libya)	Aldirfeeli, Omar	206 m (675 ft 10 in)	28 – 2 March 1997

Head coach

- (Serbia) Ivan Jeremić

Assistant coach(es)

- (Serbia) Vasilj Duric

Legend

- (C) Team captain
- Injured

- Roster
Updated: 29 May 2024

== Competitions ==
=== Road to BAL ===
==== First phase ====
Al Ahly Benghazi received an automatic bye for the first phase after two other teams in Group A withdrew and it was left only with FUS Rabat in the group.

==== Elite 16 ====
===== Group phase =====
1 November 2023 1	Al Ahly Benghazi (Libya)	86–77	(Cameroon) FAP	Yaoundé
20:00	Scoring by quarter: 21-18, 24-16, 20-23, 21-20
	Pts: Lofton 25; Rebs: Majok 11; Asts: Diabate 9	Report	Pts: Kome 22; Rebs: Doucoure 10; Asts: Tametong 4	Arena: Yaoundé Multipurpose Sports Complex; Referees: Claudio Eiuba (ANG), Didier Gaga (RWA), Zouhir Bouhabba (MAR)

2 November 2023 2	Virunga (Democratic Republic of the Congo)	73–84	(Libya) Al Ahly Benghazi	Yaoundé
20:00	Scoring by quarter: 22-14, 15-19, 17-29, 19-22
	Pts: Three players 11; Rebs: Betoudji 9 Asts: Ngoy 5	Report	Pts: Lofton 32; Rebs: Majok 11; Asts: Crawford 5	Arena: Yaoundé Multipurpose Sports Complex; Referees: Hassane Kamate (CIV), Walelign Gebeto (ETH), Oumar Sy (MRI)

===== Final phase =====
4 November 2023 Semifinal	Al Ahly Benghazi (Libya)	85–87	(Central African Republic) Bangui Sporting Club	Yaoundé
17:00	Scoring by quarter: 23-14, 29-32, 22-21, 11-20
	Pts: Hamad 20; Rebs: Majok 12; Asts: Crawford 6	Report	Pts: Ganapamo 22; Rebs: Kouguère 9 Asts: Johnson 5	Arena: Yaoundé Multipurpose Sports Complex; Referees: Walelign Gebeto (ETH), Didier Gaga (RWA), Adlen Larouci (ALG)

5 November 2023 Third place game	Al Ahly Benghazi (Libya)	93–84	(Cameroon) FAP	Yaoundé
20:00	Scoring by quarter: 21-17, 27-16, 28-13, 17-28
	Pts: Crawford 39; Rebs: Majok 8 Asts: Diabate 12	Report	Pts: Tametong 26; Rebs: Friday 11; Asts: Keumoe 6	Arena: Yaoundé Multipurpose Sports Complex; Referees: Sara Elsharnouby (EGY), Walelign Gebeto (ETH), Adlen Larouci (ALG)

=== BAL ===
==== Nile Conference ====
Pos	Team	Pld	W	L	PF	PA	PD	PCT	Qualification
1	(Egypt) Al Ahly (H)	6	5	1	544	470	+74	.833	Advance to playoffs
2	(Libya) Al Ahly Ly	6	3	3	537	498	+39	.500 (Note: Head-to-head: Al Ahly Ly and Bangui SC were tied 1–1 in their games, +19 point differential for Al Ahly Ly over these two games.)	Advance to playoffs
3	(Central African Republic) Bangui SC	6	3	3	509	529	−20	.500	
4	(Uganda) City Oilers	6	1	5	468	561	−93	.167	

Source: BAL
Rules for classification: Tiebreakers
(H) Hosts
Notes:

19 April 2024 1	Al Ahly Ly (Libya)	93–71	(Central African Republic) Bangui SC	Hassan Moustafa Sports Hall, 6th of October
4:00 PM	Scoring by quarter: 23–29, 31–13, 18–16, 21–13
	Pts: Murphy 21; Rebs: Deng 8 Asts: Jackson 11	Livestats	Pts: Fula Nganga 19; Rebs: Nwabuzor 9 Asts: Nwabuzor 4	Attendance: 975; Referees: Kaz Beverly, Sara Elsharnouby, Claudio Eiuba

20 April 2024 2	Al Ahly (Egypt)	98–88	(Libya) Al Ahly Ly	Hassan Moustafa Sports Hall, 6th of October
7:00 PM	Scoring by quarter: 20–21, 22–18, 27–19, 29–28
	Pts: Lyons 20; Rebs: Three players 6 Asts: Gendy 5	Livestats	Pts: Jackson 26; Rebs: Lual-Acuil 9 Asts: Diabate, Jackson 5	Attendance: 2,115; Referees: Kenneth Gardner, Jean Sauveur Ruhamiriza, Amir Taboubi

22 April 2024 3	City Oilers (Uganda)	68–79	(Libya) Al Ahly Ly	Hassan Moustafa Sports Hall, 6th of October
4:00 PM	Scoring by quarter: 11–25, 13–25, 24–11, 20–18
	Pts: Rembert 17; Rebs: Maluach 19; Asts: Baale, Rembert 2	Livestats	Pts: Lual-Acuil 22; Rebs: Diabate 9 Asts: Diabate 11	Attendance: 450; Referees: Kladji Mulla, Amir Taboubi, Oumar Sy

24 April 2024 4	Bangui SC (Central African Republic)	96–93	(Libya) Al Ahly Ly	Hassan Moustafa Sports Hall, 6th of October
4:00 PM	Scoring by quarter: 15–16, 32–29, 24–12, 25–34
	Pts: Fula Nganga 30; Rebs: Darlan 14; Asts: Wegscheider 6	Livestats	Pts: Lual-Acuil 22; Rebs: Lual-Acuil 10; Asts: Diabate, Jackson 5	Attendance: 453; Referees: Kelsey Reynolds, Mbaye Seye, Sara Elsharnouby

26 April 2024 5	Al Ahly Ly (Libya)	76–87	(Egypt) Al Ahly	Hassan Moustafa Sports Hall, 6th of October
7:00 PM	Scoring by quarter: 21–25, 24–17, 18–27, 13–18
	Pts: Lual-Acuil 26; Rebs: Lual-Acuil 15; Asts: Jackson 10	Livestats	Pts: Mitchell 16; Rebs: Amin, Oraby 9 Asts: Lyons 7	Attendance: Kladji Mulla, Mbaye Seye, Amir Taboubi; Referees: 2,730

27 April 2024 6	Al Ahly Ly (Libya)	110–78	(Uganda) City Oilers	Hassan Moustafa Sports Hall, 6th of October
4:00 PM	Scoring by quarter: 20–22, 32–20, 23–24, 35–12
	Pts: Lual-Acuil 42; Rebs: Lual-Acuil 13; Asts: Diabate 8	Livestats	Pts: Ahmed, Culpepper 14; Rebs: Maluach 13; Asts: Miller Jr. 10	Attendance: 435; Referees: Kenneth Gardner, Annie Joyce Muchenu, Claudio Eiuba

==== Playoffs ====
===== Seeding game =====
24 May 2024	Al Ahly Ly (Libya)	87–67	(South Africa) Cape Town Tigers	BK Arena, Kigali, Rwanda
5:00 PM	Scoring by quarter: 21–25, 26–16, 25–17, 15–18
	Pts: Golden 21; Rebs: Lual-Acuil 8 Asts: Golden 9	Livestats	Pts: Deing 21; Rebs: Sibanyoni 12; Asts: Cele, Diarra 5	Attendance: 3,032; Referees: Pat O'Connell, Kingsley Ojeaburu, Annie Joyce Muchenu

===== Quarterfinal =====
26 May 2024	Al Ahly (Egypt)	77–86	(Libya) Al Ahly Ly	BK Arena, Kigali, Rwanda
2:30 PM	Scoring by quarter: 14–15, 22–23, 13–17, 28–31
	Pts: Mitchell 17; Rebs: Oraby 6 Asts: Lyons 10	Livestats	Pts: Deng 25; Rebs: Lual-Acuil 11; Asts: Golden 10	Attendance: 2,775; Referees: Julian Scott, Jean Sauveur Ruhamiriza, Amir Taboubi

===== Semifinal =====
29 May 2024	Rivers Hoopers (Nigeria)	83–89OT	(Libya) Al Ahly Ly	BK Arena, Kigali, Rwanda
5:00 PM	Scoring by quarter: 21–27, 16–21, 23–8, 13–70, Overtime: 10–16
	Pts: Amayo 26; Rebs: Amayo 15; Asts: Amayo 6	Livestats	Pts: Lual-Acuil 27; Rebs: Deng 13; Asts: Golden 5	Attendance: 4,037; Referees: Chelisa Painter, Yann Vezo Davidson, Mbaye Seye

===== Final =====
1 June 2024	Petro de Luanda (Angola)	107–94	(Libya) Al Ahly Ly	BK Arena, Kigali, Rwanda
4:00 PM	Scoring by quarter: 26–24, 14–28, 35–23, 32–19
	Pts: Faust 24; Rebs: Gonçalves 8 Asts: Gonçalves 8	Livestats	Pts: Deng 24; Rebs: Lual-Acuil 9 Asts: Golden 8	Attendance: 6,404; Referees: Hortencia Sánchez, Yann Davidson, Jean Sauveur Ruhamiriza

=== Dubai International Basketball Championship ===
23 January 2024 Gameday 1	Al Riyadi Beirut (Lebanon)	93–81	(Libya) Al Ahly Benghazi	Dubai
11:15
		Report		Arena: Hall Alnasr Club

25 January 2024 Gameday 2	Sagesse (Lebanon)	77–74	(Libya) Al Ahly Benghazi	Dubai
15:15
		Report		Arena: Hall Alnasr Club

26 January 2024 Quarterfinal	Al Ahli Benghazi (Libya)	67–81	(Libya) Al Ahli Tripoli	Dubai
11:15
		Report		Arena: Hall Alnasr Club

=== Libyan SuperCup ===
15 March 2024 Final	Al Ahly Benghazi	57–55	Al-Ittihad
		Report

=== Libyan Basketball League ===
==== First round ====
March 9, 2024	Al Ahly Benghazi	100–77	Al Hilal
		Report

March 15, 2024	Al Ittihad Al Marj	53–115	Al Ahly Benghazi
		Report

March 23, 2024	Al Hilal	70–88	Al Ahly Benghazi
		Report

March 25, 2024	Al Ahly Benghazi	80–54	Al Ittihad Al Marj
		Report

== Player statistics ==
Legend
GP	Games played	GS	Games started	MPG	Minutes per game
FG%	Field-goal percentage	3P%	3-point field-goal percentage	FT%	Free-throw percentage
RPG	Rebounds per game	APG	Assists per game	SPG	Steals per game
BPG	Blocks per game	PPG	Points per game

=== BAL ===
Al Ahly Ly statistics
Player	GP	MPG	FG%	3FG%	FT%	RPG	APG	SPG	BPG	PPG
Trae Golden	4	36.7	.532	.483	.875	4.0	7.8	0.0	0.0	21.3
Jo Acuil	10	31.9	.583	.000	.537	9.7	1.9	0.8	1.6	21.1
Kevin Murphy	9	36.1	.371	.367	.743	3.7	3.1	0.7	0.2	15.8
Majok Deng	10	30.5	.491	.441	.763	7.1	1.7	0.6	0.7	15.0
Pierre Jackson	5	26.1	.431	.385	.813	3.0	5.6	2.2	0.0	13.4
Solo Diabate	10	32.0	.495	.304	.842	4.7	5.8	1.8	0.4	11.3
Ghayth Almaghribi	10	13.5	.447	.000	.769	4.0	0.3	0.3	0.6	5.2
Sofian Hamad	10	17.6	.435	.083	.700	3.9	0.6	0.6	0.3	4.8
Adrees Zeew	6	6.5	.429	1.000	.500	1.5	0.3	0.3	0.0	1.7
Rasheed Alrashidi	2	2.0	.500	.500	.000	0.0	0.0	0.5	0.0	1.5
Mahmoud Benalhaj	10	11.6	.364	.400	.500	1.9	0.9	0.7	0.0	1.2
Assane Mandian	1	2.3	.000	.000	.000	0.0	1.0	0.0	0.0	0.0
Asmaeil Aljahmi	2	2.0	.000	.000	.000	0.5	0.0	0.0	0.0	0.0
Anis Almansouri	1	2.3	.000	.000	.000	0.0	0.0	0.0	0.0	0.0
