= 2023–24 Petro de Luanda basketball season =

Petro de Luanda
- BAL champions
- Angolan Basketball League champions
- {{{champions3_league}}} champions
- Chairman: Tomás Faria
- Head coach: José Neto (November – March; 4th season); Sergio Valdeolmillos (From March; 1st season)
- BAL: Champions (lost to Al-Ahly Ly)
- Unitel Basket: Champions (defeated Interclube)
- Angolan Cup: Runners-up (lost to Interclube)
- Angolan Supercup: Winners
- Biggest win: 90 points Petro de Luanda 129–39 Clube Amigos de Benguela (3 February 2024)

Petro de Luanda plays the 2023–24 season in the Angolan Basketball League and the Basketball Africa League (BAL), as well as in two national cup competitions. This season saw Petro win their first BAL championship.

The team came off a successful domestic season in 2022–23, which included Petro's 16th national title. It is the fourth season under Brazilian head coach José Neto. The team strengthened their roster with Angolan star players Edmir Lucas and Yanick Moreira – both had played for Petro earlier in their career.

In March 2024, following disappointing results in the conference stage of the BAL, Petro and José Neto decided to part ways. Four days later, Sergio Valdeolmillos was hired as successor. Following a runner-up finish in the Angolan Cup and a sixteenth Angolan League title, Petro also won the BAL on 1 June 2024.

== Roster ==
Note: Flags indicate national team eligibility at FIBA-sanctioned events. Players may hold other non-FIBA nationalities not displayed.

Petro de Luanda roster
Players
Coaches

Pos.	No.	Nat.	Name	Ht.	Age
PG	0	(Angola)	Domingos, Gerson	1.74 m (5 ft 9 in)	30 – 16 April 1996
PG	1	(Angola)	Neto, Aginaldo (E)	1.87 m (6 ft 2 in)	20 – 29 April 2006
PG	2	(Angola)	Moreira, Yanick	2.11 m (6 ft 11 in)	35 – 31 July 1991
F	4	(United States)	Cummings, Markeith (I)	1.98 m (6 ft 6 in)	37 – 21 December 1988
PG	5	(Angola)	Dundão, Childe	1.72 m (5 ft 8 in)	28 – 17 May 1998
SG	6	(Angola)	Morais, Carlos (C)	1.92 m (6 ft 4 in)	41 – 16 October 1985
C	7	(Angola)	Pedro, Jone	2.08 m (6 ft 10 in)	36 – 28 May 1990
G/F	10	(Angola)	Gonçalves, Gerson	1.96 m (6 ft 5 in)	30 – 29 March 1996
PG	12	(Angola)	Simão, Eduardo	1.98 m (6 ft 6 in)	22 – 6 February 2004
F/C	13	(Angola)	Castro, Clesio	1.98 m (6 ft 6 in)	29 – 22 February 1997
F	15	(Angola)	Gakou, Aboubakar	2.02 m (6 ft 8 in)	29 – 27 May 1997
SG	23	(United States)	Faust, Nick (I)	1.98 m (6 ft 6 in)	34 – 25 February 1992
SF	24	(Angola)	Buiamba, Glofate	2.00 m (6 ft 7 in)	27 – 5 January 1999

Head coach

- (Spain) Sergio Valdeolmillos

Assistant coach(es)

- (Angola) Raúl Duarte

Legend

- (C) Team captain
- (I) Import player
- Injured

- Roster
Updated: 17 March 2024

=== Former players ===
The following players played with Petro in the conference phase, but not in the playoffs.

Pos.	No.	Nat.	Name	Ht.	Age
SG	41	(Angola)	Lucas, Edmir	1.91 m (6 ft 3 in)	33 – 7 March 1993
PG	11	(United States)	Nelson, Anthony	1.93 m (6 ft 4 in)	28 – 20 October 1998

== Transactions ==
=== In ===
No.	Pos.	Nat.	Name	Age	Moving from		Type	Ends	Date	Source
47	G	(Angola)	Edmir Lucas	30	Interclube	(Angola)	Free agent	1 year	October 16, 2023	
2	F/C	(Angola)	Yanick Moreira	26	Hapoel Afula	(Israel)	Free agent	1 year	December 5, 2023	
4	F	(United States)	Markeith Cummings	34	Abejas de Léon	(Mexico)	Free agent	Undisclosed	February 26, 2024	
11	PG	(United States)	Anthony Nelson	24	Free agent		Free agent	Undisclosed	February 26, 2023	
1	PG	(Angola)	Aginaldo Neto	17	NBA Academy Africa	(Senegal)	Drafted	Undisclosed		

=== Out ===
No.	Pos.	Nat.	Name	Age	Moving to		Type	Date	Source
0	G	(Ivory Coast)	Solo Diabate	36	Al Ahli Benghazi	(Libya)	End of contract		
13	C	(South Sudan)	Ater Majok	36	Patriots	(Rwanda)	End of contract	August 2023	
45	F	(United States)	Damian Hollis	34	Astros de Jalisco	(Mexico)	End of contract	March 1, 2024	

== Competitions ==
=== Angolan Basketball League ===
==== Regular season ====
Gameday	Date	Opponents	H / A	Result	Record
1	18 November	F.C. Vila Clotilde	H	L 86–88	0–1
2	24 November	Jesus Cristo Basquetebol	A	W 74–104	1–1
3	25 November	Akiras Academy	H	W 94–52	2–1
4	1 December	Petro de Luanda B	A	W 57–114	3–1
5	2 December	Interclube	H	W 104–76	4–1
6	8 December	Primeiro de Agosto	A	W 81–83	5–1
7	10 December	CPPL	H	W 108–71	6–1
8	14 December	CD Kwanza	H	W 151–61	7–1
9	15 December	Interclube B	A	W 74–84	8–1
10	20 December	ASA	A	W 71–93	9–1
11	22 December	Clube Amigos de Benguela	A	W 51–130	10–1
12	28 December	ASA	H	W 119–74	11–1
13	5 January	FC Vila Clotilde	A	W 75–82	12–1
14	6 January	Jesus Cristo	H	W 119–45	13–1
15	12 January	Akiras Academy	A	W 49–129	14–1
16	13 January	Petro de Luanda B	H	W 132–97	15–1
17	19 January	Interclube	A	W 108–102	16–1
18	20 January	Primeiro de Agosto	H	W 110–97	17–1
19	25 January	CPPL	A	W 62–100	18–1
20	28 January	Interclube B	H	W 97–68	19–1
21	1 February	CD Kwanza	A	W 67–130	20–1
22	3 February	Clube Amigos de Benguela	H	W 129–39	21–1

==== Playoffs ====
===== Quarterfinals =====
Game	Date	Opponents	H / A	Result	Record
1	4 April 2024	Interclube B	H	W 111–57	1–0
2	6 April 2024	Interclube B	A	W 59–100	20–1

===== Semifinals =====
Game	Date	Opponents	H / A	Result	Record
1	24 April 2024	CPPL	H	W 100–66	1–0
2	27 April 2024	CPPL	A	W 91–92	2–0

===== Finals =====
Game	Date	Opponents	H / A	Result	Record
1	3 May 2024	Interclube	H	W 92–81	1–0
2	5 May 2024	Interclube	H	L 92–97	1–1
3	9 May 2024	Interclube	A	W 62–80	2–1
4	11 May 2024	Interclube	A	W 67–81	3–1

=== Angolan Super Cup ===
Gameday	Date	Opponents	H / A	Result
Final	11 November	Interclube	H	W 93–87

=== BAL ===
==== Kalahari Conference ====
===== Standings =====
Pos	Team	Pld	W	L	PF	PA	PD	PCT	Qualification
1	(Morocco) FUS Rabat	4	3	1	363	295	+68	.750	Advance to playoffs
2	(Angola) Petro de Luanda	4	2	2	360	340	+20	.500	Advance to playoffs
3	(South Africa) Cape Town Tigers (H)	4	1	3	305	346	−41	.250	Advance to playoffs
4	(Burundi) Dynamo (D)	0	0	0	0	0	0	—	Withdrew

Source: BAL
Rules for classification: Tiebreakers
(D) Disqualified; (H) Hosts

9 March 2024 1	Petro de Luanda (Angola)	73–82	(Morocco) FUS Rabat	SunBet Arena, Pretoria
12:00 PM (4:00 PM PST)	Scoring by quarter: 17–23, 14–18, 24–25, 18–16
	Pts: Morais 19; Rebs: Gakou 7 Asts: Dundão 4	Boxscore	Pts: Jordan 20; Rebs: Diarra 10; Asts: Four players 3	Attendance: 2,727; Referees: Gerda Gatling, Arnold Moseya, Didier Gaga

10 March 2024 2	Petro de Luanda (Angola)	100–88	(South Africa) Cape Town Tigers	SunBet Arena, Pretoria
3:00 PM (7:00 PM PST)	Scoring by quarter: 31–14, 16–28, 30–19, 23–27
	Pts: Buiamba, Morais 17; Rebs: Morais, Moreira 8 Asts: Dundão 5	Boxscore	Pts: Manyang 20; Rebs: Sibanyoni 9 Asts: Cele 4	Attendance: 3,576; Referees: Omar Bermudez, Haytham Ihaqaf, Mahamadou Diallo

14 March 2024 3	FUS Rabat (Morocco)	86–89	(Angola) Petro de Luanda	SunBet Arena, Pretoria
3:00 PM (7:00 PM PST)	Scoring by quarter: 25–25, 9–21, 23–29, 29–24
	Pts: Jordan 18; Rebs: Diarra 7 Asts: Three players 4	Boxscore	Pts: Dundão 25; Rebs: Gakou 10; Asts: Three players 4	Attendance: 1,551; Referees: Kevin Fahy, Arnold Moseya, Monicca Nassuuna

16 March 2024 4	Cape Town Tigers (South Africa)	84–78	(Angola) Petro de Luanda	SunBet Arena, Pretoria
3:00 PM (7:00 PM PST)	Scoring by quarter: 23–21, 24–20, 17–19, 20–18
	Pts: Preston 20; Rebs: Preston 11; Asts: Diarra 9	Boxscore	Pts: Moreira 20; Rebs: Moreira 10; Asts: Morais 7	Attendance: 5,734; Referees: Jason Alabanza, Wael Ibrahim Mostafa, Dorothy Okatch

==== Playoffs ====
===== Seeding game (5th–6th seed) =====
25 May 2024	Petro de Luanda (Angola)	67–70	(Tunisia) US Monastir	BK Arena, Kigali, Rwanda
2:30 PM	Scoring by quarter: 13–16, 25–17, 16–19, 13–18
	Pts: Faust 12; Rebs: Gakou 8 Asts: Gonçalves 7	Livestats	Pts: Lahyani 19; Rebs: Lahyani 9 Asts: Crawford 11	Attendance: 2,663; Referees: Chelisa Painter, Mbaye Seye, Kalume Tonton Banza

===== Quarterfinals =====
27 May 2024	AS Douanes (Senegal)	65–66	(Angola) Petro de Luanda	BK Arena, Kigali, Rwanda
8:00 PM	Scoring by quarter: 8–13, 17–15, 31–14, 9–24
	Pts: Boissy 28; Rebs: Akec, Diakhite 9 Asts: Harouna 5	Livestats	Pts: Faust 13; Rebs: Moreira 9 Asts: Buiamba 5	Attendance: 5,470; Referees: Hortensia Sanchez-Carrizales, Kingsley Ojeaburu, Monicca Nassuuna

===== Semifinals =====
29 May 2024	Petro de Luanda (Angola)	96–86OT	(South Africa) Cape Town Tigers	BK Arena, Kigali, Rwanda
8:00 PM	Scoring by quarter: 15–16, 28–21, 23–18, 11–22, Overtime: 19–9
	Pts: Faust 23; Rebs: Moreira 14; Asts: Dundão 7	Livestats	Pts: Cele 19; Rebs: Sibanyoni 13; Asts: Diarra 6	Attendance: 6,072; Referees: Pat O'Connell, Kalume Tonton Banza, Annie Joyce Muchenu

===== Final =====
1 June 2024	Petro de Luanda (Angola)	107–94	(Libya) Al Ahly Ly	BK Arena, Kigali, Rwanda
4:00 PM	Scoring by quarter: 26–24, 14–28, 35–23, 32–19
	Pts: Faust 24; Rebs: Gonçalves 8 Asts: Gonçalves 8	Livestats	Pts: Deng 24; Rebs: Lual-Acuil 9 Asts: Golden 8	Attendance: 6,404; Referees: Hortencia Sánchez, Yann Davidson, Jean Sauveur Ruhamiriza

== Player statistics ==
Legend
GP	Games played	GS	Games started	MPG	Minutes per game
FG%	Field-goal percentage	3P%	3-point field-goal percentage	FT%	Free-throw percentage
RPG	Rebounds per game	APG	Assists per game	SPG	Steals per game
BPG	Blocks per game	PPG	Points per game

Petro de Luanda statistics
Player	GP	MPG	FG%	3FG%	FT%	RPG	APG	SPG	BPG	PPG
Nick Faust^{≠}	4	21.7	.500	.417	.583	2.5	2.3	1.5	0.3	18.0
Childe Dundão	8	28.7	.333	.283	.731	3.3	3.9	0.9	0.0	10.8
Yanick Moreira	8	20.1	.516	.000	.737	8.0	1.5	0.6	0.8	10.0
Aboubakar Gakou	8	22.7	.400	.222	.739	5.8	0.5	0.5	0.3	8.4
Gerson Gonçalves	8	26.7	.387	.314	.571	4.5	4.3	1.5	0.1	8.4
Anthony Nelson^{~}	4	18.1	.355	.286	.900	2.3	2.3	0.5	0.5	8.3
Markeith Cummings	8	18.0	.413	.211	.500	3.8	1.1	0.3	0.0	7.9
Jone Pedro	7	17.1	.606	.000	.765	4.9	1.3	0.7	1.1	7.6
Carlos Morais	8	19.7	.286	.263	.722	3.4	2.3	0.6	0.1	6.9
Glofate Buiamba	8	17.7	.395	.267	.696	2.6	0.9	1.3	0.1	6.3
Clesio Castro^{≠}	3	11.7	.778	.000	.667	3.7	0.7	1.0	0.3	6.0
Edmir Lucas^{~}	2	10.8	.429	.400	.000	1.0	0.0	0.5	0.0	4.0
Gerson Domingos	6	9.1	.333	.250	.500	0.3	1.3	0.2	0.0	3.0
Aginaldo Neto	3	2.4	.500	.000	1.000	0.0	0.7	0.0	0.0	2.0

^{≠}Acquired during the season
^{~}Released during the season
