= Nile Conference =

Conference of the Basketball Africa League

- League: Basketball Africa League
- Sport: Basketball
- Founded: 2022
- First season: 2022
- No. of teams: 4 (2024–present); 6 (2022–2023)
- Most recent champion: (Libya) Al Ahli Tripoli (1st title) (2025)
- Most titles: Four different teams (1 title each)
- 2026 BAL Sahara Conference

The Nile Conference is one of the three conferences that make up the Basketball Africa League (BAL), the other two being the Sahara Conference and the Kalahari Conference. All conferences currently consist of four teams.

The conference alignment began in the 2022 season, although plans to have conferences were already set up before the inaugural season. Named after the Nile River, the conference has been played at a single venue thus far, the Hassan Moustafa Sports Hall in Cairo, Egypt for the past two seasons.

== Venues ==
From 2022 to 2024, all games of the Nile Conference were played at the Hassan Moustafa Sports Hall located in Cairo, Egypt. (Note: Officially, the Hassan Moustafa Sports Hall is located in the town of 6th of October City.) In 2025, the conference was played in the BK Arena in Kigali, Rwanda.

== Current standings ==
Pos	Team	Pld	W	L	PF	PA	PD	PCT	Qualification
1	(Libya) Al Ahli Tripoli	6	6	0	604	498	+106	1.000	Advance to playoffs
2	(Rwanda) APR (H)	6	3	3	530	508	+22	.500	Advance to playoffs
3	(South Africa) MBB	6	2	4	476	539	−63	.333	
4	(Kenya) Nairobi City Thunder	6	1	5	474	539	−65	.167	

Source: BAL
Rules for classification: Tiebreakers
(H) Hosts

== Conference winners ==
Although no official trophy or title is awarded, the team ending at the top of the standings in the conference is lauded as "Conference winners" by the BAL.

Nile Conference results
Season	Winners	Conference record	Playoffs result	Ref.
2022 (Details)	(Egypt) Zamalek (EGY)	5–0 (1.000)	Won third place game	
2023 (Details)	(Angola) Petro de Luanda (ANG)	5–0 (1.000)	Lost third place game	
2024 (Details)	(Egypt) Al Ahly (EGY)	5–1 (.833)	Quarterfinalist	
2025 (Details)	(Libya) Al Ahli Tripoli (LBY)	6–0 (1.000)	Champions	

=== Titles by team ===
Team	Titles	Season(s) won
(Egypt) Zamalek	1	2022
(Angola) Petro de Luanda	1	2023
(Egypt) Al Ahly	1	2024
(Libya) Al Ahli Tripoli	1	2025

== Standings ==
^	Denotes team that won the BAL championship
^{+}	Denotes team that lost in the BAL finals
*	Denotes team that qualified for the BAL playoffs

Season	Positions (by team)					
Season	1st	2nd	3rd	4th	5th	6th
2022	Zamalek* (5–0)	Petro de Luanda^{+} (4–1)	Cape Town Tigers* (2–3)	FAP* (2–3)	Cobra Sport (1–4)	Espoir Fukash (1–4)
2023	Petro de Luanda* (5–0)	Al Ahly^ (4–1)	Ferroviário da Beira* (2–3)	Cape Town Tigers* (2–3)	SLAC (1–4)	City Oilers (1–4)
2024	Al Ahly* (5–1)	Al Ahly Ly^{+} (3–3)	Bangui SC (3–3)	City Oilers (1–5)	–	
2025	Al Ahli Tripoli* (6–0)	APR* (3–3)	MBB (3–3)	Nairobi City Thunder (1–5)	–	
