= Kalahari Conference =

Conference of the Basketball Africa League

- League: Basketball Africa League
- Sport: Basketball
- Founded: 2024
- First season: 2024
- No. of teams: 4
- Most recent champion: (Egypt) Al Ittihad Alexandria (1st title) (2025)

The Kalahari Conference is one of the three conferences that make up the Basketball Africa League (BAL), the other two being the Sahara Conference and the Nile Conference. All conferences currently consist of four teams.

The conference was introduced two years after the other two, in the 2024 BAL season.

== History ==
The creation of the Kalahari Conference as the league's third conference was announced on January 5, 2024. The inaugural conference phase was organised in the SunBet Arena in Pretoria, South Africa.

== Current standings ==
Pos	Team	Pld	W	L	PF	PA	PD	PCT	Qualification
1	(Egypt) Al Ittihad Alexandria	6	6	0	526	428	+98	1.000	Advance to playoffs
2	(Nigeria) Rivers Hoopers	6	4	2	484	466	+18	.667	Advance to playoffs
3	(Morocco) FUS Rabat (H)	6	2	4	456	475	−19	.333	Advance to playoffs
4	(Mali) Stade Malien	6	0	6	395	492	−97	.000	

Source: BAL
Rules for classification: Tiebreakers
(H) Hosts

== Conference winners ==
Although no official trophy or title is awarded, the team ending at the top of the standings in the conference is lauded as "Conference winners" by the BAL.

Kalahari Conference results
Season	Winners	Conference record	Playoffs result	Ref.
2024 (Details)	(Morocco) FUS Rabat (MAR)	3–1 (.750)	Quarterfinalists	
2025 (Details)	(Egypt) Al Ittihad Alexandria (EGY)	6–0 (1.000)	Fourth place	

== Standings ==
^	Denotes team that won the BAL championship
^{+}	Denotes team that lost in the BAL finals
*	Denotes team that qualified for the BAL playoffs
#	Denotes team that was disqualified

Season	Positions (by team)			
Season	1st	2nd	3rd	4th
2024	FUS Rabat* (3–1)	Petro de Luanda^{^} (2–2)	Cape Town Tigers (1–3)	Dynamo# (Disqualified)
2025	Al Ittihad Alexandria* (6–0)	Rivers Hoopers* (4–2)	FUS Rabat* (2–4)	Stade Malien (0–6)
