= 2024 BAL season =

4th season of the Basketball Africa League

- League: Basketball Africa League
- Season: 2024
- Dates: 9 March – 1 June 2024 (Note: The qualification rounds began on 3 October 2023 and ended 20 November 2023.)
- Number of games: 48
- Teams: 12

Playoffs
- Champions: (Angola) Petro de Luanda (1st title)
- Runners-up: (Libya) Al Ahly Ly
- Third place: (Nigeria) Rivers Hoopers
- Fourth place: (South Africa) Cape Town Tigers

Awards
- MVP: Jo Lual-Acuil (Al Ahly Ly)

Seasons
- ← 2023 (Season 3) 2025 (Season 5) →

The 2024 BAL season, also known as BAL Season 4, was the 4th season of the Basketball Africa League (BAL). The season began on 9 March 2024 and ended with the final on 1 June 2024, which was played in the BK Arena in Kigali, Rwanda for a fourth consecutive season.

This season the league was expanded to 48 games, and from two conferences to three conferences, as South Africa hosted the inaugural Kalahari Conference.

Al Ahly were the defending champions, having won the previous edition, but were eliminated in the quarterfinals by Al Ahly Ly. Petro de Luanda from Angola won their first BAL championship after defeating Al Ahly Ly from Libya in the final. As winners, Petro de Luanda, earned the right to play in the 2024 FIBA Intercontinental Cup.

== Venues ==
On 19 June 2023, the BAL and the Rwanda Development Board (RDB) announced they agreed on a multi-year extension to their collaboration. Under the extension, it was agreed that the BK Arena in Kigali was to host the playoffs and finals in the 2024, 2026 and 2028 seasons.

On 5 January 2024, the host venues and schedule were announced. The SunBet Arena in Pretoria, South Africa, was the fourth arena to host BAL games.

== Format changes ==
The BAL expanded the total games in the season from 38 to 48. In the group phase, there were three conferences as the Kalahari Conference was added to the already existing Nile Conference and Sahara Conference. The number of teams in the conferences was decreased to four, with all teams playing each other twice. The top two teams and the two best third-placed teams advanced to the playoffs. Before the playoffs, the eight teams played seeding teams to determine their opponents in the single-elimination playoffs. This was the second time the match-ups in the playoffs were determined by seeding, with teams ranked 1 to 8, as this was last done in the inaugural season.

== Qualification ==
=== Qualified teams ===
The six directly qualified teams were the champions of the national leagues of six pre-selected countries. The other six team qualified through the Road to BAL.

Directly Qualified (6)

- (Egypt) Al Ahly
- (Angola) Petro de Luanda
- (Tunisia) US Monastir
- (Rwanda) APR
- (Senegal) AS Douanes
- (Nigeria) Rivers Hoopers

Road to BAL (6)

- (Central African Republic) Bangui Sporting Club
- (Morocco) FUS Rabat
- (Libya) Al Ahly Benghazi
- (Uganda) City Oilers
- (South Africa) Cape Town Tigers
- (Burundi) Dynamo

=== Road to BAL ===
The Road to BAL began on 3 October and ended on 26 November 2023. On 21 September 2023, FIBA announced the 20 teams that had registered to play in the first round, which was played in five groups. The final phase of the West Division was organised in Yaoundé, Cameroon, for a third time. Johannesburg, South Africa, hosted the East Division finals once again.

Chad was represented for the first time in tournament history, by Lamantins, however, the team forfeited during halftime of their first game.

== Teams ==
Location of teams of the 2024 BAL season main tournament.
Green: Nile Conference; Yellow: Sahara Conference; Red: Kalahari Conference.

Petro de Luanda were the first team to qualify, as they won the 2022–23 Angolan Basketball League on 19 April 2023.

APR, Al Ahly Ly, Bangui Sporting Club, Dynamo and FUS Rabat made their league debuts. Al Ahly Ly, Bangui Sporting Club and Dynamo were the first teams from Libya, the Central African Republic, and Burundi, respectively, to play in the BAL.

Team	Method of qualification	Date of qualification	BAL appearance	Previous appearance	Consecutive appearances	Previous best performance	Ref.
(Angola) Petro de Luanda	2022–23 Angolan League champions	19 April 2023	4th	2023	4	Runners-up (2022)	
(Egypt) Al Ahly	2022–23 Egyptian Premier League champions	15 May 2023	2nd	2023	2	Champions (2023)	
(Tunisia) US Monastir	2022–23 Championnat Pro A champions	27 May 2023	4th	2023	4	Champions (2022)	
(Rwanda) APR	2023 RBL season champions	9 September 2023	1st	—	1	—	
(Senegal) AS Douanes	2023 Nationale 1 champions	17 September 2023	3rd	2023	2	Runners-up (2023)	
(Central African Republic) Bangui Sporting Club	Road to BAL West Division champions	4 November 2023	1st	—	1	—	
(Morocco) FUS Rabat	Road to BAL West Division runners-up	4 November 2023	1st	—	1	—	
(Libya) Al Ahly Ly (Note: During the 2024 BAL qualification, Al Ahly Ly was officially represented as Al Ahly Benghazi by FIBA.)	Road to BAL West Division third place	5 November 2023	1st	—	1	—	
(Uganda) City Oilers	Road to BAL East Division runners-up	25 November 2023	2nd	2023	2	Group phase (2023)	
(South Africa) Cape Town Tigers	Road to BAL East Division champions	25 November 2023	3rd	2023	3	Quarterfinals (2022, 2023)	
(Nigeria) Rivers Hoopers	2023 NBBF Premier League champions	25 November 2023	2nd	2021	1	Group phase (2021)	
(Burundi) Dynamo	Road to BAL East Division third place	26 November 2023	1st	—	1	—	

=== Personnel ===
Team	Head coach	Captain
Al Ahly	(Spain) Augustí Julbe	(Egypt) Seif Samir
Al Ahly Ly	(Serbia) Ivan Jeremić	(Libya) Sofian Hamad
APR	(Jordan) Maz Trakh	(Rwanda) Jean Jacques Nshobozwa
AS Douanes	(Senegal) Pabi Guèye	(Senegal) Alkaly Ndour
Bangui Sporting Club	(Cameroon) François Enyengue	(Central African Republic) Jimmy Djimrabaye
Cape Town Tigers	(South Africa) Mlungisi Ngwenya	(South Africa) Lebesa Selepe
City Oilers	(Morocco) Nesba Karim	(Uganda) James Okello
Dynamo	(France) Julien Chaignot	(United States) Bryton Hobbs
FUS Rabat	(Morocco) Said El Bouzidi	(Morocco) Abdelhakim Zouita
Petro de Luanda	(Brazil) José Neto (Conference Stage) (Note: José Neto coached Petro de Luanda during the Kalahari Conference, but was fired on 21 March 2024. Sergio Valdeolmillos was signed as his successor at 28 March 2024.)	(Angola) Carlos Morais
Petro de Luanda	(Spain) Sergio Valdeolmillos (Playoffs)	(Angola) Carlos Morais
Rivers Hoopers	(Nigeria) Ogoh Odaudu	(Nigeria) Victor Anthony Koko
US Monastir	(Egypt) Mohamed El Kardani	(Tunisia) Mokhtar Ghyaza

=== Foreign and Elevate players ===
Each BAL team was allowed to have four foreign players on its roster, including only two non-African players. Players in italics were signed only for the playoffs. If players have multiple nationalities, the nationality of an African nation is shown.

Each team had one player from the NBA Academy Africa, under the "BAL Elevate" program. This year the league allocated the players to teams, a switch from the draft system used in the previous seasons. Players were allocated based on the following criteria, in order: "country of birth, country of nationality, country where majority of life was spent, past BAL team, country of past BAL team."

Team	Players					Elevate player
Team	1	2	3	4	5	Elevate player
Al Ahly	(Ghana) Prince Ali	(Libya) Tony Mitchell	(United States) Mark Lyons			(Egypt) Seifeldin Hendawy
Al Ahly Ly	(South Sudan) Jo Lual-Acuil	(United States) Pierre Jackson^	(United States) Kevin Murphy	(South Sudan) Majok Deng	(Ivory Coast) Solo Diabate	(Senegal) Assane Mandian
APR	(United States) Dario Hunt	(Guyana) Obadiah Noel	(Egypt) Abdullah Ahmed	(Kenya) Tom Wamukota		(Senegal) Mouhamed Camara (Note: Ulrich Chomche was initially drafted by APR, however, he was left off the roster as he prepared for the 2024 NBA draft. He was replaced by Mouhamed Camara.)
AS Douanes	(Niger) Abdoulaye Harouna	(Ivory Coast) Mike Fofana	(Nigeria) Chris Obekpa	(Nigeria) Ifeanyichukwu Ochereobia	(South Sudan) Madut Akec	(Senegal) Khadim Mboup
Bangui Sporting Club	(Democratic Republic of the Congo) Rolly Fula Nganga	(United States) Curtis Hollis	(South Sudan) Moses Bol	(Nigeria) Emeka Nwabuzor	(South Sudan) Nyang Wek	(Egypt) Ahmed Abouelela
Cape Town Tigers	(Mali) Cartier Diarra	(United States) Billy Preston	(South Sudan) Ngor Manyang	(Senegal) Mouhamadou Ndoye	(South Sudan) Dhieu Deing*	(Senegal) Yakhya Diop
City Oilers	(United States) Patrick Rembert	(United States) Dane Miller Jr.	(United States) Randy Culpepper	(Ghana) Bashir Ahmed		(South Sudan) Khaman Maluach
Dynamo	(South Sudan) Dhieu Deing	(United Kingdom) Morakinyo Williams	(United States) Bryton Hobbs	(Senegal) Makhtar Gueye	(Nigeria) Israel Otobo	(Senegal) Mohamed Camara
FUS Rabat	(Mali) Aliou Diarra	(United States) Ken Brown	(United States) John Jordan	(Belgium) Ayoub Nouhi	(Belgium) Yacine Baeri	(Ivory Coast) Mohamed Sylla
Petro de Luanda	(United States) Markeith Cummings	(United States) Anthony Nelson^	(United States) Nick Faust			(Angola) Aginaldo Neto
Rivers Hoopers	(United States) Will Perry	(Morocco) John Wilkins				(Nigeria) David Ugonna
US Monastir	(South Sudan) Ater Majok	(Mali) Sadio Doucouré	(United States) Chris Crawford	(United States) George Williams	(United States) Avry Holmes*	(Tunisia) Ahmed Bedoui

Notes:
* Playoffs only.
^ Player left the team after the conference phase.

== Pre-season ==
For a second consecutive season, the BAL champions directly qualified for the FIBA Intercontinental Cup. At the 2023 Singapore edition, Al Ahly represented the league. Al Ahly finished in the fourth place, after previously beating the NBA G League Ignite to become the first African team to win a game in the competition's history.

The league hosted the third BAL Combine at the Ibn Yassine Omnisports Hall in Rabat, Morocco, between 5 January and 7 January 2024. It was the first combine to be held on the African continent, after the previous editions were hosted in Paris and New York. A total of 30 players participated under combine director Robert Pack.

== Schedule ==
The schedule for the 2024 season was officially released on 5 January 2024.

Phase	Round	Draw date	Games
Qualifying rounds (Road to BAL)	First Round	–	3 – 23 October 2023
Qualifying rounds (Road to BAL)	Elite 16	23 October 2023	31 October – 26 November 2023
Regular season	Kalahari Conference	–	9 – 17 March 2024
Regular season	Nile Conference	–	19 – 27 April 2024
Regular season	Sahara Conference	–	4 – 12 May 2024
Seeding games		–	24 May – 1 June 2024
Playoffs	Quarter-finals	–	24 May – 1 June 2024
Playoffs	Semi-finals	–	24 May – 1 June 2024
Playoffs	Final and third place	–	24 May – 1 June 2024

== Conference phase ==
The conference phase was played between 9 March and 12 May 2024. The 12 teams of the conference phase were divided into three conferences. In addition to the Sahara Conference and Nile Conference, the inaugural Kalahari Conference took place.

=== Tiebreakers ===
The ranking of teams in the regular season was determined as follows:

1. Win-loss record;
2. Head-to-head record;
3. Point differential in the games between the respective teams;
4. Number of points scored in the games between the respective teams;
5. Average point differential in all games against other teams in the Conference;
6. Average number of points scored in all games played against other teams in the Conference;
7. Drawing.

=== Kalahari Conference ===
The Kalahari Conference games began on 9 March and ended on 17 March 2024 and were played at the SunBet Arena in Pretoria, South Africa. In the opening day game between Burundi's Dynamo and South Africa's Cape Town Tigers, the Burundian side taped off the logo of league sponsor Visit Rwanda. Political tensions between the two border nations Burundi and Rwanda had been rising, as Burundi has accused Rwanda of supporting the RED-Tabara rebel militia in the country. Dynamo forfeited their second game against FUS Rabat on 10 March, with the BAL citing "refusing to comply with the league’s rules governing jersey and uniform requirements" as the reason why. Following Dynamo's second forfeit on 12 March, the team was automatically withdrawn from the group as per FIBA rules. Dynamo players Bryton Hobbs and Makhtar Gueye stated that the Burundian government had prohibited the team to wear the logo and ordered the club to forfeit its games if necessary.

Pos	Team	Pld	W	L	PF	PA	PD	PCT	Qualification	FUS	PDL	CTT	DBC
1	(Morocco) FUS Rabat	4	3	1	363	295	+68	.750	Advance to playoffs	—	86–89	84–78	~~20–0~~
2	(Angola) Petro de Luanda	4	2	2	360	340	+20	.500	Advance to playoffs	73–82	—	100–88	Canc.
3	(South Africa) Cape Town Tigers (H)	4	1	3	305	346	−41	.250	Advance to playoffs	58–84	84–78	—	~~73–86~~
4	(Burundi) Dynamo (D)	0	0	0	0	0	0	—	Withdrew	Canc.	Canc.	Canc.	—

Source: BAL
Legend: Blue = home team win; Red = away team win.
Rules for classification: Tiebreakers
(D) Disqualified; (H) Hosts

=== Nile Conference ===
Defending champions Al Ahly captured its first Nile Conference title, despite surprisingly losing one game to lower-ranked City Oilers. Al Ahly Ly edged out Bangui SC for the second place, winning the tiebreaker on head-to-head performance. City Oilers center Khaman Maluach, only 17 at the time, impressed by leading the league and blocks.

Pos	Team	Pld	W	L	PF	PA	PD	PCT	Qualification	ASC	AAL	BSC	COB
1	(Egypt) Al Ahly (H)	6	5	1	544	470	+74	.833	Advance to playoffs	—	98–88	94–71	99–76
2	(Libya) Al Ahly Ly	6	3	3	537	498	+39	.500 (Note: Head-to-head: Al Ahly Ly and Bangui SC were tied 1–1 in their games, +19 point differential for Al Ahly Ly over these two games.)	Advance to playoffs	76–87	—	93–71	110–78
3	(Central African Republic) Bangui SC	6	3	3	509	529	−20	.500		79–85	96–93	—	101–88
4	(Uganda) City Oilers	6	1	5	468	561	−93	.167		82–81	68–79	76–91	—

Source: BAL
Legend: Blue = home team win; Red = away team win.
Rules for classification: Tiebreakers
(H) Hosts

=== Sahara Conference ===
The Rivers Hoopers clinched the Sahara Conference title and qualified for their first playoff appearance, after having missed out in 2021. AS Douanes took the second place, while US Monastir advanced as one of the best-ranked third place teams. APR was eliminated after a loss to Douanes on the final gameday, becoming the first Rwandan team to fail to qualify for the playoffs.

Pos	Team	Pld	W	L	PF	PA	PD	PCT	Qualification	RIV	ASD	USM	APR
1	(Nigeria) Rivers Hoopers	6	4	2	441	413	+28	.667	Advance to playoffs	—	54–56	62–73	78–71
2	(Senegal) AS Douanes (H)	6	3	3	409	385	+24	.500 (Note: Head-to-head: AS Douanes 1–1 US Monastir, AS Douanes won on aggregrate point difference (+1).)	Advance to playoffs	68–77	—	76–59	79–54
3	(Tunisia) US Monastir	6	3	3	437	450	−13	.500	Advance to playoffs	63–84	75–69	—	84–89
4	(Rwanda) APR	6	2	4	432	471	−39	.333		82–86	66–61	70–83	—

Source: BAL
Legend: Blue = home team win; Red = away team win.
Rules for classification: Tiebreakers
(H) Hosts

=== Ranking of third-placed teams ===
Pos	Grp	Team	Pld	W	L	PF	PA	PD	PCT	Qualification
1	Sahara	(Tunisia) US Monastir	4	2	2	270	287	−17	.500	Advance to playoffs
2	Kalahari	(South Africa) Cape Town Tigers	4	1	3	305	346	−41	.250 (Note: Cape Town Tigers won the tie-breaker over Bangui SC based on point differential.)	Advance to playoffs
3	Nile	(Central African Republic) Bangui SC	4	1	3	317	365	−48	.250	

Source: BAL

== Playoffs ==
The playoffs and finals were held from 24 May to 1 June 2024 in the BK Arena in Kigali, Rwanda. This was the first year in which seeding games are part of the playoffs.

Three out of four quarterfinal games were won by the lower seeded team. Petro de Luanda became the first team to reach four consecutive semi-finals, while the Al Ahly Ly, the Cape Town Tigers and the Rivers Hoopers made their semi-final debuts and became the first teams from Libya, South Africa and Nigeria, respectively, to qualify for the stage.

=== Rankings ===
Pos	Team	Pld	W	L	GF	GA	GD	PCT	Qualification
1	(Egypt) Al Ahly	4	4	0	363	313	+50	1.000	Qualification to 1st-2nd seed game
2	(Morocco) FUS Rabat	4	3	1	363	295	+68	.750	Qualification to 1st-2nd seed game
3	(Nigeria) Rivers Hoopers	4	2	2	277	260	+17	.500	Qualification to 3rd-4th seed game
4	(Senegal) AS Douanes	4	2	2	269	265	+4	.500	Qualification to 3rd-4th seed game
5	(Angola) Petro de Luanda	4	2	2	360	340	+20	.500	Qualification to 5th-6th seed game
6	(Tunisia) US Monastir	4	2	2	270	291	−21	.500	Qualification to 5th-6th seed game
7	(Libya) Al Ahly Ly	4	1	3	348	352	−4	.250	Qualification to 7th-8th seed game
8	(South Africa) Cape Town Tigers	4	1	3	305	346	−41	.250	Qualification to 7th-8th seed game

Source: BAL
Rules for classification: Teams ranked on 1) Win-loss record; 2) Head-to-head record; 3) Point differential in the games between the respective teams; 4) Number of points scored in the games between the respective teams; 5) Average point differential in all games against other teams in the Conference; 6) Average number of points scored in all games played against other teams in the Conference; 7) Drawing.

=== Seeding games ===
The seeding games between the eight teams that advanced from the group phase were played on 24 and 25 May. The match-ups were determined based on an aggregate ranking of all teams, with four pairings to decide the final seeds.

Team 1	Score	Team 2
Al Ahly (Egypt)	78–89	(Morocco) FUS Rabat
Rivers Hoopers (Nigeria)	57–63	(Senegal) AS Douanes
Petro de Luanda (Angola)	67–70	(Tunisia) US Monastir
Al Ahly Ly (Libya)	87–67	(South Africa) Cape Town Tigers

=== Bracket ===
Quarterfinals
1	(Morocco) FUS Rabat	88
8	(South Africa) Cape Town Tigers (OT)	91
3	(Senegal) AS Douanes	65
6	(Angola) Petro de Luanda	66
2	(Egypt) Al Ahly	77
7	(Libya) Al Ahly Ly	86
4	(Nigeria) Rivers Hoopers	92
5	(Tunisia) US Monastir	88

Semifinals
8	(South Africa) Cape Town Tigers	86
6	(Angola) Petro de Luanda (OT)	96
7	(Libya) Al Ahly Ly (OT)	89
4	(Nigeria) Rivers Hoopers	83

Final
6	(Angola) Petro de Luanda	107
7	(Libya) Al Ahly Ly	94
Third place game
4	(Nigeria) Rivers Hoopers	80
8	(South Africa) Cape Town Tigers	57

== Individual awards ==
The winner of the Coach of the Year award was announced before the third-place game on 31 May. Following the final on 1 June, the remaining awards were announced. Jo Lual-Acuil became the first player to win both the MVP and Defensive Player of the Year awards, as well as the first player on a losing team to be named MVP.

- Most Valuable Player: Jo Lual-Acuil, Al Ahly Ly
- Defensive Player of the Year: Jo Lual-Acuil, Al Ahly Ly
- Coach of the Year: Ogoh Odaudu, Rivers Hoopers
- Sportsmanship Award: Will Perry, Rivers Hoopers
- Ubuntu Award: Alkaly Ndour, AS Douanes

- All-BAL First Team
  - G Chris Crawford, US Monastir
  - G Will Perry, Rivers Hoopers
  - F Samkelo Cele, Cape Town Tigers
  - C Jo Lual-Acuil, Al Ahly Ly
  - C Aliou Diarra, FUS Rabat
- All-BAL Second Team
  - G Abdoulaye Harouna, AS Douanes
  - G Ehab Amin, Al Ahly
  - G Kelvin Amayo, Rivers Hoopers
  - F Devine Eke, Rivers Hoopers
  - C Majok Deng, Al Ahly Ly

- BAL All-Defensive First Team
  - G Solo Diabate, Al Ahly Ly
  - G Abdoulaye Harouna, AS Douanes
  - F Samkelo Cele, Cape Town Tigers
  - C Aliou Diarra, FUS Rabat
  - C Jo Lual-Acuil, Al Ahly Ly
- BAL All-Defensive Second Team
  - G Childe Dundão, Petro de Luanda
  - G Jean Jacques Boissy, AS Douanes
  - G Kelvin Amayo, Rivers Hoopers
  - F Devine Eke, Rivers Hoopers
  - C Ater Majok, US Monastir

== Statistics ==
=== Individual statistic leaders ===
Category	Player	Team(s)	Statistic
Points per game	Jo Lual-Acuil	Al Ahly Ly	21.1
Rebounds per game	Khaman Maluach	City Oilers	13.5
Assists per game	Chris Crawford	US Monastir	9.0
Steals per game	Abdoulaye Harouna	AS Douanes	4.0
Blocks per game	Abdou Ndoye	Cape Town Tigers	3.5
Minutes per game	Rolly Fula Nganga	Bangui SC	37.7
FG%	Aliou Diarra	FUS Rabat	66.7%
3P%	Billy Preston	Cape Town Tigers	50.0%
FT%	Will Perry	Rivers Hoopers	91.9%

=== Individual game highs ===
The league's all-time records for points, rebounds, steals and blocks in a single game were all broken this year.

Category	Player	Team	Statistic
Points	Jo Lual-Acuil	Al Ahly Ly	42 (record)
Rebounds	Nkosinathi Sibanyoni	Cape Town Tigers	25 (record)
Assists	Chris Crawford	US Monastir	14
Steals	Mark Lyons	Al Ahly	8 (record)
Blocks	Khaman Maluach	City Oilers	7 (record)
Three pointers	Abdoulaye Harouna	AS Douanes	8

=== Team statistic leaders ===
Category	Team	Statistic
Points per game	Al Ahly Ly	89.3
Rebounds per game	Rivers Hoopers	49.7
Assists per game	Dynamo	21.0
Steals per game	Dynamo	12.0
Blocks per game	FUS Rabat	5.5
Turnovers per game	FUS Rabat	16.5
Turnovers per game	APR	16.5
Fouls per game	Petro de Luanda	20.6
FG%	Dynamo	52.2%
FT%	US Monastir	73.0%
3P%	Al Ahly Ly	36.6%
