= 2024 BAL Nile Conference =

2024 Nile Conference
Tournament details
- Country: Egypt
- City: 6th of October, Cairo
- Venue(s): Hassan Moustafa Sports Hall
- Dates: 19 – 27 April 2024
- Teams: 4

Final positions
- Champions: (Egypt) Al Ahly (1st title)

The 2024 BAL Nile Conference was the 3rd season of the Nile Conference, one of the three conferences of the 2024 season of the Basketball Africa League (BAL). The composition of the conference and the schedule were announced on 15 February 2024. The conference games began on 19 April and ended on 27 April 2024.

Al Ahly won the conference with a 5–1 record, and Al Ahly Ly qualified for the playoffs as second ranked team.

== Standings ==
Pos	Team	Pld	W	L	GF	GA	GD	PCT	Qualification
1	(Egypt) Al Ahly (H)	6	5	1	544	470	+74	.833	Advance to playoffs
2	(Libya) Al Ahly Ly	6	3	3	537	498	+39	.500 (Note: Head-to-head: Al Ahly Ly and Bangui SC were tied 1–1 in their games, +19 point differential for Al Ahly Ly over these two games.)	Advance to playoffs
3	(Central African Republic) Bangui SC	6	3	3	509	529	−20	.500	
4	(Uganda) City Oilers	6	1	5	468	561	−93	.167	

Source: BAL
Rules for classification: Tiebreakers
(H) Hosts

== Games ==
=== Gameday 1 ===
The two sides had met each other in the 2024 BAL qualification, where Bangui defeated Al Ahly 87–85 in the semifinal to qualify for the BAL season.

Bangui opened the first quarter strong and scored its first nine points from behind the three-point line, and went up 29–26 after the first quarter. In the second, Al Ahly Ly went on a 15–0 run and never trailed again in the game. Their backcourt duo of Kevin Murphy and Pierre Jackson combined for 41 points.

19 April 2024
4:00 PM

Livestats

Al Ahly Ly (Libya)	93–71	(Central African Republic) Bangui SC
Scoring by quarter: 23–29, 31–13, 18–16, 21–13
Pts: Murphy 21; Rebs: Deng 8 Asts: Jackson 11		Pts: Fula Nganga 19; Rebs: Nwabuzor 9 Asts: Nwabuzor 4

Hassan Moustafa Sports Hall, 6th of October
Attendance: 975
Referees: Kaz Beverly, Sara Elsharnouby, Claudio Eiuba

Al Ahly and City Oilers played their second BAL game, after Al Ahly had won in the previous season's Nile Conference. In the second quarter, Al Ahly used a 19–0 run to take the lead and never trailed again the comprehensive win. Ehab Amin led his team with 16 points, 4 rebounds and 5 assists, while Mark Lyons contributed 14 points for the Egyptians. Patrick Rembert scored 21 points for the Oilers while BAL Elevate youngster Khaman Maluach recorded 16 points and 8 rebounds off the bench for the Oilers.

19 April 2024
7:00 PM

Livestats

Al Ahly (Egypt)	99–76	(Uganda) City Oilers
Scoring by quarter: 28–16, 25–19, 26–21, 20–20
Pts: Amin 16; Rebs: Mitchell 8 Asts: Amin, Elgizawy 5		Pts: Rembert 21; Rebs: Maluach 8 Asts: Rembert 6

Hassan Moustafa Sports Hall, 6th of October
Attendance: 2,027
Referees: Kladji Mulla, Mbaye Seye, Silver Houngbedji

=== Gameday 2 ===
In their second game, Thierry Darlan led Bangui SC to record their first ever win in the BAL. Rolly Fula Nganga and Evans Ganapamo added City Oilers center Khaman Maluach set new career-highs of 29 points and 11 rebounds and got his first BAL double-double at 17 years old.

20 April 2024
4:00 PM

Livestats

Bangui SC (Central African Republic)	101–88	(Uganda) City Oilers
Scoring by quarter: 23–26, 27–17, 25–27, 26–18
Pts: Darlan 22; Rebs: Darlan 10; Asts: Nwabuzor 10		Pts: Maluach 29; Rebs: Maluach 11; Asts: Culpepper, Rembert 5

Hassan Moustafa Sports Hall, 6th of October
Attendance: 543
Referees: Kelsey Reynolds, Annie Joyce Muchenu, Oumar Sy

20 April 2024
7:00 PM

Livestats

Al Ahly (Egypt)	98–88	(Libya) Al Ahly Ly
Scoring by quarter: 20–21, 22–18, 27–19, 29–28
Pts: Lyons 20; Rebs: Three players 6 Asts: Gendy 5		Pts: Jackson 26; Rebs: Lual-Acuil 9 Asts: Diabate, Jackson 5

Hassan Moustafa Sports Hall, 6th of October
Attendance: 2,115
Referees: Kenneth Gardner, Jean Sauveur Ruhamiriza, Amir Taboubi

=== Gameday 3 ===
22 April 2024
4:00 PM

Livestats

City Oilers (Uganda)	68–79	(Libya) Al Ahly Ly
Scoring by quarter: 11–25, 13–25, 24–11, 20–18
Pts: Rembert 17; Rebs: Maluach 19; Asts: Baale, Rembert 2		Pts: Lual-Acuil 22; Rebs: Diabate 9 Asts: Diabate 11

Hassan Moustafa Sports Hall, 6th of October
Attendance: 450
Referees: Kladji Mulla, Amir Taboubi, Oumar Sy

With 4:45 to go in the game, Bangui SC took the lead following a three-pointer by Thierry Darlan. Al Ahly then used a 8–0 lead to win the game.

22 April 2024
7:00 PM

Livestats

Bangui SC (Central African Republic)	79–85	(Egypt) Al Ahly
Scoring by quarter: 18–21, 20–22, 19–20, 22–22
Pts: Fula Nganga 27; Rebs: Darlan 14; Asts: Darlan, Nwabuzor 3		Pts: Three players 14; Rebs: Mitchell 7 Asts: Lyons, Mitchell 3

Hassan Moustafa Sports Hall, 6th of October
Attendance: 1,895
Referees: Kaz Beverly, Jean Sauveur Ruhamiriza, Annie Joyce Muchenu

=== Gameday 4 ===
24 April 2024
4:00 PM

Livestats

Bangui SC (Central African Republic)	96–93	(Libya) Al Ahly Ly
Scoring by quarter: 15–16, 32–29, 24–12, 25–34
Pts: Fula Nganga 30; Rebs: Darlan 14; Asts: Wegscheider 6		Pts: Lual-Acuil 22; Rebs: Lual-Acuil 10; Asts: Diabate, Jackson 5

Hassan Moustafa Sports Hall, 6th of October
Attendance: 453
Referees: Kelsey Reynolds, Mbaye Seye, Sara Elsharnouby

24 April 2024
7:00 PM

Livestats

City Oilers (Uganda)	82–81	(Egypt) Al Ahly
Scoring by quarter: 23–21, 15–14, 18–19, 26–17
Pts: Maluach 27; Rebs: Maluach 16; Asts: Miller Jr. 4		Pts: Gardner 19; Rebs: Amin, Gardner 8 Asts: Lyons, Mitchell 4

Hassan Moustafa Sports Hall, 6th of October
Attendance: 2,589
Referees: Kenneth Gardner, Claudio Eiuba, Silver Hongbedji

=== Gameday 5 ===
26 April 2024
4:00 PM

Livestats

City Oilers (Uganda)	76–91	(Central African Republic) Bangui SC
Scoring by quarter: 12–19, 22–27, 27–18, 15–17
Pts: Rembert 21; Rebs: Maluach 13; Asts: Culpepper 6		Pts: Ngaïfei 22; Rebs: Ngaïfei 11; Asts: Darlan 7

Hassan Moustafa Sports Hall, 6th of October
Attendance: 678
Referees: Kaz Beverly, Sara Elsharnouby, Oumar Sy

26 April 2024
7:00 PM

Livestats

Al Ahly Ly (Libya)	76–87	(Egypt) Al Ahly
Scoring by quarter: 21–25, 24–17, 18–27, 13–18
Pts: Lual-Acuil 26; Rebs: Lual-Acuil 15; Asts: Jackson 10		Pts: Mitchell 16; Rebs: Amin, Oraby 9 Asts: Lyons 7

Hassan Moustafa Sports Hall, 6th of October
Attendance: Kladji Mulla, Mbaye Seye, Amir Taboubi
Referees: 2,730

=== Gameday 6 ===
Going into the last gameday, Bangui SC could win the conference following a win over Al Ahly and City Oilers could theoretically qualify for the third place. In the win that clinched Al Ahly Ly's playoff spot, Jo Lual-Acuil set a new BAL record for most points in a single game with 42 points.

27 April 2024
4:00 PM

Livestats

Al Ahly Ly (Libya)	110–78	(Uganda) City Oilers
Scoring by quarter: 20–22, 32–20, 23–24, 35–12
Pts: Lual-Acuil 42; Rebs: Lual-Acuil 13; Asts: Diabate 8		Pts: Ahmed, Culpepper 14; Rebs: Maluach 13; Asts: Miller Jr. 10

Hassan Moustafa Sports Hall, 6th of October
Attendance: 435
Referees: Kenneth Gardner, Annie Joyce Muchenu, Claudio Eiuba

Following their convincing win over Bangui SC, Al Ahly won their first conference title. Because of the result, Kalahari Conference team Cape Town Tigers qualified for the playoffs as one of the two best third-placed teams, while Bangui had to wait for the results of the Sahara Conference.

27 April 2024
7:00 PM

Livestats

Al Ahly (Egypt)	94–71	(Central African Republic) Bangui SC
Scoring by quarter: 28–15, 25–17, 21–21, 20–18
Pts: Ali 13; Rebs: Gardner 7 Asts: Three players 6		Pts: Wegscheider 16; Rebs: Djimbaraye 11; Asts: Wegscheider 4

Hassan Moustafa Sports Hall, 6th of October
Attendance: 3,003
Referees: Kelsey Reynolds, Jean Sauveur Ruhamiriza, Silver Houngbedji

== Statistics ==
Category	Player	Team(s)	Statistic
Points per game	Jo Lual-Acuil	Al Ahly Ly	23.0
Rebounds per game	Khaman Maluach	City Oilers	13.5
Assists per game	Solo Diabate	Al Ahly Ly	7.0
Steals per game	Solo Diabate	Al Ahly Ly	2.3
Blocks per game	Khaman Maluach	City Oilers	2.8
