= Aginaldo Neto =

Angolan basketball player (born 2006)

No. 1 – Boise State Broncos
- Position: Point guard

Personal information
- Born: April 29, 2006 (age 20)
- Listed height: 1.90 m (6 ft 3 in)
- Listed weight: 180 lb (82 kg)

Career information
- High school: NBA Academy Africa (Saly, Senegal) Bella Vista College Prep (Phoenix, Arizona)
- College: Boise State (2025–present)
- Playing career: 2024–present

Career history
- 2024: Petro de Luanda

Career highlights
- BAL champion (2024)

Aginaldo Neto (born April 29, 2006) is an Angolan basketball player who plays for the Boise State Broncos and the Angola national team. He is a 1.90 m (6 ft 3 in) tall point guard.

== Early life and career ==
He started playing at age 10, switching from soccer to basketball. Neto eventually began his career with Clube desportivo cidade do Kilamba with a coach named Vladimiro Miranda who coached Neto for seven years they both went to Primeiro de Agosto, one of Angola's power house clubs. He won a national junior championship in 2019, Neto was named the MVP and the best scorer nationally accumulating 252 points in five games, with a game-high of 59 points. After, he joined the Angolan U-18 national team in 2022 with 16 years old. He then took his talents to the NBA Academy Africa, located in Senegal. Neto played with the NBA Academy in the Road to BAL in 2023 and 2024. He has drawn offers from colleges Nebraska and San Diego State and was called up for the 2024 Basketball Without Borders camp in Indianapolis, U.S.

== Professional career ==
Neto played with Petro de Luanda in the 2024 BAL season under the BAL Elevate program, which allocated NBA Academy players to BAL rosters, and won the championship with the team.

== College career ==
On June 4, 2025, Neto officially joined the Boise State Broncos starting from the 2025–26 season, refusing an offer by San Diego.

== National team career ==
Neto played with the Angola under-18 team at the 2022 FIBA U18 African Championship. Neto made his Angola senior national team debut on February 23, 2024, in a AfroBasket qualifier game against Guinea.
