= 2023–24 Bangui Sporting Club season =

Bangui Sporting Club
2023–24 season
- Head coach: Liz Mills (Qualifiers); François Enyengue (BAL)
- BAL: 3rd in Nile Conference
- Scoring leader: (Democratic Republic of the Congo) Rolly Fula Nganga 20.2
- Rebounding leader: (Central African Republic) Thierry Darlan 8.7
- Assists leader: (Nigeria) Michael Nwabuzor 4.8

The 2023-2024 season of Bangui Sporting Club marks the debut season of the team in the Basketball Africa League (BAL), following their successful qualification through the Road to BAL. Bangui SC becomes the first team from the Central African Republic to play in the competition.

== Overview ==
Bangui played in the Road to BAL following their 2023 Bangui Basketball League championship that was earned after beating New Tech Bantou in the finals. They were headed by Australian head coach Liz Mills in the qualification campaign. On November 4, 2023, Bangui clinched their spot in the 2024 BAL season. Bangui then wet on to win the West Division title after beating FUS Rabat.

Amidst financial issues and payment issues, coach Mills contract was not extended. On March 22, 2024, Justin Serresse was announced by the team as their new head coach. However, Serresse left the team over payment disputes and on the opening day on April 19, 2024, Cameroonian coach François Enyengue coached the team. Of the Road to BAL squad, four players remained (Evans Ganapamo, Rolly Fula Nganga, Jimmy Djimrabaye and Omega Ngaïfei) and eight new players were brought in.

Bangui finished third in the Nile Conference with a 3–3 record and had to wait for the Sahar Conference to finish to find out if it would qualify of the playoffs. On May 12, 2024, Bangui was officially eliminated after US Monastir and Cape Town Tigers qualified as best third-ranked teams.

== Rosters ==
=== Road to BAL roster ===
The following was Bangui's roster for the Elite 16 round of the 2024 BAL Qualification.

November 2024 Bangui Sporting Club roster
Players
Coaches

| Pos. | No. | Nat. | Name | Ht. | Age |
|---|---|---|---|---|---|
| F | 1 | (Central African Republic) | Ganapamo, Evans | 2.01 m (6 ft 7 in) | 32 – 19 August 1994 |
| F | 2 | (Central African Republic) | Kottaud, Jordao | 1.98 m (6 ft 6 in) | 32 – 8 January 1994 |
| PG | 4 | (United States) | Johnson, Bijan | 1.87 m (6 ft 2 in) | 30 – 23 February 1996 |
| PF | 7 | (Australia) | Higgins-Titsha, Alex | 2.01 m (6 ft 7 in) | 26 – 12 July 2000 |
| G | 8 | (Central African Republic) | Kamayengue, Yasser | 1.80 m (5 ft 11 in) | 21 – 16 April 2005 |
| SG | 10 | (Central African Republic) | Nambaï, Metson | 1.92 m (6 ft 4 in) | 31 – 27 February 1995 |
| F | 14 | (Central African Republic) | Dondon, Elisée | 1.90 m (6 ft 3 in) | 28 – 29 June 1998 |
| F | 15 | (Democratic Republic of the Congo) | Fula Nganga, Rolly | 2.01 m (6 ft 7 in) | 33 – 2 February 1993 |
| F | 22 | (Central African Republic) | Kouguère, Max | 1.99 m (6 ft 6 in) | 39 – 12 March 1987 |
| PF | 24 | (South Sudan) | Malou, Emmanuel | 2.03 m (6 ft 8 in) | 32 – 3 November 1993 |
| C | 35 | (Central African Republic) | Djimrabaye, Jimmy | 2.03 m (6 ft 8 in) | 34 – 8 April 1992 |
| PF | 84 | (Central African Republic) | Ngaïfei, Omega | 2.04 m (6 ft 8 in) | 25 – 14 May 2001 |

Head coach

- (Australia) Liz Mills

Assistant coach(es)

- (United States) Jeff Sparrow

Legend

- (C) Team captain
- Injured

- Roster
Updated: 4 November 2023

== Games ==
=== Road to BAL ===
==== First round ====
| 8 October 2023 | Espoir (Gabon) | 73–69 | (Central African Republic) Bangui Sporting Club | Yaoundé |
| 14:00 | Scoring by quarter: 25-11, 26-16, 10-16, 12-26 |
| | Pts: Essono Mvé 21; Rebs: Igouwe 8 Asts: Igouwe 4 | Report | Pts: Fula Nganga 18; Rebs: Higgins-Titsha, Kouguère 7 Asts: Johnson 7 | Arena: Yaoundé Multipurpose Sports Complex |

| 9 October 2023 | Lamatins | 0–20 | (Central African Republic) Bangui Sporting Club | Yaoundé |
| 14:00 |
| | | Report | | Arena: Yaoundé Multipurpose Sports Complex |

| 10 October 2023 | Bangui Sporting Club (Central African Republic) | 82–39 | (Democratic Republic of the Congo) Virunga | Yaoundé |
| 17:00 | Scoring by quarter: 20-8, 21-13, 14-12, 27-6 |
| | Pts: Ganapamo 20; Rebs: Ganapamo, Higgins-Titsha 10; Asts: Johnson 5 | Report | Pts: Monze Nzamba 13; Rebs: Bolangi Liseko 11; Asts: Four players 1 | Arena: Yaoundé Multipurpose Sports Complex; Referees: Hassane Kamate (CIV), Arnold Moseya (RSA), Emmanuel Kpawogbo (BEN) |

| 12 October 2023 | Bangui Sporting Club (Central African Republic) | 88–87 | (Cameroon) FAP | Yaoundé |
| 17:00 | Scoring by quarter: 23-19, 24-26, 11-28, 30-14 |
| | Pts: Johnson 20; Rebs: Higgins-Titsha 9 Asts: Djimrabaye 7 | Report | Pts: Kome 25; Rebs: Njiki 13; Asts: Three players 4 | Arena: Yaoundé Multipurpose Sports Complex; Referees: Arnold Moseya (RSA), Emmanuel Kpawogbo (BEN), Mohamed Yaya Cisse (GUI) |

==== Elite 16 ====
| 31 October 2023 | Bangui Sporting Club (Central African Republic) | 88–79 | (Guinea) SLAC | Yaoundé |
| 17:00 | Scoring by quarter: 29-20, 17-21, 17-22, 25-16 |
| | Pts: Ganapamo 25; Rebs: Djimrabaye 11; Asts: Johnson 11 | | Pts: Hearst 23; Rebs: Gilbert 12; Asts: Hearst 7 | Arena: Yaoundé Multipurpose Sports Complex; Referees: Sara Elsharnouby (EGY), Claudio Eiuba (ANG), Oumar Sy (MRI) |

| 1 November 2023 | FUS Rabat (Morocco) | 90–89(OT) | (Central African Republic) Bangui Sporting Club | Yaoundé |
| 17:00 | Scoring by quarter: 17-23, 21-19, 22-26, 22-14, Overtime: 8-7 |
| | Pts: Jordan 28; Rebs: Diarra 9 Asts: Jordan 6 | Report | Pts: Ganapamo 20; Rebs: Djimrabaye 11; Asts: Johnson 8 | Arena: Yaoundé Multipurpose Sports Complex; Referees: Walelign Gebeto (ETH), Emmanuel Kpawogbo (BEN), Papa Felix Seye (SEN) |

| 2 November 2023 | Bangui Sporting Club (Central African Republic) | 83–70 | (Ivory Coast) ABC Fighters | Yaoundé |
| 20:00 | Scoring by quarter: 24-19, 23-14, 10-20, 26-17 |
| | Pts: Kamayengue 24; Rebs: Kouguere 9 Asts: Three players 3 | Report | Pts: Edosomwan 15; Rebs: Edosomwan 14; Asts: Westbrook 3 | Arena: Yaoundé Multipurpose Sports Complex; Referees: Sara Elsharnouby (EGY), Claudio Eiuba (ANG), Adlen Larouci (ALG) |

===== Semifinal =====
| 4 November 2023 | Al Ahly Benghazi (Libya) | 85–87 | (Central African Republic) Bangui Sporting Club | Yaoundé |
| 17:00 | Scoring by quarter: 23-14, 29-32, 22-21, 11-20 |
| | Pts: Hamad 20; Rebs: Majok 12; Asts: Crawford 6 | Report | Pts: Ganapamo 22; Rebs: Kouguère 9 Asts: Johnson 5 | Arena: Yaoundé Multipurpose Sports Complex; Referees: Walelign Gebeto (ETH), Didier Gaga (RWA), Adlen Larouci (ALG) |

==== Final ====
| 5 November 2023 | Bangui Sporting Club (Central African Republic) | 92–90 | (Morocco) FUS Rabat | Yaoundé |
| 17:00 | Scoring by quarter: 21-20, 27-23, 21-24, 24-23 |
| | Pts: Kamayengue 17; Rebs: Djimrabaye 10; Asts: Johnson 7 | Report | Pts: Jordan 17; Rebs: Azouga 8 Asts: Jordan 8 | Arena: Yaoundé Multipurpose Sports Complex; Referees: Hassane Kamate (CIV), Claudio Eiuba (ANG), Emmanuel Kpawogbo (BEN) |

=== BAL ===
| Pos | Team | Pld | W | L | PF | PA | PD | PCT | Qualification |
|---|---|---|---|---|---|---|---|---|---|
| 1 | (Egypt) Al Ahly (H) | 6 | 5 | 1 | 544 | 470 | +74 | .833 | Advance to playoffs |
| 2 | (Libya) Al Ahly Ly | 6 | 3 | 3 | 537 | 498 | +39 | .500 (Note: Head-to-head: Al Ahly Ly and Bangui SC were tied 1–1 in their games, +19 point differential for Al Ahly Ly over these two games.) | Advance to playoffs |
| 3 | (Central African Republic) Bangui SC | 6 | 3 | 3 | 509 | 529 | −20 | .500 | |
| 4 | (Uganda) City Oilers | 6 | 1 | 5 | 468 | 561 | −93 | .167 | |

Source: BAL
Rules for classification: Tiebreakers
(H) Hosts

==== Nile Conference ====
| 19 April 2024 1 | Al Ahly Ly (Libyan Arab Basketball Federation) | 93–71 | (Fédération Centrafricaine de Basketball) Bangui SC | 6th of October |
| 4:00 PM | Scoring by quarter: 23–29, 31–13, 18–16, 21–13 |
| | Pts: Murphy 21; Rebs: Deng 8 Asts: Jackson 11 | Livestats | Pts: Fula Nganga 19; Rebs: Nwabuzor 9 Asts: Nwabuzor 4 | Arena: Hassan Moustafa Sports Hall; Attendance: 975; Referees: Kaz Beverly, Sara Elsharnouby, Claudio Eiuba |

| 20 April 2024 2 | Bangui SC (Fédération Centrafricaine de Basketball) | 101–88 | (Uganda Basketball Association) City Oilers | 6th of October |
| 4:00 PM | Scoring by quarter: 23–26, 27–17, 25–27, 26–18 |
| | Pts: Darlan 22; Rebs: Darlan 10; Asts: Nwabuzor 10 | Livestats | Pts: Maluach 29; Rebs: Maluach 11; Asts: Culpepper, Rembert 5 | Arena: Hassan Moustafa Sports Hall; Attendance: 543; Referees: Kelsey Reynolds, Annie Joyce Muchenu, Oumar Sy |

| 22 April 2024 3 | Bangui SC (Fédération Centrafricaine de Basketball) | 79–85 | (Egyptian Basketball Federation) Al Ahly | 6th of October |
| 7:00 PM | Scoring by quarter: 18–21, 20–22, 19–20, 22–22 |
| | Pts: Fula Nganga 27; Rebs: Darlan 14; Asts: Darlan, Nwabuzor 3 | Livestats | Pts: Three players 14; Rebs: Mitchell 7 Asts: Lyons, Mitchell 3 | Arena: Hassan Moustafa Sports Hall; Attendance: 1,895; Referees: Kaz Beverly, Jean Sauveur Ruhamiriza, Annie Joyce Muchenu |

| 24 April 2024 4 | Bangui SC (Fédération Centrafricaine de Basketball) | 96–93 | (Libyan Arab Basketball Federation) Al Ahly Ly | 6th of October |
| 4:00 PM | Scoring by quarter: 15–16, 32–29, 24–12, 25–34 |
| | Pts: Fula Nganga 30; Rebs: Darlan 14; Asts: Wegscheider 6 | Livestats | Pts: Lual-Acuil 22; Rebs: Lual-Acuil 10; Asts: Diabate, Jackson 5 | Arena: Hassan Moustafa Sports Hall; Attendance: 453; Referees: Kelsey Reynolds, Mbaye Seye, Sara Elsharnouby |

| 26 April 2024 5 | City Oilers (Uganda) | 76–91 | (Fédération Centrafricaine de Basketball) Bangui SC | 6th of October |
| 4:00 PM | Scoring by quarter: 12–19, 22–27, 27–18, 15–17 |
| | Pts: Rembert 21; Rebs: Maluach 13; Asts: Culpepper 6 | Livestats | Pts: Ngaïfei 22; Rebs: Ngaïfei 11; Asts: Darlan 7 | Arena: Hassan Moustafa Sports Hall; Attendance: 678; Referees: Kaz Beverly, Sara Elsharnouby, Oumar Sy |

| 27 April 2024 6 | Al Ahly (Egyptian Basketball Federation) | 94–71 | (Central African Republic) Bangui SC | 6th of October |
| 7:00 PM | Scoring by quarter: 28–15, 25–17, 21–21, 20–18 |
| | Pts: Ali 13; Rebs: Gardner 7 Asts: Three players 6 | Livestats | Pts: Wegscheider 16; Rebs: Djimbaraye 11; Asts: Wegscheider 4 | Arena: Hassan Moustafa Sports Hall; Attendance: 3,003; Referees: Kelsey Reynolds, Jean Sauveur Ruhamiriza, Silver Houngbedji |

== Player statistics ==
Legend
| GP | Games played | GS | Games started | MPG | Minutes per game |
| FG% | Field-goal percentage | 3P% | 3-point field-goal percentage | FT% | Free-throw percentage |
| RPG | Rebounds per game | APG | Assists per game | SPG | Steals per game |
| BPG | Blocks per game | PPG | Points per game |

Bangui Sporting Club statistics
| Player | GP | MPG | FG% | 3FG% | FT% | RPG | APG | SPG | BPG | PPG |
|---|---|---|---|---|---|---|---|---|---|---|
| Rolly Fula Nganga | 6 | 37.6 | .524 | .478 | .688 | 3.2 | 1.5 | 2.0 | 0.7 | 20.2 |
| Thierry Darlan | 6 | 30.0 | .410 | .250 | .800 | 8.7 | 3.5 | 0.8 | 1.0 | 17.7 |
| Jimmy Djimrabaye | 6 | 30.6 | .548 | .417 | .643 | 6.7 | 3.3 | 1.5 | 0.3 | 10.0 |
| Kurt-Curry Wegscheider | 6 | 24.8 | .448 | .364 | .818 | 3.2 | 2.5 | 2.0 | 0.0 | 10.8 |
| Michael Nwabuzor | 4 | 27.1 | .342 | .154 | .667 | 5.5 | 4.8 | 0.5 | 0.0 | 8.0 |
| Evans Ganapamo | 3 | 26.5 | .239 | .083 | .625 | 2.0 | 1.7 | 1.3 | 0.0 | 9.3 |
| Yasser Kamayengue | 5 | 9.6 | .375 | .333 | .667 | 1.6 | 1.6 | 0.6 | 0.0 | 3.8 |
| Metson Nambaï | 5 | 10.2 | .444 | .375 | 1.000 | 1.0 | 0.8 | 0.2 | 0.0 | 4.0 |
| Omega Ngaifei | 6 | 17.9 | .419 | .000 | .733 | 6.3 | 0.5 | 0.2 | 0.2 | 6.2 |
| Nyang Wek | 6 | 9.9 | .636 | .500 | .667 | 3.2 | 0.2 | 0.5 | 0.2 | 3.5 |
| Curtis Hollis | 2 | 4.0 | .000 | .000 | .000 | 1.0 | 0.0 | 0.0 | 0.0 | 0.0 |
