= Abdou Ndoye =

Senegalese basketball player

No. 15 – Urunani
- Position: Center
- League: Road to BAL

Personal information
- Born: 21 November 1989 (age 36) Dakar, Senegal
- Listed height: 7 ft 0 in (2.13 m)
- Listed weight: 240 lb (109 kg)

Career information
- High school: International School of Management (Dakar, Senegal)
- College: New Mexico State (2009–2011); East Texas A&M (2011–2013)
- NBA draft: 2013: undrafted
- Playing career: 2013–present

Career history
- 2014–2015: Kutaisi
- 2016: Apollon Limassol
- 2016: Metros de Santiago
- 2018: Halcones de Sonzacate
- 2022: AS Salé
- 2023: Bangui Sporting Club
- 2024: Cape Town Tigers
- 2024–present: Urunani

Career highlights
- BAL blocks leader (2024)

Mouhamadou Abdoulaye Ndoye (born 21 November 1989) is a Senegalese basketball player for Urunani of the Basketball Africa League (BAL). Standing at 2.13 m (7 ft 0 in), he is a center.

== College career ==
Ndoye was born in Dakar, and appeared in multiple basketball camps in South Africa. After graduating from Group Scholar Machala in 2007, and spending two years at the International School of Management, he played two seasons for the New Mexico State Aggies in the United States. He played in twelve games in his freshman season and scored his first basket in his sophomore season.

He transferred to the Texas A&M–Commerce Lions in 2011 and led the Lone Star Conference in blocks in his first season. Ndoye was Texas A&M's defensive player of the year.

== Professional career ==
Ndoye played with Kutaisi 2010 of the Georgian Superliga in the 2014–15 season, averaging 6.6 points and 8.5 rebounds per game.

Ndoye was selected with the 16th pick of the 5th round of the 2015 NBA Development League draft by the Austin Spurs.

In 2016, he joined Apollon Limassol of the Cyprus Basketball Division A, before transferring to the Metros de Santiago in the Dominican Republic later that year.

In 2018, Ndoye played for the Halcones de Sonzacate in El Salvador.

Ndoye played with Bangui Sporting Club in the first round of the 2024 BAL qualification, averaging no points and 4 rebounds per game. In May 2024, he joined the Cape Town Tigers for the 2024 BAL playoffs. He led the league in blocks with 3.5 blocks per game.

In November 2024, Ndoye joined Burundian team Urunani ahead of the Elite 16 of the 2025 BAL qualification.
