= Ivan Jeremić =

Serbian basketball coach

Al Ahly Ly
- Position: Head coach
- League: BAL

Personal information
- Born: 21 August 1961 (age 65) Priština, FPR Yugoslavia
- Coaching career: 1984–present

Career history

Coaching
- 1984–1990: Crvena zvezda (youth)
- 1990–1992: Tašmajdan
- 1992–1994: Stari grad
- 1994–1995: OKK Beograd
- 1996–1998: Hemofarm
- 2001–2002: Libya
- 2002–2005: CSKA Moscow (assistant)
- 2005–2007: Libya
- 2007–2008: Lietuvos rytas (assistant)
- 2008–2009: Kyiv (assistant)
- 2009–2010: CSKA Moscow (assistant)
- 2010–2012: UNICS (assistant)
- 2012–2014: Lokomotiv-Kuban (assistant)
- 2015–2016: Al Shabab
- 2016–2019: Al-Muharraq
- 2019–2021: Kazma
- 2021–present: Al Nasr
- 2024–present: Al-Aly Ly

Career highlights
- As head coach: Bahraini League champion (2019); Bahrain Cup winner (2017); As assistant coach: 2× EuroCup champion (2011, 2013); VTB United League champion (2010); 4× Russian League champion (2003–2005, 2010); 2× Russian Cup winner (2005, 2010)

Ivan Jeremić (Serbian Cyrillic: Иван Јеремић; born 21 August 1961) is a Serbian professional basketball coach for Al Ahly Ly of the Basketball Africa League (BAL). He has coached several teams in Serbia, Ukraine, Lithuania, Russia, Bahrain, Kuwait and the United Arab Emirates, among others. He has coached the Libyan national basketball team in two different stints.

== Coaching career ==
Jeremić coached Serbian teams Tašmajdan, Stari Grad, OKK Beograd and Hemofarm.

Jeremić joined CSKA Moscow coaching staff in 2002 when Serbian coach Dušan Ivković was named a head coach. Furthermore, he was a coaching staff member of Russian coach Evgeniy Pashutin at CSKA Moscow, UNICS and Lokomotiv-Kuban.

He had one-year stint in Libya as head coach of Al Shabab. In 2016, Jeremić was named a head coach of Al-Muharraq of the Bahraini Premier League. In 2017, he won Bahraini Cup. On 16 September 2020, he signed a one-year contract extension with Kazma of the Kuwaiti Division I.

Jeremić has been a president of the Basketball Coaches Association of Serbia (UKTS) as of January 2016.

On April 19, 2024, Jeremic made his head coaching debut in the Basketball Africa League (BAL) as coach of Al-Ahly Ly.

=== National team ===
Jeremić had two stints with the Libya national basketball team during the 2000s.

== Career achievements ==
As head coach

- Bahraini League champion: 1 (with: Al-Muharraq: 2018–19)
- Khalifa Bin Salman Cup winner: 1 (with: Al-Muharraq: 2016–17)

As assistant coach

- EuroCup winner: 2 (with UNICS Kazan: 2010–11; with Lokomotiv-Kuban: 2012–13)
- VTB United League champion: 1 (with: CSKA Moscow: 2009–10)
- Russian League champion: 4 (with: CSKA Moscow: 2002–03, 2003–04, 2004–05, 2009–10)
- Russian Cup winner: 2 (with: CSKA Moscow: 2004–05, 2009–10)
