= Samkelo Cele =

South African basketball player (born 1997)

Petro de Luanda
- Position: Shooting guard
- League: Basketball Africa League

Personal information
- Born: 28 December 1997 (age 28) Durban, South Africa
- Listed height: 1.94 m (6 ft 4 in)
- Listed weight: 95 kg (209 lb)

Career information
- High school: Durban High School (Durban, South Africa); Bull City Prep Academy (Charlotte, North Carolina)
- College: Northeastern Oklahoma A&M (2019–2021); Marist (2021–2022); USAO (2022–2023)
- Playing career: 2015–present

Career history
- 2023–2024: Cape Town Tigers
- 2024: Dynamo
- 2025: Real Valladolid
- 2025: Petro de Luanda
- 2025-Present: Otef Darom BC

Career highlights
- All-BAL First Team (2024); 2× BAL All-Defensive Team (2023, 2024); NAIA All-American Third-Team (2023); BAL All-Defensive Team (2024)

Samkelo Brian Cele (born 28 December 1997) is a South African professional basketball player who plays for Otef Darom BC of the Liga Leumit. Born in Durban, he played college basketball for three different universities. Cele began playing professionally in 2023 and was an All-BAL First Team selection in 2024, and is a two-time BAL All-Defensive Team selection, all while playing for the Tigers.

== Early life ==
Born in Durban, Cele received a basketball scholarship for Durban High School, one of the best schools in the city. After graduating in 2016, he moved to the United States to play for Bull City Prep in Charlotte, North Carolina. Cele also attended a basketball camp in Serbia in 2015. Cele played with the KwaZulu Marlins of the South African top tier Basketball National League (BNL) in 2015, at age 17.

== College career ==
Cele played for Northeastern Oklahoma A&M College for two years, for Southern University for one year in 2020–21, and Marist College in 2021–22. With the Marist Red Foxes, Cele started in 27 games.

He then finished his career with the University of Science and Arts of Oklahoma in the NAIA, because he was ineligible to continue in the NCAA, and was named an All-American third-team selection in 2023. He averaged 20.8 points and 5.2 rebounds per game, while shooting 52.8% from the field and 41.3% on three-pointers.

== Professional career ==
=== 2022–23 season ===
In 2023, Cele signed his first professional contract with the South African team Cape Town Tigers of the Basketball Africa League (BAL). On 6 May 2023, on the final day of the Nile Conference, Cele scored 28 points in a win over City Oilers, that clinched the Tigers' playoff spot. He was named to the BAL All-Defensive Team for the 2023 BAL season. Cele averaged 13 points, 5.3 rebounds, 3 assists, and 2.5 steals per game and shot 46.8 percent from the field in his four BAL games.

=== 2023–24 season ===
In the 2023–24 season, Cele took a leap in his game and helped the Tigers to the fourth place in the 2024 BAL season. He averaged 20.2 points per game (second in the league) and 2.4 steals per game (third-most in the league). He was named to his first All-BAL First Team, becoming the first South African to be named to the team; Cele was also named to another BAL All-Defensive Team.

Cele played for the New York Knicks in the 2024 NBA Summer League.

In August 2024, he joined Dynamo of Burundi for the playoffs of the Viva Basketball League.

=== 2024–25 season ===
In March 2025, Cele joined Spanish club Real Valladolid, his first European club.

On May 12, 2025, he was announced by the defending champions Petro de Luanda for the playoffs of the 2025 BAL season.

== National team career ==
Cele made his debut for the South Africa national team in February 2024 during the pre-qualifiers for AfroBasket 2025.

== BAL career statistics ==
Legend
GP	Games played	GS	Games started	MPG	Minutes per game
FG%	Field goal percentage	3P%	3-point field goal percentage	FT%	Free throw percentage
RPG	Rebounds per game	APG	Assists per game	SPG	Steals per game
BPG	Blocks per game	PPG	Points per game	**Bold**	Career high

Year	Team	GP	GS	MPG	FG%	3P%	FT%	RPG	APG	SPG	BPG	PPG
2023	Cape Town	6	3	30.6	**.478**	.235	.524	**5.3**	2.3	2.0	0.2	13.5
2024	Cape Town	**7**	**7**	**33.8**	.389	**.268**	**.760**	4.6	**2.7**	**2.4**	0.2	**21.0**
