= Billy Preston (basketball) =

American basketball player (born 1997)

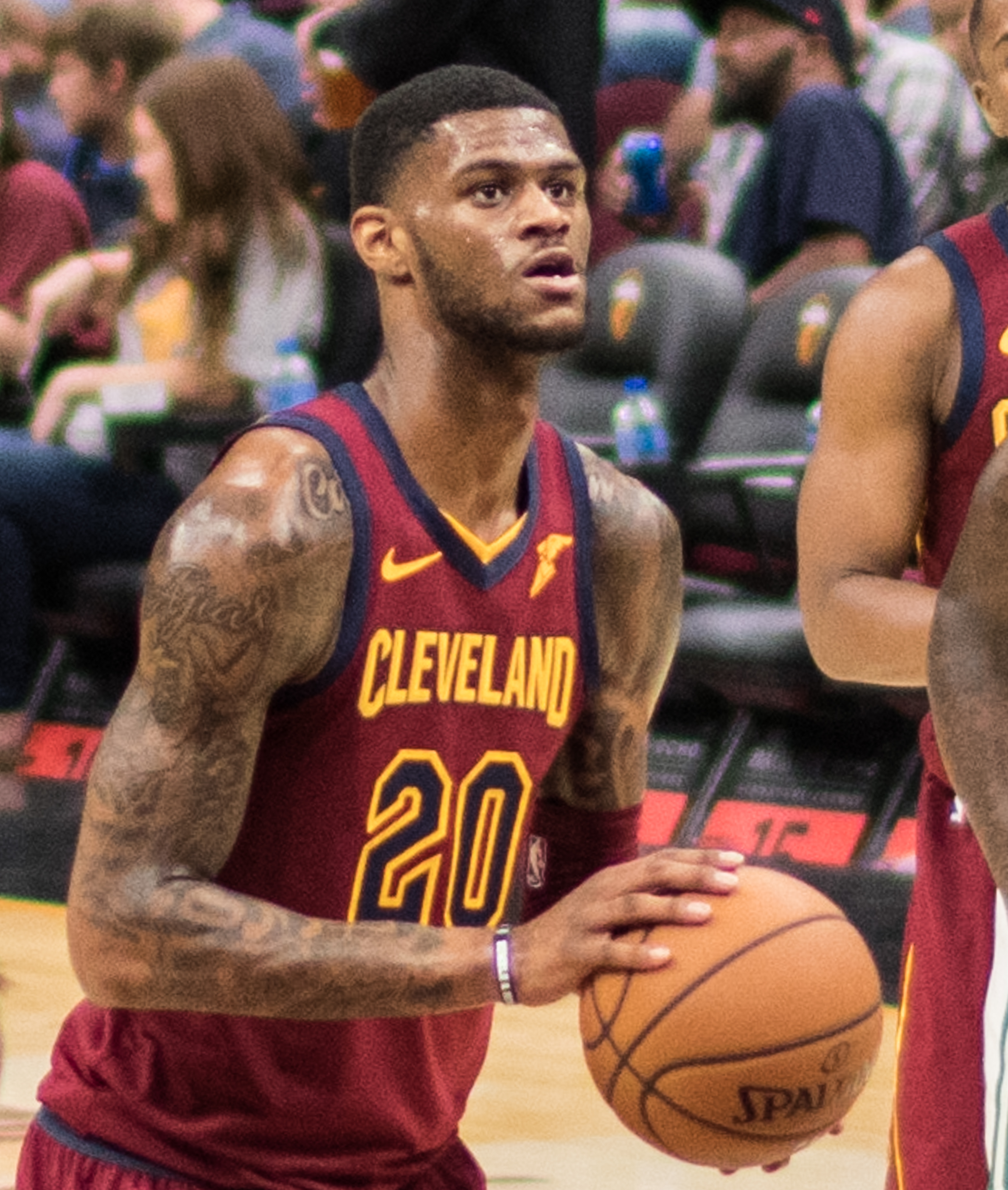
- Preston with the Cavs in the 2018 preseason

Free agent
- Position: Power forward

Personal information
- Born: October 26, 1997 (age 28) Redondo Beach, California, USA
- Listed height: 6 ft 10 in (2.08 m)
- Listed weight: 240 lb (109 kg)

Career information
- High school: St. John Bosco (Bellflower, California); Redondo Union (Redondo Beach, California); Prime Prep (Dallas, Texas); Advanced Prep International (Dallas, Texas); Oak Hill Academy (Mouth of Wilson, Virginia)
- NBA draft: 2018: undrafted
- Playing career: 2018–present

Career history
- 2018: Igokea
- 2018: Canton Charge
- 2018–2019: Erie BayHawks
- 2019: Texas Legends
- 2019: Illawarra Hawks
- 2020: Metropolitanos de Mauricio Baez
- 2021–2022: Cape Town Tigers
- 2024: Cape Town Tigers
- 2025–2026: Tijuana Zonkeys

Career highlights
- 2× South African National Championship champions (2021, 2022); Bosnian Cup winner (2018); McDonald's All-American (2017)
- Stats at Basketball Reference

Billy Dewon Preston Jr. (born October 26, 1997) is an American professional basketball player for the Tijuana Zonkeys of the Circuito de Baloncesto de la Costa del Pacífico (CIBACOPA). A power forward, he attended four high schools: St. John Bosco High School, Redondo Union High School, Prime Prep Academy, and Oak Hill Academy. He was ranked among the top recruits of his class, earning McDonald's All-American honors while at Oak Hill.

Following high school, Preston enrolled at the University of Kansas and had signed to play basketball for the Jayhawks. In November 2017, he was involved in an on-campus car accident that resulted in no injuries. Preston, without having played any games, was sidelined until the completion of a university investigation into the incident. After being barred for over two months, he opted to play at the professional level instead.

== High school career ==
A Santa Ana, California native, Preston attended St. John Bosco High School in Bellflower, California and Redondo Union High School in Redondo Beach, California, followed by a stint at Prime Prep in Dallas, Texas. In 2016, he transferred to Oak Hill Academy. He had per-game averages of 15.3 points and 9.2 rebounds as a senior at Oak Hill.

In November 2016, he committed to Kansas, after he had also visited Syracuse, Indiana and the University of Southern California during the recruiting process.

Preston played in the 2017 McDonald's All-American Boys Game, scoring ten points and grabbing three rebounds. In the 2017 Jordan Brand Classic, he tallied seven points in 15 minutes of play.

== College career ==
Preston was held out of the Kansas Jayhawks lineup indefinitely due to a car accident on KU campus on November 8, 2017. The accident, which resulted in no personal injuries, triggered an NCAA investigation into the "financial picture" of the vehicle. On January 20, 2018, Preston left Kansas in the middle of the 2017–18 season due to frustration over the investigation. Although he played in Jayhawks exhibition games before the accident, he played no regular-season games for the team.

== Professional career ==
=== KK Igokea (2018) ===
On January 20, 2018, Preston signed with Igokea Laktaši of the ABA League and Bosnian League. He made his professional debut 9 days later, recording 2 points, 2 assists, 1 rebound, and 1 steal in 6 minutes of play in a win against Zadar. On March 4, 2018, after playing in only three ABA League games with Igokea, Preston left Igokea due to a sore shoulder which persistently hurt him during his last two weeks with the team. His name would officially pop up as one of a record-high 236 underclassmen to declare entry for the 2018 NBA draft on April 24, 2018. Ten days later, Preston was announced as one of a record-high 69 invites for the NBA Draft Combine that year.

=== Canton Charge (2018) ===
Ultimately, Preston went undrafted that year. However, he signed with the Cleveland Cavaliers on June 23, 2018, as a member of their 2018 NBA Summer League team. On July 7, Preston signed a two-way contract with the Cavaliers, meaning he would split his playing time between them and their NBA G League affiliate, the Canton Charge, for the 2018–19 season, with the contract also going into the 2019–2020 season. On December 2, 2018, Preston was waived without appearing in a game for the Cavaliers.

=== Erie BayHawks (2018–2019) ===
On December 16, 2018, the Erie BayHawks of the NBA G League announced that they had acquired Preston from Canton Charge for the returning right of Jordan Mathews. On February 8, 2019, Preston was traded to the Texas Legends.

=== Texas Legends (2019) ===
On February 8, 2019, Preston was traded to the Texas Legends for the returning rights of Codi Miller-McIntyre. After just over a month into the 2019–20 NBA G League season, Preston left for the National Basketball League of Australia.

=== Illawarra Hawks (2019) ===
On December 9, 2019, Preston signed with the Illawarra Hawks of the Australian National Basketball League (NBL). He was released after only three games.

=== Dominican Republic (2019) ===
In 2019, Preston played for Metropolitanos de Mauricio Baez of the Dominican Torneo de Baloncesto Superior (TBS).

=== Cape Town Tigers (2021–2022) ===
In September 2021, Preston signed with the Cape Town Tigers of the Basketball Africa League (BAL), ahead of the qualifiers of the 2022 BAL season. He helped Cape Town successfully qualify, after averaging 16.6 points and 9.4 rebounds in five qualifying games. On April 12, 2022, Preston made his debut in the BAL against Zamalek, scoring a team-high 26 points.

In September 2023, Preston signed with the New Taipei Kings of the P. League+ (PLG). In October 2023, Preston left the Kings, he played for the Kings in two PLG preseason games.

=== Second stint with the Cape Town Tigers (2024) ===
Preston returned for a second stint with the Cape Town Tigers in March 2024 for the 2024 BAL season. He was not on the roster for the playoffs.

On May 15, 2024, Preston signed with the Calgary Surge of the Canadian Elite Basketball League, but didn't play any game.
