= John Jordan (basketball, born 1992) =

American basketball player (born 1992)

No. 7 – FUS Rabat
- League: BAL; Division Excellence

Personal information
- Born: October 7, 1992 (age 34) Houston, Texas, U.S.
- Listed height: 5 ft 10 in (1.78 m)

Career information
- High school: Hightower (Missouri City, Texas)
- College: Texas A&M-CC (2011–2015)
- NBA draft: 2015: undrafted
- Playing career: 2015–present

Career history
- 2015: Delaware Blue Coats
- 2015–2016: Erie BayHawks
- 2016–2017: Raptors 905
- 2017–2018: Salon Vilpas Vikings
- 2018: Liège Basket
- 2018: Krosno
- 2019–2020: Tigers Tübingen
- 2020–2021: Tamiš
- 2021–2022: CSM Petrolul Ploiesti
- 2022–2023: Zdravlje
- 2023–present: FUS Rabat

Career highlights
- NBA D-League champion (2017); 2× All-SLC First Team (2014, 2015); NABC All-District Team (2015)

Johnathan "John" Devante Jordan (born 7 October 1992) is an American naturalized Congolese basketball player who plays for FUS Rabat of the Division Excellence and the Basketball Africa League (BAL). He plays as point guard and played collegiately for Texas A&M University–Corpus Christi before turning professional in 2015.

== College career ==
Following four seasons under David Green at Hightower High School, Jordan played four seasons with the Texas A&M University–Corpus Christi Islanders from 2011 to 2015. In his freshman season, Jordan set a season record for most assists in a season with 138. He averaged 6.5 rebounds and 3.3 assists per game as the Islanders' starting point guard. He broke his record again in his sophomore season, and in his junior season Jordan earned First Team All-Southland honours. Jordan set the team's assists record once again in his senior season, this time with 178 assists, and was named to the NABC All-District as well. He was inducted to the Islanders' Hall of Honor in 2022.

== Professional career ==
Jordan began his career in the NBA Development League with the Delaware Blue Coats and later the Erie BayHawks. He then moved to the Raptors 905 and helped the Raptors to their first-ever league championship in 2017 under head coach Jerry Stackhouse. That season, he also won the D-League Dunk Contest.

He then moved to Europe where he played for teams in Finland (Salon Vilpas), Belgium (Liège Basket), Germany (Tigers Tübingen) and Serbia (KK Tamiš), Romania (CSM Petrolul Ploiești) and Serbia again (KK Zdravlje).

Jordan joined Moroccan champions FUS Rabat for the 2023–24 season. Jordan was instrumental in Rabat's campaign in the Road to BAL where they successfully clinched for the BAL. He averaged 20.3 points, 3 rebounds and 5.3 assists per game. On March 9, 2024, Jordan made his BAL debut by scoring 17 points in a 82–73 win over Petro de Luanda.

== National team career ==
In July 2025, Jordan was announced as a member of the DR Congo national team following his naturalization. He made his debut at AfroBasket 2025, and his first game was on August 13, 2025, when he had 9 assists in a group phase loss to Ivory Coast.
