= 2023 NBBF Premier League =

- League: Nigerian Premier League
- Sport: Basketball
- Duration: 22 October 2023 - 25 November 2023
- Teams: 24

Conference Eight

Final Four
- Champions: Rivers Hoopers (5th title)
- Runners-up: Gboko City Chiefs

Seasons
- ← 2022 2024 →

The 2023 NBBF Premier League was the 22nd season of the NBBF Premier League, the top-flight basketball league in Nigeria organised by the Nigeria Basketball Federation (NBBF). The season began on 22 October 2023 and ended on 25 November 2023 The champions qualified directly for the 2024 BAL season. The Final Four was staged in Port Harcourt.

The Kwara Falcons were the defending champions, but were eliminated in the conference stage. The Rivers Hoopers won their 5th national title with an undefeated 13–0 record. The Hoopers clinched their title on 25 November, after winning the final game of the Final Four.

== First phase ==
The first phase ran from 22 to 29 October 2023 and was held in four groups of six or seven teams, divided in two conferences. The four host cities were Abuja, Lafia, Asaba and Ibadan. The top two teams from each group advance to the Conference Eight, the remaining teams were relegated to the Division One for the 2024 season.

Initially, 31 teams were announced for the first phase. After withdrawals, the league began with 24 teams.

=== Savannah Conference ===
==== Abuja ====
| Pos | Team | Pld | W | L | GF | GA | GD | Pts | Qualification |
|---|---|---|---|---|---|---|---|---|---|
| 1 | Nigeria Customs | 5 | 5 | 0 | 413 | 325 | +88 | 10 | Advance to Conference Eight |
| 2 | Nile University | 5 | 4 | 1 | 342 | 335 | +7 | 9 | Advance to Conference Eight |
| 3 | Kano Pillars | 5 | 3 | 2 | 382 | 325 | +57 | 8 | Advance to Conference Eight |
| 4 | Bauchi Nets | 5 | 2 | 3 | 332 | 364 | −32 | 7 | Advance to Conference Eight |
| 5 | Niger Potters | 5 | 1 | 4 | 294 | 345 | −51 | 6 | Relegated to NBBF National Division One |
| 6 | Kada Stars | 5 | 0 | 5 | 337 | 406 | −69 | 5 | Relegated to NBBF National Division One |

Source: NBBF

==== Lafia ====
| Pos | Team | Pld | W | L | GF | GA | GD | Pts | Qualification |
|---|---|---|---|---|---|---|---|---|---|
| 1 | Plateau Peaks | 5 | 4 | 1 | 318 | 285 | +33 | 9 | Advance to Conference Eight |
| 2 | Gboko City Chiefs | 5 | 4 | 1 | 311 | 231 | +80 | 9 | Advance to Conference Eight |
| 3 | Gombe Bulls | 5 | 3 | 2 | 328 | 332 | −4 | 8 | Advance to Conference Eight |
| 4 | Correctional | 5 | 3 | 2 | 305 | 305 | 0 | 8 | Advance to Conference Eight |
| 5 | Defenders | 5 | 1 | 4 | 298 | 347 | −49 | 6 | Relegated to NBBF National Division One |
| 6 | Benue Braves | 5 | 0 | 5 | 240 | 300 | −60 | 5 | Relegated to NBBF National Division One |

Source: NBBF

=== Atlantic Conference ===
==== Asaba ====
Oriental Giants, Camac and Lagos Warriors were also announced to be in this group but did not play.

| Pos | Team | Pld | W | L | GF | GA | GD | Pts | Qualification |
|---|---|---|---|---|---|---|---|---|---|
| 1 | Rivers Hoopers | 4 | 4 | 0 | 334 | 246 | +88 | 8 | Advance to Conference Eight |
| 2 | Lagos Legends | 4 | 3 | 1 | 299 | 253 | +46 | 7 | Advance to Conference Eight |
| 3 | Police Baton | 4 | 2 | 2 | 269 | 277 | −8 | 6 | Advance to Conference Eight |
| 4 | Delta Force | 4 | 1 | 3 | 270 | 326 | −56 | 5 | Advance to Conference Eight |
| 5 | Raptors | 4 | 0 | 4 | 240 | 310 | −70 | 4 | Relegated to NBBF National Division One |

Source: NBBF

==== Ibadan ====
Lagos Islanders was also announced to be in this group, but did not play.

| Pos | Team | Pld | W | L | GF | GA | GD | Pts | Qualification |
|---|---|---|---|---|---|---|---|---|---|
| 1 | Kwara Falcons | 6 | 5 | 1 | 423 | 392 | +31 | 11 | Advance to Conference Eight |
| 2 | Ebun Comets | 6 | 5 | 1 | 371 | 279 | +92 | 11 | Advance to Conference Eight |
| 3 | Hoops & Read | 6 | 4 | 2 | 434 | 353 | +81 | 10 | Advance to Conference Eight |
| 4 | Oluyole Warriors | 6 | 4 | 2 | 366 | 327 | +39 | 10 | Advance to Conference Eight |
| 5 | Impressions | 6 | 2 | 4 | 288 | 355 | −67 | 8 | Relegated to NBBF National Division One |
| 6 | Ondo Raiders | 6 | 1 | 5 | 316 | 379 | −63 | 7 | Relegated to NBBF National Division One |
| 7 | Invaders | 6 | 0 | 6 | 309 | 435 | −126 | 6 | Relegated to NBBF National Division One |

Source: NBBF

== Conference Eight ==
The Conference Eight phase was played by the eight highest placed teams from each conference. It was initially scheduled to only feature eight teams, and was to be held from 4 to 14 November 2023 in Lagos. Later, ihe NBBF announced that the Savannah Conference was hosted in Abuja, and the Atlantic Conference was hosted in Akure.

=== Atlantic Conference ===
Delta Force withdrew ahead of the Conference Eight. The Rivers Hoopers won the Atlantic Conference after going undefeated in their six games; Hoops & Read finished in second place.

| Home \ Away | COM | HOR | KWA | LLG | OLU | POL | RIV |
|---|---|---|---|---|---|---|---|
| Ebun Comets | — | | | | | 51–47 | |
| Hoops & Read | | — | | 82–71 | | | |
| Kwara Falcons | | | — | | 80–44 | | |
| Lagos Legends | 62–50 | | | — | | | |
| Oluyole Warriors | | | | | — | | 61–80 |
| Police Baton | | 55–78 | | | 63–49 | — | |
| Rivers Hoopers | 82–54 | | 83–56 | | | | — |

Updated to match(es) played on 9 November 2023. Source: NBBF on X
Legend: Blue = home team win; Yellow = draw; Red = away team win.

=== Savannah Conference ===
Bauchi Nets withdrew ahead of the Conference Eight. Nigeria Customs emerged champions of the Savannah Conference, after winning all their six games. The Gboko City Chiefs finished in second place.

| Home \ Away | BAU | COR | CUS | GBO | GOM | KAN | NIL | PLA |
|---|---|---|---|---|---|---|---|---|
| Bauchi Nets | — | 0–20 | | | | | | |
| Correctionals | | — | | | 67–70 | 90–92 | | |
| Nigeria Customs | | 91–62 | — | | | 73–64 | 88–67 | |
| Gboko City Chiefs | 20–0 | 91–78 | 75–83 | — | | | 76–62 | |
| Gombe Bulls | | | | 72–69 | — | | | |
| Kano Pillars | | | | | 85–82 | — | 63–65 | 59–55 |
| Nile Spartans | | 78–79 | | | 78–74 | | — | |
| Plateau Peaks | 20–0 | | 56–97 | 48–89 | 70–73 | | 50–68 | — |

Updated to match(es) played on 13 November 2023. Source: NBBF on X
Legend: Blue = home team win; Yellow = draw; Red = away team win.

== Final Four ==
The Final Four will be held from 22 to 25 November. Rivers Hoopers, Hoops & Read, Nigeria Customs and Gboko City Chiefs are the four qualified teams. On 16 November, Port Harcourt was announced as the host city. The last time Port Harcourt hosted the Final Eight of the Premier League was in 2010.

| Pos | Team | Pld | W | L | GF | GA | GD | Pts | Qualification | RIV | GBC | NIG | H&R |
|---|---|---|---|---|---|---|---|---|---|---|---|---|---|
| 1 | Rivers Hoopers (C) | 3 | 3 | 0 | 218 | 187 | +31 | 6 | Qualification to the 2024 BAL season | — | — | 77–57 | 74–68 |
| 2 | Gboko City Chiefs | 3 | 2 | 1 | 213 | 198 | +15 | 5 | | 62–67 | — | — | — |
| 3 | Nigeria Customs | 3 | 1 | 2 | 188 | 205 | −17 | 4 | | — | 66–71 | — | — |
| 4 | Hoops & Read | 3 | 0 | 3 | 195 | 219 | −24 | 3 | | — | 70–80 | 57–65 | — |

Source: NBBF on X
Legend: Blue = home team win; Yellow = draw; Red = away team win.
(C) Champions
