= 2022 NBBF Premier League =

21st season of the Nigerian Basketball Premier League

- League: Nigerian Premier League
- Sport: Basketball
- Duration: 7 November – 12 November 2022 (Final 8)
- Teams: 8

Final 8
- Finals champions: Kwara Falcons (1st title)
- Runners-up: Nigeria Customs
- Finals MVP: Dada Samuel (Kwara Falcons)

Seasons
- ← 2021 2023 →

The 2022 NBBF Premier League was the 21st season of the Nigerian Premier League, the top division of professional basketball in Nigeria. After the 2021 season was organised by the Nigerian Ministry of Youth and Sports, the organisation returned to the Nigeria Basketball Federation (NBBF) this season.

Rivers Hoopers were the defending champions, however, they were eliminated in the semi-finals. Kwara Falcons won their first-ever national championship and qualified directly for the 2023 BAL season. The Falcons' Dada Samuel, who was still a high school student at the time, was named MVP during his first appearance in the Final 8.

== Final 8 ==
The Final 8 was held from 7 November to 12 November 2022 in the Indoor Hall of the National Stadium of Lagos. The two highest-placed teams from each group advanced to the semi-finals.

=== Standings ===
==== Atlantic Conference ====
Pos	2022 Final 8 Atlantic Conference							
Pos	Team	Pld	W	L	Pnt	PF	PA	PD
1	Kwara Falcons	4	3	1	7	269	253	+16
2	Rivers Hoopers	4	3	1	7	264	265	+1
3	Police Baton	4	0	4	4	135	190	–55
4	Lagos Islanders	4	0	4	4	206	274	–68

==== Savannah Conference ====
Pos	2022 Final 8 Savannah Conference							
Pos	Team	Pld	W	L	Pnt	PF	PA	PD
1	Nigeria Customs	4	3	1	7	281	237	+44
2	Benue Braves	4	3	1	7	256	232	+24
3	Kano Pillars	4	2	2	6	255	220	+35
4	Gombe Bulls	4	2	2	6	261	228	+33

=== Games ===
Each team played four games over a four-day stretch from 7 November to 10 November.

7 November 2022	Gombe Bulls	66–55	Lagos Islanders
7 November 2022	Kwara Falcons	65–58	Benue Braves
7 November 2022	Rivers Hoopers	62–60	Nigeria Customs
7 November 2022	Kano Pillars	55–53	Police Baton
8 November 2022	Rivers Hoopers	67–60	Gombe Bulls
8 November 2022	Lagos Islanders	54–70	Nigeria Customs
8 November 2022	Benue Braves	61–43	Police Baton
8 November 2022	Kano Pillars	54–65	Kwara Falcons
9 November 2022	Lagos Islanders	58–59	Benue Braves
9 November 2022	Police Baton	49–71	Nigeria Customs
9 November 2022	Gombe Bulls	61–67	Kwara Falcons
9 November 2022	Rivers Hoopers	69–67	Kano Pillars
10 November 2022	Gombe Bulls	74–39	Police Baton
10 November 2022	Rivers Hoopers	66–78	Benue Braves
10 November 2022	Kano Pillars	79–39	Lagos Islanders
10 November 2022	Kwara Falcons	72–80	Nigeria Customs

=== Final round ===
==== Semi-finals ====
11 November 2022
2:00 p.m.

Kwara Falcons	83–59	Benue Braves
Scoring by quarter: 11–17, 25–17, 27–12, 20–13

National Stadium, Lagos

11 November 2022
4:00 p.m.

Nigeria Customs	64–59	Rivers Hoopers

National Stadium, Lagos

==== Final ====
12 November 2022
2:00 p.m.

Kwara Falcons	78–53	Nigeria Customs

National Stadium, Lagos
