= 2019 NBBF President Cup =

2019 NBBF Premier League
- League: Nigerian Premier League
- Sport: Basketball
- Duration: October 2 – October 12, 2019 (League stage); November 12 – November 17, 2019 (Final 8)
- Teams: 22

League stage

Final 8

President's Cup
- Champions: Rivers Hoopers (3rd title)
- Runners-up: Raptors
- Finals MVP: Abdul Yahaya (Rivers Hoopers)

Seasons
- ← 2018 2021 →

The 2019 NBBF Nigerian Premier League was the national championship for Nigerian basketball organised by the Nigeria Basketball Federation (NBBF). The draw was held on 11 November 2019. All game were played at the National Stadium in Lagos. The winners of the President Cup qualify for the 2020 Basketball Africa League (BAL), the newly established pan-African league by FIBA and the NBA. Rivers Hoopers won its third Nigerian championship.

== League stage ==
The league stage was played in a round-robin format. The Atlantic Conference was played from October 12, to October 2022, in the Indoor Sports Hall of the Ahmadu Bello University in Zaria. The Savannah Conference was played in the Indoor Sports Hall in Lagos. The top four teams advance to the Final 8.

=== Atlantic Conference ===
Pos.	Team	GP	W	L	W%	PF	PA	PD
1	Rivers Hoopers							
2	Kwara Falcons							
3	Raptors Lagos							
4	Lagos Islanders							
5	Police Baton							
6	Hoops and Read							
7	Delta Force							
8	Customs Lagos							
9	Dodan Warriors							
10	Invaders							
11	Coal City Miners							
12	Azure Raiders							

=== Savannah Conference ===
Pos.	Team	GP	W	L	W%	PF	PA	PD
1	Niger Potters							
2	Mark Mentors							
3	Nigeria Army Rockets							
4	Abuja Defenders							
5	Plateau Peaks							
6	Gombe Bulls							
7	Kada Stars							
8	Bauchi Nets							
9	Kano Pillars							
10	Benue Braves							

== Final 8 ==
The Final 8 took place from November 12, to November 17, 2021.

=== Group A ===
Pos.	Team	GP	W	L	W%	PF	PA	PD
1	Rivers Hoopers							
2	Lagos Islanders							
3	Nigeria Army Rockets							
4	Benue Braves							

=== Group B ===
Pos.	Team	GP	W	L	W%	PF	PA	PD
1	Kwara Falcons							
2	Niger Potters							
3	Abuja Defenders							
4	Raptors Lagos							

== Final round ==
Semi-finals
16 November
Raptors	84
Niger Potters	81
16 November
Rivers Hoopers	78
Kwara Falcons	64

Final
17 November
Raptors	57
Rivers Hoopers	97
Third place
17 November
Niger Potters	76
Kwara Falcons	77

== Individual awards ==
- Highest Scorer: Oyebanji Mustapha (Kwara Falcons)
- Highest Rebounder: Ebuka Innocent (Raptors)
- Highest Blocked Shots: Victor Anthony
- Highest three points: Ginikachukwu Godpower (Raptors)

President's Cup Best Five
Guards	Forwards	Center
Abdul Yahaya (Hoopers); Ikechukwu Godwin (Hoopers)	Godwin David (Falcons); Gabriel Erameh (Potters)	Ginikachukwu Godspower (Raptors)
President's Cup MVP: Abdul Yahaya (Hoopers)
