= Ogoh Odaudu =

Nigerian basketball player and coach

Rivers Hoopers
- Title: Head coach
- League: NPL; BAL

Personal information
- Born: 3 August 1981 (age 45) Jos, Nigeria
- Listed height: 1.85 m (6 ft 1 in)
- Position: Point guard
- Coaching career: 2009–present

Career history

Coaching
- 2009–present: Rivers Hoopers
- 2019–present: Nigeria (assistant)
- 2019: Nigeria
- 2024: REG

Career highlights
- As head coach: 6× NPL champion (2011, 2012, 2019, 2021, 2023, 2024); BAL Coach of the Year (2024)

Ogoh Odaudu (born 3 August 1981) is a Nigerian retired basketball player and current coach. He currently is the head coach of Rivers Hoopers of the Nigerian Premier League (NPL) and Basketball Africa League (BAL). In his playing years, Odaudu was a player of the Nigeria national basketball team. Odaudu has led the Rivers Hoopers as head coach since 2009 and has led them to six NPL titles.

== Playing career ==
Born in Jos, he has played for the junior Nigerian national team at the 1999 FIBA Under-19 World Championship.

Odaudu was a member of the Nigerian senior team and played with the team at the 2001, 2003 editions of FIBA Africa Championship. He also played at the 2006 Commonwealth Games.

== Coaching career ==
Odaudu has been the head coach of Rivers Hoopers since its establishment in 2009, He coached the team to three Premier League titles. As such, the team qualified for the 2021 BAL season where he coached at the inaugural tournament. Since 2019, Odaudu has been an assistant coach of the Nigerian national team. He was an assistant coach at the 2020 Olympics in Tokyo. Odaudu was the head coach of Nigeria at AfroCan 2019.

The Hoopers returned for a second appearance in the BAL in the 2024 season, and Odaudu led his team to the third place. He won the BAL Coach of the Year award.

In August 2024, Odaudu became the head coach of REG of the Rwanda Basketball League (RBL) playoffs. He returned to the Hoopers in October, and led them to a sixth NPL title.

== Head coaching record ==
Legend
Regular season	G	Games coached	W	Games won	L	Games lost	W–L %	Win–loss %
Playoffs	PG	Playoff games	PW	Playoff wins	PL	Playoff losses	PW–L %	Playoff win–loss %

Team	Year	G	W	L	W–L%	Finish	PG	PW	PL	PW–L%	Result
2021	Rivers Hoopers	3	1	2	.333	3rd in Group A	–	–	–	–	DNQ
2024	Rivers Hoopers	6	4	2	.667	1st in Sahara Conference	4	2	2	.500	Won third place game
