= 2024 NBBF Premier League =

- League: Nigerian Premier League
- Sport: Basketball
- Duration: 25 October – 3 November 2024 (first phase); 13 – 19 November 2024 (Final Eight)
- Teams: 16
- Season MVP: Kelvin Amayo (Rivers Hoopers)

Conference Eight

Final Four
- Champions: Rivers Hoopers (6th title)
- Runners-up: Hoops & Read

Seasons
- ← 2023 2025 →

The 2024 NBBF Premier League was the 23rd season of the NBBF Premier League, the top-flight basketball league in Nigeria organized by the Nigeria Basketball Federation (NBBF). The season began on 25 October 2024 and ended 19 November 2024.

The Rivers Hoopers were the defending champions, and successfully defended their title as they won their sixth championship, defeating Hoops & Read in the final. As champions they qualified directly for the 2025 BAL season.

== Teams ==
Club	City
Savannah Conference
Bauchi Nets	Bauchi
Correctional	Abuja
Gboko City Chiefs	Gboko
Gombe Bulls	Gombe
Kano Pillars	Kano
Nigeria Customs	Lagos
Nile University Spartans	Abuja
Plateau Peaks	Jos
Atlantic Conference
Delta Force	Asaba
Ebun Comets	Lagos
Hoops And Read	Lagos
Kwara Falcons	Ilorin
Lagos Legends	Lagos
Oluyole Warriors	Ibadan
Police Baton	Lagos
Rivers Hoopers	Port-Harcourt

== Format ==
The number of teams was decreased to sixteen, and there were only two phases this season, the first phase and the final eight.

== First phase ==
The Atlantic Conference was played in Benin City, while the Savannah Conference was played in Jos, from 25 October to 3 November 2024. Four teams from each conference advanced to the Final Eight.

== Final Eight ==
The Final Eight will be played from 14 to 19 November 2024 and is organized in Port Harcourt for a second consecutive year.

=== Group phase ===
==== Group A ====
Pos	Team	Pld	W	L	GF	GA	GD	Pts	
1	Hoops & Read	3	2	1	197	171	+26	5	Advance to semi-finals
2	Gboko City Chiefs	3	2	1	217	187	+30	5	Advance to semi-finals
3	Kano Pillars	3	2	1	207	206	+1	5	
4	Police Baton	3	1	2	163	163	0	4	

Source: NBBF on X

==== Group B ====
Pos	Team	Pld	W	L	GF	GA	GD	Pts	
1	Rivers Hoopers	3	3	0	296	150	+146	6	Advance to semi-finals
2	Nile Spartans	3	2	1	178	191	−13	5	Advance to semi-finals
3	Gombe Bulls	3	1	2	182	228	−46	4	
4	Kwara Falcons	3	0	3	134	224	−90	3	

Source: NBBF on X

=== Final round ===
Semi-finals
17 November
Hoops & Read	76
Nile Spartans	58
17 November
Rivers Hoopers	79
Gboko City Chiefs	73

Final
18 November
Hoops & Read	54
Rivers Hoopers	71
Third place
18 November
Nile Spartans	60
Gboko City Chiefs	73

== Individual awards ==
Directly after the championship game, the NBBF announced the all-star five and MVP winners:

All-Star Five

- Michael Okiki (Rivers Hoopers)
- Kelvin Amayo (Rivers Hoopers) – MVP
- Buchi Vincent (Rivers Hoopers)
- Chingka Garba (Gboko City Chiefs)
- Clinton Osabuchi (Hoops & Read)

== Attendances ==
The average league attendance was 374:

Team	Average
Rivers Hoopers	649
Lagos Legends	619
Kano Pillars	599
Nigeria Customs	550
Gombe Bulls	502
Delta Force	452
Gboko City Chiefs	402
Kwara Falcons	398
Police Baton	349
Hoops and Read	303
Ebun Comets	251
Oluyole Warriors	250
Plateau Peaks	198
Correctional	155
Nile University Spartans	153
Bauchi Nets	149
