= Victor Anthony Koko =

Nigerian basketball player

No. 11 – Rivers Hoopers
- Position: Center
- League: Nigerian Premier League

Personal information
- Born: 14 December 1992 (age 33) Ika North East, Nigeria
- Listed height: 2.06 m (6 ft 9 in)
- Listed weight: 85 kg (187 lb)

Career history
- 2014–2019: Mark Mentors
- 2019–present: Rivers Hoopers

Career highlights
- 3× NPL champion (2019, 2021, 2023); NPL Final MVP (2021)

Victor Anthony Koko (born 14 December 1992) is a Nigerian basketball player who plays for Rivers Hoopers and Nigeria. Standing at 2.06 m (6 ft 9 in), he plays as center.

== Professional career ==
Koko was born in Ika North East in the Nigerian Delta State. Since 2019, Koko plays for the Rivers Hoopers. With the team he won the 2019 NBBF President Cup and qualified for the 2021 BAL season. He started in two of the three games for the Hoopers, averaging 7 points and 8 rebounds.

In the 2021 Premier League season, Koko won his second title with the Hoopers. He was named the MVP of the final, after he recorded 14 points, 10 rebounds and 4 blocks in the won game against Gombe Bulls.

== National team career ==
Koko was on the Nigeria national basketball team for FIBA AfroCan 2019 and AfroBasket 2021.

He has also played 3x3 basketball for the Nigerian basketball team, playing at the FIBA 3x3 Africa Cup 2019.

== BAL career statistics ==
Legend
GP	Games played	GS	Games started	MPG	Minutes per game
FG%	Field goal percentage	3P%	3-point field goal percentage	FT%	Free throw percentage
RPG	Rebounds per game	APG	Assists per game	SPG	Steals per game
BPG	Blocks per game	PPG	Points per game	**Bold**	Career high

Year	Team	GP	GS	MPG	FG%	3P%	FT%	RPG	APG	SPG	BPG	PPG
2021	Rivers Hoopers	3	2	20.8	.278	.000	.333	8.3	1.3	.0	2.3	4.0
Career		3	2	20.8	.278	.000	.333	8.3	1.3	.0	2.3	4.0
