= 2017 FIBA Africa Clubs Champions Cup =

- Official tournament logo.
- Season: 2017
- Dates: 11–20 December
- Teams: 12

Regular season
- Season MVP: (Morocco) Abdelhakim Zouita

Finals
- Champions: (Morocco) AS Salé (1st title)
- Runners-up: (Tunisia) Étoile de Radès
- Third place: (Tunisia) US Monastir
- Fourth place: (Angola) Benfica do Libolo

Statistical leaders
Points	(Algeria) Mohamed Harat	24.8
Rebounds	(Democratic Republic of the Congo) Evariste Shonganya	10.8
Assists	(Morocco) Yassine El Mahsini	7.8

The 2017 FIBA Africa Champions Cup was the 32nd edition of the FIBA Africa Basketball Club Championship, the international basketball club tournament of FIBA Africa. The tournament was held in Radès, Tunisia from 11 to 20 December 2017.

The Association Sportive de Salé from Morocco won their maiden title, and their country's second title overall, by defeating Étoile de Radès of the host country, 77-69, in the Finals.

== Qualifiers ==
Zone	Qualified teams	Eliminated teams	Dates
Zone 1	(Tunisia) US Monastir; (Morocco) AS Salé	(Algeria) GS Pétroliers; (Morocco) MAS Fes; (Libya) Al-Nasr Benghazi; (Libya) Al-Ittihad Tripoli	2–7 December
Zone 2			
Zone 3	(Nigeria) Gombe Bulls; (Nigeria) Kano Pillars	(Nigeria) Mark Mentors; (Nigeria) Civil Defenders; (Ghana) Customs Braves; (Benin) ASPAC	11–17 November
Zone 4	(Democratic Republic of the Congo) Mazembe; (Democratic Republic of the Congo) New Generation	(Equatorial Guinea) San Antonio; (Equatorial Guinea) Malabo Kings	30 October–5 November
Zone 5	(Uganda) City Oilers	(Rwanda) Patriots; (Ethiopia) Hawassa City; (Ethiopia) Gondar City; (Kenya) KPA; (Tanzania) ABC; (Tanzania) Savio; (Uganda) Betway Power	1–7 October
Zone 6	(Angola) Interclube; (Angola) Sport Libolo e Benfica	(Botswana) Dolphins; (Botswana) Troopers; (Mozambique) Ferroviário de Maputo; (Mozambique) Ferroviário da Beira; (Zimbabwe) Harare City Hornets	
Zone 7			

== Draw ==
Group A	Group B
(Angola) Interclube (Nigeria) Kano Pillars (Morocco) AS Salé (Uganda) City Oilers (Tunisia) Étoile de Radès (Democratic Republic of the Congo) New Generation	(Mozambique) Ferroviário da Beira (Democratic Republic of the Congo) Mazembe (Angola) Sport Libolo e Benfica (Algeria) GS Pétroliers (Tunisia) US Monastir (Nigeria) Gombe Bulls

== Preliminary round ==
All times are local (UTC+1).

=== Group A ===
Pos	Team	Pld	W	L	PF	PA	PD	Pts	Qualification
1	(Morocco) AS Salé	5	4	1	442	402	+40	9 (Note: Étoile Sportive de Radès 71-78 Association Sportive de Salé)	Advance to quarterfinals
2	(Tunisia) Étoile de Radès	5	4	1	443	336	+107	9	Advance to quarterfinals
3	(Angola) Interclube	5	3	2	380	335	+45	8	Advance to quarterfinals
4	(Uganda) City Oilers	5	2	3	370	406	−36	7	Advance to quarterfinals
5	(Nigeria) Kano Pillars	5	1	4	400	464	−64	6 (Note: ASB New Generation 66-83 Kano Pillars BC)	Advance to 9th-12th Classification
6	(Democratic Republic of the Congo) New Generation	5	1	4	349	441	−92	6	Advance to 9th-12th Classification

Source: FIBA Africa
Notes:

11 December 2017
09:00

Boxscore

Kano Pillars (Nigeria)	83–112	(Morocco) AS Salé
Scoring by quarter: 13–24, 29–25, 19–32, 22–31
Pts: Yahaya 22; Rebs: Ademola 9 Asts: Dike, Yusuf 3		Pts: Najah 23; Rebs: El Mahsini 10; Asts: El Mahsini 9

Salle Omnisport de Radès, Radès
Referees: Hassane Kamate (CIV), David Joao Domingos Manuel (ANG), Guy Sani Kollo (CMR)

11 December 2017
13:30

Boxscore

Interclube (Angola)	89–67	(Democratic Republic of the Congo) New Generation
Scoring by quarter: 25–18, 20–18, 21–19, 23–12
Pts: Ventura 23; Rebs: Barros, Jungo 5 Asts: Salvador 5		Pts: Isungu 27; Rebs: Lisimo Mangendjo, Isungu 6 Asts: Samuna, Lisimo Mangendjo, Kabongo 2

Salle Omnisport de Radès, Radès
Referees: Kingsley Ojeaburu (NGR), Alioune Fall (SEN), Amir Taboubi (TUN)

11 December 2017
18:00

Boxscore

City Oilers (Uganda)	64–102	(Tunisia) Étoile de Radès
Scoring by quarter: 21–26, 10–19, 12–34, 21–23
Pts: Ocitti 14; Rebs: Pegues 8 Asts: Enabu 5		Pts: Abbassi 18; Rebs: Abbassi 10; Asts: Abada 5

Salle Omnisport de Radès, Radès
Referees: Tonton Banza Kalume (COD), Guy Sani Kollo (CMR), Sofiane Si Youcef (ALG)

12 December 2017
11:15

Boxscore

City Oilers (Uganda)	81–91	(Morocco) AS Salé
Scoring by quarter: 17–24, 22–20, 17–20, 25–27
Pts: Opong 23; Rebs: Ndikumana 7 Asts: Opong 6		Pts: Najah 22; Rebs: Najah 9 Asts: Zouita 6

Salle Omnisport de Radès, Radès
Referees: Guy Sani Kollo (CMR), Alioune Fall (SEN), Mbayi Christian Ntela (COD)

12 December 2017
18:00

Boxscore

Étoile de Radès (Tunisia)	108–67	(Democratic Republic of the Congo) New Generation
Scoring by quarter: 32–17, 26–13, 26–21, 24–16
Pts: Salisbery 21; Rebs: Mathews 10; Asts: Abada, Salisbery 5		Pts: Isungu 18; Rebs: Isungu 12; Asts: Kabongo 7

Salle Omnisport de Radès, Radès
Referees: Hassane Kamate (CIV), Alioune Fall (SEN), Kingsley Ojeaburu (NGR)

12 December 2017
20:15

Boxscore

Interclube (Angola)	94–73	(Nigeria) Kano Pillars
Scoring by quarter: 17–20, 21–20, 27–14, 29–19
Pts: Uhegwu 19; Rebs: Kiala, Jungo 9 Asts: Ventura 5		Pts: Dike 17; Rebs: Ademola 6 Asts: Dike 3

Salle Omnisport de Radès, Radès
Referees: Tonton Banza Kalume (COD), Wael Ibrahim Mohamed Mostafa (EGY), Sofiane Si Youcef (ALG)

13 December 2017
11:15

Boxscore

City Oilers (Uganda)	49–67	(Angola) Interclube
Scoring by quarter: 20–16, 13–16, 11–19, 5–16
Pts: Ocitti 13; Rebs: Ocitti 8 Asts: Enabu 2		Pts: Domingos 18; Rebs: Kiala 14; Asts: Rogério, Santana, Ventura 2

Salle Omnisport de Radès, Radès
Referees: Kingsley Ojeaburu (NGR), Mbayi Christian Ntela (COD), Sofiane Si Youcef (ALG)

13 December 2017
18:00

Boxscore

Étoile de Radès (Tunisia)	71–78	(Morocco) AS Salé
Scoring by quarter: 24–19, 13–18, 18–16, 16–25
Pts: El Mabrouk 20; Rebs: Hadidane 10; Asts: Abada 5		Pts: Arnold 31; Rebs: Zouita 7 Asts: El Mahsini 7

Salle Omnisport de Radès, Radès
Referees: Hassane Kamate (CIV), David Joao Domingos Manuel (ANG), Wael Ibrahim Mohamed Mostafa (EGY)

13 December 2017
20:15

Boxscore

New Generation (Democratic Republic of the Congo)	66–83	(Nigeria) Kano Pillars
Scoring by quarter: 15–16, 15–14, 22–28, 14–25
Pts: Kasongo Kasasa 16; Rebs: Ali Bonga 8 Asts: Kabongo 6		Pts: Usman 18; Rebs: Ademola 9 Asts: Dike 5

Salle Omnisport de Radès, Radès
Referees: Sami Belgharek (TUN), Aboulaye Kamagate (CIV), Amir Taboubi (TUN)

15 December 2017
09:00

Boxscore

New Generation (Democratic Republic of the Congo)	60–81	(Uganda) City Oilers
Scoring by quarter: 13–23, 18–16, 15–17, 14–25
Pts: Cathey Macklin, Isungu 15; Rebs: Isungu 11; Asts: Kabongo 11		Pts: Opong 23; Rebs: Tillman 10; Asts: Mayes 4

Salle Omnisport de Radès, Radès
Referees: Hassane Kamate (CIV), Sofiane Si Youcef (ALG), Amir Taboubi (TUN)

15 December 2017
18:00

Boxscore

Kano Pillars (Nigeria)	75–97	(Tunisia) Étoile de Radès
Scoring by quarter: 20–22, 21–23, 15–31, 19–21
Pts: Yahaya 24; Rebs: Ademola 14; Asts: Dike 4		Pts: El Mabrouk 15; Rebs: Mathews, Hadidane 7 Asts: Abada 9

Salle Omnisport de Radès, Radès
Referees: Mohamed Elmenshawy (EGY), David Joao Domingos Manuel (ANG), Guy Sani Kollo (CMR)

15 December 2017
20:15

Boxscore

AS Salé (Morocco)	81–78	(Angola) Interclube
Scoring by quarter: 23–28, 18–17, 22–18, 18–15
Pts: Kourdou 20; Rebs: Najah 10; Asts: El Masbahi, Zouita 5		Pts: Barros 15; Rebs: Kiala 14; Asts: Domingos 5

Salle Omnisport de Radès, Radès
Referees: Aboulaye Kamagate (CIV), Tonton Banza Kalume (COD), Alioune Fall (SEN)

16 December 2017
11:15

Boxscore

Kano Pillars (Nigeria)	86–95	(Uganda) City Oilers
Scoring by quarter: 24–26, 24–28, 26–21, 12–20
Pts: Usman 27; Rebs: Yahaya 13; Asts: Usman, Yahaya 3		Pts: Opong 21; Rebs: Ndikumana, Tillman 6 Asts: Enabu 7

Salle Omnisport de Radès, Radès
Referees: Sofiane Si Youcef (ALG), Mbayi Christian Ntela (COD), Amir Taboubi (TUN)

16 December 2017
13:30

Boxscore

AS Salé (Morocco)	80–89	(Democratic Republic of the Congo) New Generation
Scoring by quarter: 22–20, 11–22, 34–22, 13–25
Pts: Munanga 18; Rebs: Baeri 6 Asts: El Mahsini 9		Pts: Kabongo 25; Rebs: Cathey Macklin 9 Asts: Kabongo 7

Salle Omnisport de Radès, Radès
Referees: Osvaldo Antonio Fernandes Quaresma Neto (ANG), Baker Mande Kyambadde (UGA), Opeyemi Oluwaseun Ogunleye (NGR)

16 December 2017
18:00

Boxscore

Étoile de Radès (Tunisia)	65–52	(Angola) Interclube
Scoring by quarter: 19–11, 9–12, 21–12, 16–17
Pts: Abada, Mathews 17; Rebs: Hadidane 9 Asts: Abada 7		Pts: Barros 13; Rebs: Kiala 6 Asts: Salvador, Uhegwu 3

Salle Omnisport de Radès, Radès
Referees: Wael Ibrahim Mohamed Mostafa (EGY), Alioune Fall (SEN), Aboulaye Kamagate (CIV), Amir Taboubi (TUN)

=== Group B ===
Pos	Team	Pld	W	L	PF	PA	PD	Pts	Qualification
1	(Tunisia) US Monastir	5	5	0	425	353	+72	10	Advance to quarterfinals
2	(Angola) Sport Libolo e Benfica	5	3	2	402	368	+34	8 (Note: Sport Libolo e Benfica 87-84 Groupement Sportif des Pétroliers)	Advance to quarterfinals
3	(Algeria) GS Pétroliers	5	3	2	475	428	+47	8	Advance to quarterfinals
4	(Mozambique) Ferroviário da Beira	5	2	3	366	395	−29	7	Advance to quarterfinals
5	(Democratic Republic of the Congo) Mazembe	5	1	4	363	408	−45	6 (Note: Gombe Bulls 47-67 ASB Mazembe)	Advance to 9th-12th Classification
6	(Nigeria) Gombe Bulls	5	1	4	319	398	−79	6	Advance to 9th-12th Classification

Source: FIBA Africa
Notes:

11 December 2017
11:15

Boxscore

Ferroviário da Beira (Mozambique)	80–104	(Algeria) GS Pétroliers
Scoring by quarter: 21–35, 25–26, 16–26, 18–17
Pts: Houana 24; Rebs: Houana 6 Asts: Nurmamade 2		Pts: Harat 20; Rebs: Harat 7 Asts: Benzegala 6

Salle Omnisport de Radès, Radès
Referees: Aboulaye Kamagate (CIV), Sameh Estafanous (EGY), Opeyemi Oluwaseun Ogunleye (NGR)

11 December 2017
15:45

Boxscore

Mazembe (Democratic Republic of the Congo)	65–90	(Angola) Sport Libolo e Benfica
Scoring by quarter: 18–24, 11–20, 16–23, 20–23
Pts: Manga 25; Rebs: Manga 10; Asts: Manga 4		Pts: Foster 21; Rebs: Dó 7 Asts: Barros, Bastos 3

Salle Omnisport de Radès, Radès
Referees: Hassane Kamate (CIV), Sami Belgharek (TUN), Baker Mande Kyambadde (UGA)

11 December 2017
20:15

Boxscore

Gombe Bulls (Nigeria)	62–90	(Tunisia) US Monastir
Scoring by quarter: 21–23, 11–24, 16–21, 14–22
Pts: Istifanus, Agu 14; Rebs: Njoku 6 Asts: Afuwape 3		Pts: Vinales 23; Rebs: Knioua, Shonganya 8 Asts: Knioua 10

Salle Omnisport de Radès, Radès
Referees: Aboulaye Kamagate (CIV), Sameh Estafanous (EGY), Osvaldo Antonio Fernandes Quaresma Neto (ANG)

12 December 2017
09:00

Boxscore

Sport Libolo e Benfica (Angola)	87–84	(Algeria) GS Pétroliers
Scoring by quarter: 12–27, 23–15, 28–24, 24–18
Pts: Cipriano 19; Rebs: Foster 7 Asts: Foster 3		Pts: Harat 25; Rebs: Harat 12; Asts: Benzegala 5

Salle Omnisport de Radès, Radès
Referees: Guy Sani Kollo (CMR), Alioune Fall (SEN), Mbayi Christian Ntela (COD)

12 December 2017
13:30

Boxscore

Ferroviário da Beira (Mozambique)	71–60	(Nigeria) Gombe Bulls
Scoring by quarter: 19–22, 24–15, 12–12, 16–11
Pts: Ubisse 16; Rebs: Ubisse 13; Asts: Nurmamade, Warner 3		Pts: David 13; Rebs: Ameh 7 Asts: 4 players 2

Salle Omnisport de Radès, Radès
Referees: Aboulaye Kamagate (CIV), Sami Belgharek (TUN), Baker Mande Kyambadde (UGA)

12 December 2017
15:45

Boxscore

Mazembe (Democratic Republic of the Congo)	67–91	(Tunisia) US Monastir
Scoring by quarter: 17–20, 21–17, 8–25, 21–29
Pts: Manga 15; Rebs: Manga 10; Asts: Maradi N'Sabar 2		Pts: Vinales 23; Rebs: Shonganya 11; Asts: Vinales 6

Salle Omnisport de Radès, Radès
Referees: Sameh Estafanous (EGY), Osvaldo Antonio Fernandes Quaresma Neto (ANG), Guy Sani Kollo (CMR)

13 December 2017
09:00

Boxscore

Mazembe (Democratic Republic of the Congo)	72–79	(Mozambique) Ferroviário da Beira
Scoring by quarter: 21–22, 16–26, 18–15, 17–16
Pts: Manga 27; Rebs: Kizubanata 8 Asts: Kizubanata 4		Pts: Ubisse, Warner 21; Rebs: Ubisse 8 Asts: Warner 4

Salle Omnisport de Radès, Radès
Referees: Mohamed Elmenshawy (EGY), Mohamed Belakhdar (MAR), Opeyemi Oluwaseun Ogunleye(NGR)

13 December 2017
13:30

Boxscore

GS Pétroliers (Algeria)	103–75	(Nigeria) Gombe Bulls
Scoring by quarter: 29–16, 27–18, 23–27, 24–14
Pts: Harat 26; Rebs: Harat 13; Asts: Belkhodja 5		Pts: Iduh 17; Rebs: Istifanus 11; Asts: Afuwape 2

Salle Omnisport de Radès, Radès
Referees: Sameh Estafanous (EGY), Osvaldo Antonio Fernandes Quaresma Neto (ANG), Baker Mande Kyambadde (UGA)

13 December 2017
15:45

Boxscore

Sport Libolo e Benfica (Angola)	72–77	(Tunisia) US Monastir
Scoring by quarter: 20–8, 20–25, 7–20, 25–24
Pts: Bastos 18; Rebs: Dó 10; Asts: Cipriano, Bastos 4		Pts: Vinales 28; Rebs: Shonganya 18; Asts: Jaziri 5

Salle Omnisport de Radès, Radès
Referees: Tonton Banza Kalume (COD), Alioune Fall (SEN), Guy Sani Kollo (CMR)

15 December 2017
11:15

Boxscore

Gombe Bulls (Nigeria)	75–67	(Angola) Sport Libolo e Benfica
Scoring by quarter: 26–23, 15–16, 14–17, 20–11
Pts: Istifanus 19; Rebs: Njoku 7 Asts: Afuwape, Gar, Istifanus 3		Pts: Cipriano 13; Rebs: Moore 8 Asts: Harris 4

Salle Omnisport de Radès, Radès
Referees: Sami Belgharek (TUN), Mohamed Belakhdar (MAR), Baker Mande Kyambadde (UGA)

15 December 2017
13:30

Boxscore

GS Pétroliers (Algeria)	101–92	(Democratic Republic of the Congo) Mazembe
Scoring by quarter: 27–21, 25–24, 28–29, 21–18
Pts: Harat 34; Rebs: Harat 11; Asts: Mostefat 7		Pts: Fula 25; Rebs: Maradi N'Sabar 7 Asts: Maradi N'Sabar 5

Salle Omnisport de Radès, Radès
Referees: Sameh Estafanous (EGY), Osvaldo Antonio Fernandes Quaresma Neto (ANG), Opeyemi Oluwaseun Ogunleye (NGR)

15 December 2017
15:45

Boxscore

US Monastir (Tunisia)	73–69	(Mozambique) Ferroviário da Beira
Scoring by quarter: 21–13, 20–9, 15–24, 17–23
Pts: Vinales 23; Rebs: Shonganya 13; Asts: Lahiani 5		Pts: Ivshyn 20; Rebs: Ubisse 14; Asts: Nurmamade 5

Salle Omnisport de Radès, Radès
Referees: Wael Ibrahim Mohamed Mostafa (EGY), Mbayi Christian Ntela (COD), Kingsley Ojeaburu (NGR)

16 December 2017
09:00

Boxscore

Gombe Bulls (Nigeria)	47–67	(Democratic Republic of the Congo) Mazembe
Scoring by quarter: 11–20, 7–14, 14–19, 15–14
Pts: David, Istifanus 11; Rebs: Gar 8 Asts: Gar 3		Pts: Fula 20; Rebs: Manga 16; Asts: A. Kasongo 3

Salle Omnisport de Radès, Radès
Referees: Guy Sani Kollo (CMR), Sameh Estafanous (EGY), Baker Mande Kyambadde (UGA)

16 December 2017
15:45

Boxscore

US Monastir (Tunisia)	94–83	(Algeria) GS Pétroliers
Scoring by quarter: 29–17, 21–26, 29–20, 15–20
Pts: Vinales 26; Rebs: Shonganya 10; Asts: Knioua 8		Pts: Harat 23; Rebs: Harat 7 Asts: Dekkiche 3

Salle Omnisport de Radès, Radès
Referees: Hassane Kamate (CIV), David Joao Domingos Manuel (ANG), Kingsley Ojeaburu (NGR)

16 December 2017
20:15

Boxscore

Sport Libolo e Benfica (Angola)	86–67	(Mozambique) Ferroviário da Beira
Scoring by quarter: 26–17, 19–14, 20–17, 21–19
Pts: Foster 21; Rebs: Dó 6 Asts: Foster 5		Pts: Machave 17; Rebs: Ivshyn 16; Asts: Warner 7

Salle Omnisport de Radès, Radès
Referees: Tonton Banza Kalume (COD), Mohamed Belakhdar (MAR), Mohamed Elmenshawy (EGY)

== Final round ==
=== 9th-12th Classification ===
9th-12th Place
18 December
(Nigeria) Gombe Bulls	67
(Nigeria) Kano Pillars	71
18 December
(Democratic Republic of the Congo) New Generation	62
(Democratic Republic of the Congo) Mazembe	82

9th place
19 December
(Nigeria) Kano Pillars	82
(Democratic Republic of the Congo) Mazembe	81
11th place
19 December
(Nigeria) Gombe Bulls	81
(Democratic Republic of the Congo) New Generation	69

18 December 2017
09:00

Boxscore

Gombe Bulls (Nigeria)	67–71	(Nigeria) Kano Pillars
Scoring by quarter: 21–18, 13–15, 15–10, 18–28
Pts: Istifanus, Agu 12; Rebs: Njoku 8 Asts: Yakubu 4		Pts: Usman 21; Rebs: Yahaya 11; Asts: Nwafor 2

Salle Omnisport de Radès, Radès
Referees: Mbayi Christian Ntela (COD), Mohamed Belakhdar (MAR), Osvaldo Antonio Fernandes Quaresma Neto (ANG)

18 December 2017
11:15

Boxscore

New Generation (Democratic Republic of the Congo)	62–82	(Democratic Republic of the Congo) Mazembe
Scoring by quarter: 11–23, 16–14, 14–28, 21–17
Pts: Kabongo 23; Rebs: Cathey Macklin, Isungu 10; Asts: Samuna, Kasongo Kasasa, Kabongo 2		Pts: Fula, Maradi N'Sabar 23; Rebs: A. Kasongo 13; Asts: Maradi N'Sabar 7

Salle Omnisport de Radès, Radès
Referees: Mohamed Elmenshawy (EGY), Baker Mande Kyambadde (UGA), Opeyemi Oluwaseun Ogunleye (NGR)

=== 11th Place ===
19 December 2017
09:00

Boxscore

Gombe Bulls (Nigeria)	81–69	(Democratic Republic of the Congo) New Generation
Scoring by quarter: 22–8, 20–24, 20–18, 19–19
Pts: Agu 19; Rebs: Gar 9 Asts: Afuwape 3		Pts: Kasongo Kasasa 21; Rebs: Isungu 7 Asts: Kabongo 4

Salle Omnisport de Radès, Radès
Referees: Alioune Fall (SEN), Osvaldo Antonio Fernandes Quaresma Neto (ANG), Baker Mande Kyambadde (UGA)

=== 9th Place ===
19 December 2017
11:15

Boxscore

Kano Pillars (Nigeria)	82–81	(Democratic Republic of the Congo) Mazembe
Scoring by quarter: 20–24, 21–22, 15–18, 26–17
Pts: Dike 27; Rebs: Yahaya 8 Asts: Yusuf 4		Pts: Manga 25; Rebs: Manga 13; Asts: Maradi N'Sabar 3

Salle Omnisport de Radès, Radès
Referees: Wael Ibrahim Mohamed Mostafa (EGY), Mohamed Belakhdar (MAR), Amir Taboubi (TUN)

=== RD3 ===
5th place game
B4	(Mozambique) Ferroviário da Beira	70
A4	(Uganda) City Oilers	82
7th place game
A3	(Angola) Interclube	96
B3	(Algeria) GS Pétroliers	91

5th–8th place semifinals
B4	(Mozambique) Ferroviário da Beira	76
A3	(Angola) Interclube	72
A4	(Uganda) City Oilers	87
B3	(Algeria) GS Pétroliers	81

Quarterfinals
B4	(Mozambique) Ferroviário da Beira	63
A1	(Morocco) AS Salé	92
B2	(Angola) Sport Libolo e Benfica	71
A3	(Angola) Interclube	65
A4	(Uganda) City Oilers	71
B1	(Tunisia) US Monastir	96
A2	(Tunisia) Étoile de Radès	89
B3	(Algeria) GS Pétroliers	87

Semifinals
A1	(Morocco) AS Salé	97
B2	(Angola) Sport Libolo e Benfica	86
B1	(Tunisia) US Monastir	69
A2	(Tunisia) Étoile de Radès	74

Final
A1	(Morocco) AS Salé	77
B1	(Tunisia) Étoile de Radès	69
Bronze medal game
B2	(Angola) Sport Libolo e Benfica	74
A2	(Tunisia) US Monastir	77

18 December 2017
13:30

Boxscore

Ferroviário da Beira (Mozambique)	63–92	(Morocco) AS Salé
Scoring by quarter: 15–25, 11–22, 13–30, 24–15
Pts: Houana 13; Rebs: Ubisse 8 Asts: Cossa 4		Pts: Najah 19; Rebs: Najah 12; Asts: El Mahsini 11

Salle Omnisport de Radès, Radès
Referees: Hassane Kamate (CIV), Sameh Estafanous (EGY), Amir Taboubi (TUN)

18 December 2017
15:45

Boxscore

Interclube (Angola)	65–71	(Angola) Sport Libolo e Benfica
Scoring by quarter: 19–25, 19–20, 10–18, 17–8
Pts: Barros 16; Rebs: 5 players 5 Asts: Domingos 3		Pts: Harris 4 Rebs: Foster, Bastos 10; Asts: Foster, Bastos 4

Salle Omnisport de Radès, Radès
Referees: Tonton Banza Kalume (COD), Sami Belgharek (TUN), Sofiane Si Youcef (ALG)

18 December 2017
18:00

Boxscore

GS Pétroliers (Algeria)	87–89	(Tunisia) Étoile de Radès
Scoring by quarter: 19–16, 25–26, 24–24, 19–23
Pts: Harat 34; Rebs: Harat 7 Asts: Dekkiche 6		Pts: Salisbery 26; Rebs: Mathews 12; Asts: Abada 8

Salle Omnisport de Radès, Radès
Referees: Wael Ibrahim Mohamed Mostafa (EGY), Alioune Fall (SEN), Kingsley Ojeaburu (NGR)

18 December 2017
20:15

Boxscore

City Oilers (Uganda)	71–96	(Tunisia) US Monastir
Scoring by quarter: 10–23, 9–25, 26–30, 26–18
Pts: Mayes 20; Rebs: Pegues 11; Asts: Mayes 3		Pts: Shonganya 27; Rebs: Shonganya 9 Asts: Vinales 7

Salle Omnisport de Radès, Radès
Referees: Aboulaye Kamagate (CIV), David Joao Domingos Manuel (ANG), Guy Sani Kollo (CMR)

=== 5th-8th Classification ===
19 December 2017
13:30

Boxscore

Ferroviário da Beira (Mozambique)	76–72	(Angola) Interclube
Scoring by quarter: 24–19, 27–6, 12–17, 13–30
Pts: Warner 20; Rebs: Ubisse 10; Asts: Warner 7		Pts: Santana 18; Rebs: Kiala 12; Asts: 5 players 2

Salle Omnisport de Radès, Radès
Referees: Sami Belgharek (TUN), Aboulaye Kamagate (CIV), Opeyemi Oluwaseun Ogunleye (NGR)

19 December 2017
15:45

Boxscore

City Oilers (Uganda)	87–81	(Algeria) GS Pétroliers
Scoring by quarter: 19–22, 17–14, 25–21, 26–24
Pts: Mayes 19; Rebs: Tillman 11; Asts: Mayes 3		Pts: Belkhodja 24; Rebs: Ghezzoul 17; Asts: Covington 3

Salle Omnisport de Radès, Radès
Referees: David Joao Domingos Manuel (ANG), Mohamed Elmenshawy (EGY), Mbayi Christian Ntela (COD)

=== Semifinals ===
19 December 2017
18:00

Boxscore

US Monastir (Tunisia)	69–74	(Tunisia) Étoile de Radès
Scoring by quarter: 20–15, 18–15, 12–24, 19–20
Pts: Vinales 22; Rebs: Shonganya 9 Asts: Vinales 6		Pts: Hadidane, Salisbery 15; Rebs: Hadidane 13; Asts: Abada 7

Salle Omnisport de Radès, Radès
Referees: Hassane Kamate (CIV), Tonton Banza Kalume (COD), Sofiane Si Youcef (ALG)

19 December 2017
20:15

Boxscore

AS Salé (Morocco)	97–86	(Angola) Sport Libolo e Benfica
Scoring by quarter: 21–23, 22–19, 24–16, 30–28
Pts: Zouita 29; Rebs: Najah 12; Asts: El Mahsini 10		Pts: Bastos 18; Rebs: Harris 7 Asts: Bastos 6

Salle Omnisport de Radès, Radès
Referees: Guy Sani Kollo (CMR), Sameh Estafanous (EGY), Alioune Fall (SEN)

=== 7th Place ===
20 December 2017
11:15

Boxscore

Interclube (Angola)	96–91	(Algeria) GS Pétroliers
Scoring by quarter: 29–27, 24–24, 25–23, 18–17
Pts: Ventura 24; Rebs: Ndjungu, Kiala 9 Asts: Domingos 9		Pts: Hamdini 30; Rebs: Adrar 5 Asts: Benzegala 8

Salle Omnisport de Radès, Radès
Referees: Mohamed Elmenshawy (EGY), Guy Sani Kollo (CMR), Amir Taboubi (TUN)

=== 5th Place ===
20 December 2017
13:30

Boxscore

Ferroviário da Beira (Mozambique)	70–82	(Uganda) City Oilers
Scoring by quarter: 13–27, 29–16, 13–21, 15–18
Pts: Nurmamade 28; Rebs: Ivshyn 8 Asts: Cossa 5		Pts: Opong, Pegues 23; Rebs: Pegues 8 Asts: Mayes, Ocitti 3

Salle Omnisport de Radès, Radès
Referees: Wael Ibrahim Mohamed Mostafa (EGY), Mohamed Belakhdar (MAR), Guy Sani Kollo (CMR)

=== 3rd Place ===
20 December 2017
15:45

Boxscore

Sport Libolo e Benfica (Angola)	74–77	(Tunisia) US Monastir
Scoring by quarter: 22–25, 22–20, 18–9, 12–23
Pts: Foster 16; Rebs: Mbunga, Harris, Foster 5 Asts: Harris, Foster 4		Pts: Shonganya 16; Rebs: Shonganya 8 Asts: Vinales 9

Salle Omnisport de Radès, Radès
Referees: Sameh Estafanous (EGY), Alioune Fall (SEN), Aboulaye Kamagate (CIV)

=== Final ===
20 December 2017
18:00

Boxscore

AS Salé (Morocco)	77–69	(Tunisia) Étoile de Radès
Scoring by quarter: 17–25, 17–20, 24–17, 19–7
Pts: Najah 16; Rebs: Najah 11; Asts: El Mahsini 7		Pts: Hadidane 21; Rebs: Hadidane 7 Asts: El Mabrouk 5

Salle Omnisport de Radès, Radès
Referees: Hassane Kamate (CIV), Tonton Banza Kalume (COD), Sofiane Si Youcef (ALG)

== Final ranking ==
Rank	Team	Record
1st place, gold medalist(s)	(Morocco) AS Salé	7–1
2nd place, silver medalist(s)	(Tunisia) Étoile de Radès	6–2
3rd place, bronze medalist(s)	(Tunisia) US Monastir	7–1
4th	(Angola) Sport Libolo e Benfica	4–4
5th	(Uganda) City Oilers	4–4
6th	(Mozambique) Ferroviário da Beira	3–5
7th	(Angola) Interclube	4–4
8th	(Algeria) GS Pétroliers	3–5
9th	(Nigeria) Kano Pillars	3–4
10th	(Democratic Republic of the Congo) Mazembe	2–5
11th	(Nigeria) Gombe Bulls	2–5
12th	(Democratic Republic of the Congo) New Generation	1–6

== Awards ==
2017 FIBA Africa Champions Cup

Association Sportive de Salé
1st title

Most Valuable Player
(Morocco) Abdelhakim Zouita

=== All-Star Five ===
Pos	Player	Club
F	(Morocco) Abdelhakim Zouita (MVP)	(Morocco) AS Salé
F	(Morocco) Abderrahim Najah	(Morocco) AS Salé
F	(Algeria) Mohamed Harat	(Algeria) GS Pétroliers
C	(Democratic Republic of the Congo) Evariste Shonganya	(Tunisia) US Monastir
G	(Tunisia) Omar Abada	(Tunisia) Étoile de Radès

== Statistics ==
Statistics as of the ending of the season, including knock-out and classification games.

=== Individual statistical leaders ===
Category	Player	Team(s)	Statistic
Efficiency per game	Mohamed Harat	GS Petroliers	24.8
Points per game	Mohamed Harat	GS Petroliers	24.2
Rebounds per game	Evariste Shonganya	US Monastir	10.8
Assists per game	Yassine El Mahsini	AS Salé	7.8
Steals per game	Angelo Warner	Ferroviário da Beira	2.6
Blocks per game	Pitchou Kambuy Manga	Mazembe	2.1
Blocks per game	Averon Matthews	ES Radès	2.1
Turnovers per game	Fabrice Maradi N'Sabar	Mazembe	4.9
Minutes per game	Helton Ubisse	Ferroviário da Beira	33.6
FG%	Abdelhakim Zouita	AS Salé	67.2%
3P%	Amine Rzig	ES Radès	58.8%
Double-doubles	Pitchou Kambuy Manga	Mazembe	5

=== Individual game highs ===
Category	Player	Team(s)	Statistic
Efficiency	Mohamed Harat	GS Petroliers	39
Points	Mohamed Harat	GS Petroliers	34 (twice)
Rebounds	Evariste Shonganya	US Monastir	18
Assists	Yassine El Mahsini	AS Salé	11
Assists	Kalenda Kabongo	New Generation	11
Steals	Micheal Afuwape	Gombe Bulls	6
Blocks	Pitchou Kambuy Manga	Mazembe	5 (twice)
Turnovers	6 players		7
2-point field goals	Mohamed Harat	GS Petroliers	13
3-point field goals	Wayne Arnold	AS Salé	8
