= List of BAL records =

Records of the Basketball Africa League

This article lists all-time records achieved in the Basketball Africa League (BAL) in major statistical categories recognised by the league, including those set by teams and individuals in a game, season, and career.

== General performances ==
=== By club ===
A total of five clubs have won the BAL since its inaugural season. Petro de Luanda holds the record for most finals appearances with three.

Performances in the Basketball Africa League (BAL) by club
Club	Titles	Runners-up	Years won	Years runners-up
(Angola) Petro de Luanda	1	3	2024	2022, 2025, 2026
(Tunisia) US Monastir	1	1	2022	2021
(Rwanda) RSSB Tigers	1	0	2026	—
(Libya) Al Ahli Tripoli	1	0	2025	—
(Egypt) Al Ahly	1	0	2023	—
(Egypt) Zamalek	1	0	2021	—
(Senegal) AS Douanes	0	1	—	2023
(Libya) Al Ahly Ly	0	1	—	2024

=== By nation ===
Clubs from four countries have reached the BAL final thus far. Egyptian clubs have been most successful as two titles were won, one each by Al Ahly and Zamalek.

Nation	Winners	Runners-up	Winning clubs	Runners-up
Egypt	2	0	Al Ahly (1); Zamalek (1)	—
Angola	1	2	Petro de Luanda (1)	Petro de Luanda (2)
(Tunisia Basketball Federation) Tunisia	1	1	US Monastir (1)	US Monastir (1)
Libya	1	1	Al Ahli Tripoli (1)	Al Ahly Ly (1)
Rwanda	1	0	RSSB Tigers (1)	—
Senegal	0	1	—	AS Douanes (1)

=== All-time club rankings ===
Teams are ranked by their number of wins in the BAL (updated after the 2026 season).

Rank	Club	Years	Pld	W	L	QF	4th	3rd	RU	W
1	(Angola) Petro de Luanda	6	49	33	16	–	1	1	3	1
2	(Tunisia) US Monastir	5	35	24	11	2	–	–	1	1
3	(Egypt) Al Ahly	3	25	17	8	1	1	–	–	1
4	(Egypt) Zamalek	2	14	13	1	–	–	1	–	1
5	(Libya) Al Ahly Ly	2	19	12	7	–	–	1	1	–
6	(Nigeria) Rivers Hoopers	3	21	11	10	1	–	1	–	–
7	(Morocco) FUS Rabat	3	21	10	11	3	–	–	–	–
8	(Senegal) AS Douanes	3	20	10	10	2	–	–	1	–
9	(Libya) Al Ahli Tripoli	1	10	9	1	–	–	–	–	1
10	(Rwanda) APR	2	16	8	8	–	–	1	–	–
11	(Egypt) Al Ittihad Alexandria	1	10	8	2	–	1	–	–	–
12	(Rwanda) REG	2	12	7	5	2	–	–	–	–
13	(Rwanda) RSSB Tigers	1	9	7	2	–	–	–	–	1
14	(South Africa) Cape Town Tigers	3	21	6	15	2	1	–	–	–
15	(Senegal) ASCVD	2	13	6	7	1	–	–	–	–
16	(Morocco) AS Salé	2	10	5	5	2	–	–	–	–
17	(Mali) Stade Malien	2	10	5	5	–	–	1	–	–
18	(Cameroon) FAP	2	12	4	8	1	1	–	–	–
19	(Cape Verde) Kriol Star	1	8	4	4	1	–	–	–	–
20	(Tunisia) Club Africain	1	7	4	3	1	–	–	–	–
21	(Kenya) Nairobi City Thunder	2	11	3	8	–	–	–	–	–
22	(Guinea) SLAC	2	11	3	8	1	–	–	–	–
23	(Mozambique) Ferroviário da Beira	2	11	3	9	1	–	–	–	–
24	(Tanzania) Dar City	1	7	3	4	1	–	–	–	–
25	(Central African Republic) Bangui SC	1	6	3	3	–	–	–	–	–
26	(Ivory Coast) ABC Fighters	1	6	3	3	1	–	–	–	–
27	(Rwanda) Patriots	1	6	3	3	–	1	–	–	–
28	(South Africa) MBB	1	6	2	4	–	–	–	–	–
29	(Uganda) City Oilers	1	5	1	4	–	–	–	–	–
30	(Mozambique) Ferroviário de Maputo	1	4	2	2	1	–	–	–	–
31	(Democratic Republic of the Congo) Espoir Fukash	1	5	1	4	–	–	–	–	–
32	(South Sudan) Cobra Sport	1	5	1	4	–	–	–	–	–
33	(Nigeria) Maktown Flyers	1	5	1	4	–	–	–	–	–
34	(Senegal) DUC	1	5	1	4	–	–	–	–	–
35	(Burundi) Dynamo	1	1	1	0	–	–	–	–	–
36	(Mali) AS Police	1	3	0	3	–	–	–	–	–
37	(Algeria) GS Pétroliers	1	3	0	3	–	–	–	–	–
38	(Madagascar) GNBC	1	3	0	3	–	–	–	–	–
39	(Ivory Coast) JCA Kings	1	5	0	5	–	–	–	–	–
40	(South Africa) Johannesburg Giants	1	5	0	5	–	–	–	–	–
41	(Nigeria) Kwara Falcons	1	5	0	5	–	–	–	–	–

=== Number of participating clubs ===
A total of 41 different clubs from 24 associations have played in or have qualified for the BAL main tournament. Seasons in bold represents teams qualified for the playoffs in that season.

Country	No.	Club	Seasons
Mozambique (2)	2	Ferroviário da Beira	2022, **2023**
Mozambique (2)	1	Ferroviário de Maputo	**2021**
Rwanda (4)	2	REG	**2022**, **2023**
Rwanda (4)	2	APR	2024, 2025
Rwanda (4)	1	Patriots	**2021**
Rwanda (4)	1	RSSB Tigers	**2026**
Senegal (3)	3	AS Douanes	**2021**, **2023**, 2024
Senegal (3)	2	ASC Ville de Dakar	2025, **2026**
Senegal (3)	1	DUC	2022
Egypt (3)	3	Al Ahly	**2023**, 2024, **2026**
Egypt (3)	2	Zamalek	**2021**, **2022**
Egypt (3)	1	Al Ittihad Alexandria	**2025**
Mali (2)	2	Stade Malien	**2023**, **2025**
Mali (2)	1	AS Police	2021
Nigeria (3)	3	Rivers Hoopers	2021, **2024**, **2025**
Nigeria (3)	1	Kwara Falcons	2023
Nigeria (3)	1	Maktown Flyers	2026
Cameroon (1)	1	FAP	**2021**, **2022**
Angola (1)	6	Petro de Luanda	**2021**, **2022**, **2023**, **2024**, **2025**, **2026**
Morocco (2)	3	FUS Rabat	**2024**, **2025**, **2026**
Morocco (2)	2	AS Salé	**2021**, **2022**
Tunisia (2)	5	US Monastir	**2021**, **2022**, 2023, **2024**, **2025**
Tunisia (2)	1	Club Africain	**2026**
Guinea (1)	2	SLAC	**2022**, 2023
South Africa (3)	3	Cape Town Tigers	**2022**, **2023**, **2024**
South Africa (3)	1	MBB	2025
South Africa (3)	1	Johannesburg Giants	2026
Algeria (1)	1	MC Alger (Note: MC Alger played in the 2021 season under its former name GS Pétroliers.)	2021
(Democratic Republic of the Congo) DR Congo (1)	1	Espoir Fukash	2022
Madagascar (1)	1	GNBC	2021
Ivory Coast (2)	1	ABC Fighters	**2023**
Ivory Coast (2)	1	JCA Kings	2026
Uganda (1)	2	City Oilers	2023, 2024
South Sudan (1)	1	Cobra Sport	2022
Burundi (1)	1	Dynamo	2024
Libya (2)	2	Al Ahly Benghazi	**2024**, **2026**
Libya (2)	1	Al Ahli Tripoli	2025
Central African Republic (1)	1	Bangui Sporting Club	2024
Kenya (1)	2	Nairobi City Thunder	2025, 2026
Cape Verde (1)	1	Kriol Star	2025
Tanzania (1)	1	Dar City	**2026**

=== Semi-final appearances by club ===
Years in bold denote years in which the team reached the BAL finals.

Team	No.	Years
(Angola) Petro de Luanda	6	2021, **2022,** 2023, **2024**, 2025, **2026**
(Egypt) Al Ahly	2	**2023**, 2026
(Libya) Al Ahly Ly	2	**2024**, 2026
(Tunisia) US Monastir	2	2021, **2022**
(Egypt) Zamalek	2	**2021**, 2022
(Rwanda) Patriots	1	2021
(Cameroon) FAP	1	2022
(Senegal) AS Douanes	1	**2023**
(Mali) Stade Malien	1	2023
(Nigeria) Rivers Hoopers	1	2024
(South Africa) Cape Town Tigers	1	2024
(Libya) Al Ahli Tripoli	1	**2025**
(Rwanda) APR	1	2025
(Egypt) Al Ittihad Alexandria	1	2025
(Rwanda) RSSB Tigers	1	**2026**

=== Medals by nation ===
Rank	Nation	Gold	Silver	Bronze	Total
1	Egypt	2	0	1	3
2	Angola	1	3	1	5
3	Libya	1	1	1	3
4	Tunisia	1	1	0	2
5	Rwanda	1	0	1	2
6	Senegal	0	1	1	2
7	Mali	0	0	1	1
7	Nigeria	0	0	1	1
Totals (8 entries)		**6**	**6**	**7**	**19**

=== Winning other trophies ===
Although not an officially recognised achievement, two clubs have achieved the distinction of winning the BAL, their domestic championship, and their primary domestic cup competition in the same season, known colloquially as the "continental treble":

- Al Ahly in 2023, having won the 2022–23 Egyptian Basketball Premier League and the 2022–23 Egyptian Cup
- US Monastir in 2022, having won the 2021–22 Championnat Pro A and 2021–22 Tunisian Cup

== All-time scoring leaders ==
Updated as of 13 June 2026.

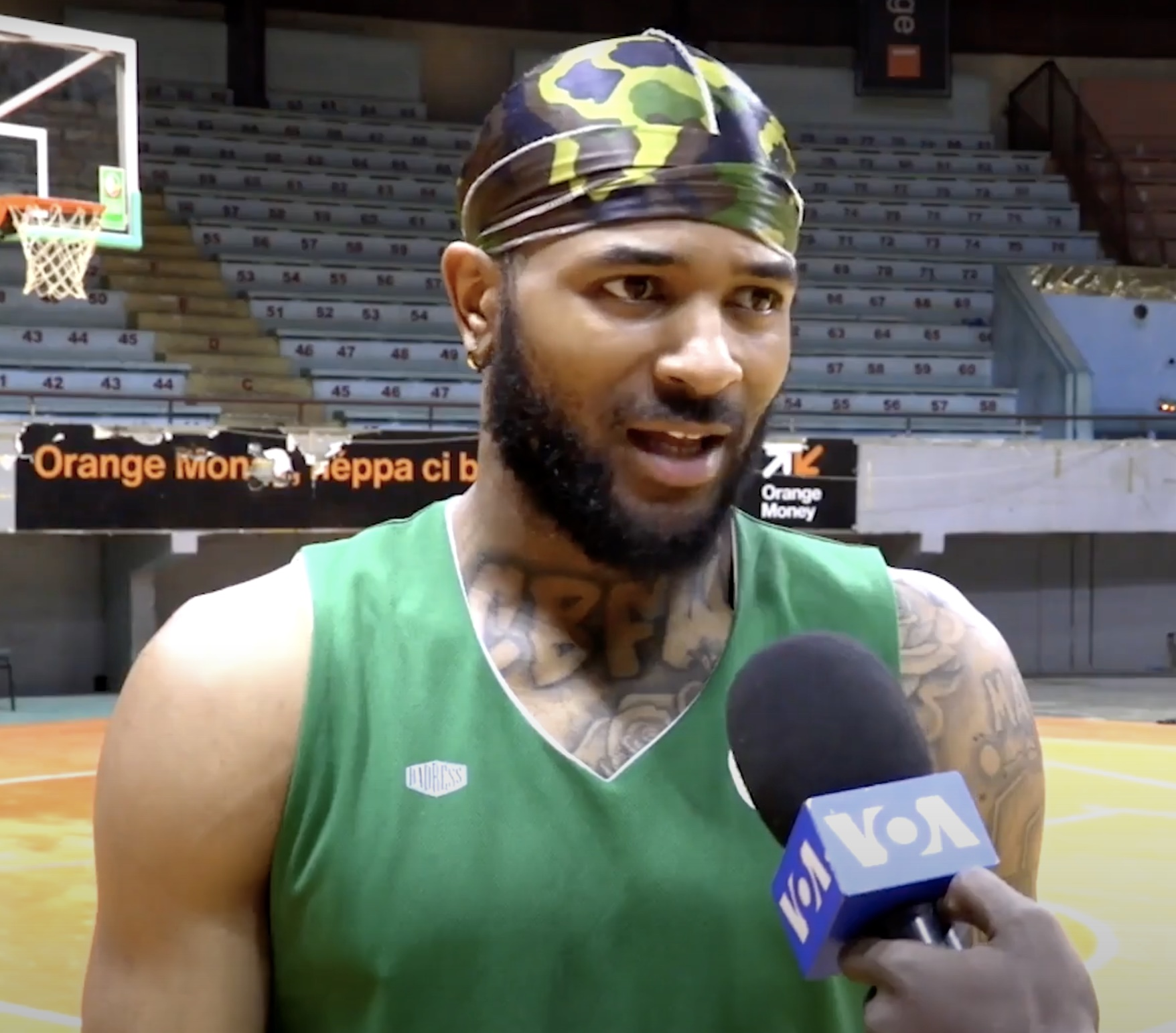
Chris Crawford is the current career scoring leader

Chris Crawford is the current all-time leading scorer in BAL history, with a total of 547 points scored. Players in bold are still active in the BAL.

Rank	Team	Total points	Seasons
1	**(United States) Chris Crawford**	547	5
2	**(Niger) Abdoulaye Harouna**	514	6
3	**(Angola) Childe Dundão**	509	6
4	**(United States) Will Perry**	496	5
5	**(South Sudan) Majok Deng**	473	3

== Individual game records ==
- **Most points in a game**

- 54 by Craig Randall II, RSSB Tigers (vs. Dar City) on April 4, 2026

- **Most rebounds in a game**

- 25 by Nkosinathi Sibanyoni, Cobra Sport (vs. Zamalek) on May 26, 2024

- **Most assists in a game**

- 18 by Damion Baugh, Al Ahly Ly (vs. Dar City) 118–97 on April 1, 2026

- **Most steals in a game**

- 8 by Mark Lyons, Al Ahly (vs. Al Ahly Ly) on April 26, 2024

- **Most blocks in a game**

- 8 by Aliou Diarra, APR (vs. Nairobi City Thunder) on May 26, 2025

- **Most 2-point field goals made in a game**

- 20 by Jo Lual-Acuil, Al-Ahly Ly (vs. City Oilers) on April 27, 2024

- **Most 3-point field goals made in a game**

- 11 by Craig Randall II, RSSB Tigers (vs. Dar City) on April 4, 2026

- **Most free throws made in a game**

- 17 by Obadiah Noel, APR (vs. Rivers Hoopers) on May 5, 2024

- **Highest efficiency in a game**
  - 43 by Deon Thompson, Al Ahli Tripoli (vs. Nairobi City Thunder) on May 18, 2025
- **Most minutes played in a game**
  - 45 by Anderson Correia, Kriol Star (vs. Petro de Luanda) on May 4, 2025

== Individual season records ==
- **Highest points per game average**

- 36.1 by Craig Randall II (RSSB Tigers), 2026

- **Highest rebounds per game average**

- 14.6 by Mangok Mathiang (RSSB Tigers), 2026

- **Highest assists per game average**

- 10.0 by Damion Baugh (Al Ahly Ly), 2026

== Team game records ==
- **Most points in a game by a team**

- 123 by APR (vs. Al Ittihad) 123–90 on June 13, 2025

- **Most points in a half by a team**
  - 74 points by APR (vs. Al Ittihad) 123–90 on June 13, 2025
- **Most points in a first quarter by a team**
  - 38 points by APR (vs. Al Ittihad) 123–90 on June 13, 2025
- **Most points scored in a game by both teams**
  - 215 points in Al Ahly Ly vs. Dar City on March 31, 2026
- **Fewest points in a game**

- 46 by Patriots (vs. US Monastir) on May 29, 2021

- **Largest margin of victory**

- 47 – US Monastir defeated GNBC 66–113 on May 17, 2021

- **Most 3-point field goals made in a game**

- 26 by APR (vs. Al Ittihad) 123–90 on June 13, 2025

- **Largest second half comeback**
  - 21 points by Espoir Fukash (vs. Cape Town Tigers) 96–92 on April 19, 2022

=== Playoffs ===
- **Largest margin of playoff victory**

- 41 – US Monastir defeated Patriots BBC 87–46 on May 29, 2021 in the semifinals

- **Largest second half playoff comeback**
  - 20 points by Petro de Luanda (vs. AS Douanes) 66–65 on May 27, 2024

== Team season records ==
- **Best record, by winning percentage**

- 6–0 (100%) by Zamalek in the 2021 season

- **Best record, by wins**

- 9–1 (90%) by Al Ahli Tripoli in the 2025 season

== Individual player records ==
- **Tallest player**
  - David Craig of MBB, 7 ft 3 in (2.21 m)
