= 2021 NBBF Premier League =

20th season of the Nigerian Basketball Premier League

- Association: Nigerian Ministry of Youth and Sports
- League: Nigerian Premier League
- Sport: Basketball

League stage

Final 8
- Finals champions: Rivers Hoopers (4th title)
- Runners-up: Gombe Bulls
- Finals MVP: Victor Anthony Koko (Rivers Hoopers)

Seasons
- ← 2019 2022 →

The 2021 NBBF Premier League was the 20th season of the Nigerian Premier League, the top division of basketball in Nigeria. While normally the league is organised by the Nigerian Basketball Federation (NBBF), this season was held by the Nigerian Ministry of Youth and Sports.

Rivers Hoopers won their fourth national championship after defeating Gombe Bulls in the final. As such, they qualified directly for the 2022 BAL season. However, as the league was not organised by the national federation, Nigeria's place was retracted by the BAL.

== Final 8 ==
The Final 8 was played in the 3,000-capacity Abuja Sports Hall in Abuja.

Semi-finals
15 November
Rivers Hoopers	85
Nigeria Customs	76
15 November
Gombe Bulls	79
Kano Pillars	67

Final
16 November
Rivers Hoopers	75
Gombe Bulls	57

== Individual awards ==
- Most Valuable Player: Johnson Anaiye (Rivers Hoopers)
- Final MVP: Victor Anthony Koko (Rivers Hoopers)
- Best Five:
  - Owen Oriakhi (Rivers Hoopers)
  - Ben Akhutie (Customs)
  - Michael Lordprince (Kwara Falcons)
  - Wisdom Anyaoha (Gombe Bulls)
  - Johnson Anaiye (Rivers Hoopers)
- Top Scorer: Owen Oriakhi (Rivers Hoopers)
