= Crown Elite Basketball Championship =

Crown Elite Basketball League
- Organising body: Crown Elite Sports
- Founded: 2021
- First season: 2021
- Countries: Nigeria
- Regions: West Africa
- Number of teams: 8
- Related competitions: Nigerian Premier League
- Current champions: Men: Rivers Hoopers (1st title); Women: First Bank (1st title) (2022)
- Most championships: Rivers Hoopers; Ebun Comets (1 title each)
- CEO: Hanson O. Oguche

The Crown Elite Basketball Championship is a professional basketball league for men's and women's teams in Nigeria and Western Africa. It is founded and organised by the Crown Elite Sports, a sports management company. The organization is affiliated with the Nigeria Basketball Federation (NBBF) and the Nigerian University Games Association. The first season was played in 2020.

== Men ==
The inaugural season was held on July 13 and July 14, 2021, in the indoor hall of the National Stadium in Lagos. The Ebun Comets won the inaugural title. The second season was held from February 1 to February 6, 2022, when the Rivers Hoopers won the second men's title and claimed the ₦ 1.5 million prize money.

=== List of champions ===
Edition	Season	Champions	Final score	Runners-up	Third place	Fourth place
1	2021	Ebun Comets	58–52	Lagos Legends		
2	2022	Rivers Hoopers	79–71	University of Lagos	Lagos Legends	Lagos Islanders

=== 2022 season ===
Group A

Team	W	L
Lagos Islanders	2	1
University of Lagos	2	1
Kwara Falcons	1	2
Ebun Comets	1	2

Group B

Team	W	L
Rivers Hoopers	2	1
Lagos Legends	2	1
Raptors	1	2
Dodan Warriors	0	3

Final Four

Semifinals
1	Lagos Islanders	49
4	Rivers Hoopers	64
3	Lagos Legends	53
2	University of Lagos	64

Finals
Rivers Hoopers	79
University of Lagos	74
Third place
Lagos Legends	75
Lagos Islanders	40

== Women ==
From August 21, to August 27, 2022, the first women competition was held. The tournament existed of six Nigerian teams, one team from Togo, and one team from Ghana.

=== List of champions ===
Edition	Season	Champions	Final score	Runners-up
3	2022	First Bank	44–27	Mountain of Fire Miracles
