= Azuoma Dike =

Nigerian basketball player (born 1989)

No. 4 – Kano Pillars
- Position: Point guard
- League: Nigerian Premier League

Personal information
- Born: 7 December 1989 (age 36) Amuzari, Imo State, Nigeria
- Listed height: 6 ft 0 in (1.83 m)

Career information
- Playing career: 2006–present

Career history
- 2006–2009: Union Bank
- 2009: Lagos Islanders
- 2010: Union Bank
- 2011–2012: Royal Hoopers
- 2013: Dodan Warriors
- 2014–2015: Mark Mentors
- 2015: Abidjan Ramblers
- 2017–present: Kano Pillars

Career highlights
- 4× NPL champion (2011, 2012, 2015, 2017); 2× NPL Most Valuable Player (2012, 2013); NPL scoring champion (2013)
Medals
Men's basketball
Representing Nigeria
AfroBasket
Silver medal – second place	2017 Tunisia/Senegal

Azuoma Dike (born 7 December 1989) is a Nigerian basketball player for Kano Pillars and the Nigerian national team. An established name in the Nigerian Premier League, Dike is a four-time champion and two-time MVP.

== Early life ==
Born in Amuzari, Ehime Mbano in the Imo State, in a sport-loving family and was the fourth of seven kids. His family originates from Ajegunle. Dike first played table tennis and football before switching to basketball.

== Club career ==
Dike began his senior club career in 2006 with Union Bank in the Nigerian Premier League (NPL). He joined the Lagos Islanders in 2009, but returned to Union Bank after just one season. After this, Dike played with the Royal Hoopers and guided them to their 2011 and 2012 NPL championship.

The following season, in 2013, he played for Dodan Warriors and was the league's top scorer. Dike transferred to Mark Mentors and helped them to their first-ever championship in 2015. The same year, he played for Abidjan Ramblers from Ivory Coast in the African Basketball League and the Ivorian Basketball Championship. He won the ABL championship with the Ramblers.

He joined Kano Pillars in 2017, and won the NPL championship in his first year with the team.

== National team career ==
Dike made his debut for Nigeria junior team in the National Sports Festival in 2016, he was later called up for the Nigeria under-18 team.

With the Nigeria senior team, Dike participated at the AfroBasket 2017 and won a silver medal. He also played at FIBA AfroCan 2019. At the African Games, Dike won a gold medal in 2011 and a bronze medal in 2015.

== Personal ==
Dike is married and has a son who was born in Oklahoma.
