= BAL All-Defensive Team =

Basketball Africa League honour

The BAL All-Defensive Team is an annual Basketball Africa League (BAL) honor bestowed on the best defensive players in the league following every BAL season. The All-Defensive Team is composed of five players. The honour was introduced in the 2022 season, the second season of the league.

In the first two seasons only one team was announced, however, starting from 2024 there were two all-defensive teams.

== Key ==
^	Denotes players who are still active in the BAL
*	Elected to the Naismith Memorial Basketball Hall of Fame
Player (X)	Denotes the number of times the player has been selected
**Player** **(in bold text)**	Indicates the player who won the BAL Defensive Player of the Year in the same year
G	Guard
F	Forward
C	Center

== Selections ==
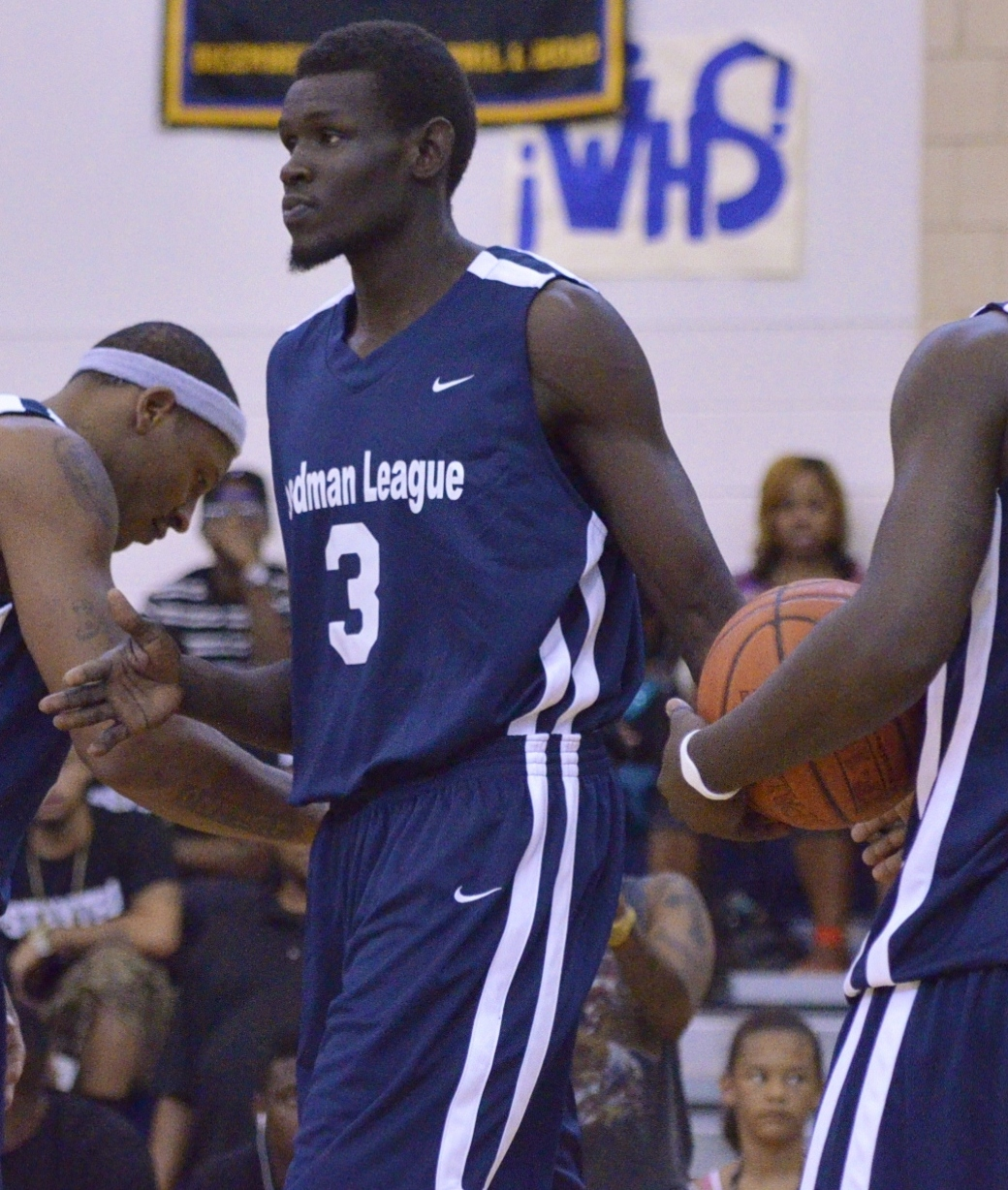
Ater Majok was selected to the All-Defensive Team in 2022 and 2023

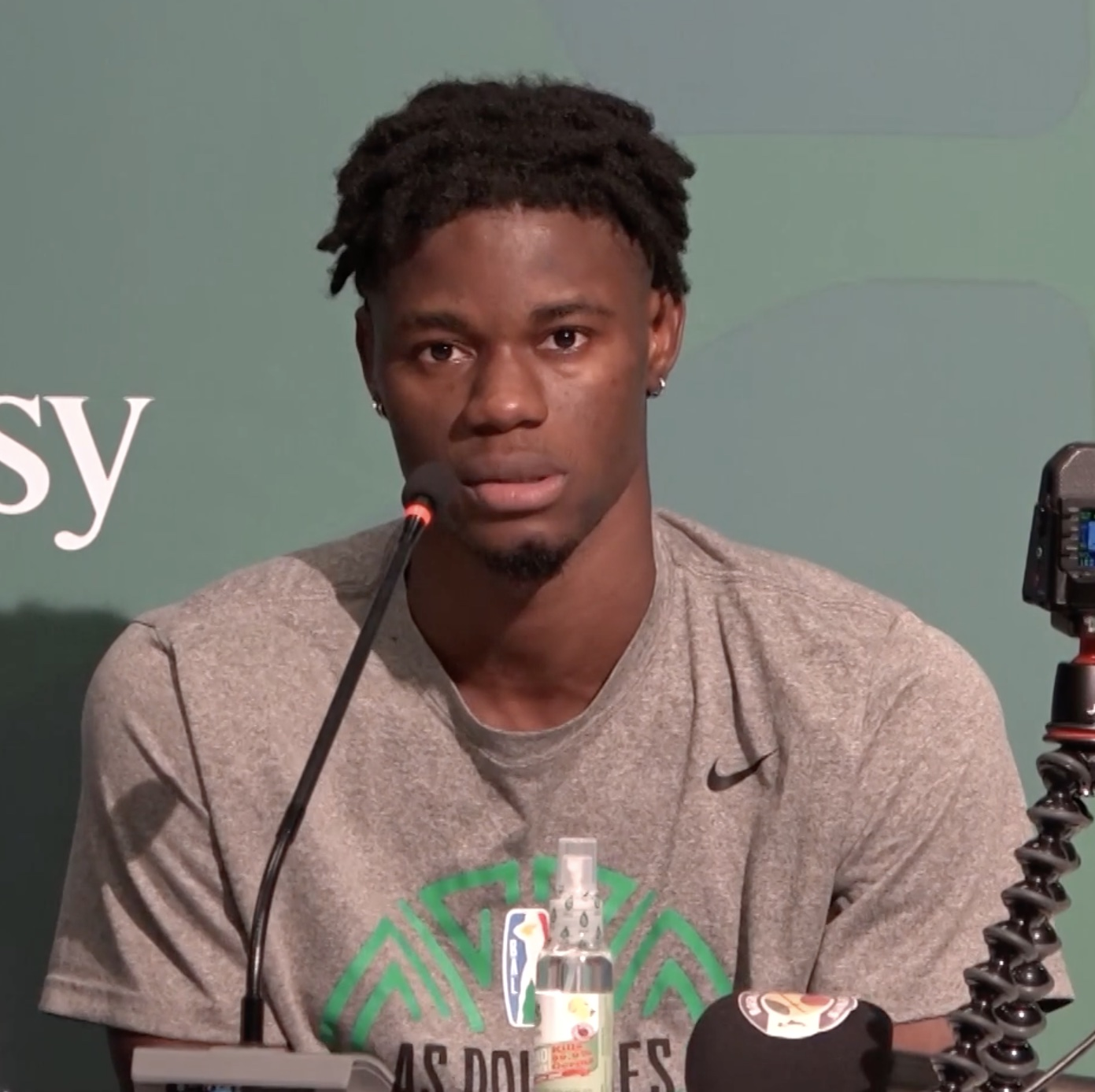
Jean Jacques Boissy made the team in 2023

=== 2022–2023 ===
Season	Pos.	Player	Team	Ref.
2022	G	Childe Dundão^	Petro de Luanda	
2022	G	Jean Jacques Nshobozwabyosenumukiza^	REG	
2022	F	Aboubakar Gakou^	Petro de Luanda	
2022	F	Brice Eyaga Bidias	FAP	
2022	C	**Ater Majok**^	US Monastir	
2023	G	Childe Dundão (2)^	Petro de Luanda	
2023	G	Jean Jacques Boissy^	AS Douanes	
2023	F	Samkelo Cele^	Cape Town Tigers	
2023	C	**Aliou Diarra^**	Stade Malien	
2023	C	Ater Majok (2)^	Petro de Luanda	

=== 2024–present ===
Season	First team		Second team		Ref.
Season	Player	Team	Player	Team	Ref.
2024	Solo Diabate^	Al Ahly Ly	Childe Dundão (3)^	Petro de Luanda	
2024	Abdoulaye Harouna^	AS Douanes	Jean Jacques Boissy (2)^	AS Douanes	
2024	Samkelo Cele^	Cape Town Tigers	Kelvin Amayo^	Rivers Hoopers	
2024	**Jo Lual-Acuil^**	Al Ahly Ly	Devine Eke^	Rivers Hoopers	
2024	Aliou Diarra (2)^	FUS Rabat	Ater Majok (3)^	US Monastir	
2025	Jean Jacques Boissy (3)^	Al Ahli Tripoli	Childe Dundão (4)^	Petro de Luanda	
2025	Obadiah Noel^	APR	Mohamed Sadi^	Al Ahli Tripoli	
2025	Taefale Lenard^	MBB	Ivan Almeida^	Kriol Star	
2025	Caleb Agada^	Al Ahli Tripoli	Majok Deng^	Al Ahli Tripoli	
2025	**Aliou Diarra (3)^**	APR	Youssoupha Ndoye^	APR	
2026	Childe Dundão (5)^	Petro de Luanda	David Michineau^	Dar City	
2026	Mohamed Sadi (2)^	Al Ahly Ly	Osayi Osifo^	Al Ahly	
2026	Aminu Mohammed^	Club Africain	Axel Toupane^	Ville de Dakar	
2026	Mouhamadou Diagne^	FUS Rabat	Majok Deng (2)^	Al Ahly Ly	
2026	**Mangok Mathiang^**	RSSB Tigers	Jo Lual-Acuil (2)^	Al Ahly Ly	

== Most selections ==
The following table lists the players with the most overall selections.

^	Denotes players who are still active in the BAL

Rank	Player	First team	Second team	Total	Defensive Player of the Year
1	Childe Dundão^	3	2	5	0
2	Aliou Diarra^	3	0	3	2
3	Ater Majok^	2	1	3	1
3	Jean Jacques Boissy^	2	1	3	0
5	Samkelo Cele^	2	0	2	0
5	Jo Lual-Acuil^	1	1	2	1
5	Mohamed Sadi	1	1	2	0
5	Majok Deng	0	2	2	0
