= Damion Baugh =

Congolese-American basketball player (born 2000)

- Baugh with Baskonia in 2026

No. 12 – Baskonia
- Position: Point guard
- League: Liga ACB; EuroLeague

Personal information
- Born: August 3, 2000 (age 26) Nashville, Tennessee, U.S.
- Listed height: 1.92 m (6 ft 4 in)
- Listed weight: 194 lb (88 kg)

Career information
- High school: Cane Ridge (Antioch, Tennessee); Lincoln Academy (Suwanee, Georgia); Tennessee Prep Academy (Memphis, Tennessee)
- College: Memphis (2019–2021); TCU (2021–2023)
- NBA draft: 2023: undrafted
- Playing career: 2023–present

Career history
- 2023–2024: South Bay Lakers
- 2024–2025: Westchester Knicks
- 2025: Charlotte Hornets
- 2025: →Greensboro Swarm
- 2025–2026: Valley Suns
- 2026: Al Ahly
- 2026: Calgary Surge
- 2026–present: Baskonia

Career highlights
- NBA G League steals leader (2026); Second-team All-Big 12 (2023)
- Stats at NBA.com
- Stats at Basketball Reference

Damion Baugh (born August 3, 2000) is a Congolese-American professional basketball player for Baskonia of the Liga ACB and the EuroLeague. He played college basketball for the Memphis Tigers and TCU Horned Frogs. He also holds dual citizenship in the United States and the Democratic Republic of the Congo, and represents the DR Congo men's national basketball team.

== Early life and high school career ==
Baugh attended Cane Ridge High School for two seasons before transferring to Lincoln Academy. For his senior season, he joined Tennessee Prep Academy. He averaged 23.5 points and 10 rebounds per game as a senior. Ranked the No. 86 prospect in his class by Rivals.com, Baugh committed to play college basketball at Memphis.

== College career ==
As a freshman, Baugh averaged 4.1 points, 3.6 rebounds, and 2.6 assists per game. He averaged 3.4 points, 2.6 rebounds and 1.9 assists per game as a sophomore. Following the season, Baugh transferred to TCU. Baugh averaged 10.6 points, 4.5 rebounds, and 4.5 assists per game as a junior. Following the season, he signed with an NBA certified agent, and served a six-game suspension. As a senior, Baugh averaged 12.6 points, 4.7 rebounds, and 5.8 assists per game, helping TCU reach the second round of the NCAA Tournament. He was named to the Second Team All-Big 12.

== Professional career ==
=== South Bay Lakers (2023–2024) ===
After going undrafted in the 2023 NBA draft, Baugh signed with the Los Angeles Lakers on September 7, 2023. However, he was waived on October 16 and twelve days later, he joined the South Bay Lakers.

=== Westchester Knicks (2024–2025) ===
On October 2, 2024, Baugh signed with the New York Knicks, but was waived on October 9. On October 28, he joined the Westchester Knicks.

=== Charlotte Hornets (2025) ===
On February 12, 2025, Baugh signed a two-way contract with the Charlotte Hornets. He made his NBA debut that day, logging 16 points, 5 rebounds, and 3 assists off the bench in a 102–86 loss to the Orlando Magic. Baugh made 15 appearances for Charlotte during the 2024–25 NBA season, averaging 7.3 points, 3.3 rebounds, and 3.7 assists.

=== Valley Suns (2025–2026) ===
On September 19, 2025, Baugh officially signed with the Phoenix Suns on an Exhibit 10 training camp contract. He was waived by the Suns on October 15. On November 7, Baugh was named to the Valley Suns opening night roster.

=== Al Ahly Ly (2026) ===
Baugh joined Libyan champions Al Ahly Ly for the Basketball Africa League (BAL). On April 1, 2026, he set a new all-time record for most assists in a game, when he dished out 18 assists in a 118–97 win over Dar City.

=== Calgary Surge (2026) ===
In June 2026, Baugh signed with the Calgary Surge of the Canadian Elite Basketball League (CEBL).

=== Baskonia (2026–present) ===
On August 6, 2026, Baugh signed with Baskonia of the Spanish Liga ACB and the EuroLeague.

== National team career ==
Despite being born in Nashville, Baugh represents the DR Congo men's national basketball team, and has dual nationality in the United States and the Democratic Republic of the Congo. At the 2027 FIBA Basketball World Cup qualification in Qatar, Baugh averaged 14.3 PPG, 3.3 RPG, and 6.7 APG in 3 games.

== Career statistics ==
Legend
GP	Games played	GS	Games started	MPG	Minutes per game
FG%	Field goal percentage	3P%	3-point field goal percentage	FT%	Free throw percentage
RPG	Rebounds per game	APG	Assists per game	SPG	Steals per game
BPG	Blocks per game	PPG	Points per game	**Bold**	Career high

=== NBA ===
Year	Team	GP	GS	MPG	FG%	3P%	FT%	RPG	APG	SPG	BPG	PPG
2024–25	Charlotte	15	2	24.7	.323	.214	.867	3.3	3.7	1.0	.1	7.3
Career		15	2	24.7	.323	.214	.867	3.3	3.7	1.0	.1	7.3
