= Yassine El Mahsini =

Belgian-Moroccan basketball player

No. 5 – AS Salé
- Position: Point guard
- League: Division Excellence

Personal information
- Born: 26 October 1993 (age 33)
- Listed height: 1.88 m (6 ft 2 in)

Career information
- Playing career: 2012–present

Career history
- 2012–2014: Oostende
- 2016–present: AS Salé

Career highlights
- FIBA Africa Clubs Champions Cup winner (2017); 4× Moroccan League champion (2016–2019, 2021); 3× Moroccan Cup winner (2016–2019)

Yassine El Mahsini (born 26 October 1993) is a Belgian-Moroccan basketball player who currently plays for AS Salé of the Division Excellence.

== Professional career ==
El Mahsini joined the senior team of BC Oostende in 2012, after playing in the junior ranks of the club previously. Over two seasons, he appeared in 9 games in the Pro Basketball League.

Since 2016, El Mahsini is a member of AS Salé.

== BAL career statistics ==
Legend
GP	Games played	GS	Games started	MPG	Minutes per game
FG%	Field goal percentage	3P%	3-point field goal percentage	FT%	Free throw percentage
RPG	Rebounds per game	APG	Assists per game	SPG	Steals per game
BPG	Blocks per game	PPG	Points per game	**Bold**	Career high

Year	Team	GP	GS	MPG	FG%	3P%	FT%	RPG	APG	SPG	BPG	PPG
2021	AS Salé	4	4	34.1	.304	.444	.400	5.5	5.0	1.8	.5	5.0
Career		4	4	34.1	.304	.444	.400	5.5	5.0	1.8	.5	5.0
