= 2025 NBBF Premier League =

- League: Nigerian Premier League
- Sport: Basketball
- Duration: 26 October – 3 November 2025 (Final Eight); 20–23 November 2025 (Final Four)
- Teams: 16

Conference Eight

Final Four

Seasons
- ← 2024 2026 →

The 2024 NBBF Premier League is the 24th season of the NBBF Premier League, the top-flight basketball league in Nigeria organized by the Nigeria Basketball Federation (NBBF). The season began on 25 October 2024 and ended 19 November 2024. The Final Eight began on 26 October and finished 3 November 2025, while the Final Four is from 20 November to 23 November 2025.

The Final Eight and Final Four are hosted in Port Harcourt for a third season in a row.

== Final Eight ==
Pos	Team	Pld	W	L	GF	GA	GD	Pts	
1	Lagos Legends	7	6	1	512	462	+50	13	Advance to Final Four
2	Rivers Hoopers	7	6	1	577	505	+72	13	Advance to Final Four
3	Gboko City Chiefs	7	5	2	515	478	+37	12	Advance to Final Four
4	Nigeria Customs	7	3	4	513	528	−15	10	Advance to Final Four
5	Nile University	7	3	4	476	537	−61	10	
6	Kano Pillars	7	3	4	426	433	−7	10	
7	Hoops & Read	7	2	5	430	442	−12	9	
8	Kwara Falcons	7	0	7	449	531	−82	7	

Source: 9ja Hoops
