= Devine Eke =

American-Nigerian basketball player (born 1996)

No. 23 – ASC Ville de Dakar
- Position: Small forward / power forward
- League: NM1; BAL

Personal information
- Born: July 28, 1996 (age 30) Plainfield, New Jersey, U.S.
- Listed height: 6 ft 8 in (2.03 m)
- Listed weight: 205 lb (93 kg)

Career information
- High school: Union Catholic Regional (Union County, New Jersey); The Robinson School (Irvington, New Jersey)
- College: Maine (2015–2016); Rider (2016–2019); Radford (2019–2020)
- NBA draft: 2020: undrafted
- Playing career: 2021–present

Career history
- 2021–2022: Palencia
- 2022: Académica de Coimbra
- 2023: Feyenoord
- 2023: Amyntas
- 2023: Sloboda Tuzla
- 2024: Rivers Hoopers
- 2024: Santa Cruz Warriors
- 2025: Delaware Blue Coats
- 2025: Mexico City Capitanes
- 2025: San Diego Clippers
- 2025–present: ASC Ville de Dakar

Career highlights
- All-BAL Second Team (2024); BAL All-Defensive Second Team (2024)

Devine Chukwuemeka Eke (born July 28, 1996) is an American-Nigerian basketball player for ASC Ville de Dakar of the Nationale 1 (NM1) and the Basketball Africa League (BAL). He played college basketball for the Maine Black Bears, the Rider Broncs and the Radford Highlanders.

== High school and college career ==
Raised in Plainfield, New Jersey, Eke played for Union Catholic Regional High School, where he led the team to the conference title, while also competing in track, After that, he competed for The Robinson School, where he averaged 21 points, 10 rebounds and 7 blocks per game, which earned him Jordan Brand Classic Regional Player honours.

He began his college career with Maine, and led the Black Bears in rebounds per game (6.8 per game), as well as in field goal percentage (.612) and blocks (1.6 per game). Eke transferred to Rider, where he sat out the first season due to NCAA transfer rules, before playing two full seasons with them. His last year in college basketball was with Radford, where he led the team in rebounds and blocks.

== Professional career ==
After gruadating, Eke initially struggled to find a professional team because of the COVID-19 pandemic. After having worked out with National Basketball Association (NBA) teams, among others the Chicago Bulls, he joined Palencia of the Spanish LEB Oro.

In January 2023, Eke joined Dutch club Feyenoord. He made his Feyenoord debut two months later after waiting for his working visa; he debuted on March 6, 2023, making 5 points in an away loss to Brussels.

In May 2024, Eke joined Nigerian team Rivers Hoopers of the Basketball Africa League (BAL). Eke played a key role in the Hoopers' third-place performance, and was named to the All-BAL Second Team. He averaged 16.6 points and 10.8 rebounds per game for the Hoopers.

Following his performance in the BAL, Eke joined the Milwaukee Bucks for the 2024 NBA Summer League and on October 26, 2024, he joined the Santa Cruz Warriors after being selected in the 2024 NBA G League draft. However, he was waived on December 2. On January 10, 2025, he joined the Delaware Blue Coats, but was waived that day after one game.

Eke joined ASC Ville de Dakar for the 2025 BAL season.

== National team career ==
Eke made his debut for the Nigeria national team in February 2024, during the FIBA AfroBasket 2025 qualifiers. He debuted on February 24, 2024, when he had 19 points, 6 rebounds and 7 assists in a loss to Uganda. On February 25, he scored 31 points in another loss to Cape Verde.

== Personal life ==
Eke is the son of Charles and Lilian Eke, and has four siblings. His cousins Chiney Ogwumike and Nneka Ogwumike are professional players in the Women's National Basketball Association (WNBA).

At Radford, he majored in radio and television.
