= Ahmadu Musa Kida =

Nigerian engineer and basketball player

Ahmadu Musa Kida is a Nigerian engineer and former basketball player. He hails from Borno State in Nigeria . He was the Deputy Managing Director, Deep Water Services, of Total Nigeria, and he is also the president of the Nigerian Basketball Federation.

== Education ==
Kida received his degree in civil engineering from Ahmadu Bello University, Zaria, in 1984. He obtained a postgraduate diploma in petroleum engineering from the Institut Francaise du Petrol (IFP) in Paris.

== Career ==
Kida started his career as a professional at ELF Petroleum Nigeria as a trainee engineer and materials coordinator. Mr Musa joined Total Exploration & Production Nigeria in 1985 and has worked for over 32 years' experience in the Oil and Gas industry. Mr Musa was appointed the Deputy Managing Director of TEPNG Deepwater District as well as on the Board member of Total Upstream Companies in Nigeria on August 1, 2015.

Kida became a member of the Total E&P Nigeria board in 2014 as executive director for the Port Harcourt district.

In August 2015, Kida was appointed as the deputy managing director of the Deepwater district in Lagos.

In 2024, Kida became Independent Non-Executive Director at Pan Ocean-Newcross Group.

== Membership ==
Musa attended several professional courses that includes the Massachusetts Institute of Technology and the Harvard Business School both in the USA.

He is a member of Society of Petroleum Engineers International, a chartered Fellow of the Nigerian Society of Engineers (NSE) as well as a registered Member of the Council for the Regulation of Engineering in Nigeria (COREN).

Mr Musa plays Basketball and is the current President of the Board of Nigerian Basketball Federation (NBBF)

== Nigerian Basketball Federation ==
Kida was elected president of the Nigerian Basketball Federation (NBBF) in June 2017.

== Personal life ==
Kida is married and has four children.
