= Kelvin Amayo =

Nigerian-Canadian basketball player

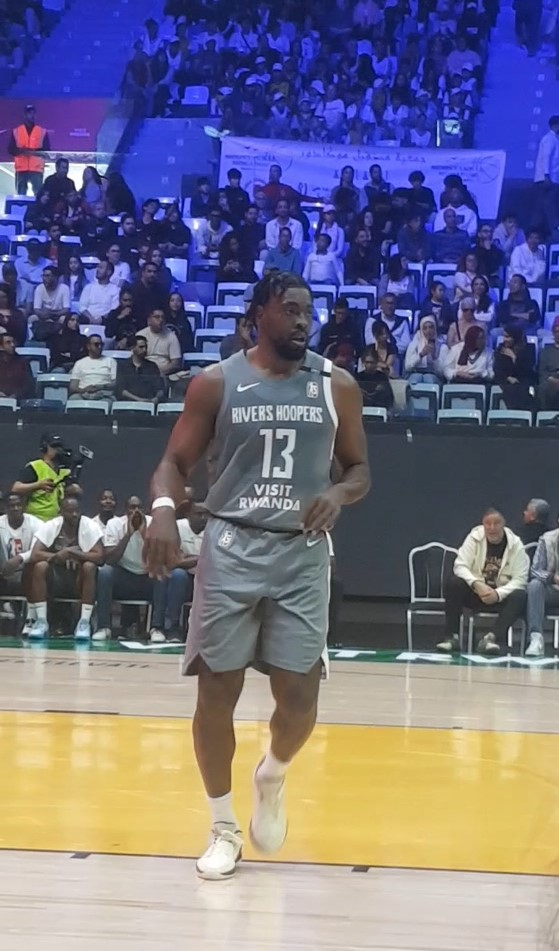
- Amayo during 2025 BAL season

No. 1 – Rivers Hoopers
- Position: Guard
- League: NPL; BAL

Personal information
- Born: 9 January 1992 (age 34) Montreal, Quebec, Canada
- Listed height: 6 ft 4 in (1.93 m)
- Listed weight: 225 lb (102 kg)

Career information
- High school: St. Benedict's Preparatory School (Newark, New Jersey)
- College: Marshall (2012–2013); Iona (2014–2016); Loyola Marymount (2016–2017)

Career history
- 2019: Abkhazeti Tbilisi
- 2019–2020: Toofarghan Azarshahr
- 2020–2021: Chemidor Tehran
- 2022: Sanaye Hormozgan
- 2023: Stade Malien
- 2024: Rivers Hoopers
- 2024: Dynamo
- 2024: Al Ahli Tripoli
- 2024–present: Rivers Hoopers

Career highlights
- All-BAL Second Team (2024); BAL All-Defensive Second Team (2024); NPL champion (2024); NPL MVP (2024)

Kelvin Nosa JR Amayo (born 9 January 1992) is a Nigerian-Canadian basketball player for the Rivers Hoopers of the Nigerian Premier League (NPL) and Basketball Africa League (BAL).

== High school and college career ==
Amayo was born in Montreal, Canada, to Nigerian parents Faith and Charles Amayo. Amayo played high school basketball with St. Benedict's Preparatory School in Newark, New Jersey, where he averaged 13 points, 4 rebounds and 5 assists per game. He transferred to NIA School, where he upped his statistics to 20 points, 6 rebounds and 5 assists per game, while leading NIA to the nation's number 6 among United States prep schools.

He enrolled in Marshall University in 2012, where he played for the Thundering Herd men's basketball team, appearing in three games before electing to transfer. He changed to Iona where he would sit out the 2013–14 season due to transfer rules. He played four games in his junior season before having a season-ending injury, causing him to miss the entire season, as well as the next 2015–16 season.

Amayo then transferred to the Loyola Marymount University where he made his debut for the Lions in the 2016–17 season, averaging 4.7 points and 3.8 rebounds for the team.

== Professional career ==
In the 2019–20 season, Amayo was on the roster of Toofarghan Azarshahr of the Iranian Basketball Super League. On 27 October 2020, Amayo signed a one-year contract with Chemidor Tehran. In the 2021–22 season, he played with Sanaye Hormozgan.

Amayo played in the 2023 BAL season with Malian club Stade Malien. He helped the team finish in third place,

In March 2024, Amayo joined Nigerian club Rivers Hoopers for the 2024 BAL season. The Hoopers finished in third place, the best result in team history. Amayo was named to the All-BAL Second Team and the All-Defensive Second Team.

In November 2024, he played for Al Ahli Tripoli in the Elite 16 of the 2025 BAL qualification, helping the team qualify. The same month, Amayo returned to the Rivers Hoopers, and helped them win the Nigerian Premier League (NPL) title, by scoring 29 points in the championship game against Hoops & Read. He was subsequently named the NPL Most Valuable Player.

== BAL career statistics ==
Legend
GP	Games played	GS	Games started	MPG	Minutes per game
FG%	Field goal percentage	3P%	3-point field goal percentage	FT%	Free throw percentage
RPG	Rebounds per game	APG	Assists per game	SPG	Steals per game
BPG	Blocks per game	PPG	Points per game	**Bold**	Career high

Year	Team	GP	GS	MPG	FG%	3P%	FT%	RPG	APG	SPG	BPG	PPG
2023	Stade Malien	8	4	26.3	**.385**	.143	**.278**	3.0	4.9	**2.3**	0.3	7.4
2024	Rivers Hoopers	**10**	**10**	**37.0**	.343	.227	**.391**	**5.3**	**6.7**	2.2	**0.5**	**16.0**
