= Raptors Basketball Academy =

Nigerian basketball team

Raptors
- Leagues: Nigerian Premier League
- Founded: 2001; 25 years ago
- History: Spiders; 2001–2006; Raptors Academy; 2006–present
- Arena: Indoor Sports Hall
- Capacity: 3,000
- Location: Lagos, Nigeria
- Main sponsor: Flour Mills of Nigeria
- President: Dipo Fagbemi
- Head coach: Charles Ibeziakor

Raptors Basketball Academy, better known as Raptors, is a Nigerian basketball team based in Lagos. It plays in the Nigerian Premier League.

The team was founded in 2001 by coach Charles Ibeziakor as Spiders. In 2006, he changed the name to Raptors as a reference to the Toronto Raptors. In the 2019 season, the Raptors made their debut in the Premier League. In its debut season, Raptors reached the final of the 2019 NBBF President Cup after beating Niger Potters in the semifinals. In the final, the team lost to Rivers Hoopers.

== Honours ==
Nigerian Premier League

- Runners-up (1): 2019

OBN Hoop Summit

- Winners (1): 2022

== Head coaches ==
- (Nigeria) Charles Ibeziakor (2001–now)
