= Osayi Osifo =

South African basketball player (born 2000)

No. 14 – Cedevita Olimpija
- Position: Power forward
- League: ABA League; EuroCup

Personal information
- Born: 6 April 2000 (age 26) Vereeniging, South Africa
- Listed height: 6 ft 9 in (2.06 m)
- Listed weight: 230 lb (104 kg)

Career information
- High school: Potchefstroom (Potchefstroom, South Africa); McKinney Boyd (McKinney, Texas, U.S.)
- College: EFSC (2018–2020); Florida (2020–2021); Jacksonville (2021–2023)
- NBA draft: 2023: undrafted
- Playing career: 2024–present

Career history
- 2024–2026: Austin Spurs
- 2025: Calgary Surge
- 2026: Al Ahly
- 2026–present: Cedevita Olimpija

Career highlights
- BAL All-Defensive Second Team (2026)
- Stats at NBA.com
- Stats at Basketball Reference

Osayimwen Olugbenga Benson Osifo (born 6 April 2000) is a South African professional basketball player who plays for Cedevita Olimpija in the ABA League and the EuroCup. He played college basketball in the United States for the ESFC Titans, Florida Gators, and Jacksonville Dolphins.

== Early life ==
Osifo was born in the Bedworth Park neighbourhood of Vereeniging, South Africa. His father is Nigerian and his mother is Zambian. Osifo attended Potchefstroom High School for Boys where he gained prominence as an athlete. He played rugby while growing up and made the national team. Osifo started playing basketball after he broke his finger while playing rugby and reconsidered his athletic path. Osifo moved to live with an uncle in McKinney, Texas, in 2016 shortly after he first started playing basketball. He attended McKinney Boyd High School.

== College career ==
Osifo received offers from NCAA Division III colleges during his senior year of high school and joined Eastern Florida State College. He evolved into a priority target for multiple high-major programs in 2019.

On 29 September 2019, Osifo signed with the Florida Gators to join them the following season. He averaged 1.9 points per game with the Gators during the 2020–21 season. On 26 March 2021, Osifo announced that he would enter the NCAA transfer portal.

Osifo followed Gators assistant coach Jordan Mincy to the Jacksonville Dolphins where Mincy was appointed as head coach. Osifo became a key contributor to the team and led the Dolphins in rebounding during his senior season.

== Professional career ==
In 2024, Osifo attended a local player tryout with the Austin Spurs of the NBA G League and made the team. He averaged 6.1 points and 6.7 rebounds during the 2024–25 season.

On 11 May 2025, Osifo signed with the Calgary Surge of the Canadian Elite Basketball League for the 2025 season.

Osifo joined the San Antonio Spurs of the National Basketball Association (NBA) for the 2025 NBA Summer League. On September 11, Osifo signed with the San Antonio Spurs. He was waived the following day. Osifo returned to the Austin Spurs for the 2025–26 season.

On 12 April 2026, Osifo signed with Al Ahly of the Egyptian Basketball Premier League and Basketball Africa League (BAL). He was selected to the BAL All-Defensive Second Team in 2026.

In July 2026 he was signed to the Denver Nuggets 2026 Summer League Roster.

== Career statistics ==
Legend
GP	Games played	GS	Games started	MPG	Minutes per game
FG%	Field goal percentage	3P%	3-point field goal percentage	FT%	Free throw percentage
RPG	Rebounds per game	APG	Assists per game	SPG	Steals per game
BPG	Blocks per game	PPG	Points per game	**Bold**	Career high

=== College ===
Year	Team	GP	GS	MPG	FG%	3P%	FT%	RPG	APG	SPG	BPG	PPG
2020–21	Florida	20	0	10.0	.556	-	.471	2.6	.4	.2	.1	1.9
2021–22	Jacksonville	**29**	**27**	20.7	**.622**	-	.681	**5.9**	.4	**.3**	**.3**	**7.9**
2022–23	Jacksonville	**29**	**27**	**24.1**	.526	**.375**	**.794**	5.7	**.7**	**.3**	**.3**	7.5
Career		78	54	19.2	.589	.375	.709	4.9	.5	.3	.3	6.2
