= Abdul Yahaya =

Nigerian basketball player (born 1990)

Free agent
- Position: Power forward

Personal information
- Born: 24 April 1990 (age 36) Jos, Nigeria
- Listed height: 6 ft 8 in (2.03 m)

Career history
- –2014: Kano Pillars
- 2014–2015: Mark Mentors
- 2015–2019: Kano Pillars
- 2019–2020: Rivers Hoopers
- 2020: Abidjan Basket Club

Career highlights
- 2× NPL champion (2015, 2019); 2× NPL Most Valuable Player (2015, 2019)
Medals
Men's basketball
Representing Nigeria
AfroBasket
| Silver medal – second place | 2017 Tunisia/Senegal |

Abdul Yahaya (born 24 April 1990) is a Nigerian professional basketball player who plays as a power forward. Standing at 6 ft 8 in (2.03 m), he has had a domestic and international career, winning the Nigerian Premier League MVP award twice.

== Professional career ==
=== Early Career ===
Yahaya started off in the Nigerian domestic league playing for Kano Pillars BC before transferring to Mark Mentors for the 2014–2015 season. In 2015, he led Mark Mentors to the Nigerian Premier League (NPL) title and emerged as the Most Valuable Player (MVP) of the competition.

He subsequently returned to Kano Pillars BC, leading the team during their continental campaigns. At the 2017 FIBA Africa Zone 3 Club Championship qualifiers in Lagos, Yahaya was named MVP, highest rebounder, and highest scorer as Kano Pillars claimed the title. At the 2017 FIBA Africa Champions Cup, he averaged 17.6 points and 8.6 rebounds per game.

=== Rivers Hoopers and International Moves ===
In February 2019, Yahaya signed a one-year deal with Rivers Hoopers ahead of the 2019 FIBA Africa Basketball League, where he averaged 16.7 points and 7 rebounds over three appearances. In November 2019, he led Hoopers to the NBBF President Cup title, earning his second MVP honor in the process.

On 20 April 2020, Yahaya transitioned to professional basketball outside Nigeria, signing with Abidjan Basket Club in the Ivorian National 1 League.

In recent years, he returned to the Nigerian domestic circuit. During the 2023 Nigerian Basketball Premier League season, he featured for Nigeria Customs, recording a 100% shooting performance in a Finals tournament match against his former club, Rivers Hoopers.

=== National team career ===
Yahaya featured for the Nigeria national basketball team, D'Tigers. He was a member of the squad that won the silver medal at the 2017 FIBA AfroBasket co-hosted by Tunisia and Senegal. He also represented Nigeria at the 2018 Commonwealth Games in Gold Coast, Australia.

At the 2019 FIBA AfroCan tournament, Yahaya featured averaging 13.3 points, 5.7 rebounds, and 3.3 assists per game.

=== 3x3 ===
In addition to traditional full-court basketball, Yahaya played the 3x3 format. As team captain, he led Nigeria to the gold medal at the inaugural FIBA 3x3 Africa Cup in Lomé, Togo, in 2017, scoring 39 points across five games. He subsequently represented Nigeria at the 2018 FIBA 3x3 World Cup in the Philippines.
