= Maktown Flyers =

- Leagues: Nigerian Premier League
- Founded: 2021 (as Lagos Legends); 2023 (as Maktown Flyers)
- History: Lagos Legends (2021–2025); Maktown Flyers (2023–present)
- Location: Lagos, Nigeria
- Head coach: Michael Ikima
- Championships: 1 (2025)

The Maktown Flyers, formerly known as Lagos Legends, are a Nigerian professional basketball team based in Lagos. The team plays in the Nigerian Premier League (NPL) and currently in the Basketball Africa League (BAL).

== History ==
The club was established as the Lagos Legends in 2021 by Benjamin Peter, a former NPL player and two-time NCAA basketball champion. The team entered the NBBF Division I in the 2021 season.

In 2023, a basketball academy Maktown Flyers Basketball Club was established by Akerannan Manasseh Achii, a native of Makurdi, Benue State. The name Maktown is derived from the nickname that is used for Makurdi, the founder's hometown. The academy had success in its early years, as in 2024 two student-athletes received scholarships to play college basketball in the United States.

In August 2025, the Lagos Legends team was acquired by Maktown Flyers Basketball Club by Maktwon Sports, and announced its intentions to be renamed to Mak Town Flyers.

The Legends had their breakthrough season in 2025, as they won their first national championship, after defeating the reigning champions Rivers Hoopers in the final. They won the game 74–72 on a lay-up by Patrick Abah, who was subsequently also named the league MVP.

== Honours ==
=== National ===
Nigerian Premier League

- Champions (1): 2025
