= NBBF National Division One =

- Organising body: Nigerian Basketball Federation (NBBF)
- Country: Nigeria
- Confederation: FIBA Africa
- Promotion to: Nigerian Premier League
- Relegation to: NBBF National Division Two
- Current champions: Nile Spartans (1st title) (2021)

The NBBF National Division One, known as the Total Division One per sponsorship, is the second level basketball league in Nigeria. In 2021, the league consisted of 18 teams divided over two conferences (Savannah and Atlantic). The champions of each season are promoted to the Nigerian Premier League.

The league is named after Total, who in 2018 signed a sponsorship agreement until 2025.

== Teams ==
The following teams played in the 2021 season:

=== Savannah Conference ===
Team	City / State
Apa Flames	Benue
Kano Pyramid	Kano
Zamfara Shooters	Zamfara
Yobe Desert Warriors	Yobe
AHIP Giants	Kano
Gombe Jewels	Gombe
Taraba Hurricannes	Taraba
Golden Touch	
Safety Knights	
Nile Spartans	Abuja
Ahmadu Bello University Kings	Zaria

=== Atlantic Conference ===
Team	City / State
Nigerian Air Force Rockets	
OS Lions	Osun
Ebun Comets	Lagos
Police Bombers	Lagos
Brave Heart	
Oilers	Lagos
Chuba Ikpeazu	Anambra
Enugu Coal City	
Edo Beads	Benin City

== Champions ==
Season	Champions	Runners-up	Final score	MVP	Ref.
2016	Hoops & Read	NSCDC	82–60		
2021	Nile Spartans	Ebun Comets	74–62	Nnoruka Francis	
