= Nigerian Premier League (basketball) =

- Organising body: Nigerian Basketball Federation (NBBF)
- Founded: 1995
- First season: 1995
- Country: Nigeria
- Confederation: FIBA Africa
- Divisions: 2
- Number of teams: 16 (2024)
- Relegation to: NBBF National Division One
- International cup: Basketball Africa League
- Current champions: Rivers Hoopers (7th title) (2026)
- Most championships: Kano Pillars; Rivers Hoopers (7 titles)
- 2026 Nigerian Basketball Premier League

The Nigerian Premier Basketball League, often abbreviated to the NPL, is the pre-eminent men's professional basketball league in Nigeria. The league consists of sixteen teams who are categorized into two conferences based on the geographical location. These conferences are Savannah and the Atlantic.

== Format ==
The league usually spans from March till mid year. Each team plays a total of 14 games in a regular season after which the top four teams qualify for the Final Eight Playoffs which usually takes place at the National Stadium Surulere Lagos. The team at the bottom of the table in each conference is relegated from the league. Towards the end of the year, the Division 1 Championship is held to determine who will be promoted to the DSTV League for the new season. In the 2014 season, Royal Hoopers of Rivers State and Niger Potter of Nigers State were both relegated from the Atlantic and Savannah Conference respectively. Accordingly, the Delta Force and FCT Rocks were promoted to the league having won the Division 1 Championship in November 2014.

Amendments were made to the schedule of events this season. At the end of the season, the top six teams from each conference will play conference playoffs to determine the winner of each conference before the top four of each conference will play the Final Eight Playoffs to determine the league winner. This is to increase the number of games played by each team in a particular season.

== History ==
The Nigerian Premier League was founded in 1995.

In 2017, Nigeria Basketball Federation reached an agreement with Kwese Sports for the title rights of the league. The deal runs till 2021, and it was worth $12 million.

Since 2021, the champions of the Premier League qualify directly for the regular season of the Basketball Africa League (BAL), Africa's new first-tier created as a joint venture by the NBA and FIBA.

In the 2021 season, the league was organised by the Nigerian Ministry of Youth and Sports, after they earlier dissolved the caretaker committee of the NBBF. FIBA rules prohibit governments from intervening in federations, which is why the championship was ruled illegitimate. As a result, the 2021 champions Rivers Hoopers were excluded from participation in the 2022 BAL season.

== Sponsorships ==
For sponsorship reasons the league has known several names in its existence. The league was sponsored by the DSTV until 2017, who had both title and TV rights through the contract agreement. The league was then referred to as the DSTV Premier Basketball League.

- 7up Premier League
- Vmobile Premier League (2006)
- DSTV Premier Basketball League (2017)

== List of winners ==
Season	Champions	Runner-up	Finals score	Finals venue	Ref.
2026	Lagos Legends	Aso Skyhawks	Round-robin	Rivers State Complex, Port Harcourt	
2025	Lagos Legends	Rivers Hoopers	74–72	Rivers State Complex, Port Harcourt	
2024	Rivers Hoopers	Hoops & Read	71–54	Rivers State Complex, Port Harcourt	
2023	Rivers Hoopers	Gboko City Chiefs	Round-robin	Rivers State Complex, Port Harcourt	
2022	Kwara Falcons	Nigeria Customs	78–53	National Stadium, Lagos	
2021^{1}	Rivers Hoopers	Gombe Bulls	74–57	Abuja Sports Hall, Abuja	
2020	Not held				
2019	Rivers Hoopers	Raptors	97–57	National Stadium, Lagos	
2018	Gombe Bulls	Kwara Falcons			
2017	Kano Pillars	Gombe Bulls			
2016	Kano Pillars	Nigeria Customs			
2015	Mark Mentors	Kano Pillars			
2014	Kano Pillars	Mark Mentors			
2013	Kano Pillars	Union Bank			
2012	Royal Hoopers	Kano Pillars			
2011	Royal Hoopers	Kano Pillars			
2010	Kano Pillars	Union Bank			
2009	Kano Pillars	Lagos Islanders	83–72	National Stadium, Lagos	
2008	Kano Pillars	Union Bank		National Stadium, Lagos	
2007	Ebun Comets	Union Bank	74–64	National Stadium, Lagos	
2006	Plateau Peaks	Dodan Warriors	2–0 (Note: In the 2006 season, the Premier League final was played in a best-of-three series.)	Ahmadu Bello Stadium, Kaduna	
2005	Ebun Comets	Niger Potters	Round-robin		
2003	Ebun Comets				
2001	Lagos Islanders	Plateau Peaks	70–55		
2000	Lagos Islanders				
1999	Lagos Islanders				
1998	Lagos Islanders				
1997	Lagos Islanders				

^{1} The 2021 season was not organised by the NBBF, but by the Nigerian Ministry of Youth and Sports in a response to the lack of . FIBA did not recognise Rivers Hoopers as champions, which caused them to lose their place in the 2022 BAL season.

=== Titles by club ===
Club	Champions	Runners-up	Years won
Kano Pillars	7	2	2008, 2009, 2010, 2013, 2014, 2016, 2017
Rivers Hoopers	7	1	2011, 2012, 2019, 2021, 2023, 2024, 2026
Lagos Islanders	5	0	1997, 1998, 1999, 2000, 2001
Ebun Comets	3	0	2003, 2005, 2007
Gombe Bulls	1	2	2018
Plateau Peaks	1	1	2006
Kwara Falcons	1	1	2022
Lagos Legends	1	0	2025

== Clubs ==
=== Savannah Conference ===
Club	City
Mark Mentors	Abuja
Bauchi Nets	Bauchi
Kano Pillars	Kano
Civil Defenders	Abuja
Plateau Peaks	Jos
Gombe Bulls	Gombe
Niger Potters	Minna
Kada Stars	Kaduna

=== Atlantic Conference ===
Club	City
Oluyole Warriors	Ibadan
Delta Force	Asaba
Hoops And Read	Lagos
Nigeria Customs	Lagos
NAF Rockets	Lagos
Police Baton	Lagos
CAMAC	Bayelsa
Kwara Falcons	Ilorin
Rivers Hoopers	Port-Harcourt

== In the Basketball Africa League ==
The champions of the Nigerian Premier League qualify directly to the Basketball Africa League (BAL). Two teams, namely Rivers Hoopers and Kwara Falcons, have represented the country in the BAL thus far.

Season	Representative	Road to BAL				Main competition		
Season	Representative	W	L	Result	Qualified	W	L	Result
2021	Rivers Hoopers	Directly qualified				1	2	3rd in Group Phase
2022	Rivers Hoopers	Directly qualified				Disqualified		
2023	Kwara Falcons	Directly qualified				0	5	6th in Sahara Conference
2024	Rivers Hoopers	Directly qualified				6	4	Bronze
2025	Rivers Hoopers	Directly qualified				4	4	Quarterfinals
2026	Maktown Flyers	Directly qualified				1	4	5th in Sahara Conference
Total		–	–			12	19	

== Individual awards ==
In some seasons, the NBBF has awarded individual awards to the best performing players of a given Premier League season.

=== Most Valuable Player ===
- 2009 – Abubakar Usman, Kano Pillars
- 2011 – Abubakar Usman, Kano Pillars
- 2012 – Azuoma Dike, Royal Hoopers
- 2013 – Azuoma Dike, Kano Pillars
- 2014 – Abubakar Usman, Kano Pillars
- 2015 – Abdul Yahaya, Royal Hoopers
- 2016 – Abubakar Usman, Kano Pillars
- 2018 – Ibe Agu, Gombe Bulls
- 2019 – Abdul Yahaya, Rivers Hoopers
- 2021 – Anaiye Johnson, Rivers Hoopers
- 2024 – Kelvin Amayo, Rivers Hoopers
- 2025 – Patrick Abah, Lagos Legends
- 2026 – Abel Offia, Rivers Hoopers

=== Finals Most Valuable Player ===
- 2017 – Nwafor Joseph, Kano Pillars
- 2021 – Victor Anthony Koko, Rivers Hoopers
- 2022 – Dada Samuel, Kwara Falcons
