= Rivers Hoopers =

- 2025 Rivers Hoopers season
- Nickname: The KingsMen
- Conference: Atlantic
- Leagues: Nigerian Premier League
- Founded: 2005
- History: Royal Hoopers (2005–2016); Rivers Hoopers (2016–present)
- Arena: Rivers State Basketball Complex
- Capacity: 1,000
- Location: Port Harcourt, Rivers, Nigeria
- Team colors: Blue and white
- General manager: Ifie Ozaka
- Head coach: Ogoh Odaudu
- Team captain: Victor Anthony Koko
- Ownership: Government of Rivers State
- Championships: 6 (2011, 2012, 2019, 2021, 2023, 2024)
Home	Away

Rivers Hoopers is a Nigerian professional basketball team based in Port Harcourt, Rivers State. The team plays in the Nigerian Premier League (NPL) and currently in the Basketball Africa League (BAL). Established in 2005 as Royal Hoopers, the team began to play in the NPL in 2019 and changed to their current name after the management of the team was taken over by the Government of Rivers State.

The Hoopers have played in the Premier League since its inception and won the national championship six times, with titles in 2011, 2012, 2019, 2021, 2023 and 2024. At the continental level, Rivers has played in the FIBA Africa Club Champions Cup three times, and in the Basketball Africa League (BAL) three times, the 2021, 2024 and 2025 seasons.

== History ==
The club was established in 2005 as Royal Hoopers, with former Nigeria national team player Ogoh Odaudu at the reins as head coach. In the club's first four years, they organised annual "classics" tournaments. The Hoopers entered the Nigerian Premier League (NPL) in 2009.

The Hoopers won their first NPL championship in 2011. They repeated as champions in 2012, behind star player Azuoma Dike who was named the league's MVP.

Following one year in the Division One that was followed by a promotion back to the NPL, management of the team was taken over by the Government of Rivers State in March 2016, and subsequently the team name was changed to Rivers Hoopers.

In December 2018, Hoopers played in the FIBA Africa Zone 3 Championship and won all five games to emerge as its Champions and went on to play in the 2019 Africa Basketball League in March. On 17 November 2019, the Hoopers won its third Nigerian title when it beat Raptors in the final. With this achievement, the team qualified directly for the inaugural season of Basketball Africa League (BAL).

To strengthen the team for the inaugural BAL season, the Hoopers acquired former NBA-players Ben Uzoh and Festus Ezeli. Ezeli, however, got injured before the season and did not join. Hoopers finished third in Group A of the BAL, beating only GNBC from Madagascar. Uzoh led the team in scoring with 14.7 points.

In the 2021 season, the Hoopers won the Premier League for a fourth time after edging Gombe Bulls in the final. Anaiye Johnson was named the league's MVP and Victor Anthony Koko was named final MVP. However, the Hoopers were denied to play in the BAL by FIBA Africa, because the league was organised by the Nigerian Ministry of Youth and Sports instead of the official administrator Nigeria Basketball Federation.

The KingsMen won the Crown Elite Championship in 2022 and won the second edition of the Louis Edem Invitational Basketball Championship on 2 September 2023 in Lagos after beating Spintex Knights of Ghana in the final.

The Hoopers won their 5th national title on 25 November 2023, following the Final Four which was hosted in Port Harcourt. They finished with an undefeated 13–0 record and qualified for the 2024 BAL season, where they will be making their second appearance. In the BAL, the Hoopers won the Sahara Conference title and qualified for the playoffs as the fourth seed, eventually finishing in third place. Three Rivers players, Devine Eke, Kelvin Amayo and Will Perry, were named to the All-BAL Teams.

In November 2024, the Hoopers won their sixth national title.

== Honours ==
=== National ===
Nigerian Premier League

- Champions (6): 2011, 2012, 2019, 2021, 2023, 2024

Crown Elite Basketball Championship

- Champions (1): 2022

Louis Edem Invitational Basketball Championship

- Winners (1): 2023

=== International ===
Basketball Africa League (BAL)

- Third place (1): 2024

== In African competitions ==
FIBA Africa Clubs Champions Cup (3 appearances)

- 2010 – Ninth Place
- 2011 – Eleventh Place
- 2018–19 – Group Stage

Basketball Africa League (2 appearance)

- 2021 – Group Stage
- 2024 – Bronze medal

== Players ==
=== Current roster ===
Note: Flags indicate national team eligibility at FIBA-sanctioned events. Players may hold other non-FIBA nationalities not displayed.

2025 Rivers Hoopers roster
Players
Coaches

Pos.	No.	Nat.	Name	Ht.	Age
SG	2	(Nigeria)	Offia, Abel	1.96 m (6 ft 5 in)	21 – 14 February 2005
PG	5	(Nigeria)	Afuwape, Micheal	1.88 m (6 ft 2 in)	28 – 17 August 1998
PF	7	(Nigeria)	Nwaiwu, Onyebuchi	2.01 m (6 ft 7 in)	28 – 20 August 1998
	10	(Nigeria)	Anaiye, Johnson	2.06 m (6 ft 9 in)	28 – 6 November 1997
PG	11	(Democratic Republic of the Congo)	Shamba, Maxi Munanga	1.90 m (6 ft 3 in)	32 – 25 December 1993
SG	12	(Australia)	Akec, Madut (I)	2.03 m (6 ft 8 in)	27 – 1 January 1999
SG	13	(Nigeria)	Amayo, Kelvin	1.96 m (6 ft 5 in)	34 – 9 January 1992
C	14	(Nigeria)	Olisemeka, Peter	2.06 m (6 ft 9 in)	34 – 9 December 1991
PF	15	(Nigeria)	Sani, Samuel	2.10 m (6 ft 11 in)	19 – 9 July 2007
SF	23	(Nigeria)	Koko Jr., Ifeanyi	2.03 m (6 ft 8 in)	21 – 8 December 2004
SF	24	(United States)	Putney, Raphiael (I)	2.07 m (6 ft 9 in)	36 – 21 April 1990
PF	28	(Nigeria)	Ike, David (E)	2.13 m (7 ft 0 in)	19 – 16 July 2007
SG	45	(Nigeria)	Abah, Ogbodeje	2.07 m (6 ft 9 in)	19 – 12 December 2006

Head coach

- (Nigeria) Ogoh Odaudu

Assistant coach(es)

- (Nigeria) Abdulrahman Mohammed

Legend

- (C) Team captain
- (I) Import player
- (E): BAL Elevate player
- Injured

- Roster
Updated: April 4, 2025

=== Notable players ===
- Chris Obekpa (2022) – Nigerian international and former BAL blocking leader.
- Ben Uzoh (2021) – Nigerian international and former Toronto Raptors player.
- Robinson Opong (2021) – Ugandan international.
- Abdul Yahaya (2019–2020) – Two-time Nigerian League MVP.

=== Individual awards ===
All-BAL First Team

- Will Perry – 2024

All-BAL Second Team

- Kelvin Amayo – 2024
- Devine Eke – 2024

BAL Coach of the Year

- Ogoh Odaudu – 2024

Premier League MVP

- Azuoma Dike – 2012
- Abdul Yahaya – 2019
- Johnson Anaiye – 2021

Premier League Final MVP

- Victor Anthony Koko – 2021

== Season by season ==
The following are the Hoopers' results in the BAL:

BAL champions	Conference champions	Playoff berth

Season	League		Regular season				Postseason	Head coach	Captain
Season	League	Conference	Finish	Wins	Losses	Win %	Postseason	Head coach	Captain
Rivers Hoopers
2021	BAL	Group A	3rd	1	2	.333	Did not qualify	Ogoh Odaudu	Victor Anthony Koko
2022	BAL	Excluded from participation by FIBA over NBBF dispute						Ogoh Odaudu	Victor Anthony Koko
2023	BAL	Did not qualify						Ogoh Odaudu	Victor Anthony Koko
2024	BAL	Sahara	1st	4	2	.667	Lost seeding game (Douanes); Won quarterfinals (Monastir) 92–88; Lost semifinal (Al Ahly Ly) 83–89; Won third place game (Cape Town) 80–57	Ogoh Odaudu	Victor Anthony Koko
2025	BAL	Kalahari	2nd	4	2	.667	Lost seeding game (Monastir) 81–89; Lost quarterfinals (APR) 73–104	Ogoh Odaudu	Victor Anthony Koko
Regular season record				9	6	.600	0 BAL championships		
Playoffs record				2	4	.333	0 BAL championships		
