= Ebun Comets =

- Conference: Atlantic
- League: NBBF National Division One
- Location: Lagos, Nigeria

Ebun Comets is a Nigerian professional basketball club. The club currently competes in the NBBF National Division One, the top flight league in the country. They have won one national championship, in 2003, 2005 and 2007. In 2006, they played In the FIBA Africa Club Champions Cup, where they finished 5th. On July 14, 2021, they won the inaugural season of the Crown Elite Basketball League. Until 2006, the team was based in the city of Akure in the Ondo State.

== Honours ==
Nigerian Premier League

- Champions (3): 2003, 2005, 2007

NBBF National Division One

- Runners-up (1): 2021

Crown Elite Basketball Championship

- Champions (1): 2021

FIBA Africa Cup Winners' Cup

- Runner-up (1): 2001
