= Lagos Islanders =

- League: Nigerian Premier League; Crown Elite Basketball Championship
- History: Lagos Islanders; 1984–present
- Arena: Rowe Park Sports Centre
- Location: Yaba, Lagos, Nigeria
- General manager: Adekunle Binuyo

The Lagos Islanders are a Nigerian basketball club based in Lagos, founded in 1984. The franchise was co-owned by the late music artist Sound Sultan since 2014. They play their home games at the Rowe Park Sports Centre in the Yaba area.

In 2016, the Islanders played in the private African Basketball League (ABL). Because the Nigerian Basketball Federation (NBBF) did not recognise this league, they were suspended from domestic leagues. The ban was lifted in 2019.

== Honours ==
Nigerian Premier League

- Winners (5): 1997, 1998, 1999, 2000, 2001

FIBA Africa Club Champions Cup

- Third place (1): 2000
