= Niger Potters =

Nigerian basketball team

- Leagues: Nigerian Premier League
- Location: Minna, Nigeria

Niger Potters is a Nigerian basketball team based in Minna. The team plays in the Nigerian Premier League. In 2007, the Potters finished fifth in the Africa Clubs Champions Cup.

== In African competitions ==
FIBA Africa Clubs Champions Cup (1 appearance)

2007 – 5th Place
