= Mark Mentors =

- Conference: Savannah
- Leagues: Nigerian Premier League
- Founded: 2012; 14 years ago
- Arena: Otukpo Indoor Sports Hall
- Location: Otukpo, Nigeria
- Head coach: Peter Ahmedu
Home

Mark Mentors is a Nigerian basketball club based in Abuja. Founded in 2012, team plays in the Nigerian Premier League. In 2015, the Mentors won their first national championship.

In 2018, the club announced its plans to move from Abuja to Otukpo to play in the Otukpo Indoor Sports Hall when it is finished.

== Honours ==
Nigerian Premier League

- Champions (1): 2015
  - Runners-up (2): 2013, 2014

== Players ==
=== Notable players ===
Note: Flags indicate national team eligibility at FIBA-sanctioned events. Players may hold other non-FIBA nationalities not displayed.

Criteria

To appear in this section a player must have either:

- Set a club record or won an individual award while at the club
- Played at least one official international match for their national team at any time
- Played at least one official NBA match at any time.

- (Nigeria) Abdul Yahaya
