= Nigeria Basketball Federation =

Governing body for basketball in Nigeria

- Founded: 1963; 63 years ago
- Affiliation: FIBA
- Regional affiliation: FIBA Africa
- Headquarters: Abuja and Lagos, Nigeria
- President: Ahmadu Musa Kida

Official website
- basketballnigeria.com

The Nigerian Basketball Federation (NBBF) is the governing body for men's and women's basketball in Nigeria. NBBF has been an affiliate of FIBA Africa since 1963, and its offices are located in Abuja and Lagos.

== FIBA competitions ==
The senior men's Nigerian national basketball team has participated in the FIBA Africa Championship games 17 times, in: 1972, 1978, 1980, 1985, 1987, 1992, 1995, 1997, 1999, 2001, 2003, 2005, 2007, 2009, 2011, 2013, and 2015. Earning one gold, three silver and three bronze medals, and participated twice in the FIBA World Cup, in 1998 and 2006, where they placed 13th and 14th respectively. The last edition of the Africa Championship saw Nigeria national basketball team clinching the gold medal after defeating the dominant Angolan team. This feat has placed the Nigeria national men's basketball team 1st in Africa and 16th in the world ranking while the women national team are placed 6th in Africa and 42nd in the world. This was achieved through painstaking planning of the Board of the federation led by Tijjani Umar.

Recently, the team has enjoyed success, due to an orchestrated recruitment of American college and professional players of Nigerian descent. A team dominated by Nigerian-Americans qualified for the 2006 FIBA World Championship, marking only the second time in the country's history that they qualified to the FIBA World Cup.

Eight players on the team that represented Nigeria at the 2009 FIBA AfroBasket tournament were born in the United States. Nigeria also qualified to the 2012 Summer Olympics, where their team consisted of 10 Nigerian-Americans, 10 of which were born in the United States.

== Other competitions ==
Nigeria has won several medals at the All-Africa Games, and placed 4th in the 2006 Commonwealth Games, falling short to 3rd place England.

The Nigerian male basketball team D'tigers participated in the 2018 Gold coast common wealth games and lost all games they played.

== Afrobasket 2015 Champions ==
Nigeria's senior men's basketball teams, a.k.a. D'Tigers, became the champions of Africa following their competing at the recently held 2015 Afrobasket Men's Championship in Tunisia from 19–30 August 2015.

The Tijjani Umar-led Board of the Nigeria Basketball Federation (NBBF) had to face different complications on the way to get to this level which other Boards before it was attained. The success of this game began in 2013 following the second tenure of Tijjani Umar as president of the NBBF. The Board began work in recruiting new players both within and outside the country.

At the Afrobasket in Abidjan, Côte d'Ivoire in 2013, Nigeria faced difficulties against Angola due to injuries and other technical factors. Umar and his team with contributions from the players then turned to the services of an experienced technical hand, William Voigt, to improve the team's capabilities. Voigt came along with his own staff to complement the Nigerian assistants provided by the NBBF.

Three players from the Nigerian league, the DStv Men's Basketball League, were among the preliminary team selected to begin camping in Abuja on 15 July 2015, but visa issues prevented them from joining the team's pre-tournament training in France and Italy where the team participated in invitational tournaments as well as friendly matches. While in Italy, the team's pivot, Ike Diogu, picked up a calf-muscle injury which eventually ruled him out of the competition. Diogu encouraged his teammates to continue on in competing without him.

Following their loss to host country, Tunisia, in the group stage, NBBF president, Umar, gave the players a pep talk to encourage them to play better. They then performed steadily until they competed against Senegal, who they then dispatched in over-time. Now in the final, the players were ready to compete against the Angolans, who had earlier lost to Senegal in the group stage.

Going into the final, the Director-General of the National Sports Commission (NSC), Mallam Al-Hassan Yakmut had confirmed to the NBBF president, that the Vice President, on behalf of the President of the Federal Republic of Nigeria was going to put a call through to the team to wish them good luck on behalf of the nation. Minutes before the jump-ball in the final, the team received a call from the Vice President, Prof. Yemi Osinbajo, who told the players to believe that they could stop Angola's winning streak and become African champions.

Following this message, they went into the game and competed against the Angolans, eventually ending the game by a nine-point victory for Nigeria at 74–65. This marked their first victory in the history of the championship.

== Sponsorship Deal ==
The Nigeria Basketball Federation (NBBF), recently unveiled Econnetmedia, owner of Kwese Sports as the new title sponsor of the Men's Premier Basketball League. With the formal signing of the agreement and unveiling of the title sponsor, the Men Premier Basketball League which was formerly known as DStv Premier Basketball League, will now be called and known as the Kwese Premier Basketball League.

Former NBBF president, Tijjani Umar disclosed this at a press conference in Abuja to unveil the name of the new title sponsor for the league.

Umar said the sponsorship deal is worth $12 million for five years (2017-2021) at a license fee of $2.2 million per season for all NBBF events including the Men's Premier Basketball League.

The $2.2 million per season deal is bigger than the previous four-year deal with DStv which was worth only $1.5 million for the four years duration.

The former president added that the exclusively broadcasting right of Kwese Premier Basketball League, including the 2017 league season which dunked off in Lagos is now owned by the Kwese Sports Channel.

In April 2018, the Ahmadu Musa Kida led NBBF to sign a 60 million Naira sponsorship deal for the Nigerian Divisions 1 and 2 male basketball leagues with Total Nigeria limited.

== Afrobasket Women 2017 ==
NAMES OF PLAYERS AND COACHES INVITED TO NATIONAL CAMP IN PREPARATION FOR THE AFROBASKET 2017 WOMEN CHAMPIONSHIP IN BAMAKO, MALI.

The Camps will resume on Monday, 24 July 2017 in Orlando, Florida, USA and Lagos, Nigeria respectively. The Foreign Based players will converge in Orlando, Florida while the Home Based with some Foreign Based players holidaying in Nigeria will converge in Lagos, Nigeria on the above stated date.

The Full list of the players and Coaches for the Orlando, Florida, USA and Lagos, Nigeria Camps are as follows:

A. Orlando, Florida, USA Camp

1. Ezinne Kalu

2. Promise Amukamara

3. Adaeze Alaeze

4. Helen Ogunjimi

5. Ayoleka Sodade

6. Ndidi Madu

7. Cecilia Okoye

8. Aisha Mohammed

9. Patience Okpe

10. Sarah Imovbioh

11. Ugo Nwaigwe

12. Balogun Elizabeth

13. Joyce Ekworomadu

14. Evelyn Akhator

COACH

Vincent James Samuel(Sam Vincent)

B. Lagos, Nigeria Camp

1. Sarah Ogoke – Foreign Based

2. Uju Ugoka - Foreign Based

3. Adaora Elonu – Foreign Based

4. Chioma Udeaja – First Bank

5. Nkechi Akashili - First Bank

6. Upe Atosu – First Bank

7. Elawure Tina Odion – First Bank

8. Akaraiwe Nkem – First Bank

9. Ukato Igere Magdalene – First Bank

10. Nwamaka Deborah Chidinma – First Bank

11. Ulabo Queen Roseline - Dolphins

12. Olaosebikan Tokunbo - Dolphins

13. Ume Nwamaka Gloria – Plateau Rocks

14. Okonkwo Grace – IGP Queens

15. Isaac Christiana – IGP Queens

COACHES

1. Peter Favour Ahmedu - First Bank

2. Ochuko Okorogun - Dolphins

== Afrobasket Women's champions 2017 ==
The Nigerian female basketball side D'tigress were crowned FIBA 2017 women's Afrobasket after defeating Senegal in the Final.

== Nigerian Premier League ==
The Nigerian Premier League (KPL) (basketball)is the top professional basketball league for Men while the Zenith Women Basketball League is the top professional basketball League for Women in Nigeria.

=== Teams (Kwese Premier League) ===
SAVANNAH CONFERENCE

- Bauchi Nets (Bauchi)
- Kano Pillars (basketball) (Kano)
- Gombe Bulls (Gombe)
- Plateau Peaks (Jos)
- Mark Mentors (Abuja)
- Defenders (Abuja)
- Niger Potters(Niger)
- Kada Stars (Kaduna)

ATLANTIC CONFERENCE

- Oluyole Warriors (Ibadan)
- Hoops & Read (Lagos)
- Royal Hoopers (Rivers)
- NAF Rockets (Lagos)
- Delta Force (Asaba)
- Nigeria Customs (Lagos)
- Police Baton (Lagos)
- Kwara Falcons (Kwara)

=== Teams (Zenith Women's League) ===
- First Bank (Lagos)
- Dolphins (Lagos)
- 1st Deepwater (Lagos)
- Plateau Rocks (Jos)
- FCT Angels (Abuja)
- IGP Queens (Lagos)
- Nigeria Customs (Lagos)
- GT 2000 (Kaduna)
- Oluyole Babes (Ibadan)
- Nasarawa Amazons (Nasarawa)
- Ekiti Angels (Ekiti)
- Taraba Hurricanes (Taraba)
- Delta Force (Asaba)
- Coal City Queens (Enugu)
- Zamfara Babes (Zamfara)
- Sunshine Angels (Ondo)
- AHIP (Kano)
- Benue Princess (Benue)
- Delta Force (Delta)
