= Gombe Bulls =

- Leagues: Nigerian Premier League
- Founded: 1985; 41 years ago
- Location: Gombe State, Nigeria
- Championships: 1 (2018)
- Website: Official website

Gombe Bulls is a Nigerian professional basketball team located in Gombe State. The team competes in the Nigerian Premier League.

== History ==
The team participated in the 2017 FIBA Africa Clubs Champions Cup, which was the first time the team played in the top continental league in Africa. The Bulls finished 11th with a 2–5 record.

In 2018, Gombe won their first ever Nigerian Premier League title after defeating the Kwara Falcons in the final.

== Honours ==
Nigerian Premier League

- Champions (1): 2018
  - Runners-up (1): 2017

== In African competitions ==
FIBA Africa Clubs Champions Cup (1 appearance)

2017 – Preliminary Round

== Notable players ==
Note: Flags indicate national team eligibility at FIBA-sanctioned events. Players may hold other non-FIBA nationalities not displayed.

Criteria

To appear in this section a player must have either:

- Set a club record or won an individual award while at the club
- Played at least one official international match for their national team at any time
- Played at least one official NBA match at any time.

- (Nigeria) John Idu
- (Nigeria) Abdulwahad Yakubu
