= Kano Pillars BC =

Kano Pillars
- Leagues: Nigerian Premier League
- Arena: Kano State Sports Council
- Location: Kano, Nigeria

Kano Pillars Basketball Club is a Nigerian basketball club based in Kano. The team plays in the Nigerian Premier League and holds the record for most championships with seven titles. The team has regularly played in the FIBA Africa Clubs Champions Cup, winning bronze in 1985 and 1987. In 2024, Kano Pillars BC drew an average home attendance of 599, one of the highest of all Nigerian basketball clubs.

== Honours ==
Nigerian Premier League

- Champions (7): 2008, 2009, 2010, 2013, 2014, 2016, 2017
- Runners-up (2): 2012, 2015

FIBA Africa Clubs Champions Cup

- Third place (2): 1985, 1987
- Fourth place: 2016

== In African competitions ==
FIBA Africa Clubs Champions Cup (9 appearances)

1985 – 3rd Place (bronze)
1987 – 3rd Place (bronze)
2005 – 5th Place

2010 – 5th Place
2012 – 9th Place
2013 – 9th Place

2015 – 7th Place
2016 – 4th Place
2017 – Preliminary Round
