= 2024 BAL Sahara Conference =

2024 Sahara Conference
Tournament details
- Country: Senegal
- City: Dakar
- Venue(s): Dakar Arena
- Dates: 4–12 May 2024
- Teams: 4

Final positions
- Champions: (Nigeria) Rivers Hoopers (1st title)

Tournament statistics
- Top scorer: Obadiah Noel, APR (19.4 points per game)

The 2024 BAL Sahara Conference was the 3rd season of the Sahara Conference, one of the three conferences of the 2024 season of the Basketball Africa League (BAL). The composition of the conference and the schedule were announced on 15 February 2024. The conference games began on 4 May and ended on 12 May 2024.

== Summary ==
Despite being considered the weakest team, the Rivers Hoopers came out with three straight wins. The Hoopers were the first team to clinch a playoffs spot on the fifth gameday. US Monastir, the 2022 BAL champions, lost their first three games. They became the first former BAL champions to lose four games in a row, dating back to the previous season. The game between APR and Rivers Hoopers on May 11 was the first double-overtime game in BAL history. On May 9, Mike Fofana scored a buzzer-beater game winner to give AS Douanes the win over Rivers Hoopers.

Coming into the final game day on May 12, the last two games decided the last two playoffs spots. On the last gameday, US Monastir qualified after finishing with a 3–3 record. AS Douanes and APR battled for the last playoffs spot, with the winner advancing, and AS Douanes eventually secured its spot.

== Standings ==
Pos	Team	Pld	W	L	GF	GA	GD	PCT	Qualification
1	(Nigeria) Rivers Hoopers	6	4	2	441	413	+28	.667	Advance to playoffs
2	(Senegal) AS Douanes (H)	6	3	3	409	385	+24	.500 (Note: Head-to-head: AS Douanes 1–1 US Monastir, AS Douanes won on aggregrate point difference (+1).)	Advance to playoffs
3	(Tunisia) US Monastir	6	3	3	437	450	−13	.500	Advance to playoffs
4	(Rwanda) APR	6	2	4	432	471	−39	.333	

Source: BAL
Rules for classification: Tiebreakers
(H) Hosts

== Games ==
May 4, 2024
2:30 PM

Livestats

US Monastir (Tunisia)	84–89 (OT)	(Rwanda) APR
Scoring by quarter: 20–20, 20–19, 15–13, 23–26, Overtime: 6–11
Pts: Crawford 21; Rebs: Lahyani, Majok 9 Asts: Crawford 7		Pts: Filer, Noel 24; Rebs: Abdullah 9 Asts: Filer 4

Dakar Arena, Dakar
Attendance: 850
Referees: Kenny Jones, Yann Vezo Davidson, Kingsley Ojeaburu

May 4, 2024
5:30 PM

Livestats

AS Douanes (Senegal)	68–77	(Nigeria) Rivers Hoopers
Scoring by quarter: 23–18, 16–19, 9–19, 20–21
Pts: Akec 19; Rebs: Obekpa 14; Asts: Boissy 4		Pts: Eke 31; Rebs: Eke 12; Asts: Amayo 8

Dakar Arena, Dakar
Attendance: 8,543
Referees: Tyler Mirkovich, Aboolo Amr, Hassan Kamate

May 5, 2024
2:30 PM

Livestats

APR (Rwanda)	82–86	(Nigeria) Rivers Hoopers
Scoring by quarter: 18–19, 22–21, 22–23, 20–23
Pts: Noel 32; Rebs: Noel 7 Asts: Filer, Robeyns 4		Pts: Perry 31; Rebs: Eke, Ike 8 Asts: Amayo 7

Dakar Arena, Dakar
Attendance: 734
Referees: Kaitlynn Versoza, Kalume Tonton Banza, Adlen Larouci

May 5, 2024
5:30 PM

Livestats

AS Douanes (Senegal)	76–59	(Tunisia) US Monastir
Scoring by quarter: 12–17, 20–14, 14–15, 30–15
Pts: Harouna 35; Rebs: Akec 9 Asts: Boissy 8		Pts: Williams 16; Rebs: Majok 13; Asts: Crawford 5

Dakar Arena, Dakar
Attendance: 4,578
Referees: Cameron Gelinas, Walelign Fikadu Gebeto, Natascha Onono

May 7, 2024
4:00 PM

Livestats

US Monastir (Tunisia)	63–84	(Nigeria) Rivers Hoopers
Scoring by quarter: 13–24, 16–25, 22–18, 12–17
Pts: Doucouré 21; Rebs: Crawford 7 Asts: Crawford 14		Pts: Amayo 30; Rebs: Eke 12; Asts: Amayo, Perry 9

Dakar Arena, Dakar
Attendance: 973
Referees: Tyler Mirkovich, Kalume Tonton Banza, Hassan Kamate

May 7, 2024
7:00 PM

Livestats

APR (Rwanda)	66–61	(Senegal) AS Douanes
Scoring by quarter: 11–17, 16–9, 19–16, 20–19
Pts: Noel 24; Rebs: Noel 8 Asts: Filer, Robeyns 3		Pts: Boissy 14; Rebs: Boissy, Fofana 6 Asts: Boissy 11

Dakar Arena, Dakar
Attendance: 4,478
Referees: Kenny Jones, Aboolo Amr, Adlen Larouci

May 9, 2024
4:00 PM

Livestats

APR (Rwanda)	70–83	(Tunisia) US Monastir
Scoring by quarter: 22–19, 15–17, 17–14, 16–33
Pts: Hunt 17; Rebs: Filer 11; Asts: Noel 5		Pts: Crawford 31; Rebs: Majok 10; Asts: Crawford 5

Dakar Arena, Dakar
Attendance: 2,330
Referees: Cameron Gelinas, Kingsley Ojeaburu, Kalume Tonton Banza

May 9, 2024
7:00 PM

Livestats

Rivers Hoopers (Nigeria)	54–56	(Senegal) AS Douanes
Scoring by quarter: 5–14, 21–19, 15–7, 13–16
Pts: Perry 17; Rebs: Olisemeka 18; Asts: Perry 5		Pts: Akec 17; Rebs: Thomas 9 Asts: Boissy 4

Dakar Arena, Dakar
Attendance: 6,876
Referees: Cameron Gelinas, Yann Vezo Davidson, Natascha Onono

May 11, 2024
2:30 PM

Livestats

Rivers Hoopers (Nigeria)	78–71 (2OT)	(Rwanda) APR
Scoring by quarter: 16–19, 15–11, 10–20, 17–8, Overtime: 17–8, 20–3
Pts: Eke 18; Rebs: Eke 20; Asts: Perry 6		Pts: Nshobozwabyosenumukiza 16; Rebs: Hunt 14; Asts: Hunt 7

Dakar Arena, Dakar
Attendance: 750
Referees: Cameron Gelinas, Aboolo Amr, Kalume Tonton Banza

May 11, 2024
5:30 PM

Livestats

US Monastir (Tunisia)	75–69	(Senegal) AS Douanes
Scoring by quarter: 17–15, 31–20, 10–15, 17–19
Pts: Crawford 16; Rebs: Lahyani 10; Asts: Crawford 6		Pts: Harouna 22; Rebs: Akec 7 Asts: Fofana 2

Dakar Arena, Dakar
Attendance: 8,208
Referees: Tyler Mirkovich, Kingsley Ojeaburu, Natascha Onono

May 12, 2024
2:30 PM

Livestats

Rivers Hoopers (Nigeria)	62–73	(Tunisia) US Monastir
Scoring by quarter: 13–19, 20–19, 9–18, 20–17
Pts: Eke 13; Rebs: Olisemeka 10; Asts: Amayo 7		Pts: Crawford 21; Rebs: Majok 16; Asts: Crawford 9

Dakar Arena, Dakar
Attendance: 2,604
Referees: Kenny Jones, Kalume Tonton Banza, Walelign Fikadu Gebeto

May 12, 2024
5:30 PM

Livestats

AS Douanes (Senegal)	79–54	(Rwanda) APR
Scoring by quarter: 23–18, 21–10, 19–18, 16–8
Pts: Fofana 27; Rebs: Akec 9 Asts: Harouna 8		Pts: Mpoyo 22; Rebs: Mpoyo 7 Asts: Robeyns 4

Dakar Arena, Dakar
Attendance: 8,632
Referees: Kaitlynn Versoza, Yann Vezo Davidson, Hassan Kamate

== Player statistics ==
Category	Player	Team(s)	Statistic
Points per game	Obadiah Noel	APR	19.4
Rebounds per game	Devine Eke	Rivers Hoopers	11.7
Assists per game	Chris Crawford	Rivers Hoopers	8.5
Steals per game	Abdoulaye Harouna	AS Douanes	3.8
Blocks per game	Ater Majok	US Monastir	1.5
