= 2024 APR BBC season =

APR
2024 season
- Chairman: Richard Murefu
- Head coach: Maz Trakh (2nd season)
- BAL: 4th in Sahara Conference
- RBL: Champions
- Rwandan Cup: Champions
- Biggest win: APR 141–47 Inspired Generation (7 June 2024)

In the 2024 season for APR played internationally in the Basketball Africa League (BAL) and domestically in the Rwanda Basketball League (RBL). The team played in the BAL following their championship in the 2023 season, that ended a 14-year title drought for APR. It was the second season under coach Maz Trakh.

In national competition, APR won the double by winning both the RBL and the inaugural Rwandan Cup. In the BAL, they were eliminated in the conference phase, becoming the first Rwandan team to not qualify for the playoffs.

== Overview ==
APR began their training in December 2023, when they ended a residential camp. In February, APR will have a 10-day a training camp in Qatar, where they will face the Qatar national team, among others. Maz Trakh continued as head coach, and was joined by former NBA assistant coach Bill Bayno.

In May 2024, APR played the Sahara Conference. After a 2–1 start, APR lost all of its three games in the third round. Ahead of the final game day star players Obadiah Noel (hamstring) and Adonis Filer (achilles tendon) were unable to play due to injuries. A win in the final game against AS Douanes would have given the Rwandans a playoff spot, however, Douanes defeated APR 79–54. It was the first time in league history that there was no Rwandan team in the playoffs.

== Transactions ==
=== In ===
No.	Pos.	Nat.	Name	Age	Moving from		Type	Ends	Date	Source
00	PG	(Rwanda)	Adonis Filer	30	REG	(Rwanda)	Free agent	Undisclosed	October 2023	
2	PG	(United States)	Michael Dixon	33	Kolossos Rodou	(Greece)	Free agent	Undisclosed	December 2023	
–	PG	(United States)	Zion Styles	23	Maryland Eastern Shore	(United States)	Free agent	2024	December 6, 2023	
4	F	(United States)	Dario Hunt	34	Cantù	(Italy)	Free agent	Undisclosed	January 9, 2024	
31	C	(Mali)	Aliou Diarra	22	FUS Rabat	(Morocco)	Free agent	2025	July 17, 2024	

== Players ==
=== BAL roster ===
Note: Flags indicate national team eligibility at FIBA-sanctioned events. Players may hold other non-FIBA nationalities not displayed.

APR roster
Players
Coaches

Pos.	No.	Nat.	Name	Ht.		Age
G	00	(Rwanda)	Filer, Adonis	1.83 m (6 ft 0 in)		33 – 11 July 1993
G	2	(United States)	Noel, Obadiah (I)	1.92 m (6 ft 4 in)	80 kg (176 lb)	27 – 28 June 1999
F/C	4	(United States)	Hunt, Dario	2.06 m (6 ft 9 in)		37 – 2 May 1989
F	5	(Rwanda)	Ruta, Christopher	2.08 m (6 ft 10 in)		25 – 9 November 2000
SG	6	(Rwanda)	Robeyns, William	1.91 m (6 ft 3 in)		30 – 23 February 1996
F	7	(Rwanda)	Mpoyo, Axel	2.01 m (6 ft 7 in)		29 – 5 January 1997
G	11	(Rwanda)	Nshobozwabyosenumukiza, Jean Jacques	1.83 m (6 ft 0 in)		28 – 26 June 1998
PF	14	(Kenya)	Wamukota, Tom	2.13 m (7 ft 0 in)		33 – 28 September 1993
PG	15	(Rwanda)	Habimana, Ntore	1.96 m (6 ft 5 in)		29 – 15 August 1997
SF	23	(Rwanda)	Kimasa, Dan	1.98 m (6 ft 6 in)		31 – 1 January 1995
G/F	28	(Senegal)	Camara, Mohamed (E)	2.03 m (6 ft 8 in)		21 – 1 April 2005
F/C	34	(Egypt)	Abdullah, Mohamed (I)	2.06 m (6 ft 9 in)		22 – 3 November 2003
PG	45	(Rwanda)	Larson, Niyibizi	1.83 m (6 ft 0 in)		20 – 14 October 2006

Head coach

- (United States) Maz Trakh

Assistant coach(es)

- (United States) Bill Bayno
- (Rwanda) Daniel Zigirinshuti

Legend

- (C) Team captain
- (I) Import player
- (E): BAL Elevate player
- Injured

- Roster
Updated: May 4, 2024

== Competitions ==
=== Friendly games ===
22 February 2024	Al-Wakrah (Qatar)	80–108	(Rwanda) APR	Doha, Qatar
		Boxscore		Arena: Al Rayyan Arena

24 February 2024	APR (Rwanda)	84–77	(Qatar) Al Rayyan	Doha, Qatar
	Scoring by quarter: 22–23, 23–13, 23–21, 18–18
	Pts: Nshobozwa 19	Boxscore	Pts: White, Faye 14	Arena: Al Rayyan Indoor Arena

26 February 2024	APR (Rwanda)	110–77	(Qatar) Al-Wakrah	Doha, Qatar
	Scoring by quarter: 26–13, 27–18, 27–21, 30–25
	Pts: Styles 30	Boxscore	Pts: Murry 17	Arena: Al Wakrah Indoor Arena

23 March 2024	APR (Rwanda)	77–76	(Egypt) Al Ittihad Alexandria	Kigali, Rwanda
		Boxscore		Arena: STECOL Basketball Court

26 March 2024	APR (Rwanda)	72–77	(Egypt) Al Ittihad Alexandria	Kigali, Rwanda
		Boxscore		Arena: STECOL Basketball Court

=== Rwanda Basketball League ===
The official schedule was announced on 17 December 2023.

==== Regular season ====
February 9, 2024	APR	98–67	Kepler	Lycée de Kigali

February 17, 2024	Inspired Generation	52–93	APR	Lycée de Kigali

March 6, 2024	APR	84–62	UGB	Lycée de Kigali

March 8, 2024	APR	105–67	Orion BBC	Lycée de Kigali

March 13, 2024	Tigers BBC	70–105	APR	Lycée de Kigali

March 15, 2024	Kigali Titans	71–92	APR	Lycée de Kigali

March 20, 2024	APR	59–73	Patriots BBC	Lycée de Kigali

March 27, 2024	Espoir	88–113	APR	Lycée de Kigali

March 29, 2024	APR	78–75	REG	Lycée de Kigali

June 5, 2024	Kepler	73–89	APR	Lycée de Kigali

June 7, 2024	APR	141–47	Inspired Generation	Lycée de Kigali

June 21, 2024	APR	101–69	Kigali Titans	Lycée de Kigali

June 26, 2024	UGB	76–85	APR	Lycée de Kigali

June 29, 2024	Orion	65–124	APR	Lycée de Kigali

July 21, 2024	APR	94–76	Espoir	Lycée de Kigali

July 31, 2024	REG	75–77	APR	Lycée de Kigali

August 4, 2024	Tigers	vs.	APR	Lycée de Kigali

=== Rwanda Cup ===
==== Quarterfinals ====
July 9, 2024	APR	111–64	Azomco	Kigali
				Arena: Lycée de Kigali

=== Basketball Africa League ===
==== Sahara Conference ====
Pos	Team	Pld	W	L	PF	PA	PD	PCT	Qualification
1	(Nigeria) Rivers Hoopers	6	4	2	441	413	+28	.667	Advance to playoffs
2	(Senegal) AS Douanes (H)	6	3	3	409	385	+24	.500 (Note: Head-to-head: AS Douanes 1–1 US Monastir, AS Douanes won on aggregrate point difference (+1).)	Advance to playoffs
3	(Tunisia) US Monastir	6	3	3	437	450	−13	.500	Advance to playoffs
4	(Rwanda) APR	6	2	4	432	471	−39	.333	

Source: BAL
Rules for classification: Tiebreakers
(H) Hosts
Notes:

May 4, 2024 1	US Monastir (Tunisia Basketball Federation)	84–89(OT)	(Rwanda Basketball Federation) APR	Dakar
2:30 PM	Scoring by quarter: 20–20, 20–19, 15–13, 23–26, Overtime: 6–11
	Pts: Crawford 21; Rebs: Lahyani, Majok 9 Asts: Crawford 7	Livestats	Pts: Filer, Noel 24; Rebs: Abdullah 9 Asts: Filer 4	Arena: Dakar Arena; Attendance: 850; Referees: Kenny Jones, Yann Vezo Davidson, Kingsley Ojeaburu

May 5, 2024 2	APR (Rwanda Basketball Federation)	82–86	(Nigeria Basketball Federation) Rivers Hoopers	Dakar
2:30 PM	Scoring by quarter: 18–19, 22–21, 22–23, 20–23
	Pts: Noel 32; Rebs: Noel 7 Asts: Filer, Robeyns 4	Livestats	Pts: Perry 31; Rebs: Eke, Ike 8 Asts: Amayo 7	Arena: Dakar Arena; Attendance: 734; Referees: Kaitlynn Versoza, Kalume Tonton Banza, Adlen Larouci

May 7, 2024 3	APR (Rwanda Basketball Federation)	66–61	(Fédération Sénégalaise de Basket-Ball) AS Douanes	Dakar
7:00 PM	Scoring by quarter: 11–17, 16–9, 19–16, 20–19
	Pts: Noel 24; Rebs: Noel 8 Asts: Filer, Robeyns 3	Livestats	Pts: Boissy 14; Rebs: Boissy, Fofana 6 Asts: Boissy 11	Arena: Dakar Arena; Attendance: 4,478; Referees: Kenny Jones, Aboolo Amr, Adlen Larouci

May 9, 2024 4	APR (Rwanda Basketball Federation)	70–83	(Tunisia Basketball Federation) US Monastir	Dakar
4:00 PM	Scoring by quarter: 22–19, 15–17, 17–14, 16–33
	Pts: Hunt 17; Rebs: Filer 11; Asts: Noel 5	Livestats	Pts: Crawford 31; Rebs: Majok 10; Asts: Crawford 5	Arena: Dakar Arena; Attendance: 2,330; Referees: Cameron Gelinas, Kingsley Ojeaburu, Kalume Tonton Banza

May 11, 2024 5	Rivers Hoopers (Nigeria Basketball Federation)	78–71(2OT)	(Rwanda Basketball Federation) APR	Dakar
2:30 PM	Scoring by quarter: 16–19, 15–11, 10–20, 17–8, Overtime: 17–8, 20–3
	Pts: Eke 18; Rebs: Eke 20; Asts: Perry 6	Livestats	Pts: Nshobozwabyosenumukiza 16; Rebs: Hunt 14; Asts: Hunt 7	Arena: Dakar Arena; Attendance: 750; Referees: Cameron Gelinas, Aboolo Amr, Kalume Tonton Banza

May 12, 2024 6	AS Douanes (Fédération Sénégalaise de Basket-Ball)	79–54	(Rwanda Basketball Federation) APR	Dakar
5:30 PM	Scoring by quarter: 23–18, 21–10, 19–18, 16–8
	Pts: Fofana 27; Rebs: Akec 9 Asts: Harouna 8	Livestats	Pts: Mpoyo 22; Rebs: Mpoyo 7 Asts: Robeyns 4	Arena: Dakar Arena; Attendance: 8,632; Referees: Kaitlynn Versoza, Yann Vezo Davidson, Hassan Kamate

== Player statistics ==
Legend
GP	Games played	GS	Games started	MPG	Minutes per game
FG%	Field-goal percentage	3P%	3-point field-goal percentage	FT%	Free-throw percentage
RPG	Rebounds per game	APG	Assists per game	SPG	Steals per game
BPG	Blocks per game	PPG	Points per game

=== BAL ===
After the end of the season.

APR statistics
Player	GP	MPG	FG%	3FG%	FT%	RPG	APG	SPG	BPG	PPG
Mohamed Camara	1	4.1	.333	.000	–	2.0	0.0	0.0	0.0	2.0
Adonis Filer	5	31.1	.294	.192	.750	6.2	3.8	1.2	0.6	10.8
Ntore Habimana	6	23.1	.289	.067	.643	3.2	2.5	0.3	0.3	6.0
Dario Hunt	6	28.7	.491	–	.647	7.3	3.0	1.5	1.0	11.2
Dan Kimasa	2	7.7	.000	.000	–	1.5	0.0	0.0	0.0	0.0
Niyibizi Larson	1	1.0	.000	–	–	0.0	0.0	0.0	0.0	0.0
Axel Mpoyo	6	36.1	.403	.378	.667	7.2	0.5	1.7	0.3	12.2
Mohamed Abdullah	6	16.5	.389	.000	.357	5.7	0.8	0.3	1.2	3.2
Obadiah Noel	5	26.7	.357	.241	.870	4.2	2.6	1.4	0.2	19.4
Jean Jacques Nshobozwabyosenumukiza	6	19.4	.229	.219	1.000	3.2	1.3	2.2	0.0	5.2
William Robeyns	6	29.1	.383	.310	.667	2.5	2.8	1.0	0.0	8.2
Chris Ruta	1	5.6	.000	.000	–	0.0	0.0	0.0	0.0	0.0
Bush Wamukota	5	8.4	.125	.000	.500	2.6	0.4	0.2	0.0	0.8
