= 2024 Rivers Hoopers season =

19th season of the Rivers Hoopers basketball club

Rivers Hoopers
2024 season
- Head coach: Ogoh Odaudu
- NPL: To be played
- BAL: Third Place

The 2024 Rivers Hoopers season is the 19th season in club history and the second season of the team in the Basketball Africa League (BAL). The Hoopers will play in the Nigerian Premier League (NPL) once again as defending champions.

The Hoopers enforced their team with American guard Will Perry, as well as with Devine Eke. Eke and Perry were named to the All-BAL Second Team after the conclusion of the season. They were allocated in the Sahara Conference, and surprisingly won the conference and sealed their first ever playoff spot. In the quarterfinals, they defeated US Monastir, and in the semi-finals they lost to Al Ahly Ly in overtime. The Hoopers defeated South Africa's Cape Town Tigers to clinch the third place, becoming the first Nigerian team in the BAL to finish with a medal.

== Roster ==
=== BAL roster ===
The final roster was revealed by the BAL on 4 May 2024.

Note: Flags indicate national team eligibility at FIBA-sanctioned events. Players may hold other non-FIBA nationalities not displayed.

2024 Rivers Hoopers roster
Players
Coaches

Pos.	No.	Nat.	Name	Ht.	Age
CG	2	(Nigeria)	Offia, Abel	1.98 m (6 ft 6 in)	21 – 14 February 2005
SF	4	(Nigeria)	Daramola, Michael	1.93 m (6 ft 4 in)	24 – 20 October 2002
PG	5	(Nigeria)	Anaiye, Johnson	1.82 m (6 ft 0 in)	29 – 6 November 1997
F	6	(Nigeria)	Ike, David (E)	2.10 m (6 ft 11 in)	19 – 16 July 2007
SF	7	(Nigeria)	Nwaiwu, Onyebuchi	2.01 m (6 ft 7 in)	28 – 20 August 1998
G	10	(Nigeria)	Oyebanji, Mustapha	1.88 m (6 ft 2 in)	25 – 20 April 2001
PG	12	(United States)	Perry, Will (I)	1.83 m (6 ft 0 in)	33 – 11 October 1993
G	13	(Nigeria)	Amayo, Kelvin	1.95 m (6 ft 5 in)	34 – 9 January 1992
C	14	(Nigeria)	Olisemeka, Peter	2.04 m (6 ft 8 in)	34 – 9 December 1991
PF	15	(Nigeria)	Koko, Victor Anthony (C)	2.06 m (6 ft 9 in)	33 – 14 December 1992
SF	23	(Nigeria)	Eke, Devine	2.03 m (6 ft 8 in)	30 – 29 July 1996
PF	34	(France)	Wilkins, John (I)	2.08 m (6 ft 10 in)	37 – 13 July 1989

Head coach

- (Nigeria) Ogoh Odaudu

Assistant coach(es)

- (Nigeria) Abdulrahman Mohammed

Legend

- (C) Team captain
- (I) Import player
- (E): BAL Elevate player
- Injured

- Roster
Updated: 4 May 2024

== Games ==
=== BAL ===
==== Sahara Conference ====
Pos	Team	Pld	W	L	PF	PA	PD	PCT	Qualification
1	(Nigeria) Rivers Hoopers	6	4	2	441	413	+28	.667	Advance to playoffs
2	(Senegal) AS Douanes (H)	6	3	3	409	385	+24	.500 (Note: Head-to-head: AS Douanes 1–1 US Monastir, AS Douanes won on aggregrate point difference (+1).)	Advance to playoffs
3	(Tunisia) US Monastir	6	3	3	437	450	−13	.500	Advance to playoffs
4	(Rwanda) APR	6	2	4	432	471	−39	.333	

Source: BAL
Rules for classification: Tiebreakers
(H) Hosts
Notes:

May 4, 2024	AS Douanes (Fédération Sénégalaise de Basket-Ball)	68–77	(Nigeria Basketball Federation) Rivers Hoopers	Dakar Arena, Dakar
5:30 PM	Scoring by quarter: 23–18, 16–19, 9–19, 20–21
	Pts: Akec 19; Rebs: Obekpa 14; Asts: Boissy 4	Livestats	Pts: Eke 31; Rebs: Eke 12; Asts: Amayo 8	Attendance: 8,543; Referees: Tyler Mirkovich, Aboolo Amr, Hassan Kamate

May 5, 2024	APR (Rwanda Basketball Federation)	82–86	(Nigeria Basketball Federation) Rivers Hoopers	Dakar Arena, Dakar
2:30 PM	Scoring by quarter: 18–19, 22–21, 22–23, 20–23
	Pts: Noel 32; Rebs: Noel 7 Asts: Filer, Robeyns 4	Livestats	Pts: Perry 31; Rebs: Eke, Ike 8 Asts: Amayo 7	Attendance: 734; Referees: Kaitlynn Versoza, Kalume Tonton Banza, Adlen Larouci

May 7, 2024	US Monastir (Tunisia Basketball Federation)	63–84	(Nigeria Basketball Federation) Rivers Hoopers	Dakar Arena, Dakar
4:00 PM	Scoring by quarter: 13–24, 16–25, 22–18, 12–17
	Pts: Doucouré 21; Rebs: Crawford 7 Asts: Crawford 14	Livestats	Pts: Amayo 30; Rebs: Eke 12; Asts: Amayo, Perry 9	Attendance: 973; Referees: Tyler Mirkovich, Kalume Tonton Banza, Hassan Kamate

May 9, 2024	Rivers Hoopers (Nigeria Basketball Federation)	54–56	(Fédération Sénégalaise de Basket-Ball) AS Douanes	Dakar Arena, Dakar
7:00 PM	Scoring by quarter: 5–14, 21–19, 15–7, 13–16
	Pts: Perry 17; Rebs: Olisemeka 18; Asts: Perry 5	Livestats	Pts: Akec 17; Rebs: Thomas 9 Asts: Boissy 4	Attendance: 6,876; Referees: Cameron Gelinas, Yann Vezo Davidson, Natascha Onono

May 11, 2024	Rivers Hoopers (Nigeria Basketball Federation)	78–71(2OT)	(Rwanda Basketball Federation) APR	Dakar Arena, Dakar
2:30 PM	Scoring by quarter: 16–19, 15–11, 10–20, 17–8, Overtime: 17–8, 20–3
	Pts: Eke 18; Rebs: Eke 20; Asts: Perry 6	Livestats	Pts: Nshobozwabyosenumukiza 16; Rebs: Hunt 14; Asts: Hunt 7	Attendance: 750; Referees: Cameron Gelinas, Aboolo Amr, Kalume Tonton Banza

May 12, 2024	Rivers Hoopers (Nigeria Basketball Federation)	62–73	(Tunisia Basketball Federation) US Monastir	Dakar Arena, Dakar
2:30 PM	Scoring by quarter: 13–19, 20–19, 9–18, 20–17
	Pts: Eke 13; Rebs: Olisemeka 10; Asts: Amayo 7	Livestats	Pts: Crawford 21; Rebs: Majok 16; Asts: Crawford 9	Attendance: 2,604; Referees: Kenny Jones, Kalume Tonton Banza, Walelign Fikadu Gebeto

==== Playoffs ====
===== Seeding game (3rd–4th seed) =====
25 May 2024	Rivers Hoopers (Nigeria)	57–63	(Senegal) AS Douanes	BK Arena, Kigali, Rwanda
5:30 PM	Scoring by quarter: 9–22, 14–15, 5–13, 29–13
	Pts: Ike 11; Rebs: Olisemeka 13; Asts: Amayo 7	Livestats	Pts: Harouna 16; Rebs: Akec, Fofana 7 Asts: Akec 4	Attendance: 5,992; Referees: Hortensia Sanchez-Carrizales, Wael Ibrahim Mostafa, Amir Taboubi

===== Quarterfinal =====
27 May 2024	Rivers Hoopers (Nigeria)	92–88	(Tunisia) US Monastir	BK Arena, Kigali, Rwanda
5:00 PM	Scoring by quarter: 20–21, 25–19, 23–22, 24–26
	Pts: Perry 33; Rebs: Eke 12; Asts: Amayo 11	Livestats	Pts: Crawford 31; Rebs: Majok 7 Asts: Crawford 10	Attendance: 3,032; Referees: Chelisa Painter, Wael Ibrahim Mostafa, Aboolo Amr

===== Semifinal =====
29 May 2024	Rivers Hoopers (Nigeria)	83–89(OT)	(Libya) Al Ahly Ly	BK Arena, Kigali, Rwanda
5:00 PM	Scoring by quarter: 21–27, 16–21, 23–8, 13–70, Overtime: 10–16
	Pts: Amayo 26; Rebs: Amayo 15; Asts: Amayo 6	Livestats	Pts: Lual-Acuil 27; Rebs: Deng 13; Asts: Golden 5	Attendance: 4,037; Referees: Chelisa Painter, Yann Vezo Davidson, Mbaye Seye

===== Third-place game =====
31 May 2024	Rivers Hoopers (Nigeria)	80–57	(South Africa) Cape Town Tigers	BK Arena, Kigali, Rwanda
8:00 PM	Scoring by quarter: 25–8, 18–21, 20–9, 17–19
	Pts: Amayo 25; Rebs: Koko 11; Asts: Perry 8	Livestats	Pts: Deing 17; Rebs: Sibanyoni 15; Asts: Manyang, Whitbread 2	Attendance: 4,379; Referees: Julian Scott, Wael Ibrahim Mostafa, Kalume Tonton Banza

== Player statistics ==
Legend
GP	Games played	GS	Games started	MPG	Minutes per game
FG%	Field-goal percentage	3P%	3-point field-goal percentage	FT%	Free-throw percentage
RPG	Rebounds per game	APG	Assists per game	SPG	Steals per game
BPG	Blocks per game	PPG	Points per game

=== BAL ===
Rivers Hoopers statistics
Player	GP	MPG	FG%	3FG%	FT%	RPG	APG	SPG	BPG	PPG
John Wilkins	10	26.0	.250	.232	.429	3.0	0.7	0.8	0.4	6.4
Will Perry	9	35.2	.443	.375	.919	4.2	5.4	2.3	0.1	17.2
Mustapha Oyebanji	9	8.0	.207	.231	.500	0.6	0.1	0.2	0.0	2.2
Peter Olisemeka	9	31.3	.536	.000	.516	12.2	2.1	2.0	1.2	10.0
Buchi Nwaiwu	7	5.9	.125	.000	.750	2.0	0.4	0.1	0.4	0.7
Victor Mohammed	2	3.7	.200	.000	.000	1.0	1.0	0.0	0.0	1.0
Victor Koko	10	8.7	.444	.000	.571	3.2	0.3	0.1	0.8	2.0
David Ike	10	14.7	.444	.500	.250	4.1	0.5	0.4	0.8	4.5
Devine Eke	10	36.1	.444	.182	.531	10.8	2.6	1.8	0.3	16.6
Michael Daramola	2	3.4	.000	.000	.500	0.5	0.5	0.0	0.0	0.5
Offia Abel Chidiebere	7	5.7	.263	.100	1.000	1.0	0.4	0.6	0.0	2.0
Johnson Anaiye	9	9.3	.176	.125	.500	1.6	1.4	1.1	0.0	1.2
Kelvin Amayo	10	37.0	.343	.227	.391	5.3	6.7	2.2	0.5	16.0
