= 2023–24 US Monastir basketball season =

US Monastir
2023–24 season
- Head coach: Mohamed Kirdani (BAL)
- Arena: Mohamed-Mzali Sports Hall
- Championnat Pro A: TBD
- BAL: 3rd in Sahara Conference
- Playoffs: Quarterfinals (eliminated by the Rivers Hoopers)
- Tunisian Cup: TBD

The 2023–24 season of the US Monastir basketball team is the 65th season in club history and will be the 4th season in the Basketball Africa League (BAL).

Monastir played in their fourth consecutive BAL season, and following a disappointing performance in the previous season, US Monastir brought in ex-players Ater Majok and Chris Crawford for the 2024 season. Monastir reached the playoffs again, but was eliminated in the quarterfinals by the Rivers Hoopers of Nigeria.

== Transactions ==
No.	Pos.	Nat.	Name	Age	Moving from		Ends	Date	Source
13	C	(South Sudan)	Ater Majok	33	Sagesse	(Lebanon)	Undisclosed	February 22, 2024	
14	G	(United States)	George Williams	33	Al Ittisalad	(Egypt)	Undisclosed	April 24, 2024	
24	G	(Mali)	Sadio Doucouré	31	Peja	(Kosovo)	Undisclosed	April 25, 2024	

== Roster ==
=== Current roster ===
Note: Flags indicate national team eligibility at FIBA-sanctioned events. Players may hold other non-FIBA nationalities not displayed.

2023–24 US Monastir roster
Players
Coaches

Pos.	No.	Nat.	Name	Ht.	Age
G	00	(Tunisia)	Bouallegue, Amrou	1.94 m (6 ft 4 in)	30 – 24 December 1995
G	1	(United States)	Crawford, Chris (I)	1.94 m (6 ft 4 in)	34 – 30 September 1992
G	2	(Tunisia)	Ganouni, Achraf	1.92 m (6 ft 4 in)	29 – 16 April 1997
C	4	(Tunisia)	Ghyaza, Mokhtar (C)	2.04 m (6 ft 8 in)	39 – 15 November 1986
G	5	(Tunisia)	Marmouch, Yassine	1.95 m (6 ft 5 in)	23 – 1 June 2003
SF	7	(Tunisia)	Marnaoui, Oussama	1.96 m (6 ft 5 in)	27 – 16 June 1999
SG	10	(Tunisia)	Chouaya, Lassaad	1.90 m (6 ft 3 in)	37 – 22 August 1989
G	12	(Tunisia)	Bedoui, Ahmed	1.98 m (6 ft 6 in)	19 – 28 July 2007
C	13	(South Sudan)	Majok, Ater (I)	2.10 m (6 ft 11 in)	39 – 4 July 1987
G	14	(United States)	Williams, George (I)	1.95 m (6 ft 5 in)	36 – 16 April 1990
F	15	(Tunisia)	Addami, Ahmed	1.88 m (6 ft 2 in)	29 – 14 July 1997
F	23	(Tunisia)	Lahyani, Firas	2.01 m (6 ft 7 in)	35 – 16 July 1991
SF	24	(Mali)	Doucouré, Sadio (I)	2.01 m (6 ft 7 in)	34 – 27 July 1992

Head coach

- (Egypt) Mohamed El Kirdani

Assistant coach(es)

- (Tunisia) M'hamed Gaddour

Legend

- (C) Team captain
- (I) Import player
- (E): BAL Elevate player
- Injured

- Roster
Updated: 4 May 2024

== Basketball Africa League ==
=== Sahara Conference ===
Pos	Team	Pld	W	L	PF	PA	PD	PCT	Qualification
1	(Nigeria) Rivers Hoopers	6	4	2	441	413	+28	.667	Advance to playoffs
2	(Senegal) AS Douanes (H)	6	3	3	409	385	+24	.500 (Note: Head-to-head: AS Douanes 1–1 US Monastir, AS Douanes won on aggregrate point difference (+1).)	Advance to playoffs
3	(Tunisia) US Monastir	6	3	3	437	450	−13	.500	Advance to playoffs
4	(Rwanda) APR	6	2	4	432	471	−39	.333	

Source: BAL
Rules for classification: Tiebreakers
(H) Hosts
Notes:

May 4, 2024	US Monastir (Tunisia Basketball Federation)	84–89(OT)	(Rwanda Basketball Federation) APR	Dakar Arena, Dakar
2:30 PM	Scoring by quarter: 20–20, 20–19, 15–13, 23–26, Overtime: 6–11
	Pts: Crawford 21; Rebs: Lahyani, Majok 9 Asts: Crawford 7	Livestats	Pts: Filer, Noel 24; Rebs: Abdullah 9 Asts: Filer 4	Attendance: 850; Referees: Kenny Jones, Yann Vezo Davidson, Kingsley Ojeaburu

May 5, 2024	AS Douanes (Fédération Sénégalaise de Basket-Ball)	76–59	(Tunisia Basketball Federation) US Monastir	Dakar Arena, Dakar
5:30 PM	Scoring by quarter: 12–17, 20–14, 14–15, 30–15
	Pts: Harouna 35; Rebs: Akec 9 Asts: Boissy 8	Livestats	Pts: Williams 16; Rebs: Majok 13; Asts: Crawford 5	Attendance: 4,578; Referees: Cameron Gelinas, Walelign Fikadu Gebeto, Natascha Onono

May 7, 2024	US Monastir (Tunisia Basketball Federation)	63–84	(Nigeria Basketball Federation) Rivers Hoopers	Dakar Arena, Dakar
4:00 PM	Scoring by quarter: 13–24, 16–25, 22–18, 12–17
	Pts: Doucouré 21; Rebs: Crawford 7 Asts: Crawford 14	Livestats	Pts: Amayo 30; Rebs: Eke 12; Asts: Amayo, Perry 9	Attendance: 973; Referees: Tyler Mirkovich, Kalume Tonton Banza, Hassan Kamate

May 9, 2024	APR (Rwanda Basketball Federation)	70–83	(Tunisia Basketball Federation) US Monastir	Dakar Arena, Dakar
4:00 PM	Scoring by quarter: 22–19, 15–17, 17–14, 16–33
	Pts: Hunt 17; Rebs: Filer 11; Asts: Noel 5	Livestats	Pts: Crawford 31; Rebs: Majok 10; Asts: Crawford 5	Attendance: 2,330; Referees: Cameron Gelinas, Kingsley Ojeaburu, Kalume Tonton Banza

May 11, 2024	US Monastir (Tunisia Basketball Federation)	75–69	(Fédération Sénégalaise de Basket-Ball) AS Douanes	Dakar Arena, Dakar
5:30 PM	Scoring by quarter: 17–15, 31–20, 10–15, 17–19
	Pts: Crawford 16; Rebs: Lahyani 10; Asts: Crawford 6	Livestats	Pts: Harouna 22; Rebs: Akec 7 Asts: Fofana 2	Attendance: 8,208; Referees: Tyler Mirkovich, Kingsley Ojeaburu, Natascha Onono

May 12, 2024	Rivers Hoopers (Nigeria Basketball Federation)	62–73	(Tunisia Basketball Federation) US Monastir	Dakar Arena, Dakar
2:30 PM	Scoring by quarter: 13–19, 20–19, 9–18, 20–17
	Pts: Eke 13; Rebs: Olisemeka 10; Asts: Amayo 7	Livestats	Pts: Crawford 21; Rebs: Majok 16; Asts: Crawford 9	Attendance: 2,604; Referees: Kenny Jones, Kalume Tonton Banza, Walelign Fikadu Gebeto

=== BAL playoffs ===
The playoffs will begin on 24 May 2024 with the seeding games and finish on 1 June 2024 with the final.

==== Seeding game (4th–5th seed) ====
25 May 2024	Petro de Luanda (Angola)	67–70	(Tunisia) US Monastir	BK Arena, Kigali, Rwanda
2:30 PM	Scoring by quarter: 13–16, 25–17, 16–19, 13–18
	Pts: Faust 12; Rebs: Gakou 8 Asts: Gonçalves 7	Livestats	Pts: Lahyani 19; Rebs: Lahyani 9 Asts: Crawford 11	Attendance: 2,663

==== Quarterfinal ====
27 May 2024	Rivers Hoopers (Nigeria)	92–88	(Tunisia) US Monastir	BK Arena, Kigali, Rwanda
5:00 PM	Scoring by quarter: 20–21, 25–19, 23–22, 24–26
	Pts: Perry 33; Rebs: Eke 12; Asts: Amayo 11	Livestats	Pts: Crawford 31; Rebs: Majok 7 Asts: Crawford 10	Attendance: 3,032; Referees: Chelisa Painter, Wael Ibrahim Mostafa, Aboolo Amr

== Player statistics ==
Legend
GP	Games played	GS	Games started	MPG	Minutes per game
FG%	Field-goal percentage	3P%	3-point field-goal percentage	FT%	Free-throw percentage
RPG	Rebounds per game	APG	Assists per game	SPG	Steals per game
BPG	Blocks per game	PPG	Points per game

US Monastir statistics
Player	GP	MPG	FG%	3FG%	FT%	RPG	APG	SPG	BPG	PPG
Chris Crawford	8	35.8	.420	.339	.938	4.5	9.0	1.3	0.4	19.0
Oussama Marnaoui	8	28.0	.353	.339	.800	2.8	1.6	1.3	0.1	12.5
Sadio Doucouré	7	20.1	.542	.429	.545	6.1	0.6	0.1	0.1	9.1
Firas Lahyani	8	22.9	.489	.429	.667	7.9	2.6	0.8	0.3	9.0
George Williams	8	16.7	.419	.357	.857	1.9	1.0	1.0	0.0	8.6
Ater Majok	8	30.8	.568	.000	.750	8.8	0.8	0.8	2.0	8.5
Achref Gannouni	8	23.1	.333	.222	.538	1.9	1.6	0.3	0.0	4.4
Lassaad Chouaya	8	13.3	.308	.250	.500	1.5	0.6	0.3	0.0	2.6
Ahmed Addami	4	7.5	.364	.167	.000	1.3	0.3	0.5	0.0	2.3
Amrou Bouallegue	2	11.5	.200	.000	.000	2.0	2.0	0.5	0.5	1.0
Mokhtar Ghyaza	8	7.1	.125	.000	.500	1.5	0.5	0.3	0.3	0.4
Avry Holmes^{≠}	2	5.2	.000	.000	.000	1.0	0.0	0.0	0.0	0.0

^{≠}Acquired during the season
^{~}Released during the season
