= 2024 BAL playoffs =

Playoffs of the 2024 BAL season

Tournament details
- Country: Rwanda
- City: Kigali
- Venue: BK Arena
- Dates: 24 May – 1 June 2024
- Teams: 8

Final positions
- Champions: (Angola) Petro de Luanda (1st title)
- Runners-up: (Libya) Al Ahly Ly
- Third place: (Nigeria) Rivers Hoopers
- Fourth place: (South Africa) Cape Town Tigers

Tournament statistics
- Matches played: 12

The 2024 BAL playoffs was the postseason tournament of the 2024 BAL season which determined the champions of the 4th Basketball Africa League (BAL) season. The playoffs began on 24 May 2024 with the seeding games and finished on 1 June 2024 with the final. For a fourth consecutive season, the playoffs were hosted in the BK Arena in Kigali. It was the first playoff season that included seeding games, that were used to determine the final match-ups in the quarterfinals.

The eight games in the 2024 BAL play-offs attracted an average attendance of 4,744. All eight games took place at the BK Arena in Kigali, Rwanda.

== Qualified teams ==
Al Ahly Ly, FUS Rabat and Rivers Hoopers made their playoff debuts. Al Ahly Ly and Rivers Hoopers were the first teams from Libya and Nigeria respectively, to play in the BAL playoffs.

Team	Conference	Record	Clinched		Playoff appearance
Team	Conference	Record	Playoff berth	Best record in conference	Playoff appearance
(Morocco) FUS Rabat	Kalahari	3–1	17 March	17 March	1st
(Angola) Petro de Luanda	Kalahari	2–2	17 March	—	4th
(Egypt) Al Ahly	Nile	5–1	26 April	27 April	2nd
(Libya) Al Ahly Ly	Nile	3–3	27 April	—	1st
(South Africa) Cape Town Tigers	Kalahari	1–3	27 April	—	3rd
(Nigeria) Rivers Hoopers	Sahara	4–2	11 May	11 May	1st
(Tunisia) US Monastir	Sahara	3–3	12 May	—	3rd
(Senegal) AS Douanes	Sahara	3–3	12 May	—	3rd

== Seeding games ==
=== Pre-seeding games ranking ===
To determine the match-ups the eight teams were ranked based on their performance across conference play. In accordance with FIBA regulations, only games between the three-highest ranked were used for the ranking.

Pos	Team	Pld	W	L	GF	GA	GD	PCT	Qualification
1	(Egypt) Al Ahly	4	4	0	363	313	+50	1.000	Qualification to 1st-2nd seed game
2	(Morocco) FUS Rabat	4	3	1	363	295	+68	.750	Qualification to 1st-2nd seed game
3	(Nigeria) Rivers Hoopers	4	2	2	277	260	+17	.500	Qualification to 3rd-4th seed game
4	(Senegal) AS Douanes	4	2	2	269	265	+4	.500	Qualification to 3rd-4th seed game
5	(Angola) Petro de Luanda	4	2	2	360	340	+20	.500	Qualification to 5th-6th seed game
6	(Tunisia) US Monastir	4	2	2	270	291	−21	.500	Qualification to 5th-6th seed game
7	(Libya) Al Ahly Ly	4	1	3	348	352	−4	.250	Qualification to 7th-8th seed game
8	(South Africa) Cape Town Tigers	4	1	3	305	346	−41	.250	Qualification to 7th-8th seed game

Source: BAL
Rules for classification: Teams ranked on 1) Win-loss record; 2) Head-to-head record; 3) Point differential in the games between the respective teams; 4) Number of points scored in the games between the respective teams; 5) Average point differential in all games against other teams in the Conference; 6) Average number of points scored in all games played against other teams in the Conference; 7) Drawing.

=== 7th–8th seed game ===
In the opener of the playoffs, Al Ahly Ly comfortably defeated the Cape Town Tigers in the first competitive match-up between the two teams. The first 15 points in the game were scored from three-point range. Trae Golden, who joined Al Ahly six days before the game as a replacement for Pierre Jackson, scored 21 points including five three-pointers. Tigers debutant Dhieu Deing led their losing effort with 21 points. Al Ahly Ly outrebounded Cape Town 53 to 36.

24 May 2024
5:00 PM

Livestats

Al Ahly Ly (Libya)	87–67	(South Africa) Cape Town Tigers
Scoring by quarter: 21–25, 26–16, 25–17, 15–18
Pts: Golden 21; Rebs: Lual-Acuil 8 Asts: Golden 9		Pts: Deing 21; Rebs: Sibanyoni 12; Asts: Cele, Diarra 5

BK Arena, Kigali, Rwanda
Attendance: 3,032
Referees: Pat O'Connell, Kingsley Ojeaburu, Annie Joyce Muchenu

=== 1st–2nd seed game ===
FUS Rabat defeated the defending champions Al Ahly, despite trailing by eight points (49–41) at halftime. Rabat used a 10–0 run to begin the fourth quarter to pull ahead. Aliou Diarra had his third double-double of the season with 21 points and 10 rebounds.

24 May 2024
8:00 PM

Livestats

Al Ahly (Egypt)	78–89	(Morocco) FUS Rabat
Scoring by quarter: 19–22, 30–19, 15–17, 14–31
Pts: Lyons 21; Rebs: Mitchell 9 Asts: Gendy 5		Pts: Diarra 21; Rebs: Diarra 10; Asts: Brown 5

BK Arena, Kigali, Rwanda
Attendance: 7,154
Referees: Julian Scott, Yann Vezo Davidson, Jean Sauveur Ruhamiriza

=== 5th–6th seed game ===
Petro de Luanda led the game by eight points going into the final five minutes, however, Monastir was able to use a 10–0 run to get ahead. With a tied game, Firas Lahyani scored a buzzer-beating game winner to give Monastir the win. Petro's Nick Faust made his debut with the team and led them with 12 points in the game.

25 May 2024
2:30 PM

Livestats

Petro de Luanda (Angola)	67–70	(Tunisia) US Monastir
Scoring by quarter: 13–16, 25–17, 16–19, 13–18
Pts: Faust 12; Rebs: Gakou 8 Asts: Gonçalves 7		Pts: Lahyani 19; Rebs: Lahyani 9 Asts: Crawford 11

BK Arena, Kigali, Rwanda
Attendance: 2,663
Referees: Chelisa Painter, Mbaye Seye, Kalume Tonton Banza

=== 3rd–4th seed game ===
AS Douanes dominated the first three quarters of the game, and was up by 22 points in the third quarter. Rivers Hoopers coach Ogoh Odaudu benched his starting five in the final quarter, and the Hoopers were able to have a 14–0 run to limit the loss margin to six points.

25 May 2024
5:30 PM

Livestats

Rivers Hoopers (Nigeria)	57–63	(Senegal) AS Douanes
Scoring by quarter: 9–22, 14–15, 5–13, 29–13
Pts: Ike 11; Rebs: Olisemeka 13; Asts: Amayo 7		Pts: Harouna 16; Rebs: Akec, Fofana 7 Asts: Akec 4

BK Arena, Kigali, Rwanda
Attendance: 5,992
Referees: Hortensia Sanchez-Carrizales, Wael Ibrahim Mostafa, Amir Taboubi

== Bracket ==
Quarterfinals
1	(Morocco) FUS Rabat	88
8	(South Africa) Cape Town Tigers (OT)	91
3	(Senegal) AS Douanes	65
6	(Angola) Petro de Luanda	66
2	(Egypt) Al Ahly	77
7	(Libya) Al Ahly Ly	86
4	(Nigeria) Rivers Hoopers	92
5	(Tunisia) US Monastir	88

Semifinals
8	(South Africa) Cape Town Tigers	86
6	(Angola) Petro de Luanda (OT)	96
7	(Libya) Al Ahly Ly (OT)	89
4	(Nigeria) Rivers Hoopers	83

Final
6	(Angola) Petro de Luanda	107
7	(Libya) Al Ahly Ly	94
Third place game
4	(Nigeria) Rivers Hoopers	80
8	(South Africa) Cape Town Tigers	57

== Quarterfinals ==
=== (2) Al Ahly vs. (7) Al Ahly Ly ===
Al Ahly Ly, who were missing Kevin Murphy, shot 0–4 from long range in the opening quarter and early in the second quarter Al Ahly was up by points. The Libyans, however, went into halftime up by two (36–38) following two Trae Golden threes. Al Ahly Ly managed to pull away in the third quarter and hang on to their lead to defeat the defending champions. Majok Deng contributed 25 points and 9 rebounds, Jo Lual-Acuil had his fourth double-double of the season with 23 points and 11 rebounds, and Golden had 23 points and 9 assists. The loss was Al Ahly's largest loss in BAL history.

26 May 2024
2:30 PM

Livestats

Al Ahly (Egypt)	77–86	(Libya) Al Ahly Ly
Scoring by quarter: 14–15, 22–23, 13–17, 28–31
Pts: Mitchell 17; Rebs: Oraby 6 Asts: Lyons 10		Pts: Deng 25; Rebs: Lual-Acuil 11; Asts: Golden 10

BK Arena, Kigali, Rwanda
Attendance: 2,775
Referees: Julian Scott, Jean Sauveur Ruhamiriza, Amir Taboubi

=== (1) FUS Rabat vs. (8) Cape Town Tigers ===
The two teams met again after facing each other in the Kalahari Conference, in which FUS Rabat won the series 2–0. Ngor Manyang hit a corner three-pointer at the buzzer to give the Tigers a three-point lead going into halftime. With 54 seconds in the game, FUS forward Baeri hit a three-pointer to cut the Tigers' lead to two points at 78–80. Then, Abdelhakim Zouita hit a jump hook to tie the game at 80–80 with 26 seconds remaining. Down three points, Samkelo Cele grabbed the rebound and scored a pull-up three point jumper to send the game to overtime. With the score at 88–90 for the Tigers, Mohamed Sylla went up for the dunk with 9.5 seconds remaining, but was blocked at the rim by Cele. At the free throw line, Cele expanded the lead to three points and John Jordan missed a three-pointer at half court to finish the game. Samkelo Cele finished with a game-high 30 points and 9 rebounds, while Nkosinathi Sibanyoni added 16 points and 25 rebounds, setting a new all-time BAL record for most rebounds in a single game. On FUS Rabat's side, Aliou Diarra had 18 points and 16 rebounds, while BAL Elevate player Mohamed Sylla had 15 points, 11 rebounds and 3 blocks for the losing side.

The Tigers reached their first semi-finals after three failed attempts, becoming the first South African side to achieve this feat.

26 May 2024
5:30 PM

Livestats

FUS Rabat (Morocco)	88–91 (OT)	(South Africa) Cape Town Tigers
Scoring by quarter: 17–15, 24–29, 18–19, 24–20, Overtime: 5–8
Pts: Diarra 18; Rebs: Diarra 16; Asts: Jordan 7		Pts: Cele 30; Rebs: Sibanyoni 25; Asts: Diarra 8

BK Arena, Kigali, Rwanda
Attendance: 6,279
Referees: Pat O'Connell, Aboolo Amr, Monicca Nassuunav

=== (4) Rivers Hoopers vs. (5) US Monastir ===
Will Perry scored 33 points on 9-from-15 shooting and Devine Eke recorded 16 points and 12 rebounds to help the Rivers Hoopers eliminate the former BAL champions US Monastir. The Hoopers trailed by one point in the first quarter, but from there never trailed again in the game and at one point they led by 12 points. Monastir was able to cut the league to five points with a Sadio Doucouré three with 20 seconds remaining, and a three-point game after George Williams hit another three-pointer. The Hoopers reached the semi-finals for the first time and were the first Nigerian team to qualify past the quarter-finals.

27 May 2024
5:00 PM

Livestats

Rivers Hoopers (Nigeria)	92–88	(Tunisia) US Monastir
Scoring by quarter: 20–21, 25–19, 23–22, 24–26
Pts: Perry 33; Rebs: Eke 12; Asts: Amayo 11		Pts: Crawford 31; Rebs: Majok 7 Asts: Crawford 10

BK Arena, Kigali, Rwanda
Attendance: 3,032
Referees: Chelisa Painter, Wael Ibrahim Mostafa, Aboolo Amr

=== (3) AS Douanes vs. (6) Petro de Luanda ===
In a rematch of the 2023 semifinals, Petro de Luanda and AS Douanes faced off in the final quarter-final game. Douanes pulled away in the third quarter behind three-pointers and a lay-up by Jean Jacques Boissy, followed by a three by Abdoulaye Harouna to close off the quarter with a 14-point lead. In the fourth quarter, Petro rallied back and Nick Faust hit a lay-up to cut the lead to three with 1:10 to go in the game. Then, Faust hit an off-the-dribble corner three to tie the game with just 38.5 seconds remaining. Douanes then hit a free throw to gain a one-point lead, however, Harouna lost the ball while bringing up the ball which opened up the court for Petro on a last possession. Gerson Gonçalves picked up the ball at half court and passed to Faust who hit a wide-open lay-up with eight points left that sealed the game. Faust finished with a team-high 13 points for Petro.

27 May 2024
8:00 PM

Livestats

AS Douanes (Senegal)	65–66	(Angola) Petro de Luanda
Scoring by quarter: 8–13, 17–15, 31–14, 9–24
Pts: Boissy 28; Rebs: Akec, Diakhite 9 Asts: Harouna 5		Pts: Faust 13; Rebs: Moreira 9 Asts: Buiamba 5

BK Arena, Kigali, Rwanda
Attendance: 5,470
Referees: Hortensia Sanchez-Carrizales, Kingsley Ojeaburu, Monicca Nassuuna

== Semifinals ==
Three teams played in their first-ever BAL semifinals, while Petro de Luanda became the first team to qualify for four semifinals in a row.

=== (4) Rivers Hoopers vs. (7) Al Ahly Ly ===
Jo Lual-Acuil led the way for Al Ahly Ly with 27 points and 7 rebounds, while Trae Golden added 20 points, to defeat the Rivers Hoopers in overtime in the first semifinal. The Libyans led by as much as 16 points in the second quarter, but saw the Hoopers take the lead for the majority of the fourth quarter. Al Ahly Ly turned the ball over 23 times and hit only 2 out of 18 three-pointers, however, the Hoopers struggled to convert on free throws (9-for-20) to take advantage. Devine Eke had 25 points and 12 rebounds; Kelvin Amayo had 26 points and 15 rebounds for the Hoopers' losing effort. Al Ahly Ly qualified for the finals in its debut season.

29 May 2024
5:00 PM

Livestats

Rivers Hoopers (Nigeria)	83–89 (OT)	(Libya) Al Ahly Ly
Scoring by quarter: 21–27, 16–21, 23–8, 13–70, Overtime: 10–16
Pts: Amayo 26; Rebs: Amayo 15; Asts: Amayo 6		Pts: Lual-Acuil 27; Rebs: Deng 13; Asts: Golden 5

BK Arena, Kigali, Rwanda
Attendance: 4,037
Referees: Chelisa Painter, Yann Vezo Davidson, Mbaye Seye

=== (8) Cape Town Tigers vs. (6) Petro de Luanda ===
Petro de Luanda tied a season record with 15 three-pointers to beat the Cape Town Tigers after overtime. In the final minutes, Petro de Luanda was able to create a gap after Nick Faust was fouled on a three-point attempt and hit three straight free throws. Petro's Yanick Moreira fouled Nkosinathi Sibanyoni on his defensive rebound which brought him to the free throw line with 2.5 seconds to go. Sibanyoni hit the first free throw to cut the lead to two and, subsequently, he missed the second free throw, however, Samkelo Cele was able to grab the offensive rebound and was fouled by Castro on the lay-up attempt. Cele went on to hit two clutch free throws to tie the game. Gerson Gonçalves missed a long shot which sent the game to overtime. Petro started the overtime with an 8–0 run and behind Jone Pedro who scored four points and had three blocks in the extra period, they managed to hold on to the lead. Faust led Petro with a game-high 23 points, while the team's bench contributed 57 points, outscoring the Tigers bench by a wide margin. For the losing side, Cele had 19 points.

29 May 2024
8:00 PM

Livestats

Petro de Luanda (Angola)	96–86 (OT)	(South Africa) Cape Town Tigers
Scoring by quarter: 15–16, 28–21, 23–18, 11–22, Overtime: 19–9
Pts: Faust 23; Rebs: Moreira 14; Asts: Dundão 7		Pts: Cele 19; Rebs: Sibanyoni 13; Asts: Diarra 6

BK Arena, Kigali, Rwanda
Attendance: 6,072
Referees: Pat O'Connell, Kalume Tonton Banza, Annie Joyce Muchenu

== Third place game ==
The Rivers Hoopers and Cape Town Tigers faced each other for the first time. Earlier that day, Hoopers coach Ogoh Odaudu was awarded with the BAL Coach of the Year honor. The Tigers missed their two leading scorers Samkelo Cele and Cartier Diarra, and the Hoopers led throughout the whole game, at one point by as much as 28 points. The third place was the best result in Hoopers international history.

31 May 2024
8:00 PM

Livestats

Rivers Hoopers (Nigeria)	80–57	(South Africa) Cape Town Tigers
Scoring by quarter: 25–8, 18–21, 20–9, 17–19
Pts: Amayo 25; Rebs: Koko 11; Asts: Perry 8		Pts: Deing 17; Rebs: Sibanyoni 15; Asts: Manyang, Whitbread 2

BK Arena, Kigali, Rwanda
Attendance: 4,379
Referees: Julian Scott, Wael Ibrahim Mostafa, Kalume Tonton Banza

== Final ==
1 June 2024
4:00 PM

Livestats

Petro de Luanda (Angola)	107–94	(Libya) Al Ahly Ly
Scoring by quarter: 26–24, 14–28, 35–23, 32–19
Pts: Faust 24; Rebs: Gonçalves 8 Asts: Gonçalves 8		Pts: Deng 24; Rebs: Lual-Acuil 9 Asts: Golden 8

BK Arena, Kigali, Rwanda
Attendance: 6,404
Referees: Hortencia Sánchez, Yann Davidson, Jean Sauveur Ruhamiriza
