= 2024 AS Douanes men's basketball season =

AS Douanes
- Chairman: Colonel Cheikh Diop
- Head coach: Pabi Guèye
- NM1: Semifinalist (eliminated by ASCVD)
- BAL: 2nd in Sahara Conference
- Playoffs: Quarter-finalist (eliminated by Petro de Luanda)
- Senegalese Cup: Unknown
- Saint Michel Cup: In progres

The AS Douanes men's basketball team played the 2024 season in the Nationale 1 (NM1) and the Basketball Africa League (BAL).

The Douanes are the defending champions of the NM1, and were coming off their silver medal performance in the 2023 BAL season. In the 2024 BAL season, they finished second in the Sahara Conference and were the number three seed in the playoffs. In the quarter-finals, they were eliminated by Petro de Luanda.

In the 2024 Nationale 1 season, the Gabelous were eliminated in the semi-finals, missing out on the finals for the first time in eight seasons.

== Rosters ==
The final roster for the BAL season was announced on 30 April 2024.

=== BAL roster ===
Note: Flags indicate national team eligibility at FIBA-sanctioned events. Players may hold other non-FIBA nationalities not displayed.

AS Douanes roster
Players
Coaches

Pos.	No.	Nat.	Name	Ht.	Age
G	00	(Senegal)	Ndour, Alkaly	1.93 m (6 ft 4 in)	28 – 2 March 1997
G	2	(Senegal)	Fall, Samba Daly	1.96 m (6 ft 5 in)	26 – 17 January 1999
G	5	(Senegal)	Boissy, Jean Jacques	1.86 m (6 ft 1 in)	25 – 28 January 2000
PF	6	(Senegal)	Thomas, Ibrahima	2.13 m (7 ft 0 in)	38 – 7 February 1987
F/C	7	(Nigeria)	Obekpa, Chris (I)	2.08 m (6 ft 10 in)	31 – 14 November 1993
G	10	(Niger)	Harouna, Amadou (I)	1.96 m (6 ft 5 in)	32 – 12 December 1992
PF	11	(Senegal)	Diop, Bara	2.01 m (6 ft 7 in)	32 – 14 August 1992
F	13	(Ivory Coast)	Fofana, Mike (I)	2.06 m (6 ft 9 in)	28 – 10 May 1997
SF	14	(Senegal)	Mboup, Khadim (E)	2.06 m (6 ft 9 in)	18 – 14 September 2006
C	15	(Nigeria)	Ochereobia, Ifeanyichukwu (I)	2.03 m (6 ft 8 in)	35 – 27 July 1989
C	28	(Senegal)	Diakhite, Adama	2.06 m (6 ft 9 in)	28 – 12 April 1997
F/C	34	(Senegal)	Sy, Abdou	2.11 m (6 ft 11 in)	22 – 13 January 2003
SF	45	(South Sudan)	Akec, Madut (I)	2.01 m (6 ft 7 in)	26 – 1 January 1999

Head coach

- (Senegal) Pabi Gueye

Assistant coach(es)

- (Senegal) Parfait Advijon
- (United States) JP Adams

Legend

- (C) Team captain
- (I) Import player
- (E): BAL Elevate player
- Injured

- Roster
Updated: May 5, 2024

== Transactions ==
=== In ===
No.	Pos.	Nat.	Name	Age	Moving from		Type	Ends	Date	Source
–	PF	(Senegal)	Babacar Diallo		Jeanne d'Arc	(Senegal)	Free agent	Undisclosed	23 December 2023	
–	C	(Senegal)	Ndery Khoulé		Louga	(Senegal)	Free agent	Undisclosed	23 December 2023	
–	SF	(Senegal)	Alioune Ass Seck		DUC	(Senegal)	Free agent	Undisclosed	23 December 2023	
–	SG	(Niger)	Abdoulaye Harouna	22	ABC Fighters	(Ivory Coast)	Free agent	Undisclosed	28 December 2023	
–	G/F	(Senegal)	Bassirou Bâ	27	DUC	(Senegal)	Free agent	2024	28 December 2023	
–	F	(Senegal)	Birahim Gaye	36			Free agent	Undisclosed	20 January 2024	
–	G/F	(Senegal)	Abdou Karim Kébé	26	ASC Ville de Dakar	(Senegal)	Free agent	Undisclosed	19 January 2024	
–	PG	(Senegal)	Pape Ibrahima Nidaye		ASC Ville de Dakar	(Senegal)	Free agent	Undisclosed	19 January 2024	
–	PF	(Senegal)	Doudou Ndoye		Jeanne d'Arc	(Senegal)	Free agent	Undisclosed	19 January 2024	
–	PF	(Ivory Coast)	Mike Fofana	26	ABC Fighters	(Ivory Coast)	Free agent	Undisclosed	8 March 2024	
–	C	(Senegal)	Ibrahima Thomas	36	Champville	(Lebanon)	Free agent	Undisclosed	5 March 2024	

=== Out ===
No.	Pos.	Nat.	Name	Age	Moving to		Type	Date	Source
5	G	(Senegal)	Jean Jacques Boissy	22	Aurore Vitré	(France)	End of contract	22 June 2023	
1	SG	(United States)	Chris Crawford	31	Al Ahli Benghazi	(Libya)	End of contract	October 2023	
11	PF/C	(Ghana)	Bryan Osei	35			End of contract	28 May 2023	
4	C	(South Sudan)	Khaman Maluach	17	NBA Academy Africa	(Senegal)	End of contract	29 May 2023	
34	C	(Nigeria)	Ifeanyichukwu Ochereobia	34			End of contract	29 May 2023	
15	C	(Senegal)	Mouhamadou Diagne	26			End of contract		

== Games ==
=== Nationale 1 ===
==== Regular season ====
4 February 2024	US Ouakam	59–63	AS Douanes	Dakar
				Arena: Marius Ndiaye Stadium

6 February 2024	ASCVD	vs.	AS Douanes	Dakar
				Arena: Marius Ndiaye Stadium

11 February 2024	AS Douanes	70–63	GBA	Dakar
				Arena: Marius Ndiaye Stadium

15 February 2024	Bopp	50–57	AS Douanes	Dakar
				Arena: Marius Ndiaye Stadium

25 February 2024	AS Douanes	71–67	ASCVD	Dakar
				Arena: Marius Ndiaye Stadium

1 March 2024	AS Douanes	52–46	USCT Port	Dakar
				Arena: Marius Ndiaye Stadium

9 March 2024	UGB	58–67	AS Douanes	Dakar
				Arena: Joseph Gaye Stadium

15 March 2024	Sibac	55–60	AS Douanes	Dakar
				Arena: Joseph Gaye Stadium

20 March 2024	USCT Port	66–69	AS Douanes	Dakar
				Arena: Marius Ndiaye Stadium

30 March 2024	AS Douanes	73–58	US Ouakam	Dakar
				Arena: Marius Ndiaye Stadium

6 April 2024	GBA	61–68	AS Douanes	Dakar
				Arena: Marius Ndiaye Stadium

17 April 2024	AS Douanes	61–52	Sibac	Dakar
				Arena: Marius Ndiaye Stadium

21 April 2024	AS Douanes	74–65	Bopp	Dakar
				Arena: Marius Ndiaye Stadium

25 April 2024	AS Douanes	vs.	UGB	Dakar
				Arena: Marius Ndiaye Stadium

=== Coupe du Maire ===
==== Quarterfinal ====
28 February 2024	AS Douanes	83–56	USCT Port	Dakar
				Arena: Marius Ndiaye Stadium

==== Semifinal ====
13 April 2024	AS Douanes	53–58	ASC Ville de Dakar	Dakar
				Arena: Stadium Marius Ndiaye

=== BAL ===
==== Sahara Conference ====
Pos	Team	Pld	W	L	PF	PA	PD	PCT	Qualification
1	(Nigeria) Rivers Hoopers	6	4	2	441	413	+28	.667	Advance to playoffs
2	(Senegal) AS Douanes (H)	6	3	3	409	385	+24	.500 (Note: Head-to-head: AS Douanes 1–1 US Monastir, AS Douanes won on aggregrate point difference (+1).)	Advance to playoffs
3	(Tunisia) US Monastir	6	3	3	437	450	−13	.500	Advance to playoffs
4	(Rwanda) APR	6	2	4	432	471	−39	.333	

Source: BAL
Rules for classification: Tiebreakers
(H) Hosts
Notes:

May 4, 2024 1	AS Douanes (Senegal)	68–77	(Nigeria) Rivers Hoopers	Dakar Arena, Dakar
5:30 PM	Scoring by quarter: 23–18, 16–19, 9–19, 20–21
	Pts: Akec 19; Rebs: Obekpa 14; Asts: Boissy 4	Livestats	Pts: Eke 31; Rebs: Eke 12; Asts: Amayo 8	Attendance: 8,543; Referees: Tyler Mirkovich, Aboolo Amr, Hassan Kamate

May 5, 2024 2	AS Douanes (Senegal)	76–59	(Tunisia) US Monastir	Dakar Arena, Dakar
5:30 PM	Scoring by quarter: 12–17, 20–14, 14–15, 30–15
	Pts: Harouna 35; Rebs: Akec 9 Asts: Boissy 8	Livestats	Pts: Williams 16; Rebs: Majok 13; Asts: Crawford 5	Attendance: 4,578; Referees: Cameron Gelinas, Walelign Fikadu Gebeto, Natascha Onono

May 7, 2024 3	APR (Rwanda)	66–61	(Senegal) AS Douanes	Dakar Arena, Dakar
7:00 PM	Scoring by quarter: 11–17, 16–9, 19–16, 20–19
	Pts: Noel 24; Rebs: Noel 8 Asts: Filer, Robeyns 3	Livestats	Pts: Boissy 14; Rebs: Boissy, Fofana 6 Asts: Boissy 11	Attendance: 4,478; Referees: Kenny Jones, Aboolo Amr, Adlen Larouci

May 9, 2024 4	Rivers Hoopers (Nigeria)	54–56	(Senegal) AS Douanes	Dakar Arena, Dakar
7:00 PM	Scoring by quarter: 5–14, 21–19, 15–7, 13–16
	Pts: Perry 17; Rebs: Olisemeka 18; Asts: Perry 5	Livestats	Pts: Akec 17; Rebs: Thomas 9 Asts: Boissy 4	Attendance: 6,876; Referees: Cameron Gelinas, Yann Vezo Davidson, Natascha Onono

May 11, 2024 5	US Monastir (Tunisia)	75–69	(Senegal) AS Douanes	Dakar Arena, Dakar
5:30 PM	Scoring by quarter: 17–15, 31–20, 10–15, 17–19
	Pts: Crawford 16; Rebs: Lahyani 10; Asts: Crawford 6	Livestats	Pts: Harouna 22; Rebs: Akec 7 Asts: Fofana 2	Attendance: 8,208; Referees: Tyler Mirkovich, Kingsley Ojeaburu, Natascha Onono

May 12, 2024 6	AS Douanes (Senegal)	79–54	(Rwanda) APR	Dakar Arena, Dakar
5:30 PM	Scoring by quarter: 23–18, 21–10, 19–18, 16–8
	Pts: Fofana 27; Rebs: Akec 9 Asts: Harouna 8	Livestats	Pts: Mpoyo 22; Rebs: Mpoyo 7 Asts: Robeyns 4	Attendance: 8,632; Referees: Kaitlynn Versoza, Yann Vezo Davidson, Hassan Kamate

==== Playoffs ====
===== Seeding game =====
25 May 2024	Rivers Hoopers (Nigeria)	57–63	(Senegal) AS Douanes	BK Arena, Kigali, Rwanda
5:30 PM	Scoring by quarter: 9–22, 14–15, 5–13, 29–13
	Pts: Ike 11; Rebs: Olisemeka 13; Asts: Amayo 7	Livestats	Pts: Harouna 16; Rebs: Akec, Fofana 7 Asts: Akec 4	Attendance: 5,992; Referees: Hortensia Sanchez-Carrizales, Wael Ibrahim Mostafa, Amir Taboubi

===== Quarterfinals =====
27 May 2024	AS Douanes (Senegal)	65–66	(Angola) Petro de Luanda	BK Arena, Kigali, Rwanda
8:00 PM	Scoring by quarter: 8–13, 17–15, 31–14, 9–24
	Pts: Boissy 28; Rebs: Akec, Diakhite 9 Asts: Harouna 5	Livestats	Pts: Faust 13; Rebs: Moreira 9 Asts: Buiamba 5	Attendance: 5,470; Referees: Hortensia Sanchez-Carrizales, Kingsley Ojeaburu, Monicca Nassuuna

== Player statistics ==
Legend
GP	Games played	GS	Games started	MPG	Minutes per game
FG%	Field-goal percentage	3P%	3-point field-goal percentage	FT%	Free-throw percentage
RPG	Rebounds per game	APG	Assists per game	SPG	Steals per game
BPG	Blocks per game	PPG	Points per game

After all games.

AS Douanes statistics
Player	GP	MPG	FG%	3FG%	FT%	RPG	APG	SPG	BPG	PPG
Abdoulaye Harouna	8	33.7	.289	.292	.767	2.8	3.4	4.0	0.1	17.1
Jean Jacques Boissy	8	28.7	.310	.091	.656	5.0	4.9	1.9	0.0	10.9
Madut Akec	8	33.6	.457	.526	.571	8.5	2.3	1.5	0.5	12.0
Mike Fofana	8	28.7	.420	.333	.895	4.9	1.5	1.0	0.3	10.6
Adama Diakhite	8	21.5	.500	.000	.652	5.6	0.3	0.8	0.8	7.9
Alkaly Ndour	8	11.9	.200	.000	.500	1.8	1.8	0.8	0.3	0.9
Ibrahima Thomas	7	15.3	.150	.125	.500	4.0	0.6	0.4	0.4	2.6
Samba Daly Fall	7	9.6	.320	.222	.000	2.3	0.4	0.4	0.3	2.6
Chris Obekpa	7	16.7	.313	.000	.750	4.3	0.6	0.1	0.7	1.9
Abdou Sy	1	3.2	.000	.000	.000	0.0	1.0	0.0	0.0	0.0
Bara Diop	2	2.5	.250	.000	.000	0.5	0.0	0.0	0.0	1.0
Khadim Rassoul Mboup	2	4.7	.500	.000	1.000	1.0	0.0	0.0	0.0	3.0
Michael Ochereobia	3	8.5	.143	.000	.375	1.3	0.0	0.0	0.0	1.7
