= Acuil =

Acuil is a South Sudanese surname. Notable people with the surname include:

- Awut Deng Acuil, South Sudanese politician
- Jo Lual-Acuil (born 1994), South Sudanese basketball player
- Joseph Lual Acuil (born 1948), South Sudanese politician and civil servant
