= All-BAL Team =

Annual Basketball Africa League award

The All-First Team is an annual Basketball Africa League (BAL) honor bestowed on the best players in the league following every BAL season. The first selections were announced on 4 June 2021 after the inaugural season. Thus far, fifteen players from eight different teams have been named to the all-league team.

In the first three seasons, the league announced just one all-BAL team, however, in 2024 a second-team honor was added.

== Selections ==
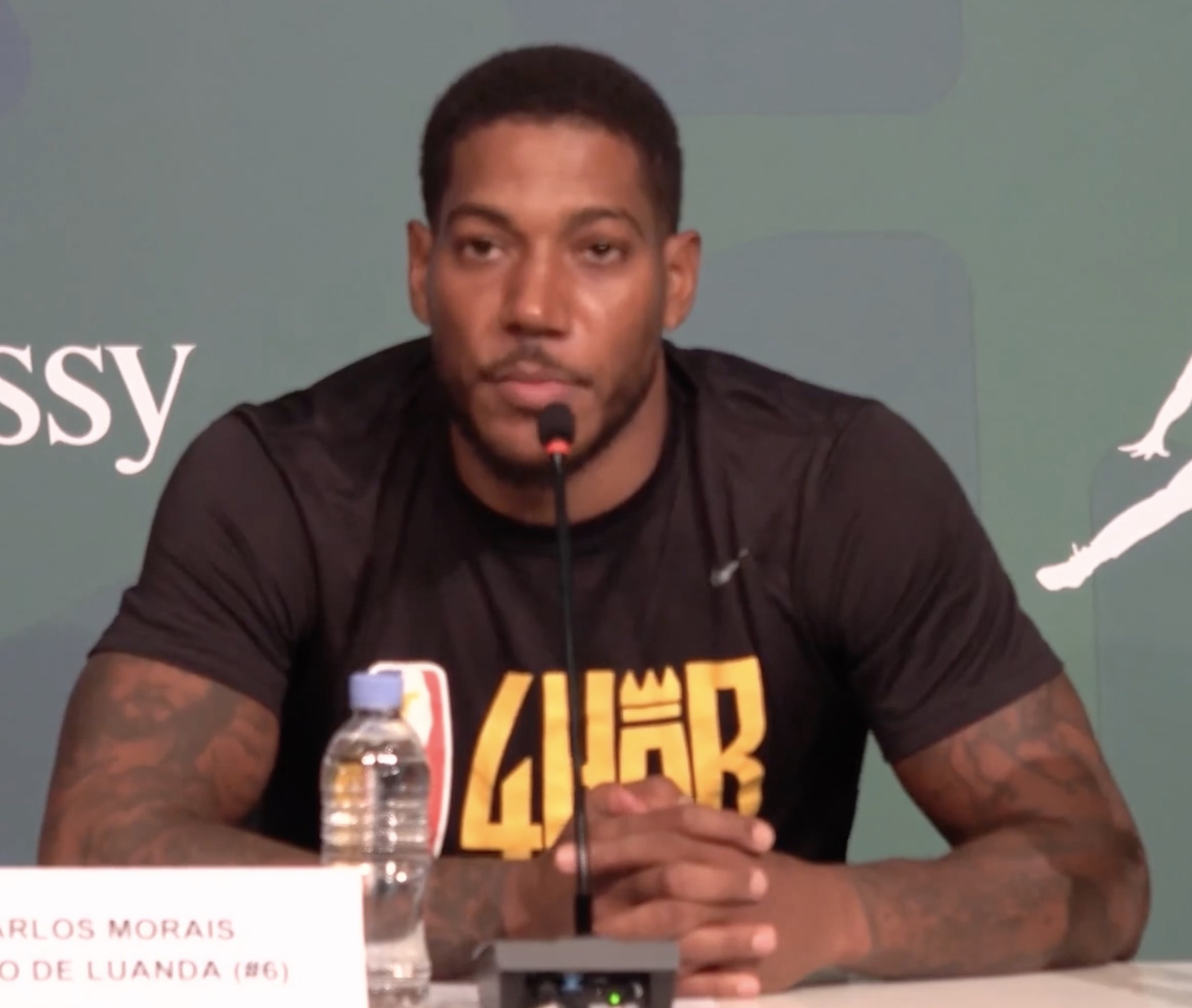
Carlos Morais was selected to the 2022 team

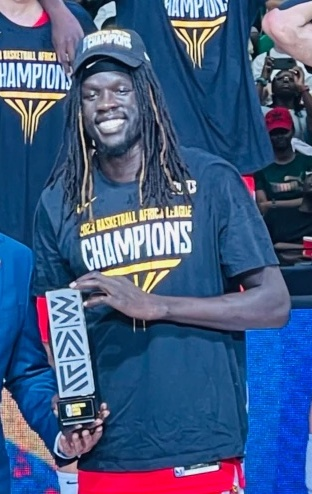
Nuni Omot was selected to the 2023 team

^	Denotes players who are still active in the BAL
*	Elected to the Naismith Memorial Basketball Hall of Fame
Player (X)	Denotes the number of times the player has been selected
**Player** **(in bold text)**	Indicates the player who won the BAL Most Valuable Player in the same year

=== 2021 to 2023 ===
From 2021 to 2023, the BAL announced the first team selection.

Season	Pos.	Player	Team	Ref.
2021	G	**Walter Hodge**	Zamalek	
2021	G	Wael Arakji	US Monastir	
2021	G	Omar Abada	US Monastir	
2021	F	Makrem Ben Romdhane	US Monastir	
2021	C	Anas Mahmoud	Zamalek	
2022 (Note: In the 2022 season, the BAL Most Valuable Player was not in the First Team, as Michael Dixon was not selected.)	G	Édgar Sosa	Zamalek	
2022	G	Terrell Stoglin	AS Salé	
2022	F	Carlos Morais	Petro de Luanda	
2022	F	Radhouane Slimane	US Monastir	
2022	C	Ater Majok^	US Monastir	
2023	G	Chris Crawford^	AS Douanes	
2023	G	Jean Jacques Boissy^	AS Douanes	
2023	F	Dane Miller Jr.^	SLAC	
2023	F	**Nuni Omot**^	Al Ahly	
2023	C	Aliou Diarra^	Stade Malien	

=== 2024–present ===
Season	First team		Second team		Ref.
Season	Player	Team	Player	Team	Ref.
2024	Chris Crawford (2)	US Monastir	Abdoulaye Harouna^	AS Douanes	
2024	Will Perry^	Rivers Hoopers	Ehab Amin	Al Ahly	
2024	Samkelo Cele^	Cape Town Tigers	Kelvin Amayo^	Rivers Hoopers	
2024	**Jo Lual-Acuil^**	Al Ahly Ly	Devine Eke	Rivers Hoopers	
2024	Aliou Diarra (2)^	FUS Rabat	Majok Deng^	Al Ahly Ly	
2025	**Jean Jacques Boissy (2)^**	Al Ahli Tripoli	Mohamed Sadi^	Al Ahli Tripoli	
2025	Jaylen Adams^	Al Ahli Tripoli	Babacar Sané	US Monastir	
2025	Majok Deng (2)^	Al Ittihad Alexandria	Ivan Almeida	Kriol Star	
2025	Patrick Gardner^	Petro de Luanda	Taefale Lenard	MBB	
2025	Aliou Diarra (3)^	APR	Youssou Ndoye	APR	
2026	Childe Dundão	Petro de Luanda	Omar Abada (2)^	Club Africain	
2026	**Craig Randall II^**	RSSB Tigers	Zach Lofton^	Al Ahly	
2026	Donovan Williams	Al Ahly Ly	Kevin Murphy^	Al Ahly	
2026	Majok Deng (3)^	Al Ahly Ly	Aboubakar Gakou^	Petro de Luanda	
2026	Mangok Mathiang^	APR	Jo Lual-Acuil (2)^	Al Ahly Ly	

== Statistics ==
=== By player ===
Player	Selections	First team	Second team	Seasons
Aliou Diarra	3	3	0	3
Majok Deng	3	2	1	3
Omar Abada	2	2	0	4
Chris Crawford	2	2	0	4
Jean Jacques Boissy	2	2	0	3
Jo Lual-Acuil	2	1	1	2
