= Lycée de Kigali =

School in Kigali, Rwanda

Coordinates: 1.9618°S 30.0681°E

Lycee de Kigali
- LDK

Lycée de Kigali (LDK) is a secondary school in Kiyovu Cell, Nyarugenge Sector, Nyarugenge District, Kigali, Rwanda. It has A Level and O Level tracks. In 1974 the French government established the school, and it opened officially in 1975 and the Rwandan government took charge of the school in 1982. Lycée de Kigali celebrated 40 years of its existence on Friday July 31, 2015.

The school currently has over 6,000 boys and girls in its alumni.

As of 2019, LDK accommodated over 1,400 students for both O and A levels. This school is partnership between Government of Rwanda and Parents.

== School motto ==
"Strive to excel"

== School Vision ==
To be the center of Excellency enlightened and dignified ladies and gentlemen rooted in academic standards.

== School Mission ==
"To provide capable high quality academics through teamwork and to address world trends"
