= Joseph Lual Acuil =

Minister Joseph Lual Acuil Lual (born 1948), also written as Joseph Lual Achuil, is a South Sudanese politician and civil servant.

== Background ==
Joseph Lual is born in 1948 near Kuajok, where he completed primary school in 1957. He attended secondary school at Ricks Institute in Liberia and received in 1973 a degree in Business Administration at the University of Liberia. From 1973 to 1978 Mr. Lual was a teacher at Ricks Institute, after which he joined the Liberian Ministry of Finance as a senior tax officer.

== Career ==
In the early 1980s, he returned to Sudan and worked for the Bahr el Ghazal state administration till 1989. In the following ten years Mr Lual worked for the Sudanese Red Crescent Society and the administrations of Gogrial province and Warrap State. In 1999 he joined the World Food Programme (WFP) in South Sudan, where he was a senior national officer till June 2010, when he was appointed National Minister of Humanitarian Affairs and Disaster Management based in Khartoum for the Republic of Sudan. After Independence of South Sudan he joined the South Sudanese government in the same role as Minister of Humanitarian Affairs and Disaster Management till 23 July 2013, when President Salva Kiir relieved all ministers and re-configured the ministries. In May 2015 Joseph Lual Acuil was appointed by President Salva Kiir as Head of the National Communications Authority.

On 22 May 2021, he was appointed to the parliament of South Sudan, taking the place of Afekeru Animu Risasi, who was expelled after being accused of being a Ugandan citizen.

== Personal life ==
He is the father of professional basketball player, Jo Lual-Acuil.
