= Axel Mpoyo =

Rwandan basketball player (born 1997)

No. 7 – RSSB Tigers
- Position: Small forward
- League: BAL; RBL

Personal information
- Born: January 5, 1997 (age 29) Kinshasa, Zaire
- Listed height: 2.03 m (6 ft 8 in)

Career information
- High school: Northeastern Junior College (Sterling, Colorado)
- College: Grambling State (2015–2017)
- Playing career: 2019–present

Career history
- 2019–2020: APOEL
- 2020: Trepça
- 2022–2023: REG
- 2023–2024: Pico FC
- 2022–2026: APR
- 2026–present: RSSB Tigers

Career highlights
- BAL champion (2026); 3× RBL champion (2022–2024); RBL Most Valuable Player (2022)

Axel Mpoyo (born January 5, 1997) is a Rwandan basketball player who plays for APR of the Rwanda Basketball League (RBL) and Basketball Africa League (BAL). He also plays for the Rwanda national team.

== Early life ==
Mpoyo was born in Kinshasa, Zaire, to a Congolese father and Rwandese mother. He has two brothers and a sister. He left the country at an early age for the United States, and attended Meridian High School in Idaho. At Meridian, he also tried football and track running, before opting to pursue basketball after growing to 6 ft 4 in (1.93 m).

== College career ==
Mpoyo played collegiate with Grambling State University, playing for the Tigers basketball team.

== Professional career ==
In his rookie year, Mpoyo played for Cypriot team APOEL in the Cyprus Basketball Division A. He did not finish the season with the team, as he transferred to KB Trepça in Kosovo mid-season.

Mpoyo played with Rwandan team REG starting from the 2021–22 season. He helped REG win the 2021–22 league title, and was named MVP. played with them in the Basketball Africa League (BAL) in the 2023 and 2024 seasons.

In October 2022, Mpoyo joined the Rwandan team APR of the Rwanda Basketball League (RBL). He helped them win the RBL title in 2023 and 2024.

In the 2023–24 season, Mpoyo played in Argentina with Pico FC.

On June 13, 2025, Mpoyo scored 10 three-point field goals in the third place game of the 2025 BAL season, setting a then Basketball Africa League (BAL) record. He surpassed the record set by Will Perry, who had scored nine three-pointers. Mpoyo's performance helped APR win the game, setting a league record in most points in a game with 123 and finishing in third place. His record was surpassed by Craig Randall II on April 4, 2026.

== National team career ==
Mpoyo has represented the Rwanda national team, and has played with the team at FIBA AfroBasket 2021, as well as in other qualifying tournaments.
