= Amadou Harouna =

Nigerien footballer

Personal information
- Date of birth: 25 March 1994 (age 32)
- Place of birth: Niamey, Niger
- Position: Defender

Team information
- Current team: Nigelec

Senior career*
Years	Team	Apps	(Gls)
2014–2015	Tsunami		
2015–2016	Renaissance		
2016–2019	Olympic		
2019–	Nigelec		

International career^{‡}
2019–	Niger	6	(0)
- * Club domestic league appearances and goals as of 26 April 2021 ‡ National team caps and goals as of 26 April 2021

Amadou Harouna (born 25 March 1994) is a Nigerien football defender who plays for Nigelec.
