= Abdoulaye Harouna =

Nigerien basketball player (born 1992)

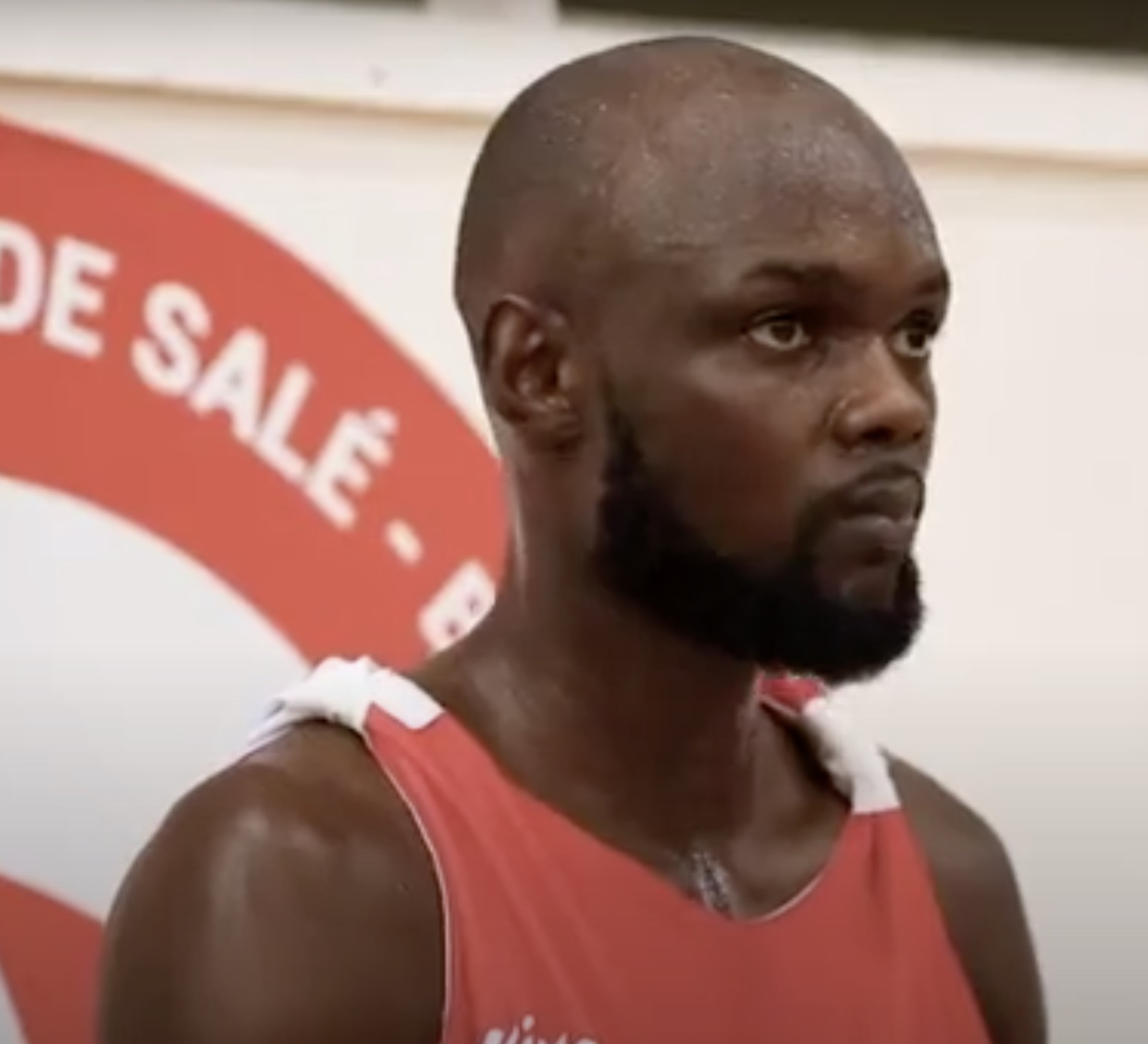
- Harouna in 2022

ASC Ville de Dakar
- Position: Shooting guard
- League: BAL

Personal information
- Born: 12 February 1992 (age 34) Niamey, Niger
- Listed height: 1.96 m (6 ft 5 in)
- Listed weight: 81 kg (179 lb)

Career information
- High school: South Kent School (South Kent, Connecticut)
- College: Miami (2015–2019)
- NBA draft: 2019: undrafted
- Playing career: 2019–present

Career history
- 2019–2020: AS Nigelec
- 2021: FAP
- 2021–2023: AS Salé
- 2023: ABC Fighters
- 2024: AS Douanes
- 2024: Nairobi City Thunder
- 2025–present: ASC Ville de Dakar

Career highlights
- All-BAL Second Team (2024); All-BAL Defensive First Team (2024); BAL steals leader (2024); Moroccan League champion (2022)

Abdoulaye Harouna Amadou (born 12 December 1992) is a Nigerien basketball player who plays for ASC Ville de Dakar of the Basketball Africa League (BAL). He has also played for the Niger national team. Harouna played college basketball for Miami RedHawks between 2015 and 2019.

== Early life ==
Born and raised in Niamey, Niger, Harouna was named MVP of the all-star game in Niger two times. He also participated at the Adidas Nations training camp in four years.

Harouna later moved to the United States to play high school basketball for the private boarding school South Kent School.

== College career ==
Harouna played for the College of Southern Idaho and earned all-region honours; he was named MVP of the Region 18 tournament and helped the Golden Eagles to a 31–3 record and number 3 seed in the NCJAA tournament.

Harouna joined the Miami Redhawks team in 2015, where he wore number 30. He started in 18 games in his rookie season. Harouna redshirted the 2015–16 season.

== Professional career ==
Harouna started his career with AS Nigelec in his home country Niger. In October 2019, Harouna played in the 2020 BAL Qualifying Tournaments with the team.

In May 2021, he joined Cameroonian club FAP Basketball to play in the inaugural BAL season. Harouna led FAP in scoring with 19.3 points per game and guided his team to the quarterfinals.

Since November 2021, Harouna plays in Morocco with AS Salé of the Division Excellence. He helped them win the Division Excellence title in 2022.

After starting the season in Morocco with Salé, in February 2023, Harouna joined the ABC Fighters for Season 3 of the BAL.

In December 2023, Harouna announced on Instagram that he had signed with Senegalese club AS Douanes, runners-up of the previous BAL season, for the 2024 season. On 5 May 2024, Harouna scored a BAL career-high 35 points in a 76–59 win over Monastir. Douanes was eliminated in the quarterfinals by Petro de Luanda, however, Harouna led the league in steals with 4 per game and was named to the All-BAL Defensive First Team for the first time. Harouna was also named to the All-BAL Second Team.

On 24 September 2024, Harouna signed with Cameroonian team KSA for the upcoming Road to BAL games. However, eventually, he did not play for the team. In October 2024, he was announced to join the Nairobi City Thunder from Kenya for the 2024–25 season. Harouna helpe the Thunder qualify for their first-ever BAL season.

In March 2025, he was announced by Senegalese champions ASC Ville de Dakar for the 2025 BAL season.

== BAL career statistics ==
Legend
GP	Games played	GS	Games started	MPG	Minutes per game
FG%	Field goal percentage	3P%	3-point field goal percentage	FT%	Free throw percentage
RPG	Rebounds per game	APG	Assists per game	SPG	Steals per game
BPG	Blocks per game	PPG	Points per game	**Bold**	Career high
*	Led the league

Year	Team	GP	GS	MPG	FG%	3P%	FT%	RPG	APG	SPG	BPG	PPG
2021	FAP	4	4	28.8	.310	.353	.750	4.0	2.3	1.5	0.0	19.3
2022	Salé	6	6	**37.4**	**.446**	**.418**	.636	3.7	**3.5**	2.2	**0.3**	**19.8**
2023	ABC Fighters	6	6	33.8	.327	.254	**.793**	**5.0**	1.8	1.8	0.2	17.3
2024	AS Douanes	**8**	**8**	33.7	.289	.292	.767	2.8	3.4	**4.0***	0.1	17.1

== Personal ==
Harouna speaks English, French, Hausa and Zarma.
