= William Robeyns =

Belgian-Rwandan basketball player (born 1996)

No. 6 – APR
- Position: Small forward
- League: BAL

Personal information
- Born: 23 February 1996 (age 30) Verviers, Belgium
- Listed height: 1.91 m (6 ft 3 in)
- Listed weight: 70 kg (154 lb)

Career information
- Playing career: 2014–present

Career history
- 2014–2016: Liège Basket
- 2016–2018: Spirou Charleroi
- 2018–2021: Phoenix Brussels
- 2021–2022: Liège Basket
- 2022–present: APR
Medals
Men's basketball
Representing Rwanda
FIBA AfroCan
Bronze medal – third place	Angola 2023

William Robeyns (born 23 February 1996) is a Belgian-Rwandan basketball player who last played for Liège Basket of the BNXT League. He also represents the Rwanda national basketball team.

== Professional career ==
Robeyns played for Phoenix Brussels from 2018 to 2021. During the 2020–21 season, he averaged 9.0 points, 1.7 rebounds, and 1.6 assists per game. On 20 May 2021, Robeyns signed with Liège Basket.

In the 2022 Belgian offseason, Robeyns played for APR of the Rwanda Basketball League. On 4 May 2024 Robeyns made his debut in the Basketball Africa League (BAL) with APR, recording 6 points and 5 rebounds in an overtime win against US Monastir.

== Personal life ==
Williams was born in Verviers, Liège province to a Rwandan mother and a Belgian father.

== National team career ==
In August 2021, Robeyn was added to the roster of the Rwanda national basketball team. On 25 August 2021, Robeyn made his debut at the first day of the tournament and contributed 24 points to an 81–68 win over DR Congo.

He won a bronze medal with Rwanda at the 2023 FIBA AfroCan in Angola, which was the country's first podium finish in an international tournament.
