= Dario Hunt =

American basketball player (born 1989)

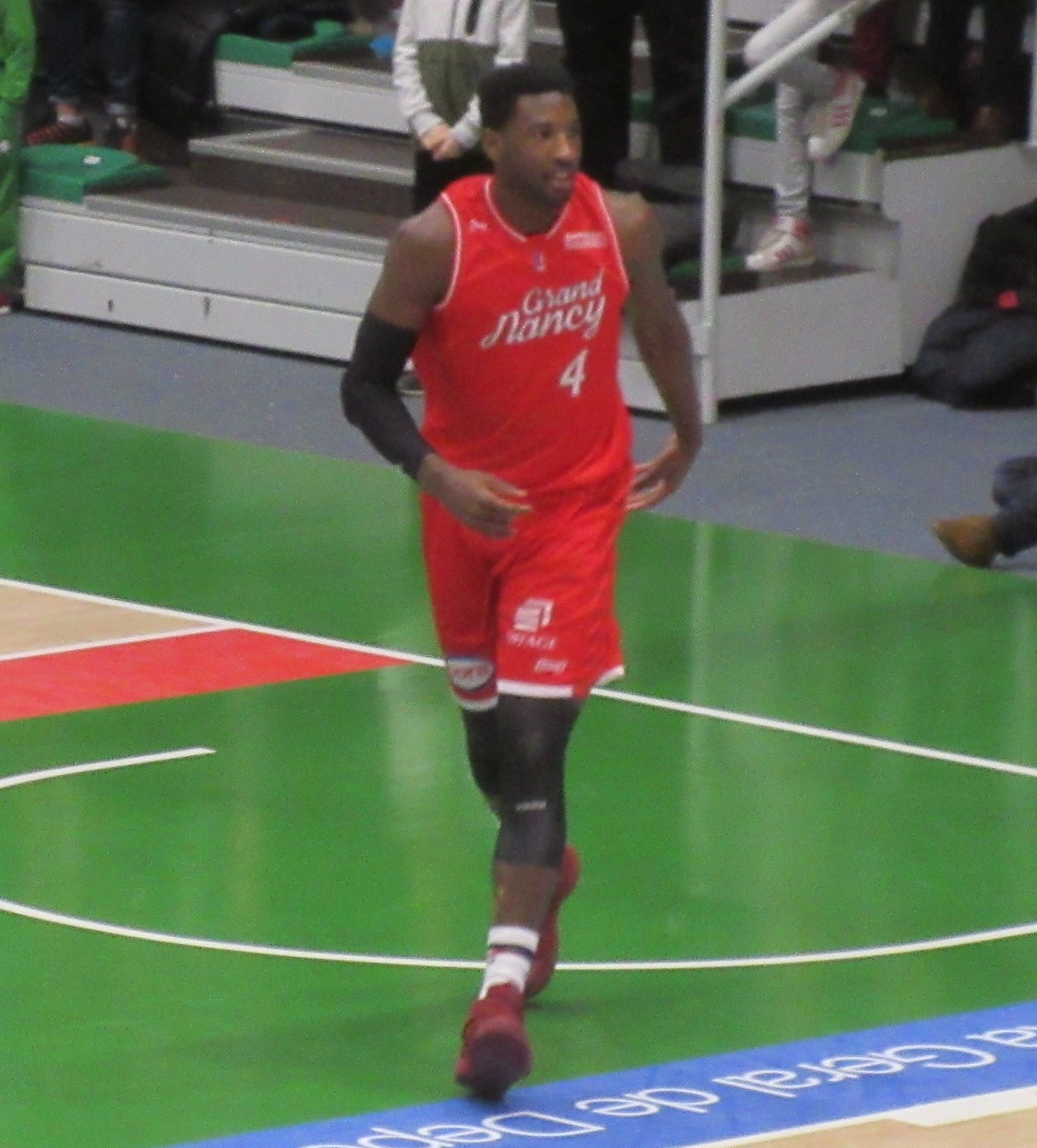
- Hunt with Nancy in 2017

Free agent
- Position: Center

Personal information
- Born: May 2, 1989 (age 37) Tampa, Florida, U.S.
- Listed height: 206 cm (6 ft 9 in)
- Listed weight: 104 kg (229 lb)

Career information
- High school: Pine Creek (Colorado Springs, Colorado); Charis Prep (Wilson, North Carolina)
- College: Nevada (2008–2012)
- NBA draft: 2012: undrafted
- Playing career: 2012–present

Career history
- 2012: Odesa
- 2013: Güssing Knights
- 2013–2014: Rio Grande Valley Vipers
- 2014–2015: Upea Capo d'Orlando
- 2015–2016: Juvecaserta
- 2016–2017: SLUC Nancy
- 2017–2018: Germani Brescia Leonessa
- 2018–2019: Spirou
- 2019–2020: Perth Wildcats
- 2020: Mornar Bar
- 2020: Virtus Roma
- 2020–2021: Fortitudo Bologna
- 2021–2022: Promitheas Patras
- 2022–2023: Pallacanestro Cantù
- 2024: APR
- 2025: San Martín Corrientes

Career highlights
- Belgian League All-Star (2019); Belgian League All-Star Game MVP (2019); French League All-Star (2017); Italian League All-Star (2016); Italian League rebounding leader (2016); 2× Second-team All-WAC (2011, 2012); 3× WAC All-Defensive Team (2010–2012)

Dario Nathan Henry Hunt (born May 2, 1989) is an American professional basketball player. He played four years of college basketball for Nevada, where he was a three-time WAC All-Defensive Team member and a two-time second-team All-WAC honoree. Hunt's professional career has been spent mostly in Europe, with stints in Ukraine, Austria, Italy, France, and Belgium. He has also played in the NBA Development League and had a stint in Australia.

== Early life ==
Hunt, the son of two Air Force veterans, was born in Tampa, Florida. Growing up, he lived in Japan and Turkey, as well as in six or seven different states. He attended four or five different elementary schools and two middle schools.

== High school career ==
Hunt spent his first three years of secondary school at Pine Creek High School in Colorado Springs, Colorado. With the basketball team, he earned second-team all-state honors his junior year after leading the team in scoring, rebounding and blocked shots. He averaged 15 points and 12 rebounds per game as a junior. He set school records for career rebounding and blocks, as well as single-season records for scoring, rebounding and blocks. For his senior year, Hunt moved to North Carolina to attend Charis Prep School. During the 2007–08 season, he averaged 16.1 points, 15.3 rebounds and 3.1 blocks per game, and helped Charis Prep to a 43–3 record. He was subsequently named team MVP and earned first-team all-league honors.

== College career ==
Hunt played college basketball for the Nevada Wolf Pack in the Western Athletic Conference (WAC) from 2008 to 2012. As a freshman in 2008–09, Hunt played in 34 games with 27 starts. He averaged 3.6 points, 4.4 rebounds and 2.0 blocks in 18.8 minutes per game, with his 67 blocks setting the school single-season mark for a freshman while also ranking third on the Wolf Pack's single-season charts.

As a sophomore in 2009–10, Hunt played in all 34 games with 33 starts. He averaged 6.5 points, 7.0 rebounds and 1.9 blocks per game, with his 66 blocks ranking fourth on the Nevada single-season charts. He was subsequently named to his first WAC All-Defensive Team.

As a junior in 2010–11, Hunt averaged 12.4 points and a WAC-leading 9.7 rebounds per game while starting all 32 games. He also led the WAC in blocked shots with 1.84 per game and offensive rebounds at 3.63 per game. His 59 blocks on the season marked the fifth best season total in school history. His six blocks in the final game of the season against New Mexico State on March 10 in the WAC tournament tied his single game career high and tied Nick Fazekas (2004–07) for the top mark in school history with 192. He was named to the WAC All-Defensive Team for the second year in a row and was selected to All-WAC second team as well as the NABC District 6 second team.

As a senior in 2011–12, Hunt averaged 10.3 points, 9.8 rebounds and 2.4 blocks per game, and finished his four-career college career as the only player in WAC history with 1,000 points, 1,000 rebounds and 250 blocks. For the third straight year, he was named to the WAC All-Defensive Team, and the second straight year, he earned second-team All-WAC honors.

== Professional career ==
After going undrafted in the 2012 NBA draft, Hunt signed his first professional contract in July 2012 with Ukrainian team BC Odesa. He played 21 games for Odesa between September 28 and December 23, averaging 6.1 points and 4.5 rebounds. In February 2013, he joined Austrian team UBC Güssing Knights. In 13 games for Güssing, he averaged 14.3 points and 7.3 rebounds per game.

In November 2013, Hunt was acquired by the Rio Grande Valley Vipers of the NBA Development League. An ankle injury suffered in March 2014 led to Hunt missing seven games. In 47 games for the Vipers in 2013–14, he averaged 8.6 points, 7.2 rebounds and 1.1 blocks per game.

In August 2014, Hunt signed a one-year deal with Italian team Upea Capo d'Orlando. In 30 games during the 2014–15 season, he averaged 10.1 points, 8.5 rebounds and 1.1 blocks per game.

On July 31, 2015, Hunt signed with Juvecaserta Basket, returning to Italy for a second stint. In 2015–16, he played in the Serie A All-Star Game and was the league's rebounding leader. In 29 games, he averaged 11.7 points, 9.9 rebounds, 1.1 steals and 1.4 blocks per game.

On June 13, 2016, Hunt signed with French team SLUC Nancy. During the 2016–17 season, he competed in the French League All-Star Game. In 30 games, he averaged 9.4 points, 7.2 rebounds and 1.4 assists per game.

On July 28, 2017, Hunt signed with Germani Basket Brescia, returning to Italy for a third stint. In 32 games, he averaged 11.0 points and 6.5 rebounds per game.

On July 31, 2018, Hunt signed with Belgian team Spirou Basket. In 2018–19, he competed in the Belgian League All-Star Game and earned game MVP honors. In 34 league games, he averaged 12.1 points, 6.0 rebounds and 1.7 assists per game. He also averaged 11.2 points, 7.2 rebounds, 1.3 assists and 1.2 blocks in six FIBA Europe Cup games.

On August 2, 2019, Hunt signed with the Perth Wildcats in Australia for the 2019–20 NBL season. He was released by the Wildcats on January 8, 2020. In 21 games, he averaged 8.6 points, 6.0 rebounds and 1.6 assists per game.

On January 26, 2020, Hunt signed with Mornar Bar of the Montenegrin League for the rest of the season. He played one game before the season was cancelled.

On August 22, 2020, Hunt signed with Virtus Roma of the Lega Basket Serie A. However, after Virtus Roma's withdrawal from the Serie A due to financial problems, he left the team and signed with Fortitudo Bologna on December 14, 2020.

On August 10, 2021, Hunt signed with Greek club Promitheas Patras. In 25 league games, he averaged 8.1 points, 3.8 rebounds, 1.2 assists and 0.8 blocks, playing around 17 minutes per contest.

In July 2022, Hunt signed with Pallacanestro Cantù of the Serie A2.

Hunt joined Hapoel Haifa of the Israeli Basketball Premier League for the 2023–24 season, but he did not debut for the team.

In January 2024, Hunt signed with Rwandan club APR for the 2024 seasons of the Rwanda Basketball League and the Basketball Africa League.

In January 2025, Hunt joined San Martín Corrientes of the Liga Nacional de Básquetbol. In 30 games to finish the 2024–25 season, he averaged 7.0 points and 6.5 rebounds per game.
