= Jo Lual-Acuil =

South Sudanese Australian basketball player

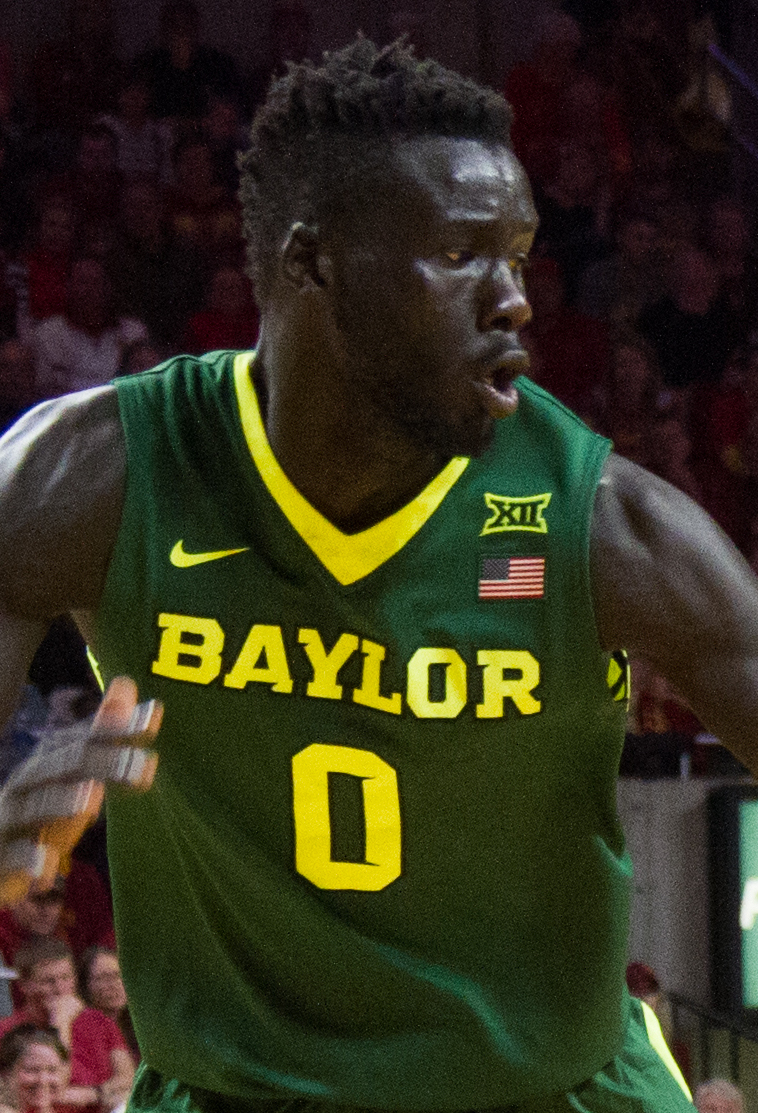
- Lual-Acuil with the Baylor Bears in 2017

No. 0 – Perth Wildcats
- Position: Center
- League: NBL

Personal information
- Born: 26 April 1994 (age 32) Wau, Sudan (now South Sudan)
- Listed height: 211 cm (6 ft 11 in)
- Listed weight: 103 kg (227 lb)

Career information
- High school: Kingsway Christian College (Perth, Western Australia)
- College: Neosho County CC (2013–2015); Baylor (2016–2018)
- NBA draft: 2018: undrafted
- Playing career: 2018–present

Career history
- 2018–2019: Hapoel Jerusalem
- 2019: →Hapoel Galil Elyon
- 2019–2022: Melbourne United
- 2022–2023: Nanjing Monkey Kings
- 2023: Dynamo Lebanon
- 2023–2024: Melbourne United
- 2024: Al Ahly Ly
- 2024: Sandringham Sabres
- 2024: Liaoning Flying Leopards
- 2024–2025: Manisa Basket
- 2025: Al Ittihad Alexandria
- 2025–present: Perth Wildcats
- 2026: Al Ahly Ly

Career highlights
- BAL Most Valuable Player (2024); BAL Defensive Player of the Year (2024); All-BAL First Team (2024); BAL All-Defensive Team (2024); NBL champion (2021); All-NBL First Team (2022); All-NBL Second Team (2024); NBL Best Sixth Man (2021); Third-team All-Big 12 (2018); Big 12 All-Defensive Team (2017); Big 12 All-Newcomer Team (2017)

Joseph Lual-Acuil Jr. (born 26 April 1994) is a South Sudanese-Australian professional basketball player for the Perth Wildcats of the National Basketball League (NBL). He played college basketball for Neosho County Community College and Baylor University. In 2021, he won an NBL championship with Melbourne United. In 2024, he won MVP of the Basketball Africa League (BAL) with Al Ahly Ly.

== Early life ==
Lual-Acuil was born in Wau, South Sudan. Due to the civil war, he was relocated to a refugee camp in Uganda at the age of three where he lived for three years until his family moved to Australia. Lual-Acuil attended Kingsway Christian College in Perth, Western Australia. He was a soccer player growing up, but picked up the game of basketball after his soccer coach suggested he play for the team one year.

In 2012, Lual-Acuil attended the Australian Institute of Sport (AIS) in Canberra.

== College career ==
=== Neosho County CC (2013–2015) ===
Lual-Acuil played two seasons for Neosho County Community College. In his sophomore year at Neosho County, he averaged 20.1 points, 11.2 rebounds and 4.7 blocks while playing all 30 games. He was named 2015 Jayhawk Conference Defensive Player of the Year and earned a spot in the All-Conference First Team and All-Region First Team.

=== Baylor (2016–2018) ===
Lual-Acuil joined Baylor University in the summer of 2015, but sat out his first season for a heart condition. In his year off, Lual-Acuil focused on improving his fitness and strength.

In his junior year, Lual-Acuil was named Big 12 Newcomer of the Week for games played from 12 December through 18 December. In 35 games played during the 2016–17 season, Lual-Acuil averaged 9.1 points, 6.7 rebounds and 2.5 blocks per game and helped the Bears to a 3 seed in the NCAA Tournament. On 5 March 2017, Lual-Acuil earned a spot in the 2017 Big 12 All-Defensive Team and All-Newcomer Team.

On 17 December 2017, Lual-Acuil recorded a double-double and college career-highs of 31 points and 20 rebounds, shooting 10-of-15 from the field, along with three blocks and two assists in a 118–86 blowout win over Savannah State. Lual-Acuil finished his senior year averaging 14 points, 8.6 rebounds and 1.9 blocks per game. On 8 March 2018, Lual-Acuil earned a spot in the 2018 All-Big 12 Third Team. He graduated with a degree in Health Studies and Kinesiology.

== Professional career ==
=== Hapoel Jerusalem (2018–2019) ===
On 13 August 2018, Lual-Acuil started his professional career with Hapoel Jerusalem of the Israeli Premier League, signing a three-year deal. On 6 February 2019, Lual-Acuil agreed terms to join the Hungarian team Atomerőmű SE, but eventually the deal fell through.

=== Hapoel Galil Elyon (2019) ===
On 10 February 2019, Lual-Acuil was loaned to Hapoel Galil Elyon of the Israeli National League for the rest of the season. On 5 March 2019, Lual-Acuil recorded a season-high 27 points in his fourth game with Galil Elyon, shooting 11-of-17 from the field, along with eleven rebounds and three blocks in an 86–65 win over Hapoel Kfar Saba. In 19 games played for Galil Elyon, he led the league in blocks with 2.3 per game, while averaging 16.6 points and 10.5 rebounds per game. Lual-Acuil helped Galil Elyon reach the league finals, where they eventually were defeated by Maccabi Haifa.

=== Melbourne United (2019–2022) ===
On 20 August 2019, Lual-Acuil signed with Melbourne United in Australia for the 2019–20 NBL season. He returned to United for the 2020–21 NBL season and was named NBL Best Sixth Man while helping the team win the championship. He averaged 9.7 points, 4.7 rebounds, and 1.4 blocks per game.

On 30 June 2021, Lual-Acuil re-signed with United for the 2021–22 NBL season.

=== China / Lebanon (2022–2023) ===
After playing for the Phoenix Suns in the 2022 NBA Summer League, Lual-Acuil joined the Nanjing Monkey Kings of the Chinese Basketball Association (CBA) for the 2022–23 season. Following the CBA season, he joined Dynamo Lebanon of the Lebanese Basketball League.

=== Return to Melbourne (2023–2024) ===
On 12 April 2023, Lual-Acuil signed a two-year deal with Melbourne United, returning to the franchise for a second stint. On 7 July 2023, he was ruled out for four to five months with a right wrist injury. On 26 January 2024, he had a career-high 33 points and 13 rebounds in 23 minutes off the bench in a 93–77 win over the Brisbane Bullets.

At the conclusion of the 2023–24 NBL season, Lual-Acuil parted ways with United.

=== Al-Ahly Ly (2024) ===
In April 2024, Lual-Acuil joined Al Ahly Ly of the Basketball Africa League (BAL) for the 2024 season. On 27 April 2024, he had 42 points and 13 rebounds in a 110–78 win over City Oilers, setting a new record for most points in a single game. He helped Al Ahly Ly reach the final, where they lost to Petro de Luanda. He was named the league's Most Valuable Player as well as the Defensive Player of the Year, becoming the first player to win both awards in one season. Lual-Acuil led the league in scoring with 21.1 points per game, and also averaged 9.9 rebounds and 1.6 blocks per game.

=== Sandringham Sabres (2024) ===
In June 2024, Lual-Acuil played one game for the Sandringham Sabres of the NBL1 South during the 2024 NBL1 season. He then played for the Sacramento Kings during the 2024 NBA Summer League.

=== Liaoning Flying Leopards (2024) ===
On September 14, 2024, Lual-Acuil joined the Liaoning Flying Leopards of the Chinese Basketball Association. On November 14, his contract was terminated.

=== Manisa Basket (2024–2025) ===
On December 8, 2024, Lual-Acuil signed with Manisa Basket of the Turkish Basketbol Süper Ligi (BSL).

=== Al Ittihad (2025) ===
In May 2025, Lual-Acuil signed with Al Ittihad Alexandria from Egypt to play in the 2025 BAL season's playoffs, returning for a second straight year in the BAL.

=== Perth Wildcats and Al Ahly Ly (2025–present) ===
On 22 July 2025, Lual-Acuil signed a two-year deal with the Perth Wildcats, returning to the NBL for a third stint. In 2025–26, he averaged 17.0 points, 6.8 rebounds and 1.5 blocks per game.

In March 2026, Lual-Acuil joined Al Ahly Ly of the Libyan Basketball League and Basketball Africa League, returning to the team for a second stint.

On 1 October 2026, just three games into the 2026–27 NBL season, Lual-Acuil was sidelined by a calf injury. On 21 October, he was ruled out until late November following a setback with his injury.

== National team ==
In 2022, Lual-Acuil was selected to play for the South Sudanese national team in the FIBA World Cup Qualifiers.

== Personal life ==
Lual-Acuil's father, Joseph, was South Sudan's first Minister of Humanitarian Affairs and Disaster Management. He is married and has two children.
