= Sadio Doucouré =

French-Malian basketball player (born 1992)

Njarðvík
- Position: Small Forward
- League: Úrvalsdeild karla

Personal information
- Born: 27 July 1992 (age 34) Corbeil-Essonne, France
- Listed height: 6 ft 8 in (2.03 m)
- Listed weight: 212 lb (96 kg)

Career information
- Playing career: 2012–present

Career history
- 2012–2013: Cognac
- 2013–2014: BC Orchies
- 2014–2016: Chorale Roanne
- 2016–2017: JA Vichy-Clermont
- 2017–2019: Châlons-Reims
- 2019–2020: Levallois Metropolitans
- 2020–2021: Antibes Sharks
- 2021–2022: Fos Provence Basket
- 2022–2023: Nanterre 92
- 2023–2024: Peja
- 2024: US Monastir
- 2024–2025: Tindastóll
- 2025: Dorados de Chihuahua
- 2026–present: Njarðvík

Sadio Doucouré (born July 27, 1992) is a French and Malian professional basketball player for Tindastóll. He has also played for the Mali national team.

== Professional career ==
After playing his rookie season with Cognac, Doucouré played for several other teams in France. In the 2023–24 season, he played for KB Peja of the Kosovo Basketball Superleague.

On April 25, 2024, Doucouré was announced as a new signing of Tunisian champions US Monastirof the Basketball Africa League (BAL). He made his debut on May 4, 2024, with 12 points in an overtime loss against APR.

In July 2024, he signed with Tindastóll of the Icelandic Úrvalsdeild karla.

In August 2026, he signed with Njarðvík.
