= Will Perry =

American basketball player (born 1994)

Free agent
- Position: Point guard

Personal information
- Born: October 11, 1993 (age 32) Raleigh, North Carolina, U.S.
- Listed height: 6 ft 0 in (1.83 m)
- Listed weight: 180 lb (82 kg)

Career information
- High school: Wake Forest (Wake Forest, North Carolina)
- College: Lenoir–Rhyne (2012–2016)
- NBA draft: 2016: undrafted
- Playing career: 2016–present

Career history
- 2016–2017: Zamora
- 2017–2018: Ovarense
- 2018–2020: Academic Plovdiv
- 2020–2021: Estela
- 2021–2023: Ferroviário da Beira
- 2023: Kigali Titans
- 2024: Patriots
- 2024: Rivers Hoopers
- 2025: ASC Ville de Dakar
- 2025: Urunani

Career highlights
- All-BAL First Team (2024); 2× BAL Sportsmanship Award (2023, 2024); 2× LMB champion (2021, 2022); 2× LMB Most Valuable Player (2021, 2022); All-SAC Second Team (2016)

William Kiah Perry (born October 11, 1994) is an American professional basketball player. Standing at 1.83 m (6 ft 0 in), Perry plays as point guard. Alumnus of Lenoir–Rhyne University, he has played several years of professional basketball in Europe and Africa. Perry previously held the record for most points in a single BAL game, is a one-time All-BAL First Team selection and a two-time BAL Sportsmanship Award winner.

== College career ==
Born in Raleigh, North Carolina, Perry played four seasons for the Lenoir–Rhyne Bears in the NCAA Division II. In the 2015–16 season, Perry set a school record for most three-pointers made in a season with 101, helping the Bears to a 21–10 record and their first-ever birth in the Southeast Regional Championship. He was an All-SAC Second Team selection in 2016, and was an Honorable Mention in 2015.

Perry ended his Bears career with 1,267 career points and with the highest free throw percentage in history at .899.

== Professional career ==
=== Europe (2016–2020) ===
Going undrafted in the 2016 NBA draft, Perry began his professional career with CB Zamora of the Spanish LEB Plata. He averaged 8.3 points and 2.2 rebounds per game as Zamora missed the playoffs with a 11–19 record. He then played two seasons in Portugal for Ovarense of the Liga Portuguesa de Basquetebol (LPB).

Perry joined Academic Plovdiv of the Bulgarian NBL in 2018, and stayed two seasons. Then, he went on to play for Amicale Steesel in Luxembourg and for CD Estela of the LEB Plata.

=== Africa and the BAL (2021–present) ===
==== First stint with Beira (2021–2022) ====
In 2021, Perry joined the Mozambican team Ferroviário da Beira of the Liga Moçambicana de Basquetebol (LMB). He helped Beira win the 2021 LMB championship while being named MVP. He then led them to qualify for the 2022 BAL season, where he averaged 14 points, 4 rebounds and 5 assists per game. He later re-joined Beira, and Perry repeated as MVP in the 2022 LMB season when he guided Beira to a second straight championship.

==== Kigali Titans (2023) ====
On January 8, 2023, Perry joined the Kigali Titans of the Rwanda Basketball League (RBL) on a one month-contract.

==== Second stint with Beira (2023) ====
After another successful qualifiers campaign, Beira played in the 2023 BAL season. On April 30, 2023, Perry scored 41 points in a 109–97 win over SLAC, thus tying the record for most points in a BAL game, previously only hold by Terrell Stoglin. Perry also set a then record for most three pointers in a game with 9 triples, a record that was broken in 2025 by Axel Mpoyo. His record was broken the next season by Jo Lual-Acuil. On May 28, 2023, Perry received the BAL Sportsmanship Award, awarded "for exemplifying ideals of sportsmanship on the court with ethical behavior, fair play, and integrity".

===== Patriots BBC (2024) =====
In February 2024, Perry joined Patriots in Rwanda. He made his debut on February 11, scoring 26 points in a 84–67 victory over Tigers BBC.

==== Rivers Hoopers (2024) ====
On February 24, 2024, the Nigerian Rivers Hoopers announced they had signed Perry for the 2024 BAL season. Perry was a key player in the Hoopers' record season, in which they captured the third place for the first time in history. Perry led the team in scoring with 17.2 points per game, and also averaged 5.4 assists per game. He was named a All-BAL First Team selection following the season, and also won another BAL Sportsmanship Award, his second in a row.

==== ASC Ville de Dakar (2025) ====
In March 2025, Perry joined Senegalese club ASC Ville de Dakar for the 2025 BAL season. He averaged 14 points, 4 rebounds and 4.2 assists with Dakar, but the team did not advance to the playoffs.

==== Urunani (2025) ====
On May 21, 2025, Perry joined Burundian champions Urunani of the Viva Basketball League. He was forced to leave the team after a shoulder injury right before the playoffs, and was replaced by Parish Petty.

== BAL career statistics ==
Legend
GP	Games played	GS	Games started	MPG	Minutes per game
FG%	Field goal percentage	3P%	3-point field goal percentage	FT%	Free throw percentage
RPG	Rebounds per game	APG	Assists per game	SPG	Steals per game
BPG	Blocks per game	PPG	Points per game	**Bold**	Career high
*	Led the league

Year	Team	GP	GS	MPG	FG%	3P%	FT%	RPG	APG	SPG	BPG	PPG
2022	Ferroviário da Beira	5	5	32.9	.439	**.394**	.800	3.4	4.4	0.6	**0.2**	14.2
2023	Ferroviário da Beira	6	6	**35.9**	.373	.362	**.967***	**5.3**	**6.8**	**1.5**	0.0	17.0
2024	Rivers Hoopers	**9**	**9**	35.2	**.443**	.375	.919	4.2	5.4	1.3	0.1	**17.2**
