= Firas Lahyani =

Tunisian basketball player

No. 23 – US Monastir
- Position: Power forward
- League: Championnat Pro A

Personal information
- Born: July 16, 1991 (age 35) Sfax, Tunisia
- Listed height: 6 ft 8 in (2.03 m)

Career information
- Playing career: 2006–present

Career history
- 2006–2013: Sfax RS
- 2013–2022: US Monastir
- 2022–2023: Smouha
- 2023: US Monastir
- 2023: AS Salé
- 2023-present: US Monastir

Career highlights
- BAL champion (2022); 6× Tunisian League champion (2019–2022); 4× Tunisian Cup winner (2020–2022); Tunisian Cup Final MVP (2017); Tunisian League Best Talent (2014)
Medals
Men's basketball
Representing Tunisia
AfroBasket
Gold medal – first place	2017 Tunisia/Senegal

Firas Lahyani (born 16 July 1991) is a Tunisian basketball player for US Monastir and the Tunisian national team. He is nicknamed "Air Tunisia", because of his athletic style of play and dunking abilities.

== Professional career ==
Lahyani started his career with Sfax RS.

In 2003, Lahyani signed with US Monastir. He won four consecutive national league titles with Monastir from 2019 to 2022. On 28 May, he scored a team-high 21 points on 6-9 shooting in the 2022 BAL Finals to help Monastir win its first-ever BAL championship.

In August 2022, he joined Smouha of the Egyptian Basketball Super League, ending his 9-year tenure at Monastir. He returned to Monastir ahead of the 2023 FIBA Intercontinental Cup, in February 2023.

In October 2023, Lahyani joined the Moroccan club AS Salé in the 2023 Arab Club Basketball Championship.

After the Arab Club Basketball Championship, Firas Lahyani went back to US Monastir and ends up winning the Championship title of the Tunisian League 2023–2024 season.

== National team career ==
Lahyani participated with the Tunisia national team at the AfroBasket 2017.

== BAL career statistics ==
Legend
GP	Games played	GS	Games started	MPG	Minutes per game
FG%	Field goal percentage	3P%	3-point field goal percentage	FT%	Free throw percentage
RPG	Rebounds per game	APG	Assists per game	SPG	Steals per game
BPG	Blocks per game	PPG	Points per game	**Bold**	Career high
†	Won an BAL championship

Year	Team	GP	GS	MPG	FG%	3P%	FT%	RPG	APG	SPG	BPG	PPG
2021	Monastir	5	0	12.2	.579	.000	.750	3.2	1.0	0.6	0.2	5.0
2022†	Monastir	8	8	24.7	.614	.308	.667	6.3	2.3	0.5	0.5	12.5
2023	Monastir	5	5	2.8	.548	.143	.667	4.8	1.4	.8	.2	9.8
