= Dakar Arena =

Indoor arena in Senegal

- Interactive map of Dakar Arena
- Location: Dakar, Senegal
- Coordinates: 14°44′2.148″N 17°12′44.489″W
- Capacity: 15,000
- Surface: Parquet floor

Construction
- Groundbreaking: 9 May 2016
- Opened: 8 August 2018
- Architect: Summa International Construction

Tenants
- Senegal national basketball team Senegal women's national basketball team

The Dakar Arena (nicknamed Palais des sports de Diamniadio) is an indoor sports arena located in Diamniadio, Senegal. Built between 2016 and 2018, it is primarily used for basketball games, and it is the home arena of the Senegal national basketball team and the Senegal women's national basketball team. The arena has a seating capacity of 15,000 people.

It is one of Africa's newest basketball arenas.

== History ==
President Macky Sall promised to build a new basketball arena, after Senegal won the AfroBasket Women 2015. The objective was to replace the Marius Ndiaye Stadium as the home arena for both men and women basketball teams in Senegal.

The Dakar Arena was broke down on 9 May 2016, by President Macky Sall, Prime Minister Mahammed Boun Abdallah Dionne and many basketball players.

On 8 August 2018, the Dakar Arena was inaugurated by Macky Sall.

It hosted all matches of the 2019 Women's Afrobasket. The final took place in front of a capacity crowd of 15,000.

The Dakar Arena hosted the Sahara Conference of the Basketball Africa League in several BAL seasons. In the 2025 BAL season, the Sahara Conference games were played at the Dakar Arena, with a total attendance of 47,525 and an average attendance of 2,640 per game over 18 games.

== See also ==
- List of indoor arenas by capacity
