= Chris Crawford (basketball, born 1992) =

American professional basketball player

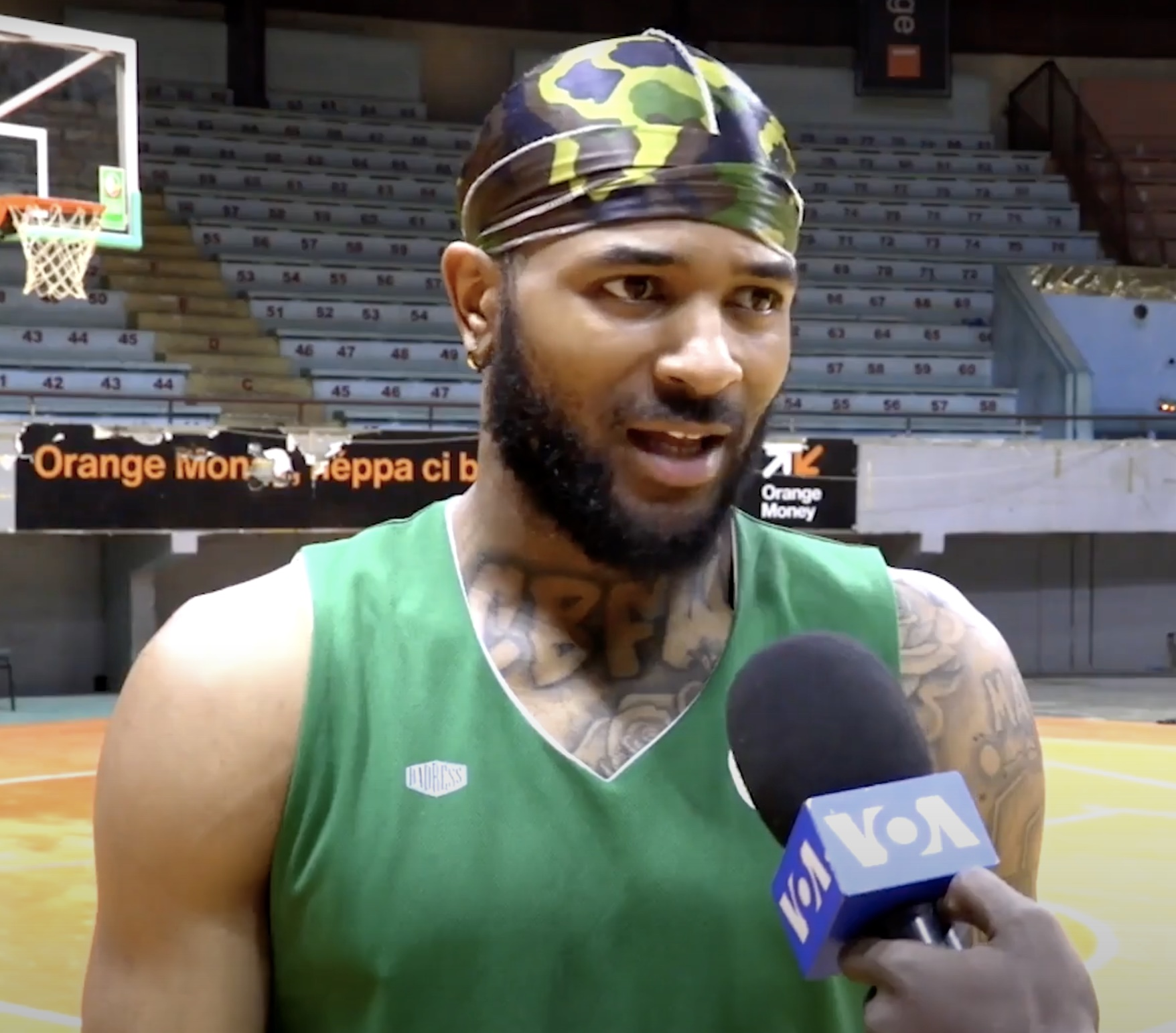
- Crawford in 2023

No. 23 – Paisas
- Position: Shooting guard / small forward
- League: Baloncesto Profesional Colombiano

Personal information
- Born: September 30, 1992 (age 34) Memphis, Tennessee, U.S.
- Listed height: 6 ft 4 in (1.93 m)
- Listed weight: 220 lb (100 kg)

Career information
- High school: Sheffield (Memphis, Tennessee)
- College: Memphis (2010–2014)
- NBA draft: 2014: undrafted
- Playing career: 2014–present

Career history
- 2014–2015: Canton Charge
- 2015–2016: Rouen Métropole Basket
- 2016: Canton Charge
- 2016: Iowa Energy
- 2017–2019: Beirut Club
- 2019: Homenetmen
- 2020–2021: Club Africain
- 2021: Ezzahra Sports
- 2021: US Monastir
- 2022: SLAC
- 2022: Al Wahda Damascus
- 2022: Patriots
- 2023: AS Douanes
- 2023: Beirut Club
- 2023: AS Salé
- 2023: Al Ahly Benghazi
- 2023: Al Ittihad Alexandria
- 2024: US Monastir
- 2024–2025: Urunani
- 2025–present: Paisas

Career highlights
- 2× All-BAL First Team (2023, 2024); BAL assists leader (2024); Conference USA Sixth Man of the Year (2013); Third-team All-Conference USA (2012)
- Stats at Basketball Reference

Marcus Christopher Crawford (born September 30, 1992) is an American professional basketball player for Paisas of the Baloncesto Profesional Colombiano. He played college basketball for the University of Memphis, and has had an extensive career with teams in Europe, Africa, and South America. He is a two-time All-BAL First Team selection.

== College career ==
Crawford played four years of college basketball for the Memphis Tigers. After two irregular initial seasons, he had a breakout season as a junior in 2012–13, posting career highs in points, rebounds, three-point field goals made (71), and three-point percentage (39.9), and earning Conference USA Sixth Man of the Year honors.

== Professional career ==
=== 2014–15 season: Rookie season in the NBA D-League ===
After going undrafted in the 2014 NBA draft, Crawford joined the Houston Rockets for the 2014 NBA Summer League. On September 28, 2014, he signed with the Cleveland Cavaliers. However, he was later waived by the Cavaliers on October 19 after appearing in five preseason games. On November 2, he was acquired by the Canton Charge of the NBA Development League as an affiliate player of the Cavaliers. In his rookie season, Crawford helped the Charge record a franchise-best 31 wins. He went on to help his team win their first round playoff match-up against the Sioux Falls Skyforce 2–1, making it through to the semi-finals where they lost to the Fort Wayne Mad Ants 2–0. In 54 games for the Charge in 2014–15, Crawford averaged 8.8 points, 3.9 rebounds, 3.4 assists and 1.0 steals per game.

=== 2015–16 season: France and D-League ===
On July 28, 2015, Crawford signed with SPO Rouen Basket of France for the 2015–16 LNB Pro A season. On January 4, 2016, he was released by Rouen. In 14 games for the club, he averaged 5.5 points, 2.1 rebounds and 1.9 assists per game.

On February 24, 2016, Crawford was reacquired by the Canton Charge. He made his season debut that night in a 119–109 win over the Grand Rapids Drive, recording 11 points, two rebounds and nine assists in 26 minutes.

=== 2016–17 season: NBA D-League ===
On September 23, 2016, Crawford signed with the Memphis Grizzlies. However, he was later waived by the Grizzlies on October 20 after appearing in four preseason games. On November 1, he was reacquired by the Canton Charge. Ten days later, he was waived by the Canton Charge. On November 28, he was acquired by the Iowa Energy, but was waived on December 12 after averaging 7.3 points, 1.0 rebounds and 3.7 assists in three games.

=== 2017–18 and 2018–19 seasons: Beirut Club ===
During summer 2017, Crawford signed a one-year deal with Beirut Club of the Lebanese Basketball League. During that season he led his team to the league's Final Four. He averaged 18.6 points, 7.3 rebounds, and 6.3 assists per game.

On August 29, 2018, Crawford signed another one-year deal with Beirut Club.

=== 2020–21 season: Tunisia ===
In January 2020, Crawford signed in Tunisia with US Monastir of the Basketball Africa League (BAL). However, the season was cancelled shortly after his signing due to the COVID-19 pandemic outbreak. Later, he joined Club Africain in Tunisia instead. On March 21, 2021, he signed with Ezzahra Sports.

=== 2021–22 season: Guinea, Syria and Rwanda ===
In March 2022, Crawford joined the Guinean club SLAC before the 2022 season of the BAL. On March 5, he scored 30 points in a 70–85 opening night win against DUC. He helped SLAC advance to the playoffs after leading the team in both points and assist with 21.4 points and 4.8 assists per game.

On May 17, 2022, Crawford joined Al Wahda Damascus of the Syrian Basketball League.

On August 23, 2022, he joined Patriots BBC of the Rwanda Basketball League ahead of the playoffs. On August 26, Crawford scored 8 points in his debut in a 91–45 win against Tigers BBC. The Patriots ended up losing the league finals to REG, therefore finishing second.

=== 2022–23 season: Senegal and Lebanon ===
In January 2023, Crawford signed with Senegalese champions AS Douanes with whom he played in his third consecutive BAL season. He helped the Douanes surprisingly reach the 2023 BAL Final, where the Douanes lost to Al Ahly from Egypt. He was given a place in the All-BAL First Team after his averages 19.0 points and 5.5 rebounds over the season.

Later that year, in June, Crawford returned to Beirut Club in Lebanon to help the team in the Final Eight of the FIBA West Asia Super League.

=== 2023–24 season: Morocco, Libya, Egypt and Tunisia ===
In September 2023, Crawford joined the Moroccan club AS Salé and made their debut with them in the Arab Club Basketball Championship. Salé finished as runners-up.

In October 2023, Crawford joined Al Ahly Benghazi for the 2024 edition of the Road to BAL, and helped Al Ahly qualify for the BAL as the first team from Libya. On November 5, Crawford scored a game-high 39 points in the decisive third place game against FAP, thus clinching a berth in the BAL.

Shortly after finishing play with Al Ahly, Crawford was announced by Al Ittihad Alexandria of the Egyptian Basketball Premier League.

In May 2024, Crawford returned to US Monastir for a second stint with the Tunisian champions. He led the league in assists with 9.0 per game, and was named to his second straight All-BAL First Team selection, despite Monastir losing in the quarterfinals to the Rivers Hoopers.

=== 2024–25 season: Burundi ===
In October 2024, Crawford joined the Burundian champions Urunani for their qualifying games in the 2025 BAL qualification, where he re-united with his former backcourt teammate at AS Douanes, Jean Jacques Boissy.

=== The Basketball Tournament ===
Chris Crawford played for Team Memphis State in the 2018 edition of The Basketball Tournament. He averaged 10.0 points per game, 5.0 assists per game and 4.5 rebounds per game. Team Memphis State reached the second round before falling to Team DRC.

== BAL career statistics ==
Legend
| GP | Games played | GS | Games started | MPG | Minutes per game |
| FG% | Field goal percentage | 3P% | 3-point field goal percentage | FT% | Free throw percentage |
| RPG | Rebounds per game | APG | Assists per game | SPG | Steals per game |
| BPG | Blocks per game | PPG | Points per game | **Bold** | Career high |

| Year | Team | GP | GS | MPG | FG% | 3P% | FT% | RPG | APG | SPG | BPG | PPG |
|---|---|---|---|---|---|---|---|---|---|---|---|---|
| 2021 | Monastir | 6 | 0 | 24.1 | **.478** | .410 | .500 | 3.0 | 3.7 | 1.3 | .2 | 14.0 |
| 2022 | SLAC | 5 | 5 | **36.0** | .438 | **.412** | **.889** | **6.4** | 4.0 | 1.2 | .2 | **21.4** |
| 2023 | AS Douanes | **8** | **8** | 34.1 | .380 | .319 | .788 | 5.5 | 3.3 | **1.5** | **.5** | 19.0 |
| 2024 | Monastir | **8** | 7 | 35.8 | .460 | .387 | .600 | 5.5 | **9.0** | 1.3 | .4 | 19.0 |
