= Madut Akec =

South Sudanese-Australian basketball player (born 1999)

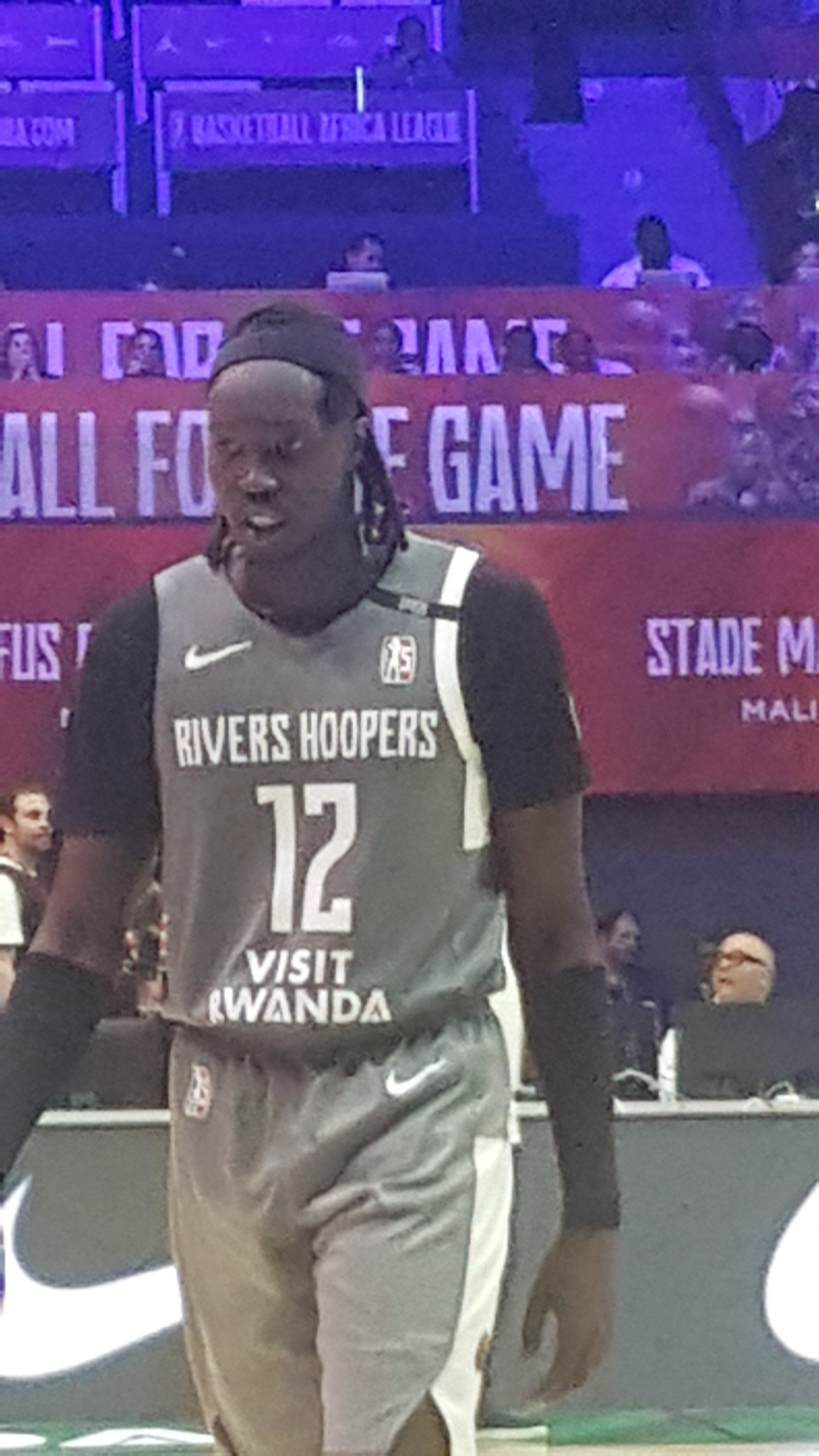
- Akec with Rivers Hoopers in 2025

No. 3 – Waverley Falcons
- Position: Forward
- League: NBL1 South

Personal information
- Born: 1 January 1999 (age 27) Tonj, South Sudan
- Listed height: 6 ft 7 in (2.01 m)
- Listed weight: 205 lb (93 kg)

Career information
- High school: Victory Rock Prep Prep (Bradenton, Florida, U.S.)
- College: South Florida (2019–2021); Detroit Mercy (2021–2022)
- Playing career: 2022–present

Career history
- 2022: Guelph Nighthawks
- 2022–2023: ETHA Engomis
- 2023–2024: Knox Raiders
- 2024: Çair 2030
- 2024: Mayrouba Club
- 2024: AS Douanes
- 2024: Al Safa of Safwa
- 2024: NS Matrix Deers
- 2025: Rivers Hoopers
- 2025–present: Waverley Falcons

Career highlights
- 2× NBL1 National champion (2023, 2024); NBL1 South champion (2023)

Madut John Angok Akec (born 1 January 1999) is a South Sudanese-Australian professional basketball player for the Waverley Falcons of the NBL1 South. He played college basketball for the South Florida Bulls and Detroit Mercy Titans.

== Early life ==
Akec was born in Tonj, South Sudan. He later lived in Uganda for two years before moving to Australia, where he lived for 11 years.

Akec played high school basketball in the United States for Victory Rock Prep Prep in Bradenton, Florida, averaging 19.9 points per game as a senior.

== College career ==
Akec played two seasons of college basketball for the South Florida Bulls between 2019 and 2021. After redshirting the 2018–19 season, he debuted for the Bulls in the 2019–20 season. He played in 18 games as a redshirt freshman, with five starts, and averaged 2.1 points and 2.1 rebounds per game. He saw action in 15 games in 2020–21 and averaged 1.7 points and 2.5 rebounds per game.

Akec left South Florida following the 2020–21 season and transferred to the Detroit Mercy Titans. In 2021–22, he played in 24 games with 22 starts and was second on the team in scoring at 12.7 points per game and led the team with 7.0 rebounds per contest.

== Professional career ==
Akec made his professional debut in 2022 with the Guelph Nighthawks of the Canadian Elite Basketball League.

For the 2022–23 season, Akec joined ETHA Engomis in Cyprus.

Akec joined the Knox Raiders of the NBL1 South for the 2023 season.

In January 2024, Akec joined Çair 2030 in North Macedonia, where he had a two-game stint. In March 2024, he joined Mayrouba Club in Lebanon, where he played four games. He went on to play for Senegalese club AS Douanes in the 2024 BAL season.

In June 2024, Akec re-joined the Knox Raiders for the rest of the 2024 NBL1 South season.

Akec started the 2024–25 season with a one-game stint with Al Safa of Safwa in Saudi Arabia before joining NS Matrix Deers in Malaysia, where he played until early December.

In March 2025, Akec signed with Nigerian club Rivers Hoopers for the 2025 BAL season. In his Hoopers debut on 5 April, he scored 25 points in a win over Stade Malien. Akec made a big leap in his second BAL season, as he averaged 17.9 points, 6.3 rebounds per game and shot 46.7% from the three point line.

In May 2025, Akec joined the Waverley Falcons for the rest of the 2025 NBL1 South season.

== Personal life ==
Akec is the son of Elizabeth and Deng Akec. He has six sisters and five brothers, including Deng Adel, who is a professional basketball player as well.
