= Mike Fofana =

Ivorian-American basketball player (born 1997)

No. 13 – AS Douanes
- Position: Power forward
- League: BAL

Personal information
- Born: October 5, 1997 (age 29)
- Listed height: 2.06 m (6 ft 9 in)

Career information
- High school: Whitehaven (Memphis, Tennessee)
- College: UT Martin (2016–2018); Henderson State (2018–2019)
- NBA draft: 2019: undrafted
- Playing career: 2020–present

Career history
- 2020–2021: Esgueira Basket
- 2021–2022: Sporting CP
- 2023–2024: ABC Fighters
- 2024: Esgueira Basket
- 2024–present: AS Douanes

Seydougou Santis "Mike" Fofana (born 5 October 1997) is an Ivorian-American basketball player for AS Douanes of the Basketball Africa League (BAL). He is a 2.06 m (6 ft 9 in) tall power forward and also plays for the Ivory Coast national team.

== High school and college career ==
Fofana played for Whitehaven High School and won the Tennessee State championship twice. He played two years for the UT Martin Skyhawks men's basketball team in the NCAA Division II. Afterwards, Fofana played one season for the Henderson State Reddies and was an Honorable Mention All-GAC in his first year.

== Professional career ==
Fofana played his rookie season with Aveira Esgueira of the Liga Portuguesa de Basquetebol (LPB), with whom he averaged 14.2 points and 6.5 rebounds.

In July 2021, Fofana signed a one-season contract with Sporting CP of the Liga Portuguesa de Basquetebol (LPB) and the FIBA Europe Cup.

Fofana later moved to play for ABC Fighters of the Ivorian Basketball Championship. He was instrumental in ABC's Road to BAL campaign in 2023, as the team won the West Division and Fofana scored 12.8 points per game. The Fighters qualified for their first-ever Basketball Africa League (BAL) season. On 11 March 2023, Fofana scored 21 points in an opening day win over AS Douanes.

In March 2024, Fofana joined AS Douanes. On May 9, 2024, Fofana scored a buzzer-beating game winner against the Rivers Hoopers to win the game 56–54, the first in his career.

== National team career ==
Fofana represented the Ivory Coast national team at the 2023 FIBA AfroCan, and averaged 12.8 points and 5 rebounds per game. He scored 6 points in the game that was lost to Morocco.

== Personal ==
Fofana has three brothers, Mohamed, Moses and Javion.
