= 2025 BAL season group phase =

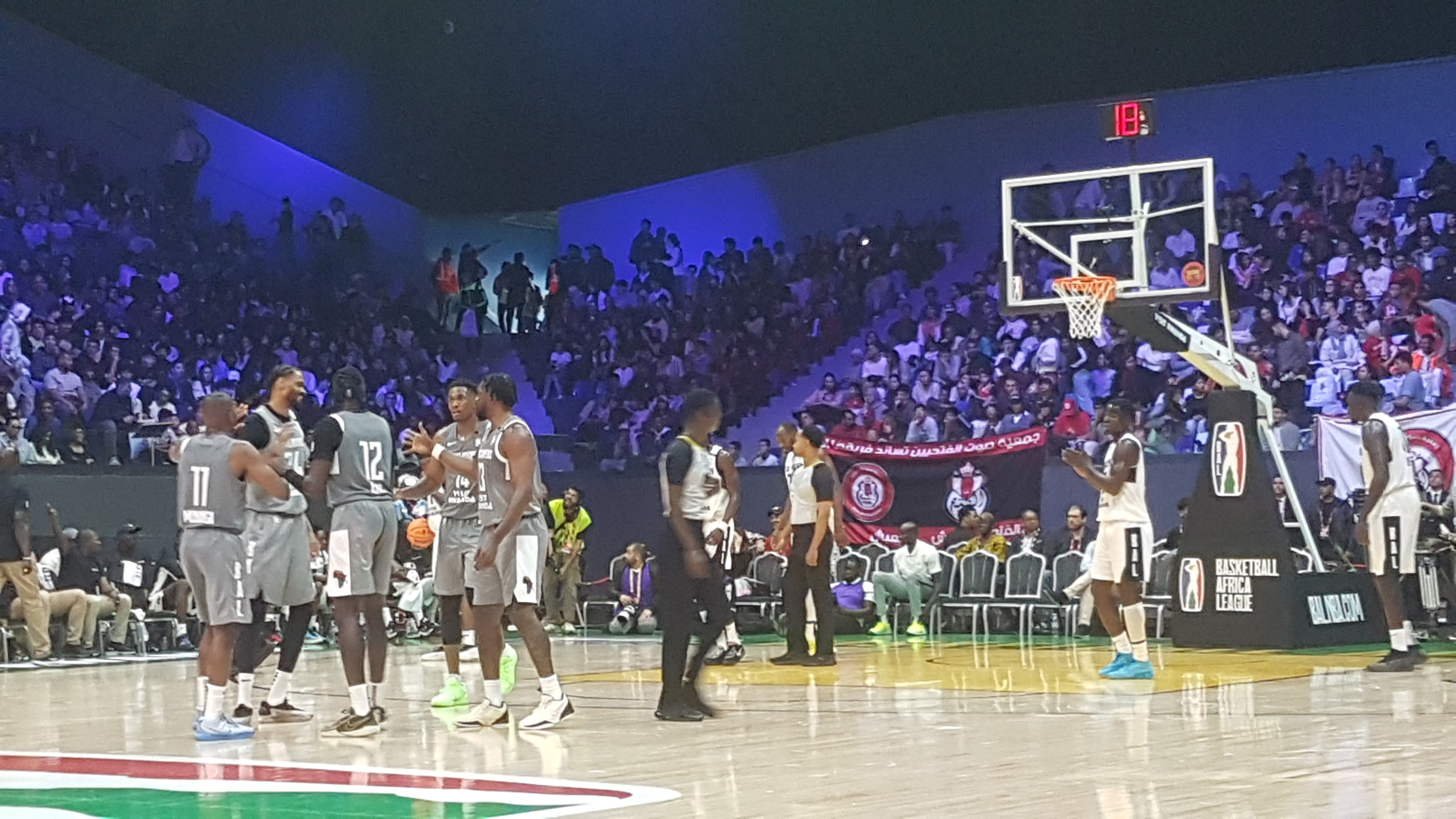
The game between Stade Malien and Rivers Hoopers in the Kalahari Conference

The 2025 BAL season group phase begins on 4 April and will end on 25 May 2024. The 12 teams of the group phase are allocated into three conferences. The BAL announced the official schedule on 28 February 2025.

It is the first time that the any BAL game is hosted in Morocco, and the first time that Kigali hosted a group phase, as the previous games they were hosted were playoffs and finals games.

== Summary and records ==
- On May 18, Al Ahli Tripoli set a new team scoring record with 115 points in a win over the Nairobi City Thunder.
- On May 24, Al Ahli Tripoli and APR set a record for most points combined by two teams in a BAL game after a 106–102 final score; making for a total of 208 points.
- In the Nile Conference, Deon Thompson of Al Ahli Tripoli set a record for the highest efficiency in a BAL game, ending with a score of 43 in the game against the Nairobi City Thunder on May 18.
- MBB center Daniel Craig became the tallest player in BAL history, standing at 7 ft 3 in (2.21 m).

== Tiebreakers ==
The ranking of teams in the regular season was determined as follows:

1. Win-loss record;
2. Head-to-head record;
3. Point differential in the games between the respective teams;
4. Number of points scored in the games between the respective teams;
5. Average point differential in all games against other teams in the Conference;
6. Average number of points scored in all games played against other teams in the Conference;
7. Drawing.

== Kalahari Conference ==
All times are in local time (UTC+01:00).

Pos	Team	Pld	W	L	PF	PA	PD	PCT	Qualification	AIA	RIV	FUS	SMB
1	(Egypt) Al Ittihad Alexandria	6	6	0	526	428	+98	1.000	Advance to playoffs	—	94–77	98–74	91–68
2	(Nigeria) Rivers Hoopers	6	4	2	484	466	+18	.667	Advance to playoffs	80–100	—	88–82	79–59
3	(Morocco) FUS Rabat (H)	6	2	4	456	475	−19	.333	Advance to playoffs	60–71	71–79	—	92–72
4	(Mali) Stade Malien	6	0	6	395	492	−97	.000		69–72	60–81	67–77	—

Source: BAL
Rules for classification: Tiebreakers
(H) Hosts

5 April 2025	Stade Malien (Mali)	60–81	(Nigeria) Rivers Hoopers	Rabat, Morocco
16:00	Scoring by quarter: 23–16, 12–25, 12–21, 13–19
	Pts: Coulibaly 20; Rebs: Doumbya 11; Asts: Coulibaly 6	Boxscore	Pts: Amayo 19; Rebs: Olisemeka 12; Asts: Akec, Shamba 4	Arena: Salle Moulay Abdellah; Attendance: 3,329; Referees: Ian Mcclenny, Oumar Sy, Natascha Onono

5 April 2025	FUS Rabat (Morocco)	60–71	(Egypt) Al Ittihad Alexandria	Rabat, Morocco
19:00	Scoring by quarter: 21–20, 7–17, 18–18, 14–16
	Pts: Jordan 22; Rebs: Jordan, Fofana 5 Asts: Zouzoua 5	Boxscore	Pts: King 19; Rebs: Deng 12; Asts: Vinales 4	Arena: Salle Moulay Abdellah; Attendance: 5,180; Referees: Julian Mcfadden, Erick Otieno, Sarty Nghixulifwa

6 April 2025	Stade Malien (Mali)	69–72	(Egypt) Al Ittihad Alexandria	Rabat, Morocco
16:00	Scoring by quarter: 21–19, 22–18, 11–15, 15–20
	Pts: Diarra 19; Rebs: Doumbya 7 Asts: Coulibaly 5	Boxscore	Pts: Deng 21; Rebs: Khalaf 11; Asts: Vinales 4	Arena: Salle Moulay Abdellah; Referees: Yann Davidson, Arnold Moseya, Dorothy Okatch

6 April 2025	Rivers Hoopers (Nigeria)	88–82	(Morocco) FUS Rabat	Rabat, Morocco
19:00	Scoring by quarter: 23–17, 27–25, 15–25, 23–15
	Pts: Akec 25; Rebs: Olisemeka 14; Asts: Shamba 6	Boxscore	Pts: Zouzoua 21; Rebs: Jordan 9 Asts: Jordan 11	Arena: Salle Moulay Abdellah; Attendance: 4,372; Referees: Leah Lanie, Erik Aellig, Didier Gaga

8 April 2025	Rivers Hoopers (Nigeria)	80–100	(Egypt) Al Ittihad Alexandria	Rabat, Morocco
17:00	Scoring by quarter: 23–25, 19–27, 23–29, 15–19
	Pts: Akec 18; Rebs: Putney 6 Asts: Shamba 8	Boxscore	Pts: Vinales 26; Rebs: Mahmoud 7 Asts: Vinales 7	Arena: Salle Moulay Abdellah; Attendance: 1,015; Referees: Leah Lanie, Arnold Moseya, Didier Gaga

8 April 2025	FUS Rabat (Morocco)	92–72	(Mali) Stade Malien	Rabat, Morocco
20:00	Scoring by quarter: 29–12, 16–29, 21–19, 26–12
	Pts: Zouzoua 22; Rebs: Diagne 6 Asts: Zouita 8	Boxscore	Pts: Doumbya 15; Rebs: Coulibaly 5 Asts: Diarra, Doumbia 5	Arena: Salle Moulay Abdellah; Attendance: 3,520; Referees: Julian McFadden, Yann Vezo Davidson, Natascha Onono

10 April 2025	Al Ittihad Alexandria (Egypt)	91–68	(Mali) Stade Malien	Rabat, Morocco
17:00	Scoring by quarter: 20–15, 22–15, 20–15, 29–23
	Pts: King 22; Rebs: Deng 9 Asts: Metwaly 5	Boxscore	Pts: Coulibaly 25; Rebs: Enan 8 Asts: Coulibaly, Enan 3	Arena: Salle Moulay Abdellah; Attendance: 915; Referees: Ian Mcclenny, Erick Otieno, Sarty Nghixulifwa

10 April 2025	FUS Rabat (Morocco)	71–79	(Nigeria) Rivers Hoopers	Rabat, Morocco
20:00	Scoring by quarter: 19–20, 17–11, 22–22, 13–26
	Pts: Fofana 14; Rebs: Diagne 9 Asts: Zouita 6	Boxscore	Pts: Akec 17; Rebs: Olisemeka 13; Asts: Amayo 7	Arena: Salle Moulay Abdellah; Attendance: 4,978; Referees: Erik Aellig, Oumar Sy, Dorothy Okatch

12 April 2025	Al Ittihad Alexandria (Egypt)	94–77	(Nigeria) Rivers Hoopers	Rabat, Morocco
16:00	Scoring by quarter: 19–19, 30–10, 26–27, 19–21
	Pts: Deng 18; Rebs: Mahmoud 10; Asts: Vinales 7	Boxscore	Pts: Akec 17; Rebs: Olisemeka 16; Asts: Amayo 8	Arena: Salle Moulay Abdellah; Referees: Ian Mcclenny, Yann Vezo Davidson, Natascha Onono

12 April 2025	Stade Malien (Mali)	67–77	(Morocco) FUS Rabat	Rabat, Morocco
19:00	Scoring by quarter: 15–18, 16–22, 17–17, 19–20
	Pts: Coulibaly 26; Rebs: Doumbya; Asts: Three players 3	Boxscore	Pts: Jordan 18; Rebs: Diagne, Fofana 9 Asts: Fofana 6	Arena: Salle Moulay Abdellah; Attendance: 5,279; Referees: Erik Aellig, Arnold Moseya, Dorothy Okatch

13 April 2025	Rivers Hoopers (Nigeria)	79–59	(Mali) Stade Malien	Rabat, Morocco
16:00	Scoring by quarter: 27–21, 27–10, 20–7, 15–21
	Pts: Putney 15; Rebs: Olisemeka 9 Asts: Olisemeka 6	Boxscore	Pts: Tounkara 14; Rebs: Doumbya 8 Asts: Sane 3	Arena: Salle Moulay Abdellah; Referees: Julian McFadden, Erick Otieno, Sarty Nghixulifwa

13 April 2025	Al Ittihad Alexandria (Egypt)	98–74	(Morocco) FUS Rabat	Rabat, Morocco
19:00	Scoring by quarter: 17–19, 30–11, 26–11, 25–33
	Pts: Metwaly 19; Rebs: Khalaf, Mahmoud 8 Asts: Mido 4	Boxscore	Pts: Zouzoua 22; Rebs: Zouita 10; Asts: Zouita 6	Arena: Salle Moulay Abdellah; Attendance: 5,239; Referees: Leah Lanie, Oumar Sy, Didier Gaga

== Sahara Conference ==
Pos	Team	Pld	W	L	PF	PA	PD	PCT	Qualification	USM	APL	KRS	AVD
1	(Tunisia) US Monastir	6	4	2	478	444	+34	.667	Advance to playoffs	—	87–73	88–72	77–68
2	(Angola) Petro de Luanda	6	3	3	463	432	+31	.500 (Note: Head-to-head: Petro de Luanda 1–1 Kriol Star, +26 point differential.)	Advance to playoffs	78–68	—	69–71	76–67
3	(Cape Verde) Kriol Star	6	3	3	461	506	−45	.500	Advance to playoffs	83–91	74–103	—	66–63
4	(Senegal) ASC Ville de Dakar (H)	6	2	4	425	445	−20	.333		70–67	65–64	92–95	—

Source: BAL
Rules for classification: Tiebreakers
(H) Hosts
Notes:

26 April 2025	Kriol Star (Cape Verde)	74–103	(Angola) Petro de Luanda	Dakar, Senegal
14:30	Scoring by quarter: 14–24, 16–21, 21–26, 33–32
	Pts: Pack 17; Rebs: Mendes 7 Asts: Parker 7	Boxscore	Pts: Gakou 19; Rebs: Moreira 8 Asts: Dundão 13	Arena: Dakar Arena; Attendance: 2,305; Referees: Nate Cearley, Mbaye Seye, Haytham Ihaqaf

26 April 2025	ASC Ville de Dakar (Senegal)	70–67	(Tunisia) US Monastir	Dakar, Senegal
17:30	Scoring by quarter: 20–18, 22–16, 8–16, 20–17
	Pts: Majok 10; Rebs: Ndiaye 15; Asts: Harouna 7	Boxscore	Pts: Slimane 15; Rebs: Slimane, Eldridge 3 Asts: Lahyani 12	Arena: Dakar Arena; Attendance: 9,271; Referees: Ryan Johnson, Kalume Tonton Banza, Guy Sani Kollo

27 April 2025	US Monastir (Tunisia)	87–73	(Angola) Petro de Luanda	Dakar, Senegal
14:30	Scoring by quarter: 22–17, 23–29, 17–22, 11–19
	Pts: Sané 24; Rebs: Lahyani 9 Asts: Sayeh 5	Boxscore	Pts: Anosike 16; Rebs: Moreira 9 Asts: Dundão 6	Arena: Dakar Arena; Attendance: 1,768; Referees: Amr Aboolo, Kingsley Ojeaburu, Annie Joyce Muchenu

27 April 2025	Kriol Star (Cape Verde)	66–63	(Senegal) ASC Ville de Dakar	Dakar, Senegal
17:30	Scoring by quarter: 15–20, 18–12, 20–14, 13–17
	Pts: Pack 19; Rebs: Almeida 14; Asts: Parker 6	Boxscore	Pts: Perry 23; Rebs: Majok 4 Asts: Majok 4	Arena: Dakar Arena; Attendance: 8,139; Referees: Kastine Evans, Jonathan Primm, Aya Ahmed

29 April 2025	US Monastir (Tunisia)	88–72	(Cape Verde) Kriol Star	Dakar, Senegal
16:00	Scoring by quarter: 17–18, 28–12, 19–17, 24–25
	Pts: Hardy 19; Rebs: Eldridge 9 Asts: Hardy, Lahyani 8	Boxscore	Pts: Almeida 22; Rebs: Almeida 13; Asts: Parker 6	Arena: Dakar Arena; Attendance: 1,127; Referees: Ryan Johnson, Kalume Tonton Banza, Guy Sani Kollo

29 April 2025	ASC Ville de Dakar (Senegal)	65–64	(Angola) Petro de Luanda	Dakar, Senegal
19:00	Scoring by quarter: 18–16, 15–21, 19–13, 13–14
	Pts: Gueye 16; Rebs: Gueye, Ndiaye 11; Asts: three players 4	Boxscore	Pts: Gardner 19; Rebs: Gardner 10; Asts: Dundão, Moreira 5	Arena: Dakar Arena; Attendance: 4,556; Referees: Nate Cearley, Aboollo Amr, Annie Joyce Muchenu

1 May 2025	Petro de Luanda (Angola)	78–68	(Tunisia) US Moanstir	Dakar, Senegal
14:30	Scoring by quarter: 16–16, 14–21, 20–13, 28–18
	Pts: Mendoza 21; Rebs: Mendoza 11; Asts: Mendoza 4	Boxscore	Pts: Hardy 16; Rebs: Lahyani 9 Asts: Eldridge 4	Arena: Dakar Arena; Attendance: 2,304; Referees: Evans Kastine, Ojeaburu Kingsley, Seye Mbaye

1 May 2025	ASC Ville de Dakar (Senegal)	92–95(OT)	(Cape Verde) Kriol Star	Dakar, Senegal
17:30	Scoring by quarter: 23–18, 17–21, 27–29, 16–15, Overtime: 9–12
	Pts: Gueye 20; Rebs: Daly Fal, Majok 9 Asts: Niang, Perry 6	Boxscore	Pts: McGlynn 29; Rebs: Almeida 9 Asts: Parker 9	Arena: Dakar Arena; Attendance: 7,475; Referees: Jonathan Primm, Haytham Ihaqaf, Aya Ahmed

3 May 2025	Kriol Star (Cape Verde)	83–91	(Tunisia) US Monastir	Dakar, Senegal
14:30	Scoring by quarter: 17–29, 17–19, 21–19, 28–24
	Pts: Ntambwe 21; Rebs: Ntambwe 8 Asts: Parker 10	Boxscore	Pts: Hardy 29; Rebs: Lahyani 8 Asts: Hardy 6	Arena: Dakar Arena; Attendance: 2,704; Referees: Jonathan Primm, Mbaye Seye, Aya Ahmed

3 May 2025	Petro de Luanda (Angola)	76–67	(Senegal) ASC Ville de Dakar	Dakar, Senegal
17:30	Scoring by quarter: 25–18, 22–14, 16–22, 13–14
	Pts: Mendoza 14; Rebs: Moreira 10; Asts: Domingos 5	Boxscore	Pts: Perry 18; Rebs: Daly Fall 13; Asts: Daly Fall 6	Arena: Dakar Arena; Attendance: 9,250; Referees: Kastine Evans, Kalume Tonton Banza, Annie Joyce Muchenu

4 May 2025	Kriol Star (Cape Verde)	71–69(OT)	(Angola) Petro de Luanda	Dakar, Senegal
14:30	Scoring by quarter: 20–7, 20–12, 13–18, 9–25, Overtime: 9–7
	Pts: Correia 16; Rebs: Almeida 13; Asts: Almeida 8	Boxscore	Pts: Buiamba 16; Rebs: Gardner 9 Asts: Diabate 9	Arena: Dakar Arena

4 May 2025	ASC Ville de Dakar (Senegal)	68–77	(Tunisia) US Monastir	Dakar, Senegal
17:30	Scoring by quarter: 15–16, 17–22, 15–14, 22–24
	Pts: Perry 20; Rebs: Gueye 11; Asts: Perry 7	Boxscore	Pts: Eldridge 22; Rebs: Sané 12; Asts: Eldridge 4	Arena: Dakar Arena; Attendance: 8,879; Referees: Nate Cearley, Kingsley Ojeaburu, Haytham Ihaqaf

== Nile Conference ==
Pos	Team	Pld	W	L	PF	PA	PD	PCT	Qualification	AHT	APR	MBB	NCT
1	(Libya) Al Ahli Tripoli	6	6	0	604	498	+106	1.000	Advance to playoffs	—	106–102	102–73	104–91
2	(Rwanda) APR (H)	6	3	3	530	508	+22	.500	Advance to playoffs	68–90	—	88–94	92–63
3	(South Africa) MBB	6	2	4	476	539	−63	.333		73–102	81–103	—	76–85
4	(Kenya) Nairobi City Thunder	6	1	5	474	539	−65	.167		87–115	74–77	74–75	—

Source: BAL
Rules for classification: Tiebreakers
(H) Hosts

17 May 2025	MBB (South Africa)	77–87	(Libya) Al Ahli Tripoli	Kigali, Rwanda
14:30	Scoring by quarter: 15–20, 18–25, 17–19, 27–23
	Pts: Mooring 26; Rebs: Three players 7 Asts: Mooring, Lenard 3	Boxscore	Pts: Boissy 28; Rebs: Sadi 13; Asts: Adams, Badrush 5	Arena: BK Arena; Attendance: 3,557; Referees: Kenneth Gardner, Hassane Kamate, Asmae Benkhadra

17 May 2025	APR (Rwanda)	92–63	(Kenya) Nairobi City Thunder	Kigali, Rwanda
17:30	Scoring by quarter: 22–23, 17–8, 20–21, 33–11
	Pts: Diarra 23; Rebs: Diarra 12; Asts: Habimana 9	Boxscore	Pts: Ongwae 14; Rebs: Ongwae 9 Asts: Iroegbu 4	Arena: BK Arena; Attendance: 5,968; Referees: Cameron Garber, Wael Ibrahim Mostafa, Silver Houngbedji

18 May 2025	Nairobi City Thunder (Kenya)	87–115	(Libya) Al Ahli Tripoli	Kigali, Rwanda
14:30	Scoring by quarter: 18–24, 20–29, 15–28, 34–34
	Pts: Iroegbu 18; Rebs: Diong 8 Asts: Iroegbu 8	Boxscore	Pts: Boissy 30; Rebs: Thompson 14; Asts: Adams 7	Arena: BK Arena; Attendance: 3,225; Referees: Jean Sauveur Ruhamiriza, Amir Taboubi, Claudio Eiuba

18 May 2025	MBB (South Africa)	81–103	(Rwanda) APR	Kigali, Rwanda
17:30	Scoring by quarter: 26–23, 21–22, 12–28, 22–30
	Pts: Lenard 20; Rebs: Sibanyoni 7 Asts: Mooring 6	Boxscore	Pts: Ndoye 25; Rebs: Diarra 14; Asts: Habimana 8	Arena: BK Arena; Attendance: 4,946; Referees: Maripier Malo, Gina Catanzariti, Mahamadou Diallo

20 May 2025	Nairobi City Thunder (Kenya)	74–75	(South Africa) MBB	Kigali, Rwanda
16:00	Scoring by quarter: 15–22, 18–10, 27–18, 14–25
	Pts: Ganapamo 21; Rebs: Adera 7 Asts: Adera 5	Boxscore	Pts: Prinsloo 30; Rebs: Prinsloo 11; Asts: Lenard, Mooring 5	Arena: BK Arena; Attendance: 3,279; Referees: Cameron Garber, Jean Sauveur Ruhamiriza, Mahamadou Diallo

20 May 2025	APR (Rwanda)	68–90	(Libya) Al Ahli Tripoli	Kigali, Rwanda
19:00	Scoring by quarter: 17–11, 24–31, 11–19, 16–29
	Pts: Noel, Randle 18; Rebs: Ndoye 12; Asts: Miller Jr. 4	Boxscore	Pts: Boissy 27; Rebs: Sadi 10; Asts: Agada 5	Arena: BK Arena; Attendance: 5,937; Referees: Kenneth Gardner, Amir Taboubi, Hassane Kamate

22 May 2025	Al Ahli Tripoli (Libya)	104–91	(Kenya) Nairobi City Thunder	Kigali, Rwanda
16:00	Scoring by quarter: 32–24, 24–17, 27–18, 21–32
	Pts: Boissy 26; Rebs: Sadi 13; Asts: Agada 7	Boxscore	Pts: Iroegbu 23; Rebs: Adera 12; Asts: Diing 9	Arena: BK Arena; Attendance: 2,674; Referees: Maripier Malo, Wael Ibrahim Mostafa, Silver Houngbedji

22 May 2025	APR (Rwanda)	88–94	(South Africa) MBB	Kigali, Rwanda
19:00	Scoring by quarter: 15–16, 24–22, 19–29, 30–27
	Pts: Noel 23; Rebs: Ndoye 10; Asts: Habimana 6	Boxscore	Pts: Mooring 29; Rebs: Craig 10; Asts: Mooring 5	Arena: BK Arena; Attendance: 5,337; Referees: Gina Catanzariti, Claudio Eiuba, Asmae Benkhadra

24 May 2025	MBB (South Africa)	76–85	(Kenya) Nairobi City Thunder	Kigali, Rwanda
14:30	Scoring by quarter: 24–20, 15–21, 15–14, 22–30
	Pts: Lenard 39; Rebs: Lenard, Sibanyoni 9 Asts: Sibanyoni 2	Boxscore	Pts: Odero 23; Rebs: Adera 14; Asts: Iroegbu 7	Arena: BK Arena; Attendance: 3,251; Referees: Gina Catanzariti, Amir Taboubi, Hassane Kamate

24 May 2025	Al Ahli Tripoli (Libya)	106–102	(Rwanda) APR	Kigali, Rwanda
17:30	Scoring by quarter: 28–26, 25–23, 31–21, 22–32
	Pts: Adams 26; Rebs: Sadi 8 Asts: Adams 8	Boxscore	Pts: Noel 30; Rebs: Three players 6 Asts: Habimana 10	Arena: BK Arena; Attendance: 6,463; Referees: Maripier Malo, Wael Ibrahim Mostafa, Claudio Eiuba

25 May 2025	Al Ahli Tripoli (Libya)	102–73	(South Africa) MBB	Kigali, Rwanda
14:30	Scoring by quarter: 23–16, 19–18, 27–14, 33–25
	Pts: Adams 28; Rebs: Marei 10; Asts: Badrush 5	Boxscore	Pts: Lenard 18; Rebs: Lenard 11; Asts: Mooring 5	Arena: BK Arena; Attendance: 3,632; Referees: Jean Sauveur Ruhamiriza, Silver Houngbedji, Amir Taboubi

25 May 2025	Nairobi City Thunder (Kenya)	74–77	(Rwanda) APR	Kigali, Rwanda
17:30	Scoring by quarter: 19–17, 26–18, 16–20, 13–22
	Pts: Odero 29; Rebs: Davis 10; Asts: Iroegbu 5	Boxscore	Pts: Diarra 22; Rebs: Diarra 17; Asts: Randle 5	Arena: BK Arena; Attendance: 6,606; Referees: Kenneth Gardner, Asmae Benkhadra, Mahamadou Diallo

== Ranking of third-placed teams ==
Pos	Grp	Team	Pld	W	L	PF	PA	PD	PCT	Qualification
1	Sahara	(Cape Verde) Kriol Star	6	3	3	461	506	−45	.500	Advance to playoffs
2	Kalahari	(Morocco) FUS Rabat	6	2	4	456	475	−19	.333	Advance to playoffs
3	Nile	(South Africa) MBB	6	2	4	476	539	−63	.333	

Source: BAL
