= 2024–25 Stade Malien basketball season =

20th season of the Stade Malien basketball club

Stade Malien (basketball)
2025 season
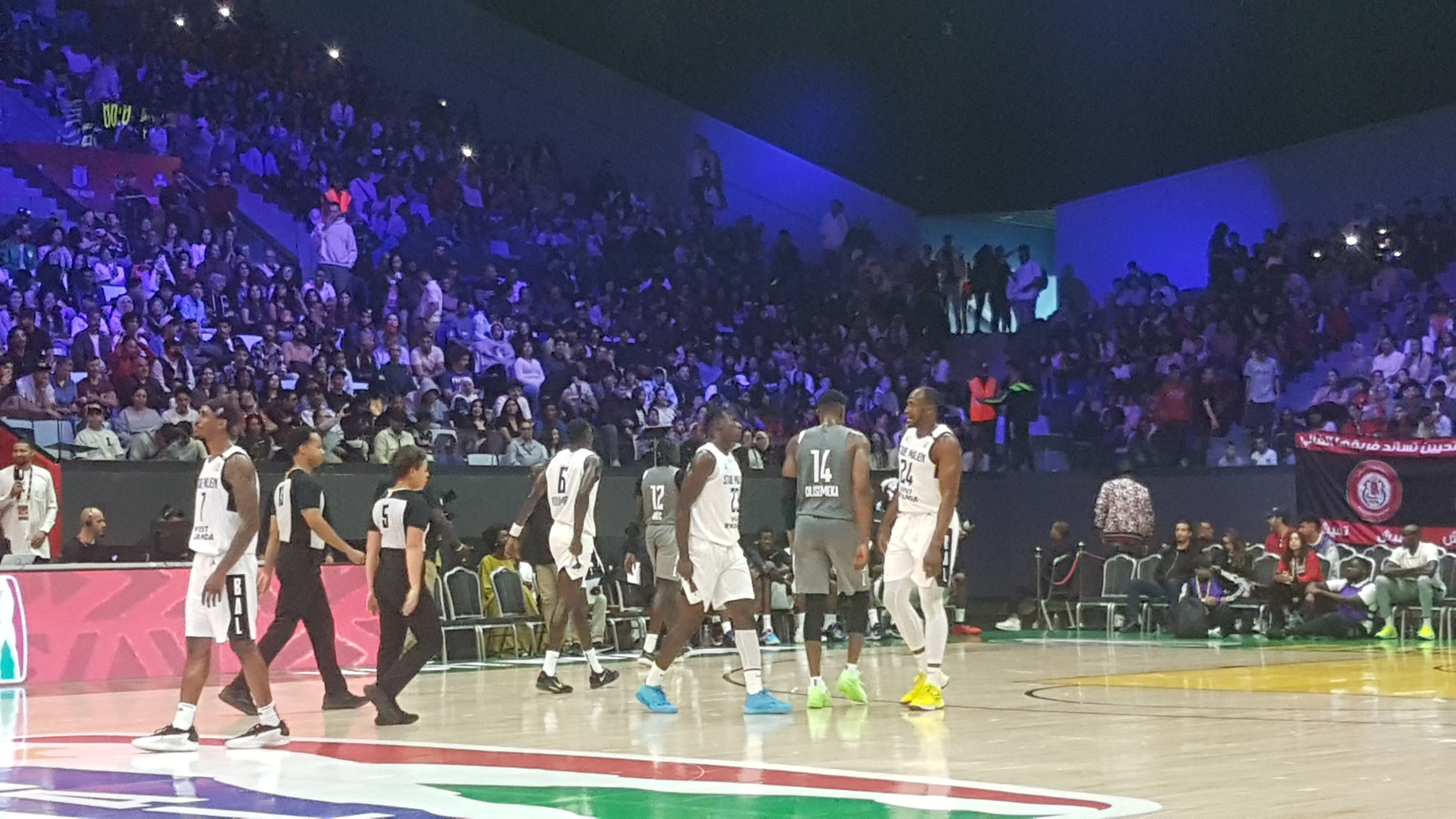
- Stade Malien in the opening game of the 2025 BAL season in April
- Head coach: Boubacar Kanouté
- Ligue 1: Runners-up (lost to CRB Tombouctou)
- BAL: Group phase (4th place in Kalahari Conference)
- Scoring leader: Mahamane Coulibaly 14.7
- Rebounding leader: Mouhamed Doumbya 6.3
- Assists leader: Mahamane Coulibaly 2.2

The 2025 Stade Malen men's basketball season is the 65th season in club history and the 2nd season of the team in the Basketball Africa League (BAL). The Whites of Bamako qualified for their second BAL after Road to BAL.

After a third place in 2023, Stade Malien did not qualify for the BAL the previous season as they withdrew their place in the qualifying tournament due to financial reasons. This season, Boubacar Kanouté took over the team from Kaba Kanté.

In the buildup for the Road to BAL, the team acquired Cartier Diarra, who had previously played with the Cape Town Tigers, They officially qualified on November 10, 2024, following the semifinal win over KSA from Cameroon.

In the 2025 BAL season, Stade Malien lost all six games in the Kalahari Conference of the group phase, and was thus eliminated. They became the first team in league history to finish a season 0–6.

In the 2024–25 Ligue 1, Stade Malien lost the finals to CRB Tombouctou by a 2–3 score.

== Roster ==
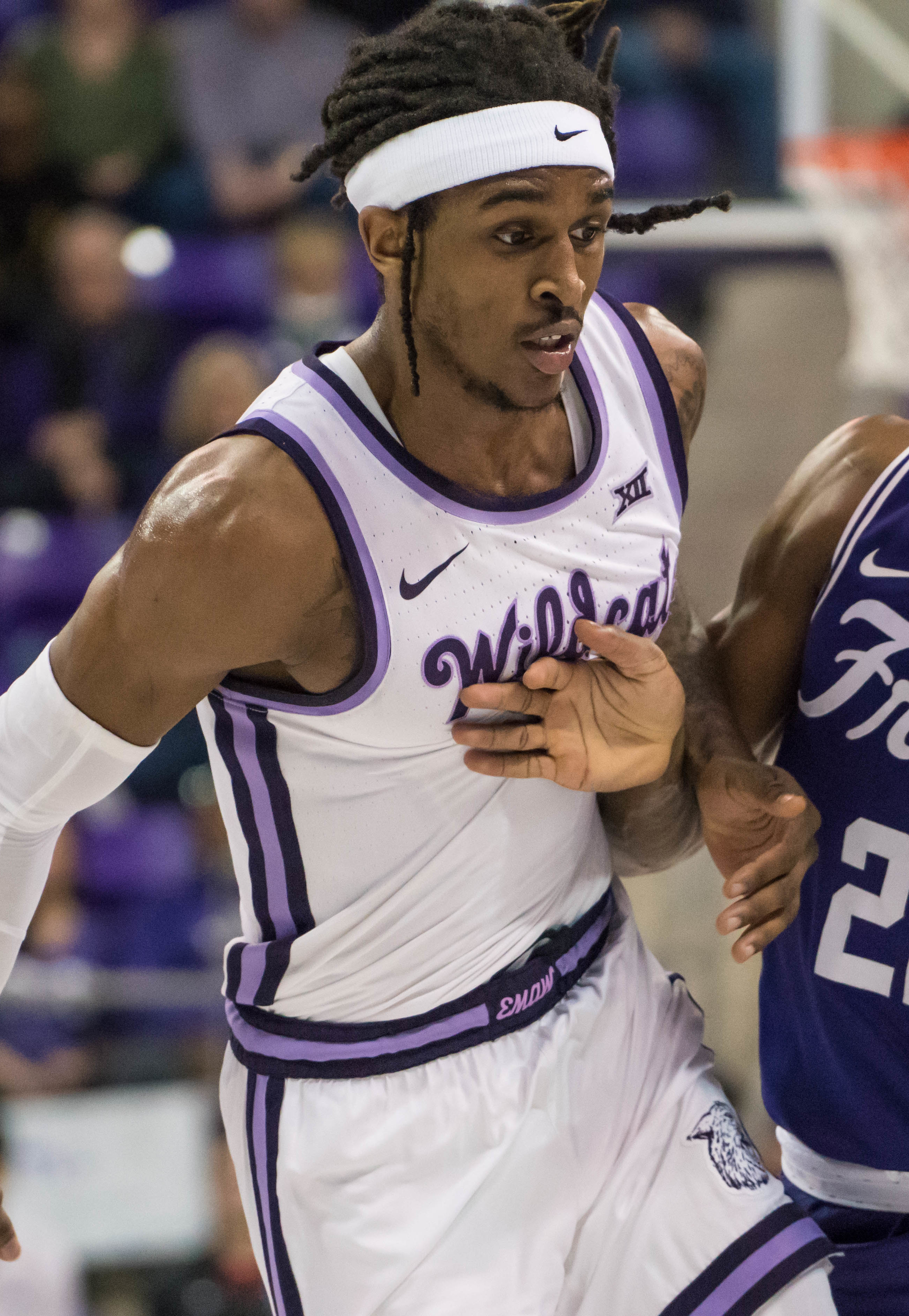
Cartier Diarra was the team's starting point guard in both the BAL qualifying rounds and proper tournament

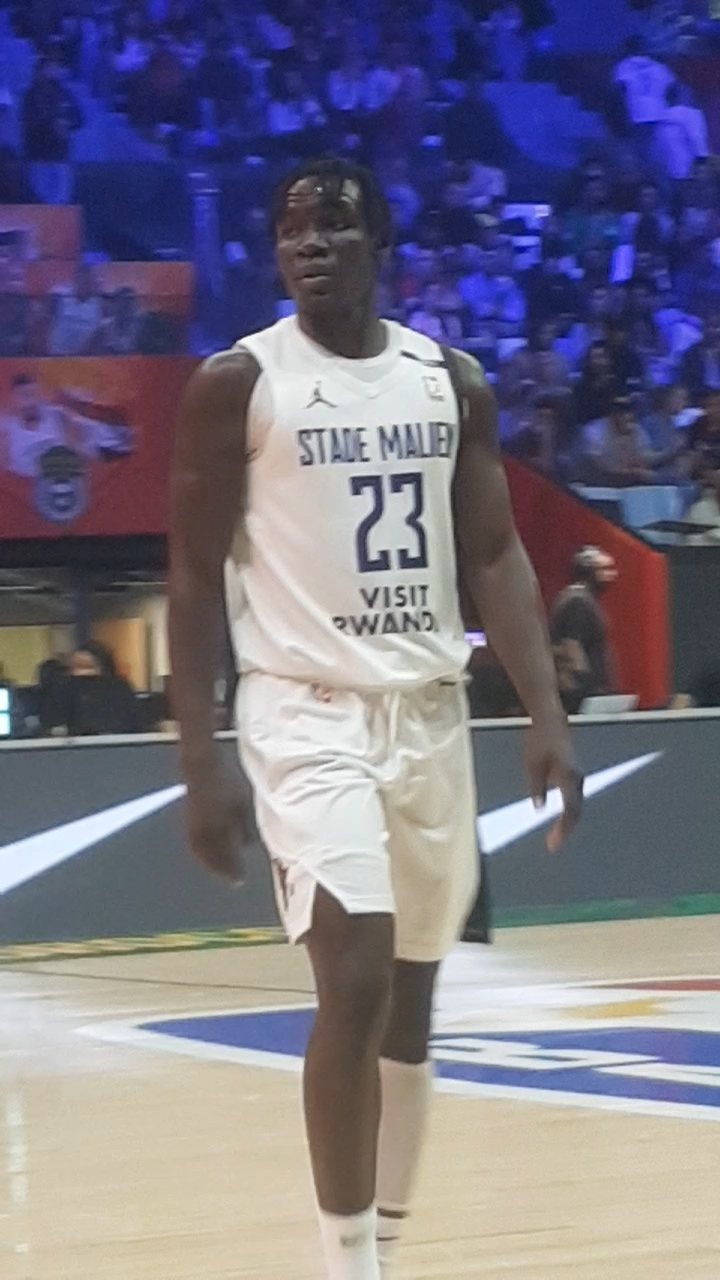
Mahamane Coulibaly led Stade Malien in scoring in the BAL main tournament

The following was Stade Malien's roster for the 2025 BAL season.

Note: Flags indicate national team eligibility at FIBA-sanctioned events. Players may hold other non-FIBA nationalities not displayed.

2025 Stade Malien roster
Players
Coaches

Pos.	No.	Nat.	Name	Ht.	Age
F	4	(Mali)	Tounkara, Hinda Mady	2.05 m (6 ft 9 in)	21 – 30 June 2003
G/F	6	(Senegal)	Doumbya, Mouhamed (I)	1.99 m (6 ft 6 in)	28 – 27 March 1997
G	7	(Mali)	Diarra, Cartier (DP)	1.90 m (6 ft 3 in)	27 – 6 February 1998
SF	10	(Senegal)	Sambe, Ousseynou (E)	2.06 m (6 ft 9 in)	18 – 20 October 2006
PF/C	13	(Mali)	Thiero, Abdrahamane	2.00 m (6 ft 7 in)	22 – 9 November 2002
PG	14	(Mali)	Togo, Allaye	1.83 m (6 ft 0 in)	21 – 8 August 2003
C	15	(Mali)	Haidara, Abdoulaye	2.07 m (6 ft 9 in)	22 – 11 March 2003
F	23	(Mali)	Coulibaly, Mahamane	2.06 m (6 ft 9 in)	24 – 28 January 2001
C	24	(Mali)	Doucoure, Mamadou	2.10 m (6 ft 11 in)	26 – 28 September 1998
PF	28	(Mali)	Dade, Haman	1.98 m (6 ft 6 in)	22 – 18 April 2003
PF/C	34	(Ivory Coast)	Enan, Romeo (I)	2.10 m (6 ft 11 in)	31 – 29 September 1993
PF/C	41	(Senegal)	Sane, Landing (I)	2.10 m (6 ft 11 in)	34 – 19 December 1990
CG	45	(Mali)	Fofana, Gaoussou	1.93 m (6 ft 4 in)	24 – 25 December 2000

Head coach

- (Mali) Kaba Kanté

Assistant coach(es)

- (Mali) Boubacar Kounaté

Legend

- (C) Team captain
- (I) Import player
- (E): BAL Elevate player
- Injured

- Roster
Updated: April 4, 2025

== Transactions ==
=== Additions ===
Date	Player	Former team
N/A	Cartier Diarra	(South Africa) Cape Town Tigers
March 29, 2025	Romeo Enan	(Oman) Al Seeb
April 3, 2025 (Note: The roster was officially released before the first game of the season on the official BAL website.)	Landing Sané	(France) Fos-sur-mer
April 3, 2025	Mouhamed Doumbya	(Senegal) ASC Ville de Dakar
April 3, 2025	Ousseynou Sambe	NBA Academy Africa

== Games ==
=== Road to BAL ===
==== First round ====
Group A

Pos	Team	Pld	W	L	PF	PA	PD	Pts	Qualification
1	(Libya) Al Ahli Tripoli (H)	2	2	0	185	143	+42	4	Advance to Elite 16
2	(Mali) Stade Malien	2	1	1	147	161	−14	3	Advance to Elite 16
3	(Cape Verde) Kriol Star (W)	2	0	2	153	181	−28	2	Advance to Elite 16

Source: FIBA
(H) Hosts; (W) Wild card

10 October 2024	Al Ahli Tripoli (Libya)	85–66	(Mali) Stade Malien	Tripoli
19:30 (GMT+2)	Scoring by quarter: 32–11, 14–21, 15–20, 24–14
	Pts: Eric 23; Rebs: Almeida 13; Asts: Almeida, Hodge 7	Boxscore	Pts: Coulibaly 20; Rebs: Pare 8 Asts: Keïta 8	Arena: Great Hall; Referees: BANZA KALUME, Tonton (COD), GAGA, Didier (RWA),LAROUCI, Adlen (ALG)

11 October 2024	Stade Malien (Mali)	81–76	(Cape Verde) Kriol Star	Tripoli
19:30 (GMT+2)	Scoring by quarter: 20–20, 16–21, 24–17, 21–16
	Pts: Coulibaly, Kanoute 16; Rebs: Pare 11; Asts: Kante 5	Boxscore	Pts: Lahrichi, Ndizeye 14; Rebs: Brown 12; Asts: Lahrichi 7	Arena: Great Hall; Referees: KAMATE, Hassane (CIV), BANZA KALUME, Tonton (COD), TABOUBI, Amir (TUN)

==== Elite 16 ====
===== Group phase =====
Pos	Team	Pld	W	L	PF	PA	PD	Pts	Qualification	SMAL	ABC	CHS	MDA
1	(Mali) Stade Malien	3	3	0	241	198	+43	6	Advance to final round	—	90–80	72–65	79–53
2	(Ivory Coast) ABC Fighters	3	1	2	255	229	+26	4	Advance to final round	80–90	—	85–88	90–51
3	(Democratic Republic of the Congo) Chaux Sport	3	1	2	218	229	−11	4		65–72	88–85	—	65–72
4	(Gabon) MDA Basket	3	1	2	176	234	−58	4		53–79	51–90	72–65	—

Source: FIBA

===== Semifinals =====
9 November 2024	Stade Malien (Mali)	80–59	(Cameroon) KSA	Abidjan, Ivory Coast
16:30	Scoring by quarter: 17–14, 28–14, 18–15, 17–16
	Pts: Coulibaly 19; Rebs: Djambo 11; Asts: Keïta 7	Boxscore	Pts: Kadji 12; Rebs: Bileg 10; Asts: Nzeulie 3	Arena: Palais des Sports de Treichville; Attendance: 110

===== Final =====
10 November 2024	Stade Malien (Mali)	68–71	(Libya) Al Ahli Tripoli	Abidjan, Ivory Coast
19:30	Scoring by quarter: 16–30, 22–24, 16–11, 14–6
	Pts: Kanoute 19; Rebs: Dade Haman, Kanoute 7 Asts: Kante 7	Boxscore	Pts: Badrush 26; Rebs: Deng 15; Asts: Sadi 5	Arena: Palais des Sports de Treichville; Attendance: 1,050; Referees: Tonton Banza Kalume (COD), Walelign Fikadu Gebeto (ETH), Hassane Kamate (CIV)

=== BAL ===
==== Kahalari Conference ====
Pos	Team	Pld	W	L	PF	PA	PD	PCT	Qualification
1	(Egypt) Al Ittihad Alexandria	6	6	0	526	428	+98	1.000	Advance to playoffs
2	(Nigeria) Rivers Hoopers	6	4	2	484	466	+18	.667	Advance to playoffs
3	(Morocco) FUS Rabat (H)	6	2	4	456	475	−19	.333	Advance to playoffs
4	(Mali) Stade Malien	6	0	6	395	492	−97	.000	

Source: BAL
Rules for classification: Tiebreakers
(H) Hosts

5 April 2025	Stade Malien (Mali)	60–81	(Nigeria) Rivers Hoopers	Rabat, Morocco
16:00	Scoring by quarter: 23–16, 12–25, 12–21, 13–19
	Pts: Coulibaly 20; Rebs: Doumbya 11; Asts: Coulibaly 6	Boxscore	Pts: Amayo 19; Rebs: Olisemeka 12; Asts: Akec, Shamba 4	Arena: Salle Moulay Abdellah; Attendance: 3,329; Referees: Ian Mcclenny, Oumar Sy, Natascha Onono

6 April 2025	Stade Malien (Mali)	69–72	(Egypt) Al Ittihad Alexandria	Rabat, Morocco
16:00	Scoring by quarter: 21–19, 22–18, 11–15, 15–20
	Pts: Diarra 19; Rebs: Doumbya 7 Asts: Coulibaly 5	Boxscore	Pts: Deng 21; Rebs: Khalaf 11; Asts: Vinales 4	Arena: Salle Moulay Abdellah; Referees: Yann Davidson, Arnold Moseya, Dorothy Okatch

8 April 2025	FUS Rabat (Morocco)	92–72	(Mali) Stade Malien	Rabat, Morocco
20:00	Scoring by quarter: 29–12, 16–29, 21–19, 26–12
	Pts: Zouzoua 22; Rebs: Diagne 6 Asts: Zouita 8	Boxscore	Pts: Doumbya 15; Rebs: Coulibaly 5 Asts: Diarra, Doumbia 5	Arena: Salle Moulay Abdellah; Attendance: 3,520; Referees: Julian McFadden, Yann Vezo Davidson, Natascha Onono

10 April 2025	Al Ittihad Alexandria (Egypt)	91–68	(Mali) Stade Malien	Rabat, Morocco
17:00	Scoring by quarter: 20–15, 22–15, 20–15, 29–23
	Pts: King 22; Rebs: Deng 9 Asts: Metwaly 5	Boxscore	Pts: Coulibaly 25; Rebs: Enan 8 Asts: Coulibaly, Enan 3	Arena: Salle Moulay Abdellah; Attendance: 915; Referees: Ian Mcclenny, Erick Otieno, Sarty Nghixulifwa

12 April 2025	Stade Malien (Mali)	67–77	(Morocco) FUS Rabat	Rabat, Morocco
19:00	Scoring by quarter: 15–18, 16–22, 17–17, 19–20
	Pts: Coulibaly 26; Rebs: Doumbya; Asts: Three players 3	Boxscore	Pts: Jordan 18; Rebs: Diagne, Fofana 9 Asts: Fofana 6	Arena: Salle Moulay Abdellah; Attendance: 5,279; Referees: Erik Aellig, Arnold Moseya, Dorothy Okatch

13 April 2025	Rivers Hoopers (Nigeria)	79–59	(Mali) Stade Malien	Rabat, Morocco
16:00	Scoring by quarter: 27–21, 27–10, 20–7, 15–21
	Pts: Putney 15; Rebs: Olisemeka 9 Asts: Olisemeka 6	Boxscore	Pts: Tounkara 14; Rebs: Doumbya 8 Asts: Sane 3	Arena: Salle Moulay Abdellah; Referees: Julian McFadden, Erick Otieno, Sarty Nghixulifwa
