= 2025 Rivers Hoopers season =

20th season of the Rivers Hoopers basketball club

Rivers Hoopers
2025 season
- Head coach: Ogoh Odaudu
- NPL: Quarterfinalist (eliminated by APR)

The 2025 Rivers Hoopers season is the 20th season in club history and the 3rd season of the team in the Basketball Africa League (BAL). The Hoopers will play in the Nigerian Premier League (NPL) as defending champions. They were eliminated in the BAL quarterfinals by APR.

== Roster ==
Will Perry signed with ASC Ville de Dakar, John Wilkins retired.

Meanwhile, Kelvin Amayo, who led the team to the 2024 Nigerian Premier League title, returned to the Hoopers. Madut Akec, who played in the 2024 BAL season with AS Douanes, was also signed.

=== BAL roster ===
Note: Flags indicate national team eligibility at FIBA-sanctioned events. Players may hold other non-FIBA nationalities not displayed.

2025 Rivers Hoopers roster
Players
Coaches

Pos.	No.	Nat.	Name	Ht.	Age
SG	2	(Nigeria)	Offia, Abel	1.96 m (6 ft 5 in)	21 – 14 February 2005
PG	5	(Nigeria)	Afuwape, Micheal	1.88 m (6 ft 2 in)	27 – 17 August 1998
PF	7	(Nigeria)	Nwaiwu, Onyebuchi	2.01 m (6 ft 7 in)	27 – 20 August 1998
	10	(Nigeria)	Anaiye, Johnson	2.06 m (6 ft 9 in)	28 – 6 November 1997
PG	11	(Democratic Republic of the Congo)	Shamba, Maxi Munanga	1.90 m (6 ft 3 in)	32 – 25 December 1993
SG	12	(Australia)	Akec, Madut (I)	2.03 m (6 ft 8 in)	27 – 1 January 1999
SG	13	(Nigeria)	Amayo, Kelvin	1.96 m (6 ft 5 in)	34 – 9 January 1992
C	14	(Nigeria)	Olisemeka, Peter	2.06 m (6 ft 9 in)	34 – 9 December 1991
PF	15	(Nigeria)	Sani, Samuel	2.10 m (6 ft 11 in)	18 – 9 July 2007
SF	23	(Nigeria)	Koko Jr., Ifeanyi	2.03 m (6 ft 8 in)	21 – 8 December 2004
SF	24	(United States)	Putney, Raphiael (I)	2.07 m (6 ft 9 in)	35 – 21 April 1990
PF	28	(Nigeria)	Ike, David (E)	2.13 m (7 ft 0 in)	18 – 16 July 2007
SG	45	(Nigeria)	Abah, Ogbodeje	2.07 m (6 ft 9 in)	19 – 12 December 2006

Head coach

- (Nigeria) Ogoh Odaudu

Assistant coach(es)

- (Nigeria) Abdulrahman Mohammed

Legend

- (C) Team captain
- (I) Import player
- (E): BAL Elevate player
- Injured

- Roster
Updated: April 4, 2025

== Transactions ==
=== Additions ===
Date	Player	Former team
March 13, 2025	Jackson Makoi	Cairns Taipans
March 13, 2025	Madut Akec	AS Douanes
March 23, 2025	Raphiael Putney	Pioneros de Los Mochis
March 26, 2025	Maxi Munanga Shamba	

=== Subtractions ===
Date	Player	New team
October 26, 2024	Devine Eke	(United States) Santa Cruz Warriors
February 26, 2025	Will Perry	ASC Ville de Dakar
	John Wilkins	Retired

== Games ==
=== BAL ===
==== Nile Conference ====
The Hoopers were placed in the Kalahari Conference, which began on 5 April 2025 and was held in Rabat, Morocco.

Pos	Team	Pld	W	L	PF	PA	PD	PCT	Qualification
1	(Egypt) Al Ittihad Alexandria	6	6	0	526	428	+98	1.000	Advance to playoffs
2	(Nigeria) Rivers Hoopers	6	4	2	484	466	+18	.667	Advance to playoffs
3	(Morocco) FUS Rabat (H)	6	2	4	456	475	−19	.333	Advance to playoffs
4	(Mali) Stade Malien	6	0	6	395	492	−97	.000	

Source: BAL
Rules for classification: Tiebreakers
(H) Hosts

5 April 2025	Stade Malien (Mali)	60–81	(Nigeria) Rivers Hoopers	Rabat, Morocco
16:00	Scoring by quarter: 23–16, 12–25, 12–21, 13–19
	Pts: Coulibaly 20; Rebs: Doumbya 11; Asts: Coulibaly 6	Boxscore	Pts: Amayo 19; Rebs: Olisemeka 12; Asts: Akec, Shamba 4	Arena: Salle Moulay Abdellah; Attendance: 3,329; Referees: Ian Mcclenny, Oumar Sy, Natascha Onono

6 April 2025	Rivers Hoopers (Nigeria)	88–82	(Morocco) FUS Rabat	Rabat, Morocco
19:00	Scoring by quarter: 23–17, 27–25, 15–25, 23–15
	Pts: Akec 25; Rebs: Olisemeka 14; Asts: Shamba 6	Boxscore	Pts: Zouzoua 21; Rebs: Jordan 9 Asts: Jordan 11	Arena: Salle Moulay Abdellah; Attendance: 4,372; Referees: Leah Lanie, Erik Aellig, Didier Gaga

8 April 2025	Rivers Hoopers (Nigeria)	80–100	(Egypt) Al Ittihad Alexandria	Rabat, Morocco
17:00	Scoring by quarter: 23–25, 19–27, 23–29, 15–19
	Pts: Akec 18; Rebs: Putney 6 Asts: Shamba 8	Boxscore	Pts: Vinales 26; Rebs: Mahmoud 7 Asts: Vinales 7	Arena: Salle Moulay Abdellah; Attendance: 1,015; Referees: Leah Lanie, Arnold Moseya, Didier Gaga

10 April 2025	FUS Rabat (Morocco)	71–79	(Nigeria) Rivers Hoopers	Rabat, Morocco
20:00	Scoring by quarter: 19–20, 17–11, 22–22, 13–26
	Pts: Fofana 14; Rebs: Diagne 9 Asts: Zouita 6	Boxscore	Pts: Akec 17; Rebs: Olisemeka 13; Asts: Amayo 7	Arena: Salle Moulay Abdellah; Attendance: 4,978; Referees: Erik Aellig, Oumar Sy, Dorothy Okatch

12 April 2025	Al Ittihad Alexandria (Egypt)	94–77	(Nigeria) Rivers Hoopers	Rabat, Morocco
16:00	Scoring by quarter: 19–19, 30–10, 26–27, 19–21
	Pts: Deng 18; Rebs: Mahmoud 10; Asts: Vinales 7	Boxscore	Pts: Akec 17; Rebs: Olisemeka 16; Asts: Amayo 8	Arena: Salle Moulay Abdellah; Referees: Ian Mcclenny, Yann Vezo Davidson, Natascha Onono

13 April 2025	Rivers Hoopers (Nigeria)	79–59	(Mali) Stade Malien	Rabat, Morocco
16:00	Scoring by quarter: 27–21, 27–10, 20–7, 15–21
	Pts: Putney 15; Rebs: Olisemeka 9 Asts: Olisemeka 6	Boxscore	Pts: Tounkara 14; Rebs: Doumbya 8 Asts: Sane 3	Arena: Salle Moulay Abdellah; Referees: Julian McFadden, Erick Otieno, Sarty Nghixulifwa

==== Playoffs ====
===== Seeding game =====
7 June 2025	US Monastir (Tunisia)	89–81	(Nigeria) Rivers Hoopers	Pretoria, South Africa
19:00	Scoring by quarter: 14–16, 18–20, 34–26, 23–19
	Pts: Sané 22; Rebs: Lahyani 7 Asts: Hardy 9	Boxscore	Pts: Putney 28; Rebs: Olisemeka 10; Asts: Maxi Munanga 4	Arena: SunBet Arena; Attendance: 5,052; Referees: Pat O'Connell, Jean Sauveur Ruhamiriza, Oumar Sy

===== Quarterfinals =====
9 June 2025	Rivers Hoopers (Nigeria)	73–104	(Rwanda) APR	Pretoria, South Africa
16:00	Scoring by quarter: 11–24, 21–33, 20–26, 21–21
	Pts: Akec 21; Rebs: Garba, Olisemeka 7 Asts: Akec 4	Boxscore	Pts: Omot 21; Rebs: Diarra 9 Asts: Randle 10	Arena: SunBet Arena; Attendance: 1,803; Referees: Pat O'Connell, Arnold Moseya, Amir Taboubi
