= 2025 BAL season =

5th season of the Basketball Africa League

- League: Basketball Africa League
- Season: 2025
- Dates: 5 April – 25 May 2025 (group phase); 6 – 14 June 2025 (playoffs)
- Number of games: 48
- Teams: 12

Playoffs
- Champions: (Libya) Al Ahli Tripoli (1st title)
- Runners-up: (Angola) Petro de Luanda
- Third place: (Rwanda) APR
- Fourth place: (Egypt) Al Ittihad Alexandria

Awards
- MVP: Jean Jacques Boissy (Al Ahli)

Seasons
- ← 2024 (Season 4) 2026 (Season 6) →

The 2025 BAL season, also known as BAL Season 5, was the 5th season of the Basketball Africa League (BAL). The season began on 5 April and ended on 14 June 2025 with the final. The playoffs and finals will be held in Pretoria, South Africa, for the first time.

Petro de Luanda were the defending champions, having won the previous season, but lost in the final to Al Ahli Tripoli, who became the first Libyan team to win the BAL championship. As winners, Al Ahli Tripoli earned the right to play in the 2025 FIBA Intercontinental Cup.

== Venues ==
The Moroccan Royal Basketball Federation (FRMBB) announced on 12 November 2024 that Rabat would be one of the host cities of the first phase of the 2025 season.

On 21 November 2024, the BAL announced that the group phase would be hosted in three countries, as the Nile Conference is hosted at the Salle Moulay Abdellah in Rabat, Morocco, the Sahara Conference in Dakar Arena, Dakar, Senegal, and the Kalahari Conference in the BK Arena in Kigali, Rwanda. The playoffs and final will be played in the SunBet Arena in Pretoria, South Africa.

== Qualification ==
The number of directly qualified teams changed from the previous four seasons, as the BAL now allocated eight direct slots to designated leagues and markets. As such, the champions of Morocco were given a direct spot in the tournament, while only four teams would qualify through the Road to BAL. FIBA Africa had reported that the champions of South Africa received direct qualification, and this was effectively honored when South African champions MBB were given a wild card spot.

== Teams ==
Location of teams of the 2025 BAL season .
Green: Nile Conference; Yellow: Sahara Conference; Red: Kalahari Conference.

The defending champions Petro de Luanda were the first team to qualify, as they won the 2023–24 Angolan Basketball League on 12 May 2024 to qualify for a record-extending fifth season in a row. Al Ittihad Alexandria will make its debut, becoming the third Egyptian club to play in the league and it is the greatest Egyptian basketball club in history. ASCVD became the third Senegalese club to qualify following their Nationale 1 title. MBB from South Africa was announced on 12 January 2025 as the last representative, after they were given a wild card.

The season had six debuting teams, setting a new record.

=== Method of qualification and statistics ===
Team	Method of qualification	Date of qualification	App.	Previous year	Cons.	Best performance	Ref.
(Angola) Petro de Luanda	2023–24 Angolan Basketball League champions	12 May 2024	5th	2024	5	Champions (2024)	
(Egypt) Al Ittihad Alexandria	2023–24 Egyptian Basketball Premier League champions	13 June 2024	1st	—N/a	1	—N/a	
(Tunisia) US Monastir	2023–24 Championnat Pro A champions	27 June 2024	5th	2024	5	Champions (2022)	
(Senegal) ASC Ville de Dakar	2024 Nationale 1 champions	27 June 2024	1st	—N/a	1	—N/a	
(Rwanda) APR	2024 RBL season champions	23 September 2024	2nd	2024	2	Group stage (2024)	
(Nigeria) Rivers Hoopers	2024 NBBF Premier League champions	19 November 2024	3rd	2024	2	Third Place (2024)	
(Morocco) FUS Rabat	2023–24 Division Excellence champions	10 July 2024	2nd	2024	2	Quarterfinalist (2024)	
(Libya) Al Ahli Tripoli	Road to BAL West Division winners	9 November 2024	1st	—N/a	1	—N/a	
(Mali) Stade Malien	Road to BAL West Division runners-up	9 November 2024	2nd	2023	2	Third Place (2023)	
(Cape Verde) Kriol Star	Road to BAL East Division finalist	2 December 2024	1st	—N/a	1	—N/a	
(Kenya) Nairobi City Thunder	Road to BAL East Division finalist	2 December 2024	1st	—N/a	1	—N/a	
(South Africa) MBB	Wild card	12 January 2025	1st	—N/a	1	—N/a	

=== Personnel ===
Team	Head coach	Captain
Al Ahli Tripoli	(Lebanon) Fouad Abou Chakra	(Libya) Mohamed Sadi
Al Ittihad Alexandria	(Egypt) Ahmed Omar	(Egypt) Ahmed El Sabbagh
ASC Ville de Dakar	(Senegal) Libasse Faye	(Senegal) Bara Ndiaye
APR	(United States) James Maye	(Rwanda) William Robeyns
FUS Rabat	(Morocco) Said El Bouzidi	(Morocco) Abdelhakim Zouita
Kriol Star	(Portugal) Hugo Salgado	(Cape Verde) Joel Almeida
MBB	(United States) Sam Vincent	(South Africa) Lebesa Selepe
Nairobi City Thunder	(United States) Brad Ibs	(Kenya) Tylor Ongwae
Petro de Luanda	(Spain) Sergio Valdeolmillos	(Angola) Childe Dundão
Rivers Hoopers	(Nigeria) Ogoh Odaudu	(Nigeria) Onyebuchi Nwaiwu
Stade Malien	(Mali) Boubacar Kanouté	(Mali) Mahamane Coulibaly
US Monastir	(Portugal) Vasco Curado	(Tunisia) Radhouane Slimane

== Pre-season ==
As the champions of the 2024 BAL season, Petro de Luanda played in the 2024 FIBA Intercontinental Cup in September 2024. They finished in fifth place.

== Schedule ==
The full schedule for the season was officially released on 21 November 2024.

Phase	Round	Games
Qualifying rounds (Road to BAL)	First Round	8 October – 1 November 2024
Qualifying rounds (Road to BAL)	Elite 16	5 November – 3 December 2024
Group phase	Nile Conference	5 – 13 April 2025
Group phase	Sahara Conference	26 April – 5 May 2025
Group phase	Kalahari Conference	17 – 25 May 2025
Seeding games		6 –14 June 2025
Playoffs	Quarter-finals	6 –14 June 2025
Playoffs	Semi-finals	6 –14 June 2025
Playoffs	Final and third place	6 –14 June 2025

== Group phase ==
The group phase is played between 5 April and 25 May 2024. The twelve teams of the group phase are allocated into three conferences. The BAL announced the official schedule on 28 February 2025.

=== Tiebreakers ===
The ranking of teams in the regular season was determined as follows:

1. Win-loss record;
2. Head-to-head record;
3. Point differential in the games between the respective teams;
4. Number of points scored in the games between the respective teams;
5. Average point differential in all games against other teams in the Conference;
6. Average number of points scored in all games played against other teams in the Conference;
7. Drawing.

=== Kalahari Conference ===
Pos	Team	Pld	W	L	PF	PA	PD	PCT	Qualification	AIA	RIV	FUS	SMB
1	(Egypt) Al Ittihad Alexandria	6	6	0	526	428	+98	1.000	Advance to playoffs	—	94–77	98–74	91–68
2	(Nigeria) Rivers Hoopers	6	4	2	484	466	+18	.667	Advance to playoffs	80–100	—	88–82	79–59
3	(Morocco) FUS Rabat (H)	6	2	4	456	475	−19	.333	Advance to playoffs	60–71	71–79	—	92–72
4	(Mali) Stade Malien	6	0	6	395	492	−97	.000		69–72	60–81	67–77	—

Source: BAL
Legend: Blue = home team win; Red = away team win.
Rules for classification: Tiebreakers
(H) Hosts

=== Sahara Conference ===
Pos	Team	Pld	W	L	PF	PA	PD	PCT	Qualification	USM	APL	KRS	AVD
1	(Tunisia) US Monastir	6	4	2	478	444	+34	.667	Advance to playoffs	—	87–73	88–72	77–68
2	(Angola) Petro de Luanda	6	3	3	463	432	+31	.500 (Note: Head-to-head: Petro de Luanda 1–1 Kriol Star, +26 point differential.)	Advance to playoffs	78–68	—	69–71	76–67
3	(Cape Verde) Kriol Star	6	3	3	461	506	−45	.500	Advance to playoffs	83–91	74–103	—	66–63
4	(Senegal) ASC Ville de Dakar (H)	6	2	4	425	445	−20	.333		70–67	65–64	92–95	—

Source: BAL
Legend: Blue = home team win; Red = away team win.
Rules for classification: Tiebreakers
(H) Hosts

=== Nile Conference ===
Pos	Team	Pld	W	L	PF	PA	PD	PCT	Qualification	AHT	APR	MBB	NCT
1	(Libya) Al Ahli Tripoli	6	6	0	604	498	+106	1.000	Advance to playoffs	—	106–102	102–73	104–91
2	(Rwanda) APR (H)	6	3	3	530	508	+22	.500	Advance to playoffs	68–90	—	88–94	92–63
3	(South Africa) MBB	6	2	4	476	539	−63	.333		73–102	81–103	—	76–85
4	(Kenya) Nairobi City Thunder	6	1	5	474	539	−65	.167		87–115	74–77	74–75	—

Source: BAL
Legend: Blue = home team win; Red = away team win.
Rules for classification: Tiebreakers
(H) Hosts

=== Ranking of third-placed teams ===
Pos	Grp	Team	Pld	W	L	PF	PA	PD	PCT	Qualification
1	Sahara	(Cape Verde) Kriol Star	6	3	3	461	506	−45	.500	Advance to playoffs
2	Kalahari	(Morocco) FUS Rabat	6	2	4	456	475	−19	.333	Advance to playoffs
3	Nile	(South Africa) MBB	6	2	4	476	539	−63	.333	

Source: BAL

== Playoffs ==
=== Rankings ===
Pos	Team	Pld	W	L	GF	GA	GD	PCT	Qualification
1	(Libya) Al Ahli Tripoli	6	6	0	604	498	+106	1.000	Qualification to 1st-2nd seed game
2	(Egypt) Al Ittihad Alexandria	6	6	0	526	428	+98	1.000	Qualification to 1st-2nd seed game
3	(Tunisia) US Monastir	6	4	2	478	444	+34	.667	Qualification to 3rd-4th seed game
4	(Nigeria) Rivers Hoopers	6	4	2	484	466	+18	.667	Qualification to 3rd-4th seed game
5	(Angola) Petro de Luanda	6	3	3	463	432	+31	.500	Qualification to 5th-6th seed game
6	(Rwanda) APR	6	3	3	530	508	+22	.500	Qualification to 5th-6th seed game
7	(Cape Verde) Kriol Star	6	3	3	461	506	−45	.500	Qualification to 7th-8th seed game
8	(Morocco) FUS Rabat	6	2	4	456	475	−19	.333	Qualification to 7th-8th seed game

Source: BAL
Rules for classification: Teams ranked on 1) Win-loss record; 2) Head-to-head record; 3) Point differential in the games between the respective teams; 4) Number of points scored in the games between the respective teams; 5) Average point differential in all games against other teams in the Conference; 6) Average number of points scored in all games played against other teams in the Conference; 7) Drawing.

=== Seeding games ===
The seeding games between the eight teams that advanced from the group phase were played on 8 and 9 June 2025. The match-ups were determined based on an aggregate ranking of all teams, with four pairings to decide the final seeds. The numbers in brackets are the seeds of the teams.

Team 1	Score	Team 2
(1) Al Ahli Tripoli (Libya)	74–85	(Egypt) Al Ittihad Alexandria (2)
(3) US Monastir (Tunisia)	89–81	(Nigeria) Rivers Hoopers (4)
(5) Petro de Luanda (Angola)	57–75	(Rwanda) APR (6)
(7) Kriol Star (Cape Verde)	91–88	(Morocco) FUS Rabat (8)

=== Bracket ===
Quarterfinals
1	(Egypt) Al Ittihad Alexandria (OT)	86
8	(Morocco) FUS Rabat	83
3	(Tunisia) US Monastir	84
6	(Angola) Petro de Luanda	95
2	(Libya) Al Ahli Tripoli	107
7	(Cape Verde) Kriol Star	81
4	(Nigeria) Rivers Hoopers	73
5	(Rwanda) APR	104

Semifinals
1	(Egypt) Al Ittihad Alexandria	74
6	(Angola) Petro de Luanda	96
2	(Libya) Al Ahli Tripoli	84
5	(Rwanda) APR	71

Final
6	(Angola) Petro de Luanda	67
2	(Libya) Al Ahli Tripoli	88
Third place game
1	(Egypt) Al Ittihad Alexandria	90
5	(Rwanda) APR	123

== Individual awards ==
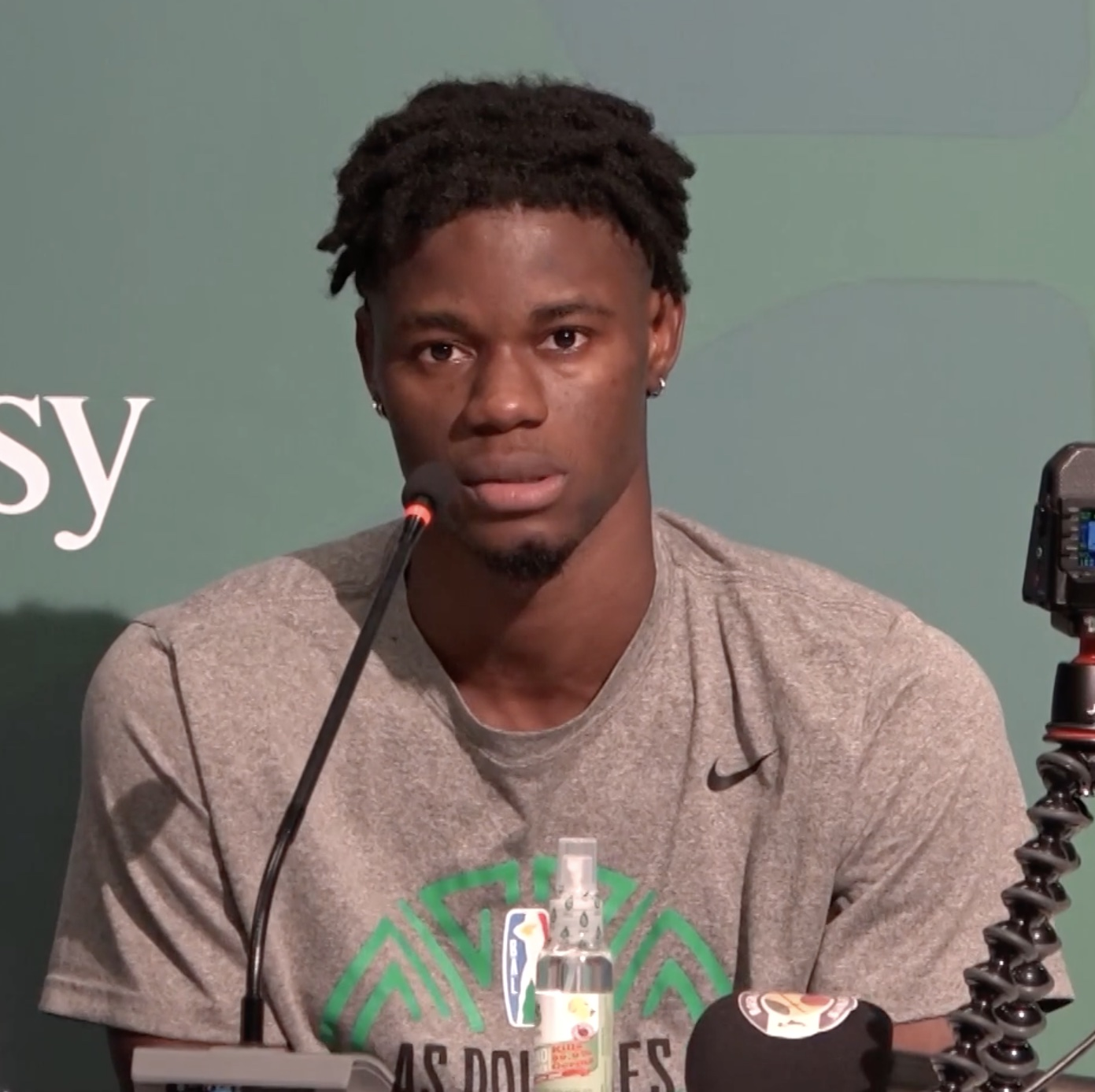
Jean Jacques Boissy won his first MVP award

The Coach of the Year award was announced on 14 June 2025, while the other awards were announced on 15 June 2025, before or after the final. For the first time in league history, fans were allowed to vote for the winner of the MVP and the Defensive Player of the Year awards, having the option of picking between four finalists. The fan vote made up for 25% of the points, with the other 75% coming from the MVP panel.

- MVP: Jean Jacques Boissy, Al Ahli Tripoli
  - Finalists: Jaylen Adams (Al Ahli Tripoli), Patrick Gardner, Aboubakar Gakou (Petro de Luanda)
- Defensive Player of the Year: Aliou Diarra, APR
  - Finalists: Anas Mahmoud (Al Ittihad Alexandria), Jean Jacques Boissy (Al Ahli Tripoli) and Childe Dundão (Petro de Luanda)
- Coach of the Year: Fouad Abou Chakra, Al Ahli Tripoli
- Sportsmanship Award: Solo Diabate, Petro de Luanda

- All-BAL First Team
  - G Jaylen Adams, Al Ahli Tripoli
  - G Jean Jacques Boissy, Al Ahli Tripoli
  - F Majok Deng, Al Ittihad Alexandria
  - F Patrick Gardner, Petro de Luanda
  - C Aliou Diarra, APR
- All-BAL Second Team
  - Mohamed Sadi, Al Ahli Tripoli
  - Babacar Sané, US Monastir
  - Ivan Almeida, Kriol Star
  - Taefale Lenard, MBB
  - Youssou Ndoye, APR

- BAL All-Defensive First Team
  - G Obadiah Noel, APR
  - G Jean Jacques Boissy, Al Ahli Tripoli
  - F Teafale Lenard, MBB
  - F Caleb Agada, Al Ahli Tripoli
  - C Aliou Diarra, APR
- BAL All-Defensive Second Team
  - G Childe Dundão, Petro de Luanda
  - G Mohamed Sadi, Al Ahli Tripoli
  - F Ivan Almeida, Kriol Star
  - F Majok Deng, Al Ahli Tripoli
  - C Youssoupha Ndoye, APR

== Statistics ==
=== Individual statistic leaders ===
Category	Player	Team(s)	Statistic
Points per game	Teafale Lenard	MBB	22.7
Rebounds per game	Assem Marei	Al Ahli Tripoli	12.4
Assists per game	Cameron Parker	Kriol Star	7.8
Steals per game	Teafale Lenard	MBB	3.5
Blocks per game	Aliou Diarra	APR	3.4
Minutes per game	Ivan Almeida	Kriol Star	37.5
FG%	Aliou Diarra	APR	55.7%
3P%	Madut Akec	Rivers Hoopers	48.8%
FT%	Pieter Prinsloo	MBB	100%

=== Individual game highs ===
Category	Player	Team	Statistic
Points	Teafale Lenard	MBB	39
Rebounds	Assem Marei	Al Ahli Tripoli	19
Assists	Childe Dundão	Petro de Luanda	11
Assists	John Jordan	FUS Rabat	11
Steals	Madut Akec	Rivers Hoopers	6
Blocks	Aliou Diarra	APR	8 (record)
Three pointers	Axel Mpoyo	APR	10 (record)

=== Team statistic leaders ===
Category	Team	Statistic
Points per game	Al Ahli Tripoli	95.7
Rebounds per game	ASC Ville de Dakar	46.0
Assists per game	APR	22.7
Steals per game	Al Ahli Tripoli	11.5
Blocks per game	MBB	4.7
Turnovers per game	MBB	17.2
Fouls per game	MBB	20.2
FG%	APR	48.0%
FT%	Kriol Star	76.1%
3P%	FUS Rabat	37.9%
