= Teafale Lenard =

American basketball player (born 2002)

Taefale Lenard
No. 6 – RSSB Tigers
- Position: Small forward / power forward
- League: BAL

Personal information
- Born: July 21, 2002 (age 24) Snyder, Texas
- Listed height: 6 ft 7 in (2.01 m)
- Listed weight: 175 lb (79 kg)

Career information
- High school: Snyder High School (Snyder, Texas); Link Academy (Branson, Missouri)
- College: Middle Tennessee (2021–2023); Memphis (2023–2024)
- NBA draft: 2024: undrafted
- Playing career: 2024–present

Career history
- 2024–2025: Texas Legends
- 2025: MBB
- 2026: APR
- 2026–present: RSSB Tigers

Career highlights
- BAL champion (2026); All-BAL Second Team (2025); BAL All-Defensive Second Team (2025); BAL steals leader (2025); BAL scoring champion (2025)

Teafale Marquise Lenard Jr. (born July 21, 2002) is an American professional basketball player who plays for APR of the Basketball Africa League (BAL).

== High school and college career ==
After attending Snyder High School in Texas, Lenard played his prep career at Link Academy in Branson, Missouri and initially committed to American Athletic Conference (ACA) member Tulsa, before signing with Middle Tennessee Blue Raiders in 2021. He averaged 8.3 points, 4.0 rebounds and 1.7 assists as a sophomore for the Blue Raiders in 2022–23. He also tied his own program record with 50 dunks and was named to the Conference USA All-Defensive team and Honorable Mention All-C-USA. Lenard transferred to the Memphis Tigers ahead of the 2023–24 season.

== Professional career ==
Teafale made his professional debut with the Texas Legends in the NBA G League, where he joined for the 2023–24 season. He averaged 10.2 points and 3.9 rebounds in his two seasons with the Legends.

Lenard joined South African team MBB for the 2025 season of the Basketball Africa League (BAL). On May 20, 2025, he scored a career-high 39 points for MBB in a loss against Al Ahli. He led the league in scoring with 22.7 points per game, as well as in steals with 3.5 per game. He also averaged 7.3 rebounds and 2.7 blocks per game. On June 14, Lenard was named to the All-BAL Second Team; he was named to the All-Defensive First Team earlier too.

In February 2026, Lenard joined the Rwandan team APR ahead of the 2026 BAL season. He played with the team in the Rwanda Basketball League as well, but when APR withdrew from the BAL, he joined their replacements RSSB Tigers.

== Personal ==
Lenard is the son of Ashley Lenard and Teafale Lenard, Sr., and has two brothers. His favorite athlete is Kobe Bryant.

== Career statistics ==
Legend
GP	Games played	GS	Games started	MPG	Minutes per game
FG%	Field goal percentage	3P%	3-point field goal percentage	FT%	Free throw percentage
RPG	Rebounds per game	APG	Assists per game	SPG	Steals per game
BPG	Blocks per game	PPG	Points per game	**Bold**	Career high
*	Led the league

=== BAL ===
Year	Team	GP	GS	MPG	FG%	3P%	FT%	RPG	APG	SPG	BPG	PPG
2025	MBB	6	6	35.7	.438	.308	.755	7.3	3.0	3.3*	2.7	22.7*
