= Richaud Pack =

American basketball player

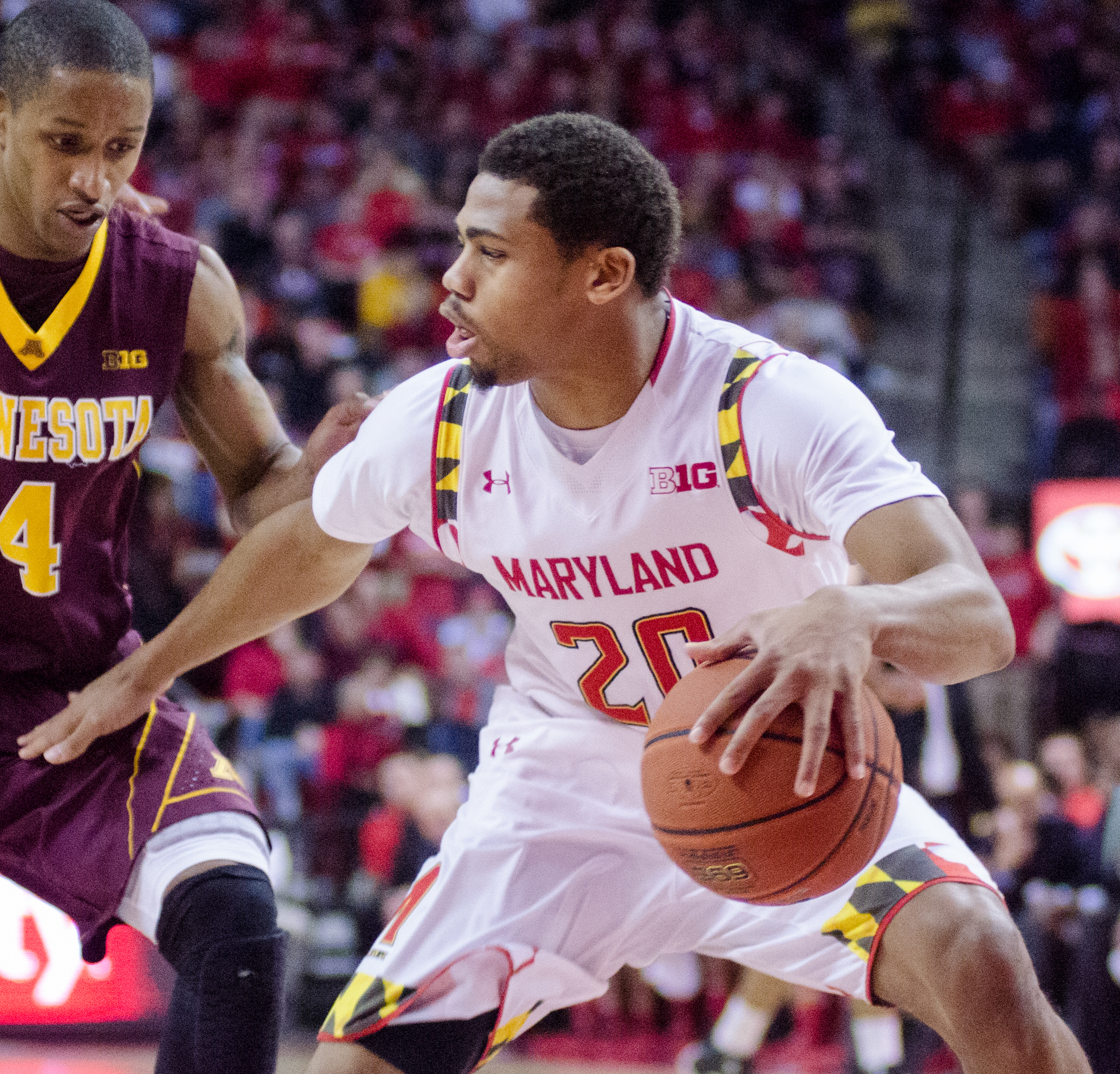
- Pack with the Maryland Terrapins in 2015

No. 2 – Namuwongo Blazers
- Position: Shooting guard
- League: National Basketball League (Uganda)

Personal information
- Born: October 17, 1992 (age 34) Birmingham, Michigan, U.S.
- Listed height: 6 ft 4 in (1.93 m)
- Listed weight: 192 lb (87 kg)

Career information
- High school: Seaholm (Birmingham, Michigan)
- College: FIU (2010–2012); North Carolina A&T (2013–2014); Maryland (2014–2015)
- NBA draft: 2015: undrafted
- Playing career: 2015–present

Career history
- 2015–2016: ETHA Engomis
- 2017–2018: Arnetx Zornotza
- 2018–2019: CB Menorca
- 2019–2020: Korihait
- 2020–2021: BC Vienna
- 2021–2022: Hapoel Afula
- 2022: Hapoel HaEmek
- 2022: Hapoel Be'er Sheva
- 2022–2023: Aris Thessaloniki
- 2023–2024: Kataja
- 2024–2025: Hapoel Kfar Saba
- 2025: Kriol Star
- 2025: Otef Darom BC
- 2026: Indios de Juárez
- 2026: Beirut Club
- 2026-present: Namuwongo Blazers

Career highlights
- Most points in a game ever Austria Bundesliga (55); Finland Korisliiga most point in an away playoff game (47) this century; Korisliiga All-Imports First team (2024); Liga Leumit Israel Scoring leader (2022); Liga Leumit Israel Scoring leader (2025); All-LEB Plata Second Team (2019); All-Cypriot League Third Team (2016); Austrian Basketball Bundesliga Leading scorer (2020)

Richaud Jeron-Felix Pack (born October 17, 1992) is an American–Sierra Leonean professional basketball player for Namuwongo Blazers. He played college basketball for the FIU Panthers, North Carolina A&T Aggies, and the Maryland Terrapins.

== College career ==
As a redshirt junior at North Carolina A&T, Pack averaged 17.0 points and 4.6 rebounds per game. Following the season, he transferred to Maryland as a graduate transfer. As a senior, Pack averaged 5.8 points, 3.3 rebounds and 1.2 assists per game.

== Professional career ==
=== ETHA Engomis (2015–2016) ===
In September 2015, Pack signed a deal with the Cypriot basketball team Michelin ETHA Engomis. In his first professional game, he recorded 15 points to go along with 5 rebounds in a losing effort to APOEL. Pack participated in the first year of the FIBA Europe Cup competitions and shot 40% from 3 point range and 90% from the free throw line.

=== Arnetx Zornotza (2017–2018) ===
During the 2017-18 season Pack played for Arnetx Zornotza of the LEB Silver and averaged 20.4 points, 2.8 rebounds, and 2.3 assists per game.

=== BC Vienna (2020–2021) ===
On September 22, 2020, the Austrian basketball team BC Vienna signed Pack. On December 28, 2020, Pack scored a career-high 55 points in a 104-101 OT win over Arkadia Lions. His 55 points set a new single-game record for most points scored in a single game in Austrian Basketball Superliga history. After scoring his career-high, he scored 38 points in a 96-89 win over the Kapfenberg Bulls.

=== Hapoel Afula (2021–2022) ===
On August 10, 2021, Pack signed with Hapoel Afula of the Israeli National League. He averaged 22.3 points, 3.7 rebounds, 2.7 assists, and 1.3 steals per game.

=== Hapoel Migdal HaEmek (2022) ===
On February 22, 2022, Pack signed with Hapoel Migdal HaEmek of the Israeli National League. He led the national league in scoring with 24.4 points per game. The following season, he signed with Hapoel Beer Sheva/Dimona in the Israeli Winner league. He appeared in one game scoring 8 points and 6 rebounds in 10 minutes of play.

=== Hapoel Be'er Sheva (2022) ===
On September 20, 2022, he signed with Hapoel Be'er Sheva of the Israeli Basketball Premier League.

=== Aris Thessaloniki (2022–2023) ===
On November 7, 2022, Pack moved to Greek club Aris, where he appeared in only two league matches due to injury before leaving the team due to financial reasons. Pack filed a BAT suit against Aris with FIBA in May 2023.

=== Hapoel Kfar Saba (2024-2025) ===
Pack recorded a triple-double on November 22, 2024 with 19 points, 12 assist, and 11 rebounds. Before his last game with Hapoel Kfar Saba, Pack was leading the league in efficiency and scoring with statistics of 25 points, 6.7 assist, and 6 rebounds per game. As of March 25, 2025, Pack was on pace to win the fourth scoring title of his career and his second scoring title in Europe. It is also notable, that Pack was drawing nearly 10 fouls per game versus opponents.

== Career statistics ==
Legend
| GP | Games played | MPG | Minutes per game | FG% | Field goal percentage |
| 3P% | 3-point field goal percentage | FT% | Free throw percentage | RPG | Rebounds per game |
| APG | Assists per game | SPG | Steals per game | BPG | Blocks per game |
| PPG | Points per game | **Bold** | Career high | | Led the league |

| Year | Team | League | GP | MPG | FG% | 3P% | FT% | RPG | APG | SPG | BPG | PPG |
|---|---|---|---|---|---|---|---|---|---|---|---|---|
| 2015–16 | Michelin ETHA Engomis | Cypriot League | 21 | **34.3** | .461 | .373 | .849 | 2.7 | 1.1 | 1.1 | .1 | 16.8 |
| 2015–16 | Michelin ETHA Engomis | EuroCup | 6 | 33.0 | .377 | .400 | **.909** | 2.0 | 1.0 | .8 | .0 | 11.3 |
| 2017–18 | Ametx Zornotza | LEB Plata | **33** | 29.0 | .483 | .347 | .789 | 2.8 | 2.3 | 1.2 | **.2** | 20.4 |
| 2018–19 | Menorca Bàsquet | LEB Plata | **33** | 26.7 | .502 | .317 | .672 | 3.2 | 1.6 | .9 | **.2** | 13.6 |
| 2019–20 | UU Korihait | Korisliiga | 18 | 30.5 | **.515** | .367 | .902 | 2.5 | 1.7 | 1.1 | .1 | 17.9 |
| 2020–21 | BC Hallman Vienna | Austrian League | 22 | 34.0 | .453 | .388 | .858 | 3.4 | **5.3** | .9 | .0 | **23.8** |
| 2021–22 | Hapoel Afula | Israeli National League | 3 | 32.0 | .409 | .385 | .839 | **3.7** | 2.7 | **1.3** | .0 | 22.3 |
| Career | | All Leagues | 136 | 30.5 | .476 | .361 | .808 | 2.9 | 2.3 | 1.0 | .1 | 18.0 |
