= Obadiah Noel =

American basketball player

Free agent
- Position: Shooting guard

Personal information
- Born: June 28, 1999 (age 27) Frederick, Maryland, U.S.
- Listed height: 6 ft 4 in (1.93 m)
- Listed weight: 185 lb (84 kg)

Career information
- High school: Saint John's Catholic Prep (Buckeystown, Maryland); Tuscarora (Frederick, Maryland)
- College: UMass Lowell (2017–2021)
- NBA draft: 2021: undrafted
- Playing career: 2021–present

Career history
- 2021–2022: Raptors 905
- 2022–2024: Westchester Knicks
- 2024: APR
- 2024–2025: Indiana Mad Ants
- 2025: APR
- 2025: Westchester Knicks

Career highlights
- All-BAL Defensive First Team (2025); NBA G League Showcase Cup champion (2023); 2x First-team All-America East (2020, 2021); America East All-Rookie Team (2018)
- Stats at NBA.com
- Stats at Basketball Reference

Obadiah Arthur Noel (born June 28, 1999) is an American-Guyanese professional basketball player, who most recently played for the Westchester Knicks of the NBA G League. He played college basketball for the UMass Lowell River Hawks.

== Early life ==
Noel began his high school career at Saint John's Catholic Prep. For his senior season, Noel transferred to Tuscarora High School, playing under coach Darryl Whiten. He scored 41 points in a game during his senior season. As a senior, Noel averaged 22.4 points, 5.2 rebounds and 3.5 assists per game. He was named Frederick County Player of the Year. Noel committed to playing college basketball at UMass Lowell, the only team to offer him a scholarship.

== College career ==
Noel averaged 6.5 points per game as a freshman off the bench. He was named to the America East All-Rookie Team. As a sophomore, Noel averaged 14.6 points, 3.5 rebounds, and 2 assists per game. Noel averaged 18.2 points, 5.2 rebounds and 2.7 assists per game as a junior, earning First Team All-America East honors. He declared for the 2020 NBA draft but ultimately withdrew and returned to UMass Lowell. On November 28, 2020, Noel scored a career-high 35 points in an 82–72 loss to Illinois State. He missed the final five games of the regular season with an undisclosed injury, but returned for the America East tournament. As a senior, Noel averaged 21.4 points, 4.8 rebounds and 3.3 assists per game. He was named to the First Team All-America East. Noel became the second River Hawk to surpass 1,500 points during the Division 1 era. Following the season, he declared for the 2021 NBA draft, forgoing the additional season of eligibility granted by the NCAA due to the COVID-19 pandemic.

== Professional career ==
Noel attended the Tampa Bay Pro Combine in preparation for the 2021 NBA draft. He was named to the All-Combine team after averaging 14 points, 2.8 rebounds and 2.3 assists per game.

=== Raptors 905 (2021–2022) ===
After going undrafted in the 2021 NBA draft, Noel joined Raptors 905 in November 2021 after a successful tryout. On January 6, 2022, he scored a career-high 28 points in a 103–94 win against the Fort Wayne Mad Ants. On December 12, 2022, Noel was waived.

=== Westchester Knicks (2022–2024) ===
On December 14, 2022, Noel signed a contract to join the Westchester Knicks.

On August 3, 2023, Noel signed with the New York Knicks. However, he was waived on September 6 and on November 9, he was named to the Westchester Knicks opening night roster.

=== APR (2024) ===
On April 19, 2024, Noel signed with APR of the Rwanda Basketball League and the Basketball Africa League. Noel made his debut in the semi-final of the Genocide Memorial Tournament and scored 26 points, 7 rebounds and 3 assists against REG.

=== Indiana Mad Ants (2024–2025) ===
On November 18, 2024, Noel was acquired by the Indiana Mad Ants.

=== Return to APR (2025–present) ===
On May 11, 2025, Noel returned to APR for a second stint in Rwanda, approximately one week ahead of the start of the 2025 BAL season. He helped the Lions finish in third place, the best results by a Rwandan team in league history. Noel averaged 13.9 points and 3.2 assists per game, was named to the BAL All-Defensive First Team after the season ended.

== Honours ==
APR

- Basketball Africa League third place: 2025
- BAL All-Defensive First Team: 2025

Westchester Knicks

- NBA G League Winter Showcase: 2023

== Career statistics ==
Legend
| GP | Games played | GS | Games started | MPG | Minutes per game |
| FG% | Field goal percentage | 3P% | 3-point field goal percentage | FT% | Free throw percentage |
| RPG | Rebounds per game | APG | Assists per game | SPG | Steals per game |
| BPG | Blocks per game | PPG | Points per game | **Bold** | Career high |

=== College ===
| Year | Team | GP | GS | MPG | FG% | 3P% | FT% | RPG | APG | SPG | BPG | PPG |
|---|---|---|---|---|---|---|---|---|---|---|---|---|
| 2017–18 | UMass Lowell | 30 | 0 | 18.4 | .400 | .375 | .681 | 2.5 | 1.1 | .6 | **.4** | 6.5 |
| 2018–19 | UMass Lowell | 31 | 30 | 28.8 | **.518** | .321 | .727 | 3.5 | 2.0 | 1.3 | **.4** | 14.6 |
| 2019–20 | UMass Lowell | **32** | **32** | **35.1** | .486 | **.400** | .674 | **5.2** | 2.7 | **1.7** | **.4** | 18.2 |
| 2020–21 | UMass Lowell | 18 | 18 | 34.1 | .486 | .326 | **.753** | 4.8 | **3.3** | 1.2 | .2 | **21.4** |
| Career | | 111 | 80 | 28.7 | .484 | .358 | .708 | 3.9 | 2.2 | 1.2 | .3 | 14.6 |
