= Landing Sané =

French basketball player

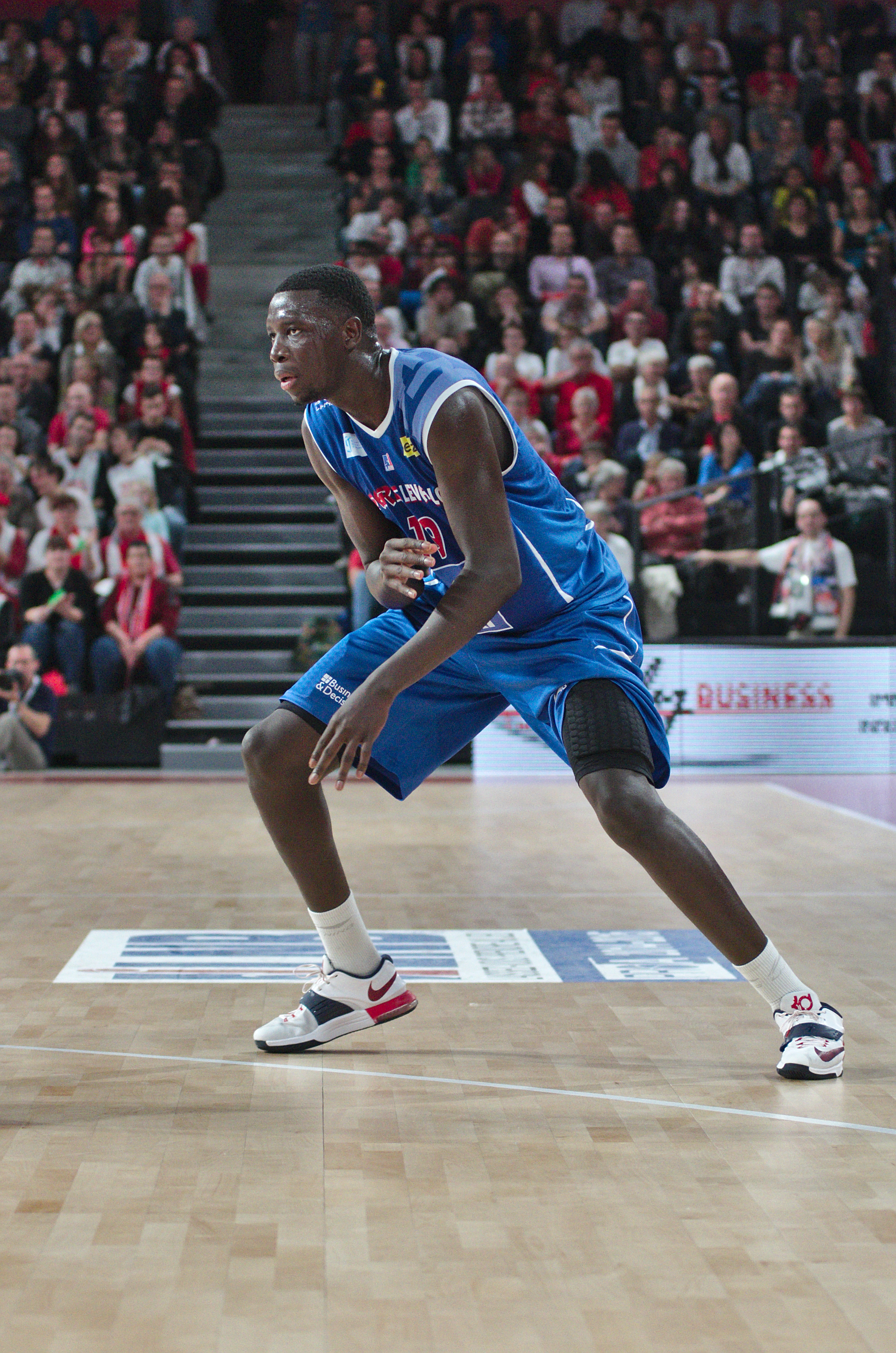
- Sané with Paris-Levallois in 2014

No. 41 – Stade Malien
- Position: Center
- League: Pro B

Personal information
- Born: 19 December 1990 (age 35) Ermont, Val-d'Oise
- Listed height: 2.07 m (6 ft 9 in)
- Listed weight: 100 kg (220 lb)

Career information
- NBA draft: 2012: undrafted
- Playing career: 2009–present

Career history
- 2009–2017: Paris-Levallois
- 2012–2013: →Hyères-Toulon
- 2017: Pallacanestro Reggiana
- 2018: Andorra
- 2018–2019: Mornar Bar
- 2019: Andorra
- 2019–2020: AS Monaco
- 2020–2021: Orléans Loiret Basket
- 2022–2024: Élan Béarnais Pau-Orthez
- 2024–2025: Fos-sur-mer
- 2025–present: Stade Malien

Career highlights
- French Cup winner (2022)

Landing Sané (born 19 December 1990) is a French-Senegalsese professional basketball player for Stade Malien for the Basketball Africa League (BAL).

== Professional career ==
On 29 September 2017, Sané signed a three-month contract with Pallacanestro Reggiana. On 3 January 2018, he parted ways with Reggiana after averaging 5.4 points and 3.6 rebounds in eight LBA games. The same day, he signed a two-month contract with MoraBanc Andorra.

On 8 August 2019, he signed with Monaco of the LNB Pro A.

On 1 June 2020, he signed with Orléans Loiret Basket of the French Pro A.

On 11 January 2022, he signed with Élan Béarnais Pau-Orthez for the French Pro A. On 31 August 2022, he extended his contract for two more years.

In April 2025, Sané was on the roster of Malian club Stade Malien for the 2025 BAL season.

== National team career ==
With the junior national teams of France, Sané played at the 2008 FIBA Europe Under-18 Championship and the 2009 FIBA Under-19 World Championship.

== Personal life ==
Sané was born in France and is of Senegalese descent.
