= Cartier Diarra =

American-Malian basketball player (born 1998)

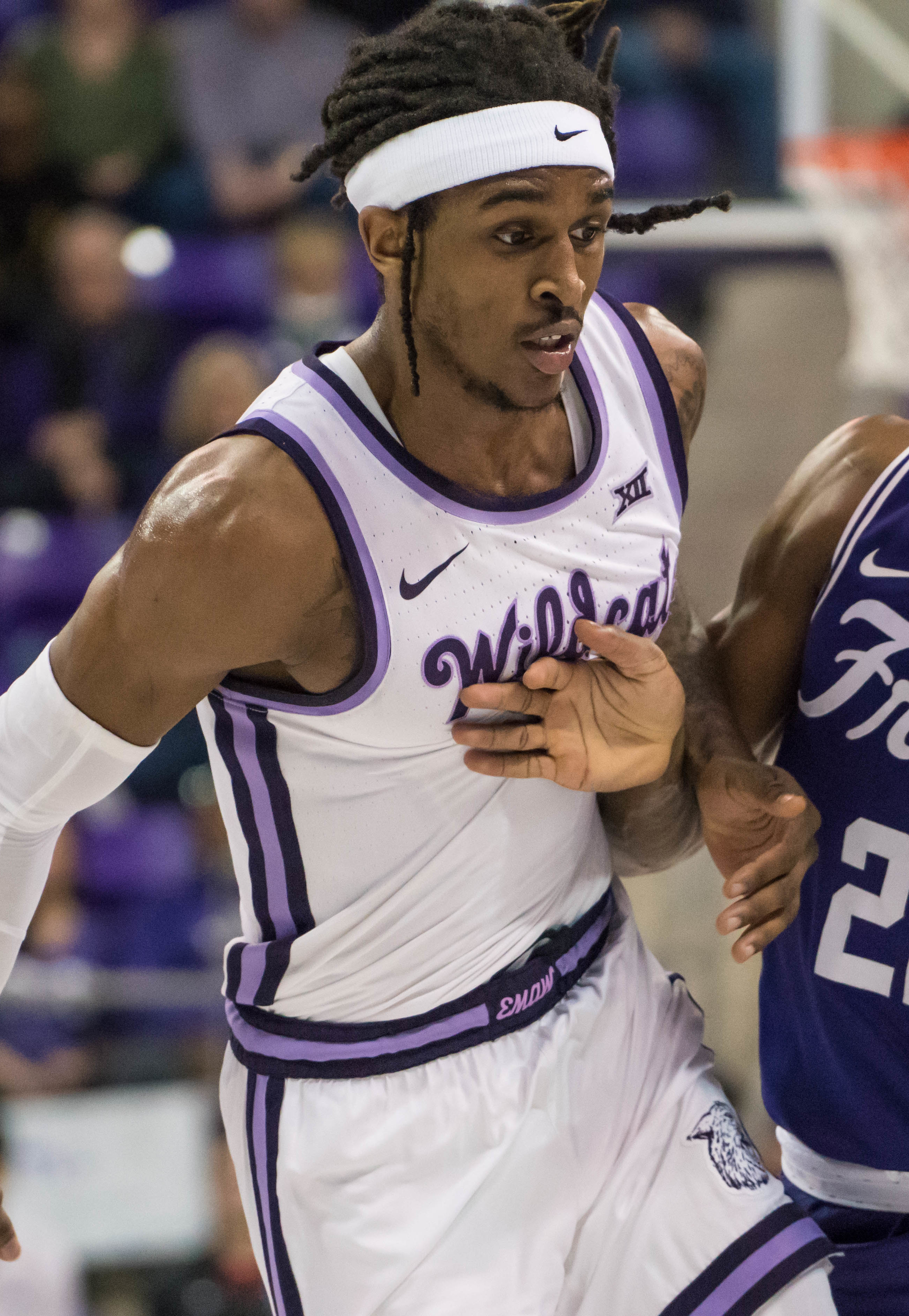
- Diarra with Kansas State in 2020

No. 10 – Stade Malien
- Position: Shooting guard
- League: Road to BAL

Personal information
- Born: February 6, 1998 (age 28) Manhattan, New York, U.S.
- Listed height: 6 ft 4 in (1.93 m)
- Listed weight: 185 lb (84 kg)

Career information
- High school: Cardinal Hayes (The Bronx, New York); West Florence (Florence, South Carolina)
- College: Kansas State (2017–2020); Virginia Tech (2020)
- NBA draft: 2021: undrafted

Career history
- 2021–2022: AB Contern
- 2023–2024: Cape Town Tigers
- 2024–present: Stade Malien

Cartier Ducati Diarra (born February 6, 1998) is an American-Malian basketball player who last played for Stade Malien. He played college basketball for the Kansas State Wildcats and the Virginia Tech Hokies.

== Early life and high school career ==
Diarra grew up in Harlem, New York, and broke his foot at the age of two. His father is from Mali. He was mainly raised by his mother, Danyelle Lee, alongside siblings Abraham, Cyncere and LadiRoyale, and rarely spoke to his father. Diarra grew up taking dancing lessons at Uptown Dance Academy. As a freshman, Diarra played basketball for Cardinal Hayes High School in The Bronx, New York. After one year, he transferred to West Florence High School in Florence, South Carolina, where he began living with his aunt, Lillian Shabazz.

Diarra joined West Florence's varsity basketball team despite not having much organized basketball experience. As a sophomore, he averaged seven points and 3.7 rebounds per game. Former National Basketball Association player Sharone Wright, whose son befriended Diarra, became his mentor and father figure. As a junior, Diarra averaged 12.9 points, 7.6 rebounds, 4.8 assists and 2.2 steals per game. In his senior season, he averaged 18.8 points, 11 rebounds, 7.2 assists, 3.6 steals and 2.1 blocks per game, registering eight triple-doubles. Diarra was named The Morning News Player of the Year.

== College career ==
=== Kansas State ===
Diarra redshirted his first season at Kansas State after suffering a torn anterior cruciate ligament, but recovered quickly and was able to practice with the team and add strength. On November 10, 2017, he made his college debut, recording 13 points and four assists, shooting 4-of-4 from three-point range, in an 83–45 win over American. Diarra initially came off the bench but began making an immediate impact as soon as he was placed in a starting role, after Kamau Stokes broke his left foot against Texas Tech on January 6, 2018. On January 13, he scored a freshman season-high 18 points, including 16 in the second half, in a 73–72 loss to 12th-ranked Kansas. As a freshman, Diarra averaged 7.1 points, 2.5 rebounds and two assists per game. He shot 40.5 percent from three-point range, the third-most by a freshman in program history.

Diarra missed eight games of his sophomore season with a broken finger. On March 15, 2019, at the 2019 Big 12 tournament semifinals, he scored a season-high 15 points and grabbed seven rebounds in a 63–59 loss to Iowa State. As a sophomore, Diarra averaged 6.8 points, 3.3 rebounds and 1.7 assists per game. On December 30, during his junior season, he was named Big 12 Conference Player of the Week, one day after scoring a career-high 25 points to go with seven assists and five rebounds in a 69–67 victory over Tulsa. On January 18, 2020, Diarra scored 25 points for a second time, while posting six rebounds and four assists, in an 84–68 win over West Virginia. As a junior, he averaged 13.3 points, 3.8 rebounds, 4.2 assists and 1.8 steals per game. On March 25, 2020, he announced that he would transfer from Kansas State.

=== Virginia Tech ===
On March 31, 2020, Diarra committed to play for Virginia Tech in his senior season. He was immediately eligible as a graduate transfer. In four games, Diarra averaged 7.5 points, 2.3 assists and 2.5 rebounds per game. On December 16, 2020, he announced he was opting out of the season, citing concerns over the spread of COVID-19.

== Professional career ==
After going undrafted in the 2021 NBA draft, Diarra made his professional debut with AB Contern of the Luxembourg Basketball League in 2020, and averaged 10.4 points in the 2021–22 season.

In October 2023, Diarra joined South African club Cape Town Tigers for the 2024 BAL qualification tournament. He was eligible as an African import player due to his Malian heritage. He helped Cape Town qualify for the main tournament, and scored the game-winning basket in the West Division final against City Oilers.

In November 2024, Diarra joined Malian champions Stade Malien in the Road to BAL.

== Career statistics ==
Legend
GP	Games played	GS	Games started	MPG	Minutes per game
FG%	Field goal percentage	3P%	3-point field goal percentage	FT%	Free throw percentage
RPG	Rebounds per game	APG	Assists per game	SPG	Steals per game
BPG	Blocks per game	PPG	Points per game	**Bold**	Career high

=== College ===
Year	Team	GP	GS	MPG	FG%	3P%	FT%	RPG	APG	SPG	BPG	PPG
2016–17	Kansas State	Redshirt										
2017–18	Kansas State	**37**	22	23.8	**.469**	**.405**	**.723**	2.5	2.0	.8	.1	7.1
2018–19	Kansas State	26	9	25.5	.404	.365	.702	3.3	1.7	.9	**.3**	6.8
2019–20	Kansas State	32	**27**	**31.3**	.412	.305	.669	**3.8**	**4.2**	**1.8**	**.3**	**13.3**
2020–21	Virginia Tech	4	0	19.8	.435	.125	.692	2.5	2.3	.0	**.3**	7.5
Career		99	58	26.5	.427	.339	.692	3.1	2.6	1.1	.2	9.0
