= Babacar Sané =

Senegalese basketball player (born 2003)

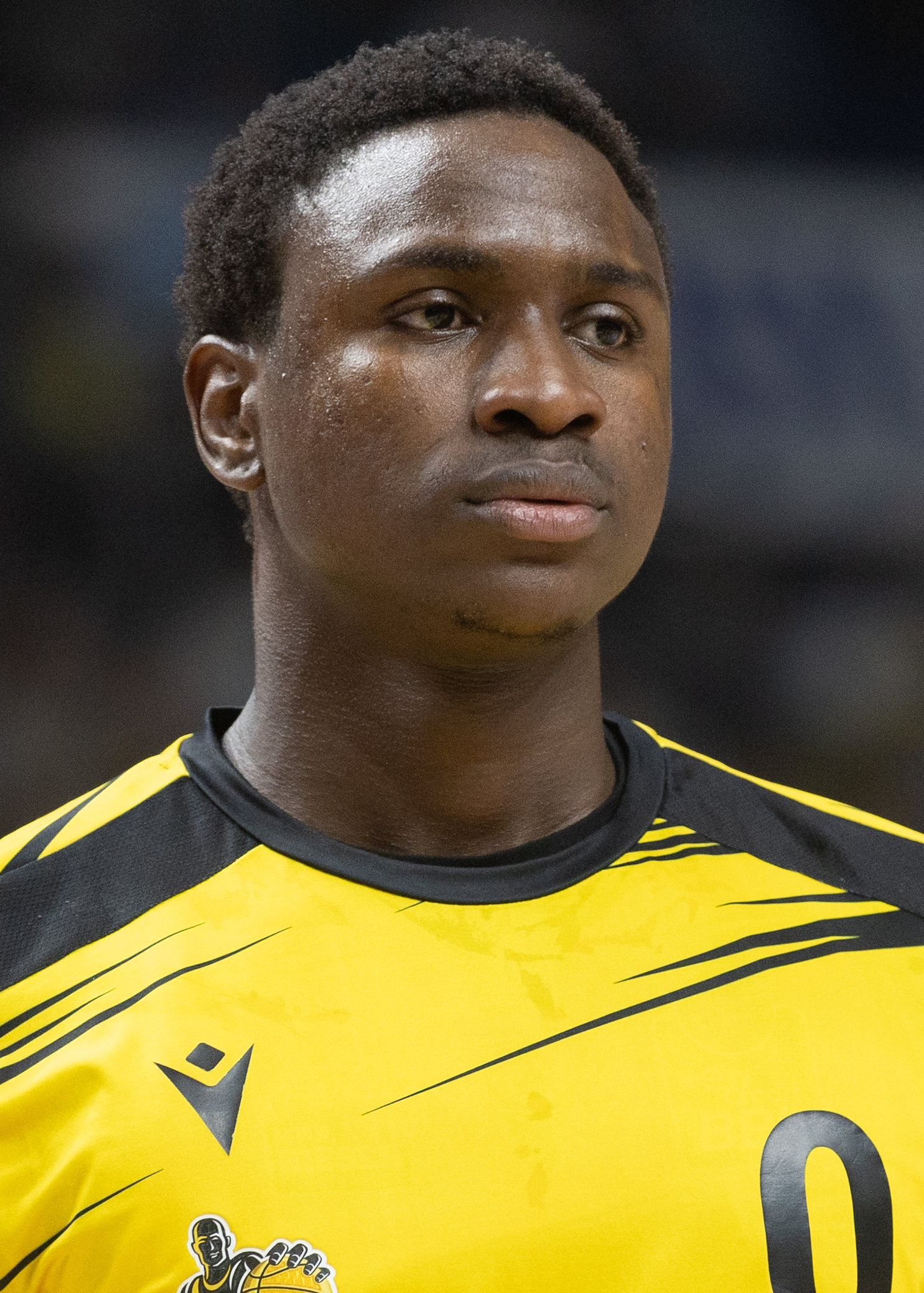
- Sané in 2025

No. 0 – St. John's Red Storm
- Position: Small forward
- League: Big East Conference

Personal information
- Born: 19 September 2003 (age 23) Ziguinchor, Senegal
- Listed height: 6 ft 7 in (2.01 m)
- Listed weight: 230 lb (104 kg)

Career information
- High school: NBA Academy Africa (Saly, Senegal)
- College: St. John's (2026–present)
- NBA draft: 2024: undrafted
- Playing career: 2022–present

Career history
- 2022: DUC
- 2022–2024: NBA G League Ignite
- 2024–2025: Salt Lake City Stars
- 2025: Iowa Wolves
- 2025: US Monastir
- 2025–2026: Riesen Ludwigsburg

Career highlights
- All-BAL Second Team (2025); 2× NBA G League Next Up Game (2023, 2024)
- Stats at NBA.com
- Stats at Basketball Reference
Medals
Men's basketball
Representing Senegal
FIBA U18 African Championship
Silver medal – second place	Egypt 2020	Team

Babacar Sané (born 19 September 2003), nicknamed Younq Ossoko, is a Senegalese college basketball player for the St. John's Red Storm of the Big East Conference. Internationally, he plays for the Senegal national team.

== Early life ==
Born in the city of Ziguinchor, Sané grew up in Bignona, where he was discovered by the NBA Academy Africa after playing in the SEED Project Hoop Forum.

== College career ==
On 18 May 2026, Sane committed to St. John's University to play college basketball for the Red Storm. On 4 September 2026, Sane sued the NCAA and was granted a temporary restraining order and eligibility for the 2026–27 season.

== Professional career ==
=== DUC (2022) ===
In May 2022, Sané played for Dakar Université Club in the 2022 BAL season as part of the BAL Elevate program in which one player from the NBA Academy was assigned to a roster. On 5 March, he made his BAL debut in a 70–85 loss to SLAC and had 8 points and 3 rebounds in 21 minutes. He averaged 4 points off the bench in 10.9 minutes per game.

=== NBA G League Ignite (2022–2024) ===
On 26 October 2022, Sané signed with the NBA G League Ignite. On 18 January, Sané scored 17 points and grabbed 18 rebounds, a franchise record for most rebounds in a game. He was named to the G League's inaugural Next Up Game for the 2022–23 season.

=== Salt Lake City Stars (2024–2025) ===
After going undrafted in the 2024 NBA Draft, Sané signed with the Utah Jazz on 14 August 2024, but was waived on 26 September. On October 28, he joined the Salt Lake City Stars.

=== Iowa Wolves (2025) ===
On February 2, 2025, Sané was traded to the Iowa Wolves of the NBA G League in exchange for Jaedon LeDee.

=== US Monastir (2025) ===
In May 2025, Sané joined Tuinisian champions US Monastir for the 2025 BAL season, his second appearance in the BAL. He head a breakout season with Monastir, and was named to the All-BAL Second Team. He averaged 12.5 points, 5.2 rebounds on 47.9% shooting over the season.

=== Riesen Ludwigsburg (2025–present) ===
On September 3, 2025, he joined German club Riesen Ludwigsburg of the Basketball Bundesliga.

== National team career ==
Sané played for the Senegal U18 national team at the 2020 FIBA U18 African Championship in Egypt, averaging 14 points per game, and winning a silver medal. He also played in the 2019 FIBA U19 World Cup.

On 25 February 2022, he made his debut for the senior Senegal national team in a 2023 FIBA World Cup qualifier against Egypt.
