= Mohamed Sadi =

Libyan basketball player (born 1995)

No. 10 – Al Ahli Tripoli
- Position: Shooting guard
- League: Libyan Division I Basketball League; BAL

Personal information
- Born: 8 May 1995 (age 31)
- Listed height: 1.94 m (6 ft 4 in)

Career information
- NBA draft: 2017: undrafted

Career history
- 2016–present: Al Ahli Tripoli
- 2019: Al-Nasr Benghazi
- 2021: AS Douanes
- 2022: Al Sadd
- 2023–2024: Sagesse

Career highlights
- BAL champion (2025); All-BAL Second Team (2025); BAL All-Defensive Second Team (2025); 3× Libyan Division I champion (2021, 2022, 2024); 3× Libyan Division I MVP (2020, 2021, 2024)

Mohamed Bashir Abdourahman Sadi (born 8 May 1995) is a Libyan basketball player who plays for Al Ahli Tripoli of the Libyan Division I Basketball League and the Libya men's national team. Standing at 1.94 m (6 ft 4 1/2 in), he plays as shooting guard. He is considered as the best Libyan basketball player of all time and one of the best Arab and African players.

Sadi won three Libyan League title and captained Al Ahli Tropilo to the Basketball Africa League (BAL) championship in 2025.

== Early life ==
When he was a child, Sadi started playing basketball at the Libyan club Al-Wahda, Growing up, Sadi's favourite player was Carlos Morais.

== Professional career ==
Sadi has played for Al Ahli Tripoli and was named the Libya Division 1 Best Player in 2020, 2021 and 2024.

Sadi played a short stint with Al-Nasr Benghazi in the 2021 BAL qualifying tournaments, where he averaged 12.3 points and 9.7 rebounds per game. He later joined Senegalese champions AS Douanes on the roster for the 2022 BAL season.

In October 2022, Sadi played for Qatari club Al Sadd.

In September 2023, Sadi joined Sagesse SC of the Lebanese Basketball League.

Sadi kept playing with Al Ahli Tripoli since 2016, and won championships in 2021, 2022 and 2024. In November 2024, Sadi was part of Al Ahli's team that successfully won the Road to BAL West Division, and therefore sealed the team's first Basketball Africa League (BAL) appearance.

During the 2024–25 season, Sadi was crucial in leading Al Ahli Tripoli to its first-ever BAL appearance. He captained the team in their inaugural season, and helped them win the championship, the first ever by a Libyan team. Sadi started in all ten games and averaged 12.1 points, 7.8 rebounds and 2.9 assists per game. He was named to the BAL All-Defensive Second Team on 14 June. On June 18, Sadi was selected for the All-BAL Second Team.

== National team career ==
Internationally, Sadi plays for his country Libya, He is the captain of Libya Basketball National Team. Sadi played a pivotal role in leading the Libyan national basketball team to the final of the Arab Nations Championship in Egypt at the end of 2023—a historic first for Libya. However, the Libyan team lost to the host nation, Egypt, with score 87–62 in an epic match amid a home-court advantage. Despite the defeat, the Libyan team secured the runner-up title and the silver medal.

Sadi also made significant contributions during the FIBA AfroBasket qualifiers in both the first and second windows. Libya won 4 out of 6 games, topping their group and securing a spot in the FIBA AfroBasket tournament—marking their return to the competition after a 16-year absence.

Sadi made history by becoming the first player ever in the qualifiers to record a triple-double in Libya's thrilling 89–82 overtime victory over Nigeria back in February 2024. He delivered an outstanding triple-double performance with 24 points, 12 assists, and 10 steals, along with 9 rebounds, becoming the first player in AfroBasket qualifying history to do so.

== BAL career statistics ==
Legend
GP	Games played	GS	Games started	MPG	Minutes per game
FG%	Field goal percentage	3P%	3-point field goal percentage	FT%	Free throw percentage
RPG	Rebounds per game	APG	Assists per game	SPG	Steals per game
BPG	Blocks per game	PPG	Points per game	**Bold**	Career high

Year	Team	GP	GS	MPG	FG%	3P%	FT%	RPG	APG	SPG	BPG	PPG
2021	AS Douanes	3	0	9.7	.200	.000	–	1.0	.3	1.0	0.0	1.3
2025	Al Ahli	**10**	**10**	**30.4**	**.454**	**.453**	**.818**	**7.8**	**2.9**	**2.0**	0.0	**12.1**
