= Mahamane Coulibaly =

Malian basketball player (born 2001)

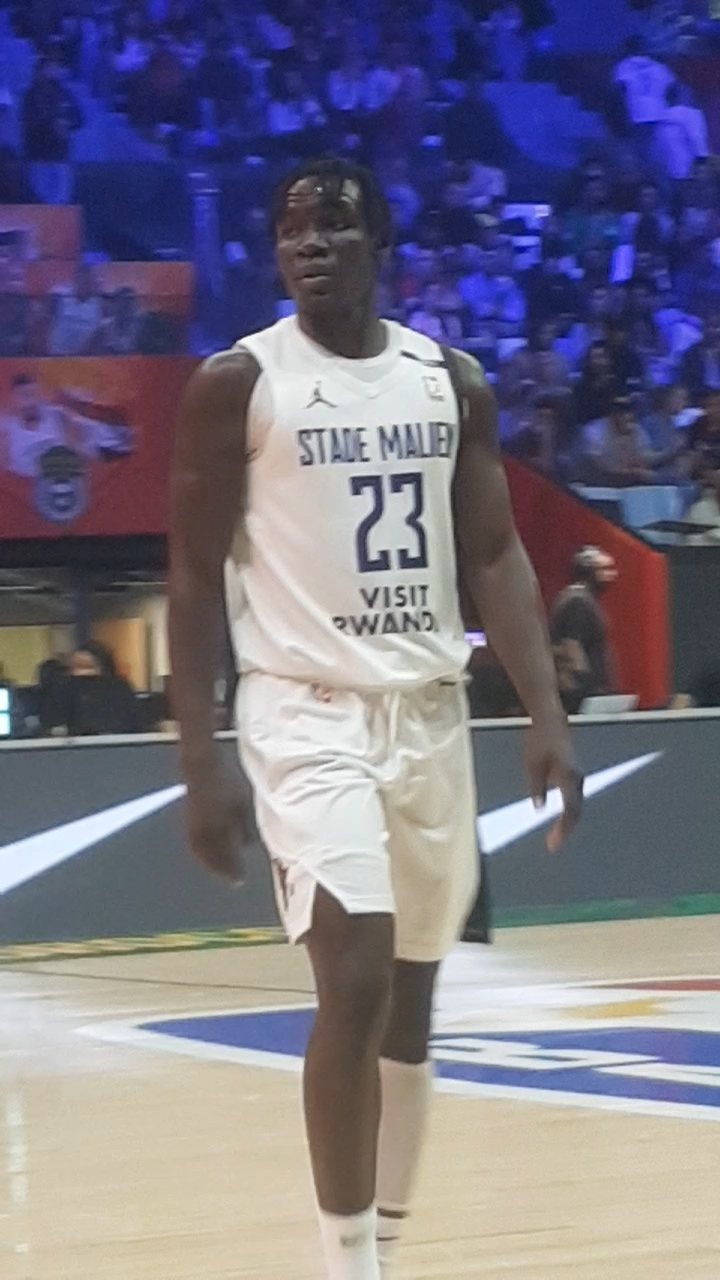
- Coulibaly during the 2025 BAL season

JCA Abidjan
- Position: Small forward
- League: Road to BAL

Personal information
- Born: January 28, 2001 (age 25) Tombouctou Region, Mali
- Listed height: 2.06 m (6 ft 9 in)

Career information
- Playing career: 2023–present

Career history
- Attar Club
- 2023–present: Stade Malien
- 2025–present: JCA Abidjan
Medals
Men's basketball
Representing Mali
AfroBasket
Silver medal – second place	2025 Angola

Mahamane Coulibaly (born January 28, 2001) is a Malian professional basketball player for Stade Malien of the Ligue 1 and Basketball Africa League (BAL). He also plays for the Mali national basketball team and won a silver medal at FIBA AfroBasket 2025.

== Club career ==
A native of the Tombouctou Region, where he attended the Centre Nialy Bagna de Tombouctou (CNBT). He began his career in the top division Ligue 1 with Attar Club of Kidal. Coulibaly joined Stade Malien for the 2023–24 season. He was named the MVP of the 2023 Super Cup game. He was Stade Malien's best player of the 2023–24 season.

Coulibaly debuted in the Basketball Africa League (BAL) during the 2025 season, and averaged 15.3 points and 4.3 rebounds on 46.6% shooting during the season.

He joined JCA from Ivory Coast in October 2025, to play in the Road to BAL.

== National team career ==
Coulibaly debuted for the Mali national team during the AfroBasket 2025 qualification games, when he played his first game on February 21, 2025, with 9 points against the DR Congo. During the main tournament, Coulibaly had a game-high 23 points in the semifinal win over Senegal, that secured Mali's first-ever AfroBasket final appearance. They fell to hosts Angola in the final, thus finishing as runners-up, the country's best performance in history. Coulibaly was named to the All-Tournament Team, following his averages of 14 points, 3.3 rebounds and 2.3 assists per game.

== BAL career statistics ==
Legend
GP	Games played	GS	Games started	MPG	Minutes per game
FG%	Field goal percentage	3P%	3-point field goal percentage	FT%	Free throw percentage
RPG	Rebounds per game	APG	Assists per game	SPG	Steals per game
BPG	Blocks per game	PPG	Points per game	**Bold**	Career high

Year	Team	GP	GS	MPG	FG%	3P%	FT%	RPG	APG	SPG	BPG	PPG
2025	Stade Malien	6	6	28.4	.459	.185	.625	3.5	2.2	1.5	0.5	14.7
