= Salle Moulay Abdellah =

Indoor sporting arena in Rabat, Morocco

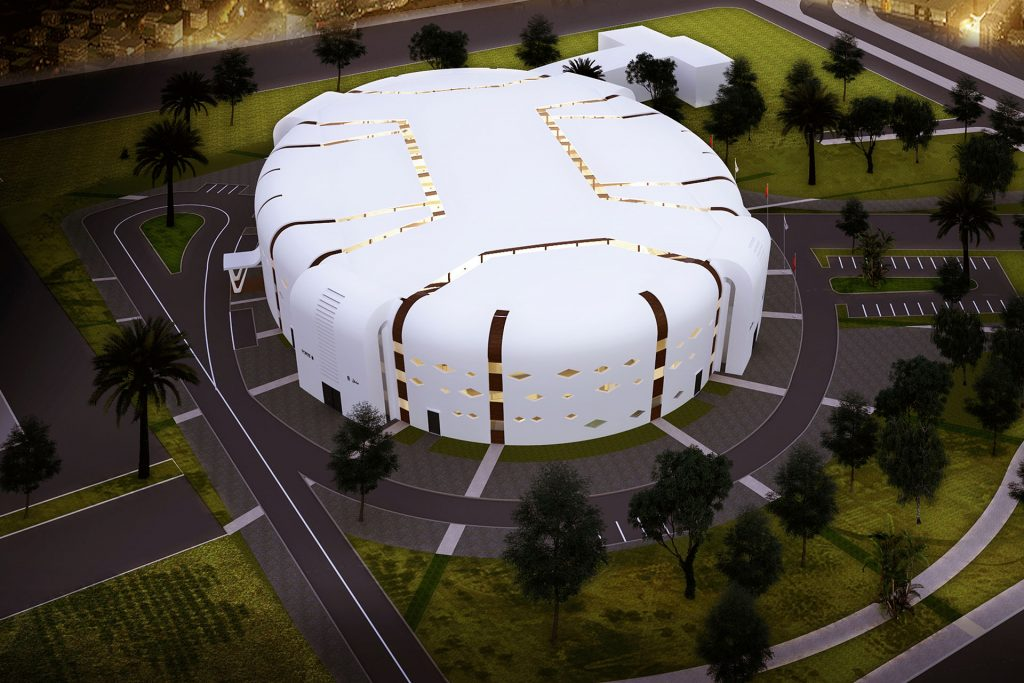
- Interactive map of Salle Moulay Abdellah
- Address: Rabat; Morocco
- Coordinates: 33°57′44″N 6°53′13″W
- Capacity: 10,000

Construction
- Opened: 2000
- Renovated: 2024

Salle Moulay Abdellah is an indoor sporting arena located in Rabat, Morocco. The capacity of the arena is 10,000 people. The arena is used to host indoor sporting events, such as basketball and volleyball. The arena was inaugurated in 2000 and named after Prince Moulay Abdallah of Morocco. The exterior of the arena was renovated in 2024 to match the style of the new version of the Prince Moulay Abdellah Stadium, and to integrate it in the Sports Complex.

== International events ==
- 2024 Futsal Africa Cup of Nations
- 2025 Women's Futsal Africa Cup of Nations
- 2025 BAL season (Nile Conference)
