= Majok Deng =

South Sudanese-Australian basketball player (born 1993)

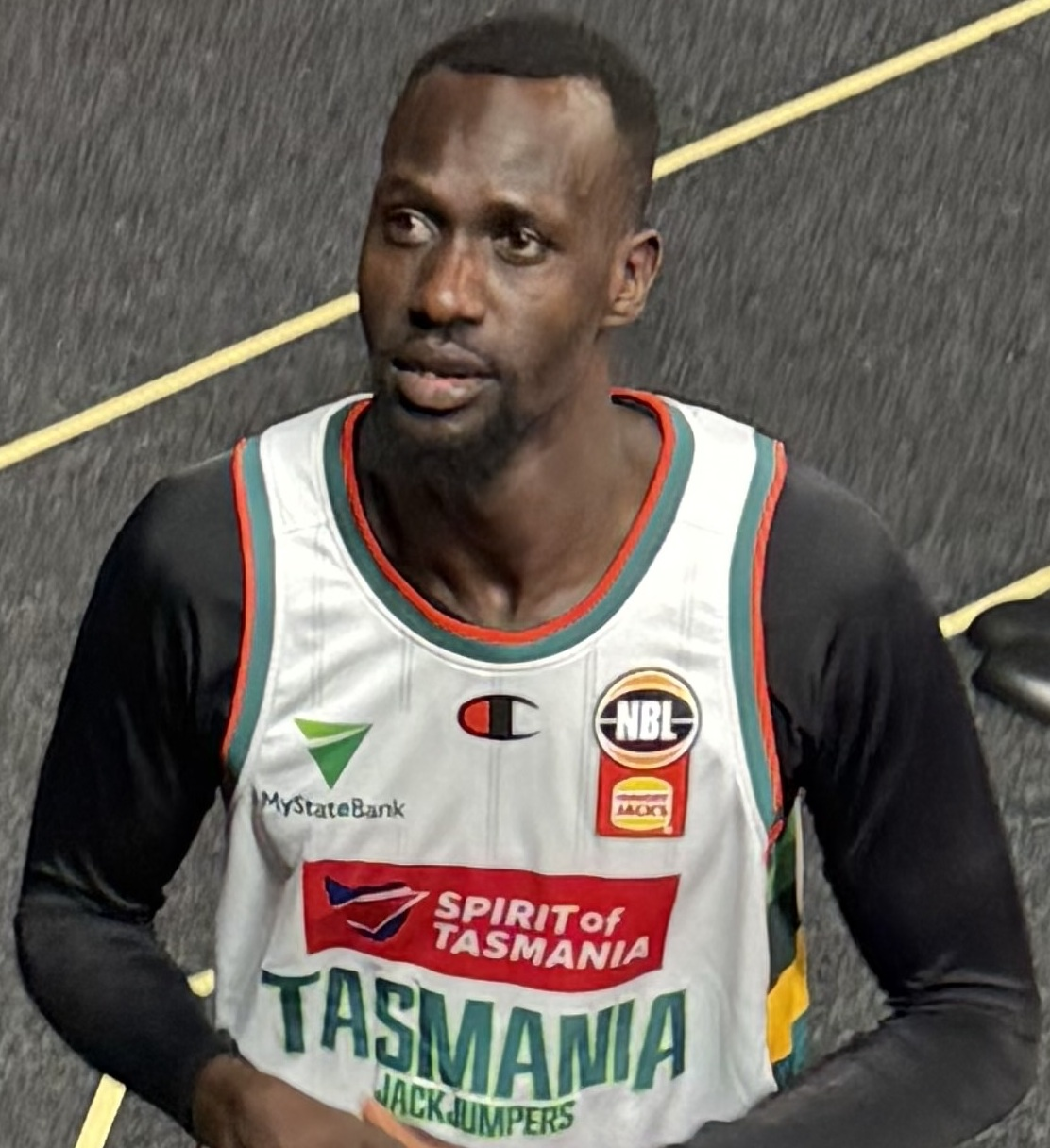
- Deng with the Tasmania JackJumpers in 2025

No. 5 – Tasmania JackJumpers
- Position: Power forward
- League: NBL

Personal information
- Born: 1 March 1993 (age 33) Bor, Sudan (now South Sudan)
- Listed height: 205 cm (6 ft 9 in)
- Listed weight: 84 kg (185 lb)

Career information
- High school: Windsor Gardens Vocational College (Adelaide, South Australia)
- College: Indian Hills CC (2012–2014); Louisiana–Monroe (2014–2016)
- NBA draft: 2016: undrafted
- Playing career: 2011–present

Career history
- 2011–2012: Forestville Eagles
- 2016–2019: Adelaide 36ers
- 2017: Forestville Eagles
- 2018: Mount Gambier Pioneers
- 2018–2019: Forestville Eagles
- 2019–2023: Cairns Taipans
- 2021: Cairns Marlins
- 2022: Ipswich Force
- 2023: Logan Thunder
- 2023–present: Tasmania JackJumpers
- 2024: Al-Ahly Benghazi
- 2025: Al Ittihad Alexandria
- 2026–present: Al-Ahly Benghazi

Career highlights
- NBL champion (2024); 3× Premier League champion (2011, 2012, 2019); All-BAL First Team (2025); All-BAL Second Team (2024); All-BAL Defensive Second Team (2025); All-NBL1 North First Team (2023); NBL1 North scoring champion (2021); First-team All-Sun Belt (2016); Third-team All-Sun Belt (2015)

Majok Machar Deng (born 1 March 1993) is a South Sudanese-Australian professional basketball player for the Tasmania JackJumpers of the National Basketball League (NBL). He played college basketball in the United States for Indian Hills Community College and Louisiana–Monroe. He debuted in the NBL for the Adelaide 36ers in 2016. After three seasons for the 36ers, he joined the Cairns Taipans in 2019 where he spent four seasons. He won an NBL championship with the JackJumpers in 2024.

== Early life and career ==
Deng was born in Bor, Sudan on 1 March 1993, and spent the first seven to eight years of his life in the country. He moved to Australia in 2006 after spending a number of years living in a Kenyan refugee camp. Deng settled down in Adelaide with his mother and sister, where he attended Windsor Gardens Vocational College.

Deng originally dreamed of playing professional soccer, but a significant growth spurt of 11 cm in 12 months changed his life, switching him from soccer to basketball. He took up basketball in 2009, and in 2011 he debuted for the Forestville Eagles in the Central ABL. He helped the Eagles win the 2011 Central ABL championship, recording two points, six rebounds, one steal and one block in an 82–68 victory over the Norwood Flames. In 18 games for the Eagles in 2011, he averaged 4.2 points and 2.7 rebounds per game.

Deng returned to the Forestville Eagles for the 2012 Central ABL season, where in 16 games, he averaged 10.3 points and 5.9 rebounds per game. His final game for the Eagles came on 18 August 2012 in the Eagles' semi-final loss to the Sturt Sabres; he scored 13 points in the match. The Eagles went on to win the 2012 Central ABL championship without Deng.

== College career ==
=== Indian Hills (2012–2014) ===
Deng moved to the United States in 2012 to play college basketball for Indian Hills Community College, where he joined the Warriors men's basketball program. As a freshman in 2012–13, Deng played in 27 games and was one of the first players used off the bench by coach Barret Peery. He averaged 3.8 points and 2.9 rebounds per game. Deng's highlight moment of the season came when he drilled three three-pointers in overtime to help Indian Hills topple Southeastern 104–99.

On 7 November 2013, Deng was named the recipient of the Arnold Black Memorial Scholarship. It is awarded to a sophomore member of the Warriors who best exemplifies the strong competitive spirit shown by Black and exhibits his love for the game of basketball. As a sophomore in 2013–14, Deng averaged 5.0 points and 4.1 rebounds per game. His top offensive performance came when he scored 16 points in a 132–84 victory over John Wood Community College. He guided the program to a 34–3 record in 2013–14 and a combined 60–7 record in his two years. He also led Indian Hills to the 2014 Regional and District Championships.

=== Louisiana–Monroe (2014–2016) ===
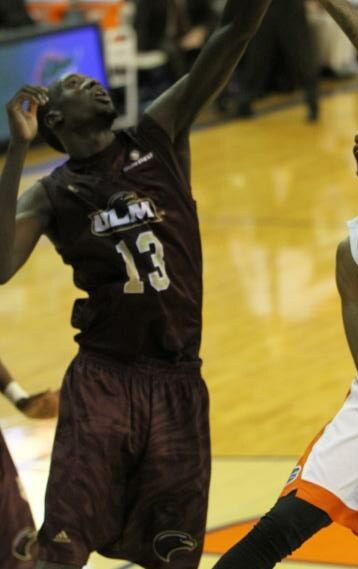
Deng with the Louisiana–Monroe Warhawks in 2014

On 22 April 2014, Deng signed a National Letter of Intent to play Division I college basketball for Louisiana–Monroe.

As a junior at Louisiana–Monroe in 2014–15, Deng played in all 38 games and made 37 starts. He recorded eight double-doubles, 25 double-figure scoring games and a pair of 20-plus scoring outings. He averaged 10.7 points and a team-high 7.3 rebounds per game on the year. He also led the team in blocked shots with 1.3 per game, ranking third in the league. He subsequently earned third-team All-Sun Belt Conference, All-Louisiana first team, and College Sports Madness All-SBC second team honours. In the CBI Tournament semi-final on 25 March 2015, Deng scored a season-high 22 points in a 71–65 win over Vermont. The Warhawks went on to lose the CBI Championship Series with a 2–0 defeat to Loyola.

As a senior in 2015–16, Deng was the Sun Belt Conference scoring champion, averaging 19.0 points per game in league play. He also finished first in the conference in blocks (1.9 bpg), third in minutes (37.5 mpg) and offensive rebounds (5.3 orpg), fifth in three-point field goal percentage (.421), sixth in three-pointers per game (2.3 3pg), seventh in rebounding (6.9 rpg) and eighth in free throw percentage (.793). He netted a trio of 30-plus scoring performances and 11 20-plus games. He won seven weekly awards including CollegeInsider.com National Mid-Major Player of the Week (7 December), Louisiana Player of the Week (21 December), College Sports Madness Player of the Week (25 January), SBC Student-Athlete of the Week (15 February), Louisiana Player of the Week (15 February), CSM Player of the Week (15 February) and SBC Student-Athlete of the Week (7 March). Overall, Deng averaged 18.4 points, 7.0 rebounds, 1.9 assists and 1.6 blocks in 31 games (all starts). On 21 January 2016, he tied his career high of 33 points against Troy, having previously scored 33 points a month earlier against Central Baptist. At the season's end, he earned first-team All-Sun Belt Conference, Sun Belt All-Tournament Team, NABC All-District 24 first team, and All-Louisiana first team.

=== College statistics ===
Year	Team	GP	GS	MPG	FG%	3P%	FT%	RPG	APG	SPG	BPG	PPG
2014–15	Louisiana–Monroe	38	37	30.7	.442	.345	.765	7.3	1.1	.6	1.3	10.7
2015–16	Louisiana–Monroe	31	31	36.3	.479	.376	.813	7.0	1.9	.7	1.6	18.4
Career		69	68	33.2	.462	.362	.794	7.2	1.5	.6	1.5	14.2

== Professional career ==
On 17 May 2016, Deng signed a three-year deal with the Adelaide 36ers of the National Basketball League (NBL). Later that month, he received an invite to work out with the Minnesota Timberwolves, and later played one game for the Timberwolves' Summer League team in Las Vegas.

With the 36ers in the 2016–17 season, Deng averaged 4.8 points and 2.2 rebounds in 26 games. Following his rookie season in the NBL, Deng re-joined the Forestville Eagles of the South Australian Premier League for the 2017 season. In 17 games for the Eagles, he averaged 26.9 points, 12.1 rebounds and 2.3 assists per game.

On 4 January 2018, Deng scored 16 final quarter points to lead Adelaide to a 97–86 win over the Perth Wildcats. He had 11 points in the first three minutes of the last term. On 17 February 2018, he scored 20 points, including 13-of-14 free throws, in a 105–82 win over the Brisbane Bullets. Deng helped the 36ers reach the 2018 NBL Grand Final series, where they lost to Melbourne United in five games. In 35 games in 2017–18, he averaged 7.3 points and 2.6 rebounds per game.

Deng joined the Mount Gambier Pioneers of the South East Australian Basketball League (SEABL) for the 2018 season. He appeared in one game for the Pioneers before he was sidelined with a severe ankle injury. On 23 May, he was released by the Pioneers in order for him to prepare for NBA camps in June. He ultimately did not partake due to the ankle injury and instead re-joined the Forestville Eagles, where he had a three-game stint to finish the 2018 Premier League season.

With the 36ers in 2018–19, Deng averaged 7.6 points and 2.9 rebounds per game. Following his season with the 36ers, he re-joined the Forestville Eagles, helping them win the 2019 Premier League championship. In 19 games for the Eagles, he averaged 27.74 points, 11.63 rebounds and 2.89 assists per game.

On 5 April 2019, Deng signed a three-year deal with the Cairns Taipans. On 24 February 2021, he was ruled out for six weeks with a partial tear to his left MCL. In June 2021, he joined the Cairns Marlins of the NBL1 North for the rest of the 2021 NBL1 season.

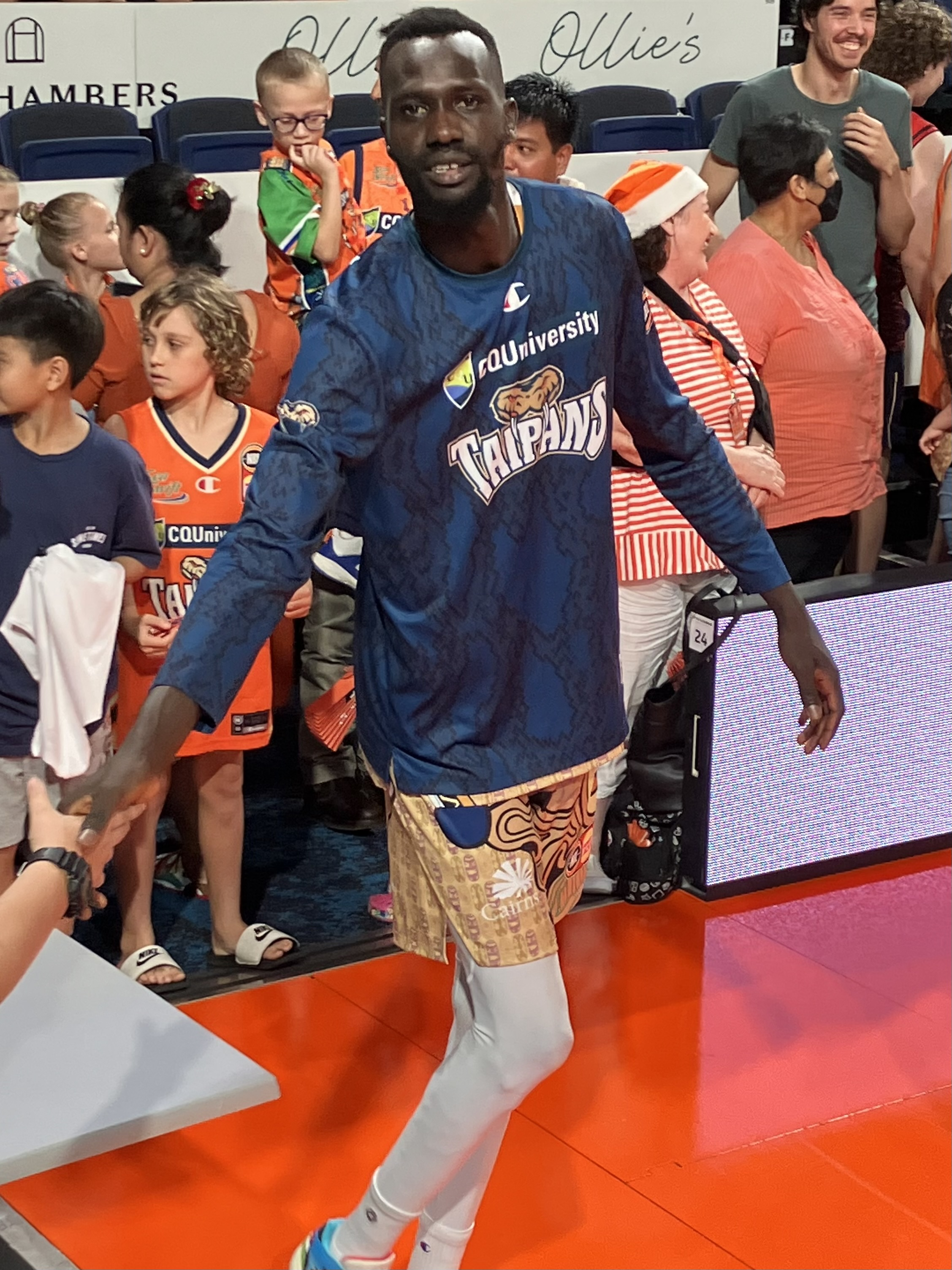
Deng with the Taipans in December 2022

On 13 July 2021, Deng re-signed with the Taipans on a new three-year deal. Following the 2021–22 NBL season, he joined the Ipswich Force for the 2022 NBL1 North season. He parted ways with the Taipans following the 2022–23 NBL season and joined the Logan Thunder for the 2023 NBL1 North season. He was named to the All-NBL1 North First Team.

On 28 June 2023, Deng signed with the Tasmania JackJumpers for the 2023–24 NBL season. An ankle injury in round 12 saw him miss the rest of regular season. Prior to the injury, he had lost his spot in the regular rotation. He returned to the line-up in the semi-finals and had 18 points in the decisive game three against the Perth Wildcats to help the JackJumpers reach the 2024 NBL Grand Final series. In the grand final series, he had 15 points in the final quarter of game three to lead Tasmania to victory, with the JackJumpers going on to defeat Melbourne United 3–2 to win the championship.

Following the NBL season, Deng joined Libyan side Al-Ahly Benghazi of the Basketball Africa League (BAL) for the 2024 season. He helped Al-Ahly Benghazi reach the final, where they lost to Petro de Luanda. Deng was named to the All-BAL Second Team after averaging 15.0 points, 7.3 rebounds and 1.8 assists per game on the season.

On 11 April 2024, Deng re-signed with the JackJumpers on a two-year deal. On 10 January 2025, he recorded 26 points and eight rebounds in a 104–103 overtime win over the Adelaide 36ers. Following the 2024–25 NBL season, he joined Al Ittihad Alexandria of the Egyptian Super League. He played for Al Ittihad Alexandria during the 2025 BAL season, where he was named to the All-BAL First Team and the BAL All-Defensive Second Team.

In round two of the 2025–26 NBL season, Deng suffered a hamstring injury that ruled him out until November. On 14 February 2026, he scored a career-high 36 points in a 120–104 loss to the South East Melbourne Phoenix.

Following the 2025–26 NBL season, Deng joined Al-Ahly Benghazi for the 2026 BAL season.

On 13 April 2026, Deng re-signed with the JackJumpers on a two-year deal (second year mutual option). On 29 September 2026, he was ruled out for at least four weeks after fracturing his fibula. On 30 October, he was ruled out for a further six weeks due to the fibula injury.

== National team career ==
In 2022, Deng was selected to play for the South Sudanese national team in the FIBA World Cup Qualifiers. The following year, he played for South Sudan in the 2023 FIBA World Cup.

Deng was named in South Sudan's final roster for the 2024 Olympics.

In August 2026, Deng played for South Sudan during the FIBA Basketball World Cup 2027 African Qualifiers.

== Personal life ==
Deng and his wife Nyre have two children.

Deng officially became an Australian citizen in May 2021.
