= 2023–24 City Oilers season =

Sports season

City Oilers
2023–24 season
- Head coach: Mandy Juruni (October–November); Andrew Tendo (December–present); Karim Nesba (BAL games)
- NBL: TBD
- Playoffs: TBD
- BAL: 4th in Nile Conference

The 2023–24 City Oilers season is the 12th season in the existence of the Ugandan basketball club City Oilers. It is the second straight season the Oilers play in the Basketball Africa League (BAL), following a successful performance in their fourth qualification campaign.

It was the first NBL Uganda season without head coach Mandy Juruni, who left the team in December.

== Overview ==
Under head coach Marandy Juruni, the Oilers qualified for their second consecutive BAL season following a semi-final win over Burundi's Dynamo in the East Division of the 2024 BAL qualification.

In December 2023, it was announced Juruni was leaving the team, as he signed with Kepler BBC in Rwanda. On 22 December, Andrew Tendo took over head coaching duties. Karim Nesba, a former Morocco international, was appointed as coach specifically for the BAL season.

In the BAL, the Oilers were allocated in the Nile Conference for a second year in a row. Guard Germaine Roebuck Jr. was unable to participate due to injury, and BAL top scorer Falando Jones signed a contract with Smouha in Egypt.

== Roster ==
The following was the City Oilers roster for the 2024 BAL season.

=== Road to BAL roster (November) ===
City Oilers roster
Players
Coaches

Pos.	No.	Nat.	Name	Ht.	Age
G	00	(United States)	Petty, Parrish	1.87 m (6 ft 2 in)	37 – 5 April 1988
PF	1	(United States)	Miller Jr., Dane	2.03 m (6 ft 8 in)	35 – 10 May 1990
SG	4	(Uganda)	Drileba, Tonny	1.83 m (6 ft 0 in)	31 – 19 December 1993
	6	(Uganda)	Ssenkubuge, Allawi		23 – 24 August 2002
SG	7	(Uganda)	Muhwezi, Ivan	1.82 m (6 ft 0 in)	27 – 19 January 1998
CG	9	(Uganda)	Roebuck Jr., Germaine	1.96 m (6 ft 5 in)	28 – 29 July 1997
SG	10	(Uganda)	Opong, Robinson	1.90 m (6 ft 3 in)	36 – 10 May 1989
PF	11	(Uganda)	Odeke, Titus	2.08 m (6 ft 10 in)	26 – 29 December 1998
F	13	(Uganda)	Walujjo, Edrine	1.93 m (6 ft 4 in)	25 – 16 May 2000
PF	14	(Uganda)	Sebirumbi, Brandon Alan	2.05 m (6 ft 9 in)	35 – 15 May 1990
PF	15	(Uganda)	Okello, James	1.93 m (6 ft 4 in)	33 – 26 January 1992
PG	23	(Uganda)	Baale, Fayed	1.73 m (5 ft 8 in)	23 – 28 December 2001

Head coach

- (Uganda) Mandy Juruni

Assistant coach(es)

- (Uganda) Andrew Senyondwa

Legend

- (C) Team captain
- Injured

- Roster
Updated: 26 November 2023

=== BAL roster (April) ===
Note: Flags indicate national team eligibility at FIBA-sanctioned events. Players may hold other non-FIBA nationalities not displayed.

2023–24 City Oilers roster
Players
Coaches

Pos.	No.	Nat.	Name	Ht.	Age
PG	00	(United States)	Rembert, Patrick (I)	1.83 m (6 ft 0 in)	36 – 9 April 1989
PG	1	(Uganda)	Baale, Fayed	1.73 m (5 ft 8 in)	23 – 28 December 2001
PF	4	(Uganda)	Okello, James	1.93 m (6 ft 4 in)	33 – 26 January 1992
PF	6	(United States)	Miller Jr., Dane (I)	2.03 m (6 ft 8 in)	35 – 10 May 1990
SG	7	(Uganda)	Muhwezi, Ivan	1.82 m (6 ft 0 in)	27 – 19 January 1998
SG	10	(Uganda)	Drileba, Tony	1.83 m (6 ft 0 in)	31 – 19 December 1993
SF	12	(Uganda)	Allawi, Ssenkubuge	1.88 m (6 ft 2 in)	23 – 24 August 2002
C/PF	13	(Uganda)	Odeke, Titus	2.03 m (6 ft 8 in)	26 – 29 December 1998
SG	14	(Uganda)	Opong, Robinson	1.91 m (6 ft 3 in)	36 – 10 May 1989
PF	15	(Ghana)	Ahmed, Muhammed (I)	2.01 m (6 ft 7 in)	32 – 17 August 1993
G	23	(United States)	Culpepper, Randy (I)	1.83 m (6 ft 0 in)	36 – 16 May 1989
F	24	(South Sudan)	Maluach, Khaman (E)	2.18 m (7 ft 2 in)	18 – 13 September 2006

Head coach

- (Morocco) Karim Nesba

Assistant coach(es)

- (Uganda) Andrew Tendo
- (Uganda) Grace Kwizera

Legend

- (C) Team captain
- Injured

- Roster
Updated: 19 April 2024

== Games ==
=== Road to BAL ===
As a team participating in the 2023 BAL season, the Oilers were given a bye for the first round.

==== Elite 16 ====
21 November 2023	City Oilers (Uganda)	81–76	(Madagascar) COSPN	Johannesburg
17:00	Scoring by quarter: 18–20, 11–21, 29–16, 23–19
	Pts: Miller Jr. 26; Rebs: Miller Jr. 9 Asts: Miller Jr., Petty 5	Report	Pts: Coulter 16; Rebs: Coulter 12; Asts: Adewunmi, Ratianarivo 4	Arena: Ellis Park Arena; Referees: Arnold Moseya (RSA), Walelign Gebeto (ETH), Francisco Tando (ANG)

22 November 2023	JBC (Zimbabwe)	71–84	(Uganda) City Oilers	Johannesburg
11:00	Scoring by quarter: 22–20, 23–25, 17–20, 9–19
	Pts: Phiri, Tela 16; Rebs: Wek 13; Asts: Pfachi 4	Report	Pts: Petty 29; Rebs: Odeke 13; Asts: Miller Jr. 3	Arena: Ellis Park Arena; Referees: Walelign Gebeto (ETH), Tonton Banza Kalume (DRC)

23 November 2023	Ferroviário da Beira (Mozambique)	88–100	(Uganda) City Oilers	Johannesburg
17:00	Scoring by quarter: 19–17, 20–24, 22–27, 25–32
	Pts: Nurmamade 23; Rebs: Ubisse 8 Asts: Kennedy 6	Report	Pts: Roebuck Jr. 20; Rebs: Roebuck Jr. 11; Asts: Miller Jr. 9	Arena: Ellis Park Arena; Referees: Tonton Banza Kalume (DRC), Mbaye Seye (SEN), Walelign Gebeto (ETH)

==== Final phase ====
25 November 2023 Division Semifinal	City Oilers (Uganda)	72–61	(Burundi) Dynamo	Johannesburg
14:00	Scoring by quarter: 19–5, 12–19, 22–22, 19–15
	Pts: Opong 17; Rebs: Miller Jr. 10; Asts: Miller Jr. 6		Pts: Morman 15; Rebs: Obekpa 13; Asts: Ndikuriyo 5	Arena: Ellis Park Area; Referees: Arnold Moseya (RSA), Walelign Gebeto (ETH), Francisco Tando (ANG)

26 November 2023 Division Final	Cape Town Tigers (South Africa)	70–68	(Uganda) City Oilers	Johannesburg
14:00	Scoring by quarter: 22–22, 14–15, 24–15, 20–16
		Report		Arena: Ellis Park Arena; Referees: Diallo Mahamadou (MLI), Tonton Banza Kalume (DRC), Erick Otieno (KEN)

=== BAL ===
==== Nile Conference ====
Pos	Team	Pld	W	L	PF	PA	PD	PCT	Qualification
1	(Egypt) Al Ahly (H)	6	5	1	544	470	+74	.833	Advance to playoffs
2	(Libya) Al Ahly Ly	6	3	3	537	498	+39	.500 (Note: Head-to-head: Al Ahly Ly and Bangui SC were tied 1–1 in their games, +19 point differential for Al Ahly Ly over these two games.)	Advance to playoffs
3	(Central African Republic) Bangui SC	6	3	3	509	529	−20	.500	
4	(Uganda) City Oilers	6	1	5	468	561	−93	.167	

Source: BAL
Rules for classification: Tiebreakers
(H) Hosts
Notes:

19 April 2024	Al Ahly (Egypt)	99–76	(Uganda) City Oilers	6th of October
7:00 PM	Scoring by quarter: 28–16, 25–19, 26–21, 20–20
	Pts: Amin 16; Rebs: Mitchell 8 Asts: Amin, Elgizawy 5	Livestats	Pts: Rembert 21; Rebs: Maluach 8 Asts: Rembert 6	Arena: Hassan Moustafa Sports Hall; Attendance: 2,027; Referees: Kladji Mulla, Mbaye Seye, Silver Houngbedji

20 April 2024	Bangui SC (Central African Republic)	101–88	(Uganda) City Oilers	6th of October
4:00 PM	Scoring by quarter: 23–26, 27–17, 25–27, 26–18
	Pts: Darlan 22; Rebs: Darlan 10; Asts: Nwabuzor 10	Livestats	Pts: Maluach 29; Rebs: Maluach 11; Asts: Culpepper, Rembert 5	Arena: Hassan Moustafa Sports Hall; Attendance: 543; Referees: Kelsey Reynolds, Annie Joyce Muchenu, Oumar Sy

22 April 2024	City Oilers (Uganda)	68–79	(Libya) Al Ahly Ly	6th of October
4:00 PM	Scoring by quarter: 11–25, 13–25, 24–11, 20–18
	Pts: Rembert 17; Rebs: Maluach 19; Asts: Baale, Rembert 2	Livestats	Pts: Lual-Acuil 22; Rebs: Diabate 9 Asts: Diabate 11	Arena: Hassan Moustafa Sports Hall; Attendance: 450; Referees: Kladji Mulla, Amir Taboubi, Oumar Sy

24 April 2024	City Oilers (Uganda)	82–81	(Egypt) Al Ahly	6th of October
7:00 PM	Scoring by quarter: 23–21, 15–14, 18–19, 26–17
	Pts: Maluach 27; Rebs: Maluach 16; Asts: Miller Jr. 4	Livestats	Pts: Gardner 19; Rebs: Amin, Gardner 8 Asts: Lyons, Mitchell 4	Arena: Hassan Moustafa Sports Hall; Attendance: 2,589; Referees: Kenneth Gardner, Claudio Eiuba, Silver Hongbedji

26 April 2024	City Oilers (Uganda)	76–91	(Central African Republic) Bangui SC	6th of October
4:00 PM	Scoring by quarter: 12–19, 22–27, 27–18, 15–17
	Pts: Rembert 21; Rebs: Maluach 13; Asts: Culpepper 6	Livestats	Pts: Ngaïfei 22; Rebs: Ngaïfei 11; Asts: Darlan 7	Arena: Hassan Moustafa Sports Hall; Attendance: 678; Referees: Kaz Beverly, Sara Elsharnouby, Oumar Sy

27 April 2024	Al Ahly Ly (Libya)	110–78	(Uganda) City Oilers	6th of October
4:00 PM	Scoring by quarter: 20–22, 32–20, 23–24, 35–12
	Pts: Lual-Acuil 42; Rebs: Lual-Acuil 13; Asts: Diabate 8	Livestats	Pts: Ahmed, Culpepper 14; Rebs: Maluach 13; Asts: Miller Jr. 10	Arena: Hassan Moustafa Sports Hall; Attendance: 435; Referees: Kenneth Gardner, Annie Joyce Muchenu, Claudio Eiuba

== Player statistics ==
Legend
GP	Games played	GS	Games started	MPG	Minutes per game
FG%	Field-goal percentage	3P%	3-point field-goal percentage	FT%	Free-throw percentage
RPG	Rebounds per game	APG	Assists per game	SPG	Steals per game
BPG	Blocks per game	PPG	Points per game

=== Regular season ===
After all games.

City Oilers statistics
Player	GP	MPG	FG%	3FG%	FT%	RPG	APG	SPG	BPG	PPG
Khaman Maluach	6	34.3	.519	.235	.724	13.5	0.8	0.7	2.8	18.2
Patrick Rembert	6	32.9	.400	.303	.889	4.2	3.7	0.3	0.0	15.0
Randy Culpepper	6	31.8	.397	.286	.870	2.2	3.5	2.0	0.2	13.3
Dane Miller Jr.	6	30.1	.444	.364	.478	6.3	4.0	1.7	0.2	10.5
Muhammed Ahmed	6	17.6	.339	.286	.722	3.0	0.3	0.3	0.5	9.5
Robinson Opong	6	19.2	.260	.212	.833	2.7	0.7	0.7	0.0	6.3
James Okello	6	13.0	.462	.000	.000	1.3	0.8	0.2	0.0	2.0
Tonny Drileba	6	12.5	.308	.273	.000	1.5	1.2	0.0	0.0	1.8
Fayed Baale	2	10.2	.250	.000	.500	1.0	1.0	1.0	0.0	1.5
Titus Odeke	5	5.8	.250	.333	.000	1.2	0.0	0.0	0.2	1.0
Ivan Muhwezi	1	2.3	.000	.000	.000	1.0	0.0	1.0	0.0	0.0
