= 2022–23 City Oilers season =

The 2022–23 City Oilers season was the 12th season in the existence of the City Oilers basketball team from Uganda. The Oilers made their debut in the Basketball Africa League (BAL). Under head coach Mandy Juruni, they played in the Nile Conference and finished in fifth place following a 1–5 record.

== Roster ==
The following was the City Oilers roster for the 2023 BAL season.

2023 City Oilers roster
Players
Coaches

Pos.	No.	Nat.	Name	Ht.	Age
SG	0	(United States)	Justice Jr., James (I)	1.78 m (5 ft 10 in)	37 – 12 January 1989
PG	1	(Uganda)	Baale, Fayed	1.73 m (5 ft 8 in)	24 – 28 December 2001
SG	2	(Uganda)	Muhwezi, Ivan	1.82 m (6 ft 0 in)	28 – 19 January 1998
C	4	(Uganda)	Ghedi, Abdihakim	2.08 m (6 ft 10 in)	28 – 10 March 1998
PG	5	(Uganda)	Enabu, Jimmy	1.87 m (6 ft 2 in)	38 – 17 April 1988
PF	6	(Uganda)	Okello, James (C)	1.93 m (6 ft 4 in)	34 – 26 January 1992
SF	7	(United States)	Jones, Falando (I)	1.93 m (6 ft 4 in)	36 – 9 May 1990
SG	10	(Uganda)	Drileba, Tony	1.83 m (6 ft 0 in)	32 – 19 December 1993
G	11	(Nigeria)	Obe, Segun (E)		21 – 6 September 2005
PF	13	(Uganda)	Odeke, Titus	2.08 m (6 ft 10 in)	27 – 29 December 1998
SF	14	(Uganda)	Roebuck Jr., Germaine	1.96 m (6 ft 5 in)	29 – 29 July 1997
F	24	(Uganda)	Walujjo, Edrine	1.93 m (6 ft 4 in)	26 – 16 May 2000
G	28	(South Sudan)	Barnaba, Ngor (I)	2.06 m (6 ft 9 in)	30 – 8 March 1996

Head coach

(Uganda) Mandy Juruni

Assistant coach(es)

- (Uganda) Grace Kwizera

Legend

- (C) Team captain
- Injured

- Roster
Updated: September 25, 2023

== Games ==
=== Road to BAL ===
==== First round ====
28 October	City Oilers (Uganda)	90–54	(Zambia) Matero Magic	Dar es Salaam
16:30	Scoring by quarter: 19–19, 24–9, 24–10, 23–16
	Pts: Roebuck 26; Rebs: Azolibe 9 Asts: Okello 6	Boxscore	Pts: Mukelabai 11; Rebs: Mauwe 8 Asts: Mauwe 5	Arena: Benjamin Mpaka National Indoor Stadium

29 October	Urunani (Burundi)	64–58	(Uganda) City Oilers	Dar es Salaam
16:30	Scoring by quarter: 19–9, 9–14, 18–20, 18–15
	Pts: Kazunguzibwa 21	Boxscore	Pts: Roebuck, Azolide 17	Arena: Benjamin Mpaka National Indoor Stadium

30 October	City Oilers (Uganda)	71–63	(Tanzania) ABC	Dar es Salaam
19:00	Scoring by quarter: 27–20, 10–15, 16–17, 18–11
	Pts: Roebuck 31	Boxscore	Pts: Athumani 31	Arena: Benjamin Mpaka National Indoor Stadium

==== Elite 16 ====
===== Group phase =====
22 November	City Oilers (Uganda)	71–59	(Madagascar) COSPN	Johannesburg
11:30	Scoring by quarter: 22–11, 25–15, 11–23, 13–10
	Pts: Roebuck 17; Rebs: Barnaba 10; Asts: Drileba 3	Report	Pts: Randriamampionona 14; Rebs: Solondrainy, Rabibisoa 7 Asts: Randriamampionona, Todimasiniaina 4	Arena: Ellis Park Arena

23 November	Matero Magic (Zambia)	73–83	(Uganda) City Oilers	Johannesburg
16:30	Scoring by quarter: 17–17, 8–26, 18–17, 30–23
	Pts: Phiri 18; Rebs: Kandulu 14; Asts: Ngoma 4	Report	Pts: Jones 26; Rebs: Jones 9 Asts: Enabu 5	Arena: Ellis Park Arena

24 November	Ferroviário da Beira (Mozambique)	72–88	(Uganda) City Oilers	Johannesburg
16:30	Scoring by quarter: 16–23, 20–19, 14–23, 22–23
	Pts: Perry 21; Rebs: Ubisse 9 Asts: Perry 7	Report	Pts: Roebuck, Barnaba 17; Rebs: Barnaba 9 Asts: Enabu 7	Arena: Ellis Park Arena

===== Semifinal =====
26 November	City Oilers (Uganda)	69–75	(South Africa) Cape Town Tigers	Johannesburg
19:00 (GMT+2)	Scoring by quarter: 7–14, 19–16, 26–21, 17–24
	Pts: Jones 40	Report		Arena: Ellis Park Arena

===== Third place game =====
27 November	Urunani (Burundi)	62–71	(Uganda) City Oilers	Johannesburg
16:30 (GMT+2)	Scoring by quarter: 12–17, 14–10, 14–19, 22–25
		Report		Arena: Ellis Park Arena

=== BAL ===
==== Nile Conference ====
27 April 2023 1	Petro de Luanda (Angola)	89–71	(Uganda) City Oilers	6th of October
20:30	Scoring by quarter: 21–14, 21–25, 24–20, 23–12
	Pts: Gakou 16; Rebs: Hollis 10; Asts: Majok 5	RealGM Report	Pts: Jones 22; Rebs: Justice Jr., Roebuck Jr. 8 Asts: Justice Jr. 5	Arena: Hassan Moustafa Sports Hall; Attendance: 657

29 April 2023 2	City Oilers (Uganda)	70–72	(Egypt) Al Ahly	6th of October
19:30	Scoring by quarter: 14–20, 13–20, 9–21, 34–11
	Pts: Roebuck Jr. 28; Rebs: Roebuck Jr. 11; Asts: Enabu 4	Livestats	Pts: Omot 17; Rebs: Oraby 10; Asts: Tarek 5	Arena: Hassan Moustafa Sports Hall; Attendance: 1,372; Referees: Catherine Chang, Kingsley Ojeaburu, Walelign Fikadu Gebeto

2 May 2023 3	City Oilers (Uganda)	68–96	(Guinea) SLAC	6th of October
17:00	Scoring by quarter: 13–24, 12–20, 24–33, 19–19
	Pts: Justice Jr. 30; Rebs: Barnaba 9 Asts: Roebuck Jr. 4	BAL Report	Pts: Iroegbu 22; Rebs: Conde 9 Asts: Miller Jr. 10	Arena: Hassan Moustafa Sports Hall; Attendance: N/A; Referees: Catherine Chang, Wael Ibrahim Mostafa, Mbaye Seye

5 May 2023 4	City Oilers (Uganda)	96–75	(Mozambique) Ferroviário da Beira	6th of October
16:00	Scoring by quarter: 23–16, 27–21, 24–15, 22–23
	Pts: Justice Jr. 25; Rebs: Roebuck Jr. 9 Asts: Justice Jr. 6	BAL Report	Pts: Young 29; Rebs: Perry, Young 8 Asts: Perry 4	Arena: Hassan Moustafa Sports Hall; Attendance: 1,012; Referees: Ian McClenny, Walelign Gebeto, Mahamadou Diallo

6 May 2023 5	Cape Town Tigers (South Africa)	80–70	(Uganda) City Oilers	6th of October
16:00	Scoring by quarter: 20–17, 17–20, 26–19, 17–14
	Pts: Cele 28; Rebs: Gbinije, Cele 8 Asts: Prinsloo 6	Livestats	Pts: Jones 27; Rebs: Jones, Justice Jr. 8 Asts: Dribela, Justice Jr. 4	Arena: Hassan Moustafa Sports Hall; Attendance: 696; Referees: Tyler Mirkovich, Wael Ibrahim Mostafa, Hassan Kamate

== Player statistics ==
Legend
GP	Games played	GS	Games started	MPG	Minutes per game
FG%	Field-goal percentage	3P%	3-point field-goal percentage	FT%	Free-throw percentage
RPG	Rebounds per game	APG	Assists per game	SPG	Steals per game
BPG	Blocks per game	PPG	Points per game

After all games.

City Oilers statistics
Player	GP	MPG	FG%	3FG%	FT%	RPG	APG	SPG	BPG	PPG
Falando Jones	5	32.9	.456	.448	.742	6.4	2.4	1.2	0.2	21.6
James Justice Jr.	5	34.6	.395	.280	1.000	5.4	3.6	1.2	0.0	19.0
Germaine Roebuck	5	28.0	.444	.286	.278	7.6	2.2	1.6	0.0	13.0
Tonny Drileba	3	17.9	.385	.385	1.000	2.7	1.7	1.7	0.0	5.7
Titus Odeke	5	21.3	.370	.429	.167	3.0	1.2	0.0	0.4	5.4
Jimmy Enabu	5	17.4	.375	.250	.143	1.8	1.4	0.6	0.0	3.0
Fayed Baale	5	11.4	.182	.167	.600	1.6	1.2	0.2	0.0	2.8
Ngor Barnaba	5	13.1	.313	.222	.500	3.2	0.6	0.0	0.2	2.8
Segune Obe	5	7.1	.250	.000	.500	0.8	0.0	0.2	0.0	1.6
Abdihakim Ghedi	4	9.1	.250	.000	.667	2.8	0.0	0.0	0.8	1.5
James Okello	5	14.2	.143	.000	.667	2.0	0.8	0.4	0.0	1.2
Edrine Walujjo	2	1.8	.000	.000	.000	0.0	0.0	0.0	0.0	0.0
Ivan Muhwezi	2	3.0	.000	.000	.000	0.5	0.5	0.0	0.0	0.0
