= A'Darius Pegues =

American basketball player

Free agent
- Position: Center
- League: Rwandan League

Personal information
- Born: March 21, 1988 (age 38) Fayetteville, North Carolina
- Listed height: 6 ft 10 in (2.08 m)
- Listed weight: 245 lb (111 kg)

Career information
- High school: Western Alamance (Elon, North Carolina)
- College: Indiana–Southeast (2009–2010); Tarleton State (2012–2013); Campbellsville (2013–2014)
- NBA draft: 2015: undrafted
- Playing career: 2014–present

Career history
- 2014: Bowling Green Hornets
- 2014: Iskra Svit
- 2014: Saldus
- 2014–2015: Abejas de Guanajuato
- 2016–2017: Pioneros de Los Mochis
- 2017: City Oilers
- 2018–2019: Leones de Managua
- 2019: Patriots

A'Darius Lamar Pegues (born March 21, 1988) is an American-born Ugandan basketball player who last played for Patriots BBC in the Rwanda Basketball League. Standing at 6 ft 10 in (2.08 m), he plays as center.

== Career ==
In November 2019, Pegues signed with Rwandan club Patriots BBC to play in the qualifying tournament for the Basketball Africa League (BAL). Pegues and the Patriots managed to qualify.

Pegues represented Uganda at the 2017 AfroBasket in Tunisia and Senegal, where he recorded the most rebounds for his team.

== See also ==
- Henry Malinga
- Ivan Muhwezi
- Stanley Ocitti
- James Okello
