= Ivan Lumanyika =

Ugandan basketball player (born 1992)

City Oilers
- Position: Center

Personal information
- Born: June 28, 1992 (age 34) Masajja, Uganda

Career information
- Playing career: 2015–present

Career history
- 2015: UCU Canons
- 2018–2019: JKL Dolphins
- 2019–present: City Oilers

Ivan Lumanyika Jumba (born June 28, 1992) is a Ugandan professional basketball player for the City Oilers.

== International career ==
Lumanyika represents Uganda in international competitions. He helped the team qualify for its first-ever AfroBasket, leading them past the preliminary rounds. Alongside teammate Henry Malinga, he guided Uganda to an 85–74 victory over Somalia on September 21, 2014. Against Kenya, he recorded 15 points and 11 rebounds. On July 6, 2015, he was named to the 20-man preliminary squad for the AfroBasket 2015.

== Personal ==
Lumanyika is left-handed.
