= Paul Odong =

Ugandan basketball player

Namuwongo Blazers
- Position: Shooting guard
- League: National Basketball League

Personal information
- Born: October 3, 1991 (age 35)

Career information
- College: Makerere University Business School
- Playing career: 2010–present

Career history
- 2010–: Bush Court
- Power
- 2020–: Namuwongo Blazers

Paul Odong (born 3 October 1991) is a Ugandan professional basketball player who plays as a guard for Namuwongo Blazers in the Uganda basketball League.

== Early life ==
Odong began playing basketball in high school and became more active in the sport in 2010 while studying at Makerere University Business School (MUBS). He played pickup games at Bush Court, where he developed his skills and began his basketball career. Odong later studied Business Computing and obtained a Master of Business Administration.

== Personal life ==
Odong is married to Maureen and has a family that has supported his basketball career. Outside basketball, he works in Uganda's financial sector and has been involved in community initiatives through Namuwongo Blazers.

== Club career ==
Odong began his basketball career with Bush Court in 2010, initially playing as a shooting guard.

In 2013, he joined Power Basketball Club. In 2019 to 2020 Odong joined Namuwongo Blazers from Power. He was part of the club's rise in Uganda's top-flight league.

In 2025, Odong continued to play for Namuwongo Blazers as captain and was part of the team that won the Uganda National Basketball League championship.

== See also ==
- Uganda men's national basketball team
- National Basketball League (Uganda)
- Namuwongo Blazers
