= 2022 NBL Uganda season =

- League: NBL Uganda
- Sport: Basketball
- Duration: March 11, 2022 – October 15, 2022

Regular season
- Top seed: Namuwongo Blazers
- Season MVP: Tonny Drileba (City Oilers)
- Top scorer: Mabor Makol (JKL Dolphins)

Playoffs
- Playoffs MVP: James Okello (City Oilers)

Finals
- Champions: City Oilers (8th title)
- Runners-up: Namuwongo Blazers

Seasons
- ← 2019 2023 →

The 2022 NBL Uganda season was the 26th season of the National Basketball League of Uganda, organised by the FUBA. The season began on March 11, 2022 and ended on October 15, 2022.

It was the return of the NBL after a 2-year hiatus due to the COVID-19 pandemic in Uganda. This season, the licensing requirements were changed and all teams had to be registered and run professionally.

The City Oilers won their 8th consecutive national championship, after edging Nam Blazers 4–3 in the finals of the playoffs.

== Regular season ==
The regular season began on March 11, 2022. All teams played each other twice, once home and once away.

Pos	2022 NBL season									
Pos	Team	Pld	W	L	PF	PA	PD	Pts	Home	Away
1	Namuwongo Blazers	24	19	5	1775	1447	+332	43	11–1	8–4
2	UCU Canons	24	19	5	1661	1376	+285	43	11–1	8–4
3	City Oilers	24	19	5	1917	1478	+439	43	5–2	14–3
4	KIU Titans	24	15	9	1690	1615	+75	39	8–4	7–5
5	Betway Power	24	15	9	1636	1611	+25	39	8–4	7–5
6	UPDF Tomahawks	24	13	11	1668	1504	+164	37	4–6	9–5
7	JKL Dolphins	24	11	13	1503	1566	–63	35	3–9	8–4
8	KCCA Panthers	24	11	13	1564	1584	–20	35	7–5	4–8
9	Our Savior	24	11	13	1504	1555	–51	35	7–6	4–7
10	Ndejje Angels	24	10	14	1724	1780	–56	34	6–7	4–7
11	Tropical Royals	24	8	16	1617	1902	–185	32	3–11	5–5
12	Victoria University-Sharing	24	5	19	1384	1659	–275	29	4–11	1–8
13	Falcons	24	0	24	1347	1913	–566	24	0–12	0–12

Qualify to Playoffs
Relegation to Division 1

== Playoffs ==
The playoffs began on August 26.

Quarterfinals
1	Namuwongo Blazers	2
8	KCCA Panthers	0
4	KIU Titans	2
5	Power	0
2	UCU Canons	0
7	JKL Dolphins	2
3	City Oilers	2
6	UPDF Tomahawks	0

Semifinals
1	Namuwongo Blazers	3
4	KIU Titans	0
7	JKL Dolphins	3
3	City Oilers	1

Finals
1	Namuwongo Blazers	3
3	City Oilers	4

== Statistics ==
Note: Players that played at least 50% of the team's 24 games are included.

Category	Player	Team(s)	Statistic	Played
Points per game	Saidi Amisi	Namuwongo Blazers	16.0	19
Rebounds per game	Mabor Makol	JKL Dolphins	13.4	22
Assists per game	Jimmy Enabu	City Oilers	4.7	22
Steals per game	Brian Namake	JKL Dolphins	4.0	13
Blocks per game	Mohammed Abdikani	KIU Titans	2.4	19

== Awards ==
On 3 April 2023, Tonny Drileba was named the league's Player of the Year by the Uganda Sports Press Association (USPA).
