= Omony =

Omony is a surname. Notable people with the surname include:

- Postnet Omony (born 1982), Ugandan footballer
- Stephen Omony (born 1981), Ugandan basketball player
- Sunday Omony, Ugandan-Canadian plus-size model and activist
