= Edrine Ekau =

No. 9 – Rezlife Saints
- Position: Forward-guard
- League: Uganda National Basketball League

Personal information
- Born: August 2, 2006 (age 20)
- Listed height: 1.96 m (6 ft 5 in)

Career information
- Playing career: 2026–present

Career history
- 2026–present: Rezlife Saints

Edrine Ekau (born 2 August 2006) a Uganda national basketball player who plays as a shooting guard for Namuwongo blazers and Rezlife saints in the Uganda national basketball team.

== Earl life. ==
Ekau was born on 2 August 2006. He represented Uganda's under-18 national basketball team, the Junior Silverbacks, at the 2024 FIBA Africa U18 Zone V Qualifiers, which were hosted in Kampala Uganda in June 2024.

== Club career. ==
Ekau began his senior club career with Rezlife Saints in Uganda's National Basketball League during the 2026 season. During his debut season, he averaged 18.7 points per game in the first round.

In October 2026, Ekau joined Namuwongo Blazers for the Road to the Basketball Africa League (BAL) qualifiers.

== International career ==
Ekau represented Uganda at the 2024 FIBA U18 Afro Basket Zone 5 qualifiers, He subsequently competed at the 2024 FIBA U18 Afro Basket in South Africa, averaging 6.2 points and 6.6 rebounds per game.

In 2026, Ekau was named in Uganda's men's national basketball team, the Silverbacks, for the FIBA Basketball World Cup 2027 African qualifiers.

== See also ==
- 2027 FIBA Basketball World Cup
