= 2023 NBL Uganda season =

- League: NBL Uganda
- Sport: Basketball
- Duration: 19 March – 25 October 2023

Regular season
- Top seed: City Oilers
- Season MVP: Titus Lual (City Oilers)
- Top scorer: Peter Cheng (Nam Blazers)

Playoffs
- Playoffs MVP: Jimmy Enabu (City Oilers)

Finals
- Champions: City Oilers (9th title)
- Runners-up: KIU Titans

Seasons
- ← 2022 2024 →

The 2023 NBL Uganda season was the 27th season of the National Basketball League of Uganda, organised by the FUBA. The season began on 19 March and ended on 25 October 2023.

The City Oilers won a record-extending 9th consecutive national championship, after edging the KIU Titans 4–2 in the finals of the playoffs. The season was marked by the withdrawal of second-seeded Namuwongo Blazers ahead of the playoffs.

== Team changes ==
▲ Promoted from 2022 Division 1	▼ Relegated from 2022 NBL Uganda season
Kampala Rockets; Rezlife Saints	Tropical Royals; Victoria University-Sharing; Falcons

== Regular season ==
The regular season began on 19 March and ended 10 September 2023. The Namuwongo Blazers withdrew from the league ahead of the playoffs as a protest by the federation's decision that the winner of the previous season had already qualified for the 2024 BAL qualification.

=== Standings ===
Pos	Team	Pld	W	L	Qualification or relegation
1	City Oilers	22	21	1	Qualification to playoffs
2	Namuwongo Blazers	22	17	5	Withdrew
3	KIU Titans	22	17	5	Qualification to playoffs
4	Betway Power BC	22	13	9	Qualification to playoffs
5	UCU Canons	20	10	10	Qualification to playoffs
6	Our Saviour	22	9	13	Qualification to playoffs
7	KCCA Panthers	22	8	14	Qualification to playoffs
8	Ndejje University Angels	22	8	14	Qualification to playoffs
9	Kampala Rockets	22	8	14	Qualification to playoffs
10	JKL Dolphins	22	8	14	
11	UPDF Tomahawks (R)	22	7	15	Relegated to Division 2
12	Rezlife Saints (R)	22	6	16	Relegated to Division 2

Source: Afrobasket.com
(R) Relegated

=== Results ===
Home \ Away	COB	JKL	KAM	KCC	KIU	NAM	NDE	OUR	POW	REZ	UCU	UPD
City Oilers	—	74–62	94–68	72–54	80–72	57–51	80–88		85–55	84–41	87–64	87–53
City Oilers	—	80–60										
JKL Dolphins		—	71–80	91–81	64–76	68–77	72–74	80–79	71–60	77–68	53–68	70–57
JKL Dolphins		—										
Kampala Rockets	45–58	66–70	—	58–71	61–57	39–81	75–97	69–95	67–84		69–74	75–68
Kampala Rockets			—								85–78	
KCCA Panthers	50–75	78–69	72–65	—		42–76	102–99	65–74	67–74	87–81	80–90	77–72
KCCA Panthers				—								
KIU Titans	51–79	59–44	78–53	84–71	—	74–69	89–72	72–62		74–54	68–69	100–51
KIU Titans				75–45	—		101–84					
Namuwongo Blazers	52–72	71–62	103–70	89–69	68–57	—		65–57	52–48	62–88	77–87	62–49
Namuwongo Blazers						—						
Ndejje Angels	57–79	63–66	48–62	71–69		55–76	—	99–98	62–88	63–65		66–62
Ndejje Angels						48–75	—					
Our Savior	51–88	74–77	63–51	73–72	77–78	53–66	65–53	—	66–73	64–47		60–53
Our Savior	61–84							—				
Power	49–106	74–52	53–55	84–80	53–68	60–63	68–59	63–55	—	83–81		62–66
Power									—			
Rezlife Saints	55–88	57–55	57–71	48–70	65–84	56–85	90–88	67–76		—	35–87	54–48
Rezlife Saints			72–81							—		
UCU Canons	71–79	57–41			55–73	47–66	55–64	55–61	81–50	72–60	—	53–61
UCU Canons							82–89	67–66	0–20		—	53–57
UPDF Tomahawks	50–75	68–54	63–45	58–62	58–64	51–67	72–59	66–63	53–60	48–49		—
UPDF Tomahawks												—

Source: Afrobasket.com
Legend: Blue = home team win; Yellow = draw; Red = away team win.

== Playoffs ==
The playoffs began on 16 September and ended 25 October 2023.

Quarterfinals
1	City Oilers	2
9	Kampala Rockets	0
8	Ndejje Angels	1
6	Our Saviour	2
3	KIU Titans	2
7	KCCA Panthers	0
4	Betway Power	1
5	UCU Canons	2

Semifinals
1	City Oilers	3
6	Our Saviour	0
3	KIU Titans	3
5	UCU Canons	0

Finals
1	City Oilers	4
3	KIU Titans	2
