= Peter Obleng =

Ugandan basketball player (born 2003)

Namuwongo Blazers
- Position: Small forward / Power forward
- League: NBL Uganda

Personal information
- Born: 2nd/february/2003
- Listed height: 6 ft 5 in (1.96 m)

Career information
- High school: Buddo Secondary School (Buddo, Uganda)
- College: Kampala International University
- Playing career: 2019–present

Career history
- 2019–2022: KIU Titans
- 2022: Urunani BBC
- 2022–2023: Namuwongo Blazers
- 2023–2024: KIU Titans
- 2024: Fox Basketball Club
- 2025–present: Namuwongo Blazers

Career highlights
- NBL Uganda champion (2025); Viva Basketball League champion (2022)

Peter Obleng (born 2 February 2003) is a Ugandan basketball player who plays as a forward for Namuwongo Blazers.

== Early life ==
Obleng began playing basketball in 2016 and attended Buddo Secondary School, where he was part of the team that won the East Africa Secondary School Championships in 2018 and 2019. He joined KIU Titans in 2020 after completing his time at Buddo.

== Club career ==
In 2020, Obleng began his club career with KIU Titans in Uganda’s National Basketball League.In 2022 he joined Urunani BBC in Burundi during the Burundian championship.

In 2022–2023, he returned to Uganda and joined Namuwongo Blazers and later returned to KIU Titans for the 2023 season.

In 2024, Obleng represented Fox Basketball Club (South Sudan) in the 2024 Road to BAL competition, appearing in one game.

In 2025, he returned to Namuwongo and participated in the 2025 Road to BAL, he averaged 14.3 points, 2.3 rebounds and 1.3 assists per game.

=== Career statistics ===
| year | club | competition | apps | PPG |
|---|---|---|---|---|
| 2024 | Fox basketball | Road to BAL 2025 | 1 | 4.0 |
| 2025 | Namuwongo Blazers | Road to BAL2026 | 4 | 14.3 |

== See also ==
- Namuwongo Blazers
- KIU Titans
- Urunani BBC
- Basketball Africa League
