= 2019 NBL Uganda season =

2019–20 NBL Uganda season
- League: NBL Uganda
- Sport: Basketball
- Duration: April 12 – November 24, 2019 (Regular season); November 27, 2019 – January 19, 2020 (Playoffs)
- Teams: 12

Regular season
- Top seed: UCU Canons
- Season MVP: Landry Ndikumana (City Oilers)
- Top scorer: Landry Ndikumana (City Oilers)

Playoffs
- Playoffs MVP: James Okello (City Oilers)
- Finals champions: City Oilers (7th title)
- Runners-up: UCU Canons

Seasons
- ← 2018 2022 →

The 2019–20 NBL Uganda season was the 25th season of the National Basketball League of Uganda, organised by the FUBA. The season began on April 12, 2019, and ended on January 19, 2020.

The City Oilers won their seventh consecutive NBL title, after beating UCU Canons in the playoff finals. They qualified for the 2021 BAL qualification tournaments. Landry Ndikumana was the league MVP and top scorer James Okello was named Playoffs MVP.

== Regular season ==
The regular season began on March 11, 2022. All teams played each other twice, once home and once away.

| Pos | 2022 NBL season | | | | | | | | | |
| Pos | Team | Pld | W | L | PF | PA | PD | Pts | Home | Away |
|---|---|---|---|---|---|---|---|---|---|---|
| 1 | UCU Canons | 22 | 19 | 3 | 1671 | 1295 | +332 | 41 | 9–1 | 10–2 |
| 2 | City Oilers | 22 | 19 | 3 | 1819 | 1283 | +285 | 41 | 10–1 | 9–2 |
| 3 | Warriors | 22 | 18 | 4 | 1680 | 1250 | +439 | 40 | 9–2 | 9–2 |
| 4 | Power | 22 | 15 | 7 | 1795 | 1443 | +25 | 37 | 6–4 | 9–3 |
| 5 | JKL Dolphins | 22 | 15 | 7 | 1492 | 1426 | +75 | 37 | 6–6 | 9–1 |
| 6 | KIU Titans | 22 | 13 | 9 | 1464 | 1404 | +164 | 35 | 7–5 | 6–4 |
| 7 | Ndejje Angels | 22 | 11 | 11 | 1485 | 1530 | –63 | 33 | 5–6 | 6–5 |
| 8 | KCCA Panthers | 22 | 7 | 15 | 1464 | 1596 | –20 | 29 | 3–8 | 4–7 |
| 9 | Sharing Youth | 22 | 6 | 16 | 1391 | 1596 | –51 | 28 | 3–8 | 3–8 |
| 10 | Falcons | 22 | 4 | 18 | 1287 | 1768 | –56 | 26 | 2–9 | 2–9 |
| 11 | Kampala University Eagles | 22 | 3 | 19 | 1360 | 1857 | –185 | 25 | 2–9 | 1–10 |
| 12 | Our Savior | 22 | 2 | 20 | 1281 | 1741 | –275 | 24 | 1–10 | 1–10 |

Qualify to Playoffs
Relegation to Division 1

== Playoffs ==
The playoffs were played between two teams in a best-of-seven series the UCU Canons and the City Oilers.

=== Bracket ===
Semifinals
1 | UCU Canons | 3
4 | Power | 1
2 | City Oilers | 3
3 | Warriors | 1

Finals
1 | UCU Canons | 3
2 | City Oilers | 4
Third place
3 | Warriors | 89
4 | Power | 75

=== Finals ===
November 27
8:30 p.m.

Report

UCU Canons 67, City Oilers 59

MTN Arena, Kampala

November 29
6:30 p.m.

Report

City Oilers 79, UCU Canons 72

MTN Arena, Kampala

December 1
6:30 p.m.

Report

UCU Canons 69, City Oilers 79

MTN Arena, Kampala

January 10
7:30 p.m.

Report

City Oilers 63, UCU Canons 57

MTN Arena, Kampala

January 15
7:30 p.m.

Report

UCU Canons 54, City Oilers 52

MTN Arena, Kampala

January 17
7:45 p.m.

Report

City Oilers 73, UCU Canons 78

MTN Arena, Kampala

January 19
7:00 pm

Report

UCU Canons 57, City Oilers 72
City Oilers win series 4–3

MTN Arena, Kampala
