= Titus Odeke =

Ugandan basketball player (born 1998)

Titus Lual Odeke
City Oilers
- Position: Power forward
- League: National Basketball League

Personal information
- Born: December 29, 1998 (age 27) Uganda

Career information
- College: Uganda Christian University
- Playing career: 2019–present

Career history
- 2019–2022: UCU Canons
- 2023–present: City Oilers
- 2021–present: Uganda

Career highlights
- National Basketball League MVP (2023); National Basketball League MVP and Best Defensive Player (2024); Fortebet Real Stars Basketball Award (2022); Fortebet Real Stars Monthly Basketball Award (November 2023)

Titus Odeke also known as Titus Lual Odeke (born 29th December, 1998) a Ugandan basketball player who plays as a power forward playing for UCU Canons and City Oilers in Uganda National basketball league.

== Early life and education background ==
Titus was born on 29th December, 1998 in Uganda. He attended Uganda Christian University (UCU), where he played basketball for the UCU Canons.

== Club career ==
Titus began his basketball career with UCU Canons from 2019 to 2022, where he served as the team captain and also represented Uganda Christian University at the 2022 FISU 3×3 World Cup.

In January 2023, he moved from UCU Canons to City Oilers, where he represented the club in domestic and African club competitions, including the Road to BAL.

== International career ==
Titus represents the Silverbacks a Uganda national basketball team. He was included in Uganda's provisional squad for the FIBA Afro Basket 2021 Qualifiers making three appearances during the qualifying campaign. He represented Uganda in the 2023 FIBA Basketball World Cup African Qualifiers, where he made three appearances and in 2026, he continued to represent Uganda in the FIBA Basketball World Cup 2027 African Qualifiers, playing against Angola, Mali and Egypt.

== Awards ==
In May 2022, Titus was nominated for the Forte bet Real Stars Monthly Award in the basketball category for his performance in April; however, the award was won by his university teammate, Jerry Kayanga. He won the Forte bet Real Stars Monthly Award for basketball in December 2023, following his performances throughout November.

== See also ==
- James Okello
- Jalen Watson
- Ivan Muhwezi
