= Edgar Munaba =

Ugandan basketball player (born 1999)

No. 13 – City Oilers
- Position: Small forward / Forward
- League: Ugandan NBL

Personal information
- Born: 1 May 1999 (age 27) Uganda
- Listed height: 196 cm (6 ft 5 in)

Career information
- High school: Harding Christian Academy; Seeta High School
- College: Kampala International University
- Playing career: 2022–present

Career history
- 2022–2024: KIU Titans
- 2025–present: City Oilers

Edgar Munaba (born May 1, 1999) is a Ugandan basketball player who plays as a power forward for the City Oilers of the Uganda National Basketball League (NBL).

== Early Life. ==
Munaba attended Harding Christian Academy in Jinja for his Ordinary Level secondary studies. He got a sports scholarship to complete his Advanced Level education at Seeta High School in Mukono where he led the school's basketball team in 2017 to 2019,

In 2021, Munaba joined Kampala International University (KIU) to pursue a Bachelor of International Business. He joined the university's basketball program (KIU Titans) He stated that his career was inspired by his mother and Kobe Bryant an American basketball player.

== Club career. ==
Munaba began his prominent NBL club career after being recruited to the Kampala International University team (KIU Titans) in 2022 to 2024.

In 2025, he joined the city oilers during 2026 NBL campaign, appearing in 32 games and averaging 17.1 minutes per game.

== International career. ==
Munaba made his debut for Uganda's senior men's national basketball team, the Silverbacks, during the 2025 FIBA AfroBasket qualification campaign in February 2024. He was subsequently listed in Uganda's squad for the 2027 FIBA Basketball World Cup African qualifiers.
