= Allawi Ssenkubuge =

Ugandan basketball player (born 2002)

No. 20 – City Oilers
- Position: Small forward / shooting guard
- League: NBL Uganda; BAL

Personal information
- Born: 24 August 2002 (age 24) Kampala, Uganda
- Listed height: 1.88 m (6 ft 2 in)

Career information
- Playing career: 2021–present

Career history
- 2021–present: City Oilers

Career highlights
- 3× NBL Uganda champion (2022–2024)

Allawi Ssenkubuge (born 24 August 2002) is a Ugandan professional basketball player who plays for the City Oilers of the National Basketball League (NBL).

== Early life ==
Ssenkubuge was born on 24 August 2002 in Kampala, Uganda. He came through the youth ranks of the Federation of Uganda Basketball Associations (FUBA), featuring in trials for the Uganda under-16 national basketball team.

== Club career ==
Ssenkubuge joined the City Oilers in 2021 and came through as one of the club's young prospects. A guard/forward standing 1.88 m (6 ft 2 in), he has been described as one of the most underrated talents in the NBL, noted for his explosive speed and offensive ability. He wears jersey number 20 for the Oilers.

With the Oilers, Ssenkubuge has won three consecutive NBL championships (2022, 2023 and 2024), part of the club's record run of ten league titles. He has also been part of the Oilers' squads in the Road to BAL, including the 2025 edition.

== International career ==
Ssenkubuge featured for Uganda at under-16 level.

== Career statistics ==
=== NBL Uganda ===
Season	Team	GP	MPG	PPG	RPG	APG	SPG
2026	City Oilers	20	13.3	4.5	2.0	0.9	1.1

Source: Latinbasket. Retrieved 16 October 2026.

== Achievements and honors ==
=== Club ===
- 3× NBL Uganda champion: 2022, 2023, 2024 (with City Oilers)

== See also ==
- City Oilers
- National Basketball League (Uganda)
- Basketball in Uganda
