= 2024 NBL Uganda season =

- League: NBL Uganda
- Sport: Basketball
- Duration: 26 January – 3 September 2024

Regular season
- Top seed: City Oilers
- Season MVP: Titus Lual (City Oilers)
- Top scorer: Peter Cheng (Nam Blazers)

Playoffs

Finals
- Champions: City Oilers (10th title)
- Runners-up: KIU Titans

Seasons
- ← 2023 2025 →

The 2024 NBL Uganda season is the 28th season of the National Basketball League of Uganda, organized by the FUBA. The season began on 26 January 2024 with the regular season, and finished on 3 September 2024, with the City Oilers winning their record-extending 10th straight title. They went 30–1 for the season, sweeping all their three playoff opponent, including KIU Titans in the finals. The Oilers' Titus Lual was named both MVP and the league's Best Defensive Player.

== Team changes ==
JT Jaguars and Livingstone were promoted as the two finalists of the FUBA Division 1.

▲ Promoted from 2023 FUBA Division 1	▼ Relegated from 2023 NBL Uganda season
JT Jaguars; Livingstone	UPDF Tomahawks; Rezlife Saints

== Regular season ==
=== Standings ===
Pos	Team	Pld	W	L	PF	PA	PD	Qualification or relegation
1	City Oilers	22	21	1	1722	1256	+466	Qualification to playoffs
2	KIU Titans	22	17	5	1628	1322	+306	Qualification to playoffs
3	Namuwongo Blazers	22	16	6	1650	1510	+140	Qualification to playoffs
4	UCU Canons	22	12	10	1498	1396	+102	Qualification to playoffs
5	KCCA Panthers	22	12	10	1588	1560	+28	Qualification to playoffs
6	Our Saviour	22	11	11	1402	1413	−11	Qualification to playoffs
7	JT Jaguars	22	10	12	1395	1478	−83	Qualification to playoffs
8	Kampala Rockets	22	8	14	1433	1549	−116	Qualification to playoffs
9	Livingstone	22	8	14	1316	1502	−186	
10	JKL Dolphins	22	8	14	1444	1595	−151	
11	Power (R)	22	6	16	1436	1606	−170	Relegated to Division 2
12	Ndejje Angels (R)	22	3	19	1396	1721	−325	Relegated to Division 2

Source: Afrobasket, FUBA
(R) Relegated

== Playoffs ==
Quarterfinals
1	City Oilers	2
8	Kampala Rockets	0
4	UCU Canons	2
5	KCCA Panthers	0
2	KIU Titans	2
7	JT Jaguars	0
3	Namuwongo Blazers	2
6	Our Saviour	0

Semifinals
1	City Oilers	3
4	UCU Canons	0
2	KIU Titans	3
3	Namuwongo Blazers	2

Finals
1	City Oilers	4
2	KIU Titans	0

== Statistics ==
Source: FUBA.

Category	Player	Team(s)	Statistic
Points per game	Peter Cheng	Namuwongo Blazers	14.4
Rebounds per game	Puati Ozias Kikomba	Kampala Rockets	13.3
Assists per game	Joel Lukoji	KIU Titans	6.5
Steals per game	Joel Lukoji	KIU Titans	2.8
Blocks per game	Puati Ozias Kikomba	Kampala Rockets	2.0
