= Landry Ndikumana (basketball) =

Burundian basketball player (born 1995)

No. 14 – Urunani
- Position: Small forward
- League: Road to BAL

Personal information
- Born: 14 February 1995 (age 31)
- Listed height: 1.98 m (6 ft 6 in)
- Listed weight: 110 kg (243 lb)

Career history
- Urunani
- 2015–2021: City Oilers
- 2021–present: Urunani
- 2021: →New Star
- 2023: →Pazi
- 2024–present: Remesha

Career highlights
- NBL Uganda MVP (2019); NBL Uganda Playoffs MVP (2018); 2× NBL Uganda Top Scorer (2019, 2020); 6× NBL Uganda champion (2015–2019); 4× VBL champion (2013, 2014, 2022, 2024); 2× FIBA Zone 5 Championship winner (2013, 2014); 2× FIBA Zone 5 Championship MVP (2013, 2014); EABCC champion (2024); EABCC All-Star Team (2024)

Landry Ndikumana Dukure (born 14 February 1995) is a Burundian basketball player for Pazi and the Burundi national team. He is a 1.98 m (6 ft 6 in) tall small forward and has played professionally in Burundi, Uganda and Tanzania. Ndikumana was the NBL Uganda MVP and Playoffs MVP in the 2019 season.

== Career ==
Ndikumana started his career with Burundian team Urunani and impressed in the FIBA Zone V Championships, winning MVP twice in a row, in 2013 and 2014. He also won the Burundian League in these years.

From 2015, Ndikumana played for the City Oilers in Uganda and has been one of the most prominent players on the team. Ndikumana garnered regular season MVP honours in 2017, and won Playoffs MVP in 2018.

In October 2021, he was on the roster of New Star BBC on loan from Urunani for the 2022 BAL Qualifying Tournaments.

In September 2023, Ndikumana played for Tanzanian club Pazi in the 2024 BAL qualification.

In December 2024, Ndikumana played with Remesha in the East Africa Basketball Championship Cup (EABCC) and won the inaugural championship. He was named to the tournament's All-Star Team.
