= Ajah Akuak =

South Sudanese basketball player (born 2001)

Personal information
- Born: June 18, 2001 (age 25)

Career history
- 2023: Nile Legends
- 2025–present: Magic Stormers Kampala

Ajah Akuak (born June 18, 2001) is a South Sudanese basketball player. She currently competes for the Magic Stormers Kampala in the Ugandan National Basketball League and has represented East African clubs in the FIBA Africa Women's Basketball League qualifiers.

== Career ==
Akuak debuted in East African basketball playing for the Nile Legends, a South Sudanese club. She competed in the 2023 FIBA Africa Women's Basketball League Zone Five qualifiers hosted in Rwanda, where she was a leading offensive player for the team. Throughout the tournament, Akuak averaged a double-double across four games, recording 12.8 points and 10.5 rebounds per game.

In 2025, Akuak transferred to the Magic Stormers Kampala to compete in the Ugandan National Basketball League. She represented the Stormers during the 2025 FIBA Women's Basketball League Africa Qualifiers.

=== Club History ===
Nile Legends (South Sudan): 2023

Magic Stormers Kampala (Uganda): 2025–Present
