= East Africa Basketball Championship Cup =

- Current season, competition or edition: #2024 season
- Sport: Basketball
- Founded: 2024
- First season: 2024
- No. of teams: 6
- Region: East Africa
- Confederation: FIBA Africa
- Most recent champion: (Burundi) Les Hippos (1st title) (2025)
- Most titles: (Burundi) Remesha (Burundi) Les Hippos (1 title)

The East Africa Basketball Championship Cup (EABCC) is an annual basketball tournament for men's teams in East Africa, organized by FIBA Africa. The tournament was founded in 2024. The competition is open to teams in FIBA Africa Zone 5, similar to the previously organized FIBA Africa Zone 5 Club Championship, which ran for 33 years. The league was established by Zone 5 President Hesham El Hariri, with the aim of providing game for teams that did not qualify for the Road to BAL as national champions.

The inaugural season was held in December 2024 in Nairobi, Kenya, and existed of six teams. Remesha from Burundi were the inaugural champions.

== Format ==
Teams play in a round-robin format, with a total of 15 games. The team that finishes on top of the group is crowned champion.

== Seasons ==
=== 2024 season ===
The 2024 season was held at the Nyayo National Stadium in Nairobi, Kenya, and began on December 11, 2024. The first game in EABCC history was played between Remesha from Burundi and ABC from Tanzania.

Pos	Team	Pld	W	L	PF	PA	PD	Pts	REM	DAR	KPA	HIP	ABC	EQU
1	(Burundi) Remesha (C)	5	5	0	424	326	+98	10	—	77–58	81–74	76–55	84–75	106–64
2	(Tanzania) Dar City	5	4	1	360	313	+47	9	58–77	—	69–65	84–50	66–58	83–63
3	(Kenya) KPA	5	3	2	370	350	+20	8	71–81	65–69	—	76–63	85–82	73–55
4	(Burundi) Les Hippos	5	2	3	335	359	−24	7	55–76	50–84	63–76	—	97–72	70–51
5	(Tanzania) ABC	5	1	4	359	401	−42	6	75–84	58–66	82–85	72–97	—	72–69
6	(Kenya) Equity Dumas	5	0	5	302	404	−102	5	64–106	63–83	55–73	51–70	69–72	—

Source: FIBA
(C) Champions

=== 2025 season ===
Final standings
Pos.	Team
1	(Burundi) Les Hippos
2	(Kenya) Ulinzi Warriors
3	(Kenya) Umoja
4	(Kenya) KPA
5	(Ethiopia) Gambela City
6	(Tanzania) Stein Warriors

== Individual awards ==
=== Most Valuable Player ===
Season	Player	Team
2024	(United States) Nathaniel Brownlee	(Tanzania) Dar City
2025	(Burundi) Romis Bujeje	(Burundi) Les Hippos

=== All-Star Team ===
The All-Star Team is composed of the five best players of a given season.

Season	Player	Team
2024	(United States) Nathaniel Brownlee	(Burundi) Remesha
2024	(Burundi) Guibert Nijimbere	(Burundi) Remesha
2024	(Burundi) Landry Ndikumana	(Burundi) Remesha
2024	(Kenya) Salim Kisilu	(Kenya) KPA
2024	(Tanzania) Jonas Nishi	(Tanzania) ABC
2025	Robin Clark Dushime	Les Hippos
2025	Brans Nzioka	Ulinzi Warriors
2025	Faheem Juma	Umoja
2025	Romis Bujeje	Les Hippos
2025	Cisco George	Stein Warriors
