= Postnet (disambiguation) =

Postnet may refer to:

- POSTNET, United States Postal Service barcode
- PostNet (company), shipping and printing company
- Postnet Omony (born 1982), Ugandan football
