= Landry Ndikumana =

Landry Ndikumana may refer to:

- Landry Ndikumana (footballer)
- Landry Ndikumana (basketball)
