= Uganda men's national basketball team =

Uganda
- FIBA ranking: 80 ▼1 (1 September 2026)
- Joined FIBA: 1963
- FIBA zone: FIBA Africa
- National federation: Federation of Uganda Basketball Associations (FUBA)
- Coach: George Galanopoulos
- Nickname: Silverbacks

AfroBasket
- Appearances: 4
Home	Away

Former logo of the FUBA

The Uganda national basketball team also known as The Silverbacks represents Uganda in international basketball competitions. It is administered by the Federation of Uganda Basketball Associations (FUBA).

Uganda made its debut at the FIBA Africa Championship at its 2015 edition in Tunisia. There, Uganda beat Zimbabwe 72–64 to earn its first victory at the continent's prime tournament.

== Outlook ==
At the AfroBasket 2021 qualification, Uganda had group plays against Egypt, Morocco and Cape Verde.

At AfroBasket 2021 in Rwanda, Uganda had its best performance in history as it reached the quarter-finals where it eventually lost to Cape Verde.

== FIBA Africa Championship record ==
Year	Round	Position	GP	W	L
(Morocco) 1964	Did not qualify				
(Tunisia) 1965	Did not qualify				
(Morocco) 1968	Did not qualify				
(Egypt) 1970	Did not qualify				
(Senegal) 1972	Did not qualify				
(Central African Republic) 1974	Did not qualify				
(Egypt) 1975	Did not qualify				
(Senegal) 1978	Did not qualify				
(Morocco) 1980	Did not qualify				
(Somalia) 1981	Did not qualify				
(Egypt) 1983	Did not qualify				
(Ivory Coast) 1985	Did not qualify				
(Tunisia) 1987	Did not qualify				
(Angola) 1989	Did not qualify				
(Egypt) 1992	Did not qualify				
(Kenya) 1993	Did not qualify				
(Algeria) 1995	Did not qualify				
(Senegal) 1997	Did not qualify				
(Angola) 1999	Did not qualify				
(Morocco) 2001	Did not qualify				
(Egypt) 2003	Did not qualify				
(Algeria) 2005	Did not qualify				
(Angola) 2007	Did not qualify				
(Libya) 2009	Did not qualify				
(Madagascar) 2011	Did not qualify				
(Ivory Coast) 2013	Did not qualify				
(Tunisia) 2015	Round of 16	15th	5	1	4
(Tunisia) (Senegal) 2017	Preliminary round	13th	3	0	3
(Rwanda) 2021	Quarter-finals	6th	5	2	3
(Angola) 2025	Preliminary round	15th	3	0	3
Total			16	3	13

== Team ==
=== Current roster ===
Roster for the AfroBasket 2025.

Uganda men's national basketball team roster
Players
Coaches

Pos.	No.	Name	Age – Date of birth	Height	Club	Ctr.
G	0	Naseef Lubowa	20 – 20 December 2004	1.88 m (6 ft 2 in)	Brewster Academy	(United States)
SG	2	Tejan Rugette	17 – 16 October 2007	1.91 m (6 ft 3 in)	Lee Academy Prep	(United States)
SG	6	Robinson Opong (C)	36 – 10 May 1989	1.90 m (6 ft 3 in)	MBB Basketball	(South Africa)
SG	7	Ivan Muhwezi	27 – 19 January 1998	1.82 m (6 ft 0 in)	City Oilers	(Uganda)
PG	8	Fayed Baale	23 – 28 December 2001	1.73 m (5 ft 8 in)	Uganda Christian University	(Uganda)
C	9	Deng Geu	28 – 1 January 1997	2.06 m (6 ft 9 in)	Horsens IC	(Denmark)
C	11	Joel Kayira	24 – 31 March 2001	2.08 m (6 ft 10 in)	Uganda Christian University	(Uganda)
G	14	Emmanuel Wombala	25 – 20 January 2000	1.96 m (6 ft 5 in)	EN Baskets Schwelm	(Germany)
C	21	Jonathan Komagum	26 – 15 November 1998	2.05 m (6 ft 9 in)	London Lions	(United Kingdom)
F	24	Jacksen Moni	22 – 20 February 2003	2.01 m (6 ft 7 in)	North Dakota State Bison	(United States)

Head coach

- (United States) George Galanopoulos

Assistant coach(es)

- (Uganda) Mandy Juruni
- (Uganda) Andrew Senyondwa

Legend

- (C) Team captain
- Club – describes last
  club before the tournament
- Age – describes age
  on 12 August 2025

==== Depth chart ====
Pos.	Starting 5	Bench
C
PF
SF
SG
PG

=== Past rosters ===
Team for the 2017 FIBA Africa Championship.

Uganda men's national basketball team roster
Players
Coaches

Pos.	No.	Name	Age – Date of birth	Height	Club
G	4	Syrus Kiviiri	29 – 22 March 1988		Pemba Warriors	(Uganda)
PG	5	Jimmy Enabu	29 – 17 April 1988	6 ft 2 in (1.88 m)		(Uganda)
G/F	6	Robinson Opong	28 – 10 May 1989	6 ft 3 in (1.91 m)	Free agent
PF	7	James Okello	27 – 26 January 1990	6 ft 5 in (1.96 m)	City Oilers	(Uganda)
PG	8	Benjamin Komakech	31 – 28 April 1986	6 ft 2 in (1.88 m)	City Oilers	(Uganda)
F	9	Jonathan Egau	24 – 2 March 1993	6 ft 3 in (1.91 m)	UCU Canons	(Uganda)
G	10	Jonah Otim	23 – 10 January 1994	6 ft 4 in (1.93 m)	City Oilers	(Uganda)
F/C	11	Samuel Kalwanyi	22 – 20 May 1995	6 ft 7 in (2.01 m)	Wayland Baptist Pioneers	(United States)
SF	12	Stephen Omony (C)	37 – 23 March 1980	6 ft 5 in (1.96 m)	City Oilers	(Uganda)
C	13	A'Darius Pegues	29 – 21 March 1988	6 ft 10 in (2.08 m)	Pioneros de Los Mochis	(Mexico)
F	14	Joseph Ikong	31 – 28 September 1985	6 ft 4 in (1.93 m)	Tiger Head Power	(Uganda)
PF	15	Stanley Ocitti	37 – 28 May 1980	6 ft 8 in (2.03 m)	City Oilers	(Uganda)

Head coach

- (United States) George Galanopoulous

Assistant coach(es)

- (Uganda) Mandy Juruni

Legend

- Club – describes last
  club before the tournament
- Age – describes age
  on 8 September 2017

Team for the 2015 FIBA Africa Championship.

Uganda men's national basketball team roster
Players
Coaches

Pos.	No.	Name	Age – Date of birth	Height	Club
PF	4	Stanley Ocitti	35 – 28 May 1980	6 ft 9 in (2.06 m)	Aomori Watts	(Japan)
SG	5	Jimmy Enabu	27 – 17 April 1988	6 ft 3 in (1.91 m)	City Oilers	(Uganda)
SF	7	Joseph Ikong	29 – 28 September 1985	6 ft 5 in (1.96 m)	Tigerhead Power Basketball	(Uganda)
PG	8	Josh Johnson	22 – 20 September 1992		Ipswich Basketball	(United Kingdom)
SG	9	Samuel Mukooza	25 – 4 December 1989	6 ft 5 in (1.96 m)	Östberga Basket	(Sweden)
PG	10	Kassim Nagwere	25 – 23 June 1990	6 ft 3 in (1.91 m)	Fryshuset Basket	(Sweden)
PF	11	Samuel Kalwanyi	20 – 20 May 1995	6 ft 7 in (2.01 m)	City Oilers	(Uganda)
SF	12	Stephen Omwony	35 – 23 March 1980	6 ft 4 in (1.93 m)	Falcons Basketball Club	(Singapore)
C	13	Dhal Marial	27 – 24 April 1988	7 ft 3 in (2.21 m)
C	14	Henry Malinga	36 – 4 April 1979	6 ft 5 in (1.96 m)	Riham Warriors	(Uganda)
C	15	Brandon Sebirumbi	25 – 15 May 1990	6 ft 9 in (2.06 m)	Cáceres Ciudad del Baloncesto	(Spain)

Head coach

- (Uganda) Mandy Juruni

Assistant coach(es)

- (Uganda) Omar Ba Rajab

Legend

- Club – describes last
  club before the tournament
- Age – describes age
  on 20 August 2015

=== Head coach position ===
- (Uganda) Timothy Odeke : 2007–2009
- (Uganda) Mandy Juruni : 2015–2017
- (United States) George Galanopoulos : 2017 -
- (Uganda) Mandy Juruni : 2018–
- (Uganda) Andrew Tendo (interim) : February 2023

== See also ==
- Uganda women's national basketball team
- Uganda national under-19 basketball team
- Uganda women's national under-19 basketball team
