= Andrew Tendo =

Ugandan basketball player and coach

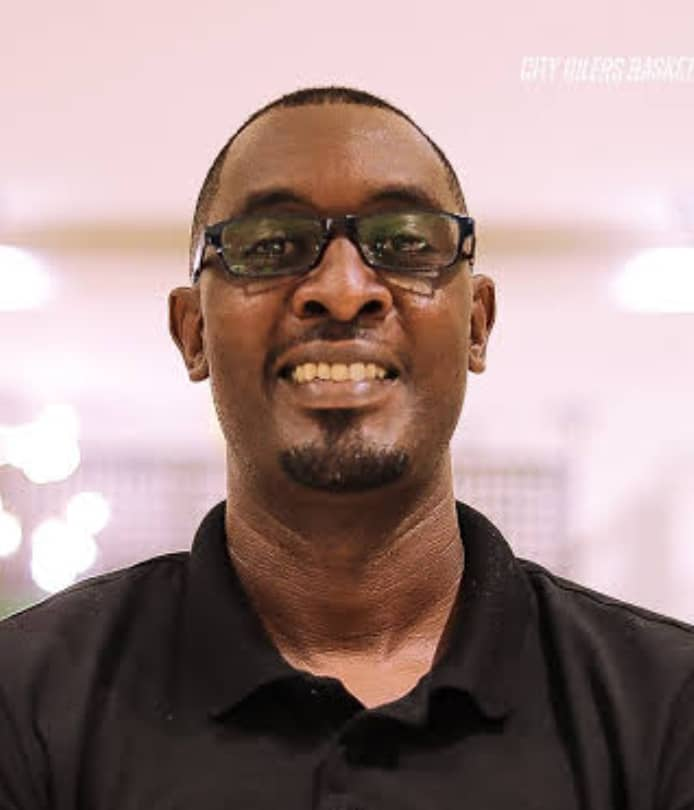

City Oilers
- Position: Head coach
- League: NBL; BAL

Personal information
- Born: 22 July 1979 (age 47)

Career information
- Playing career: 1999–2016
- Coaching career: 2016–present

Career history

Playing
- 1999–2007: Falcons
- City Oilers

Coaching
- 2016–2023: City Oilers (assistant)
- 2023: Uganda U16 (head coach)
- 2023–present: Uganda (assistant)
- 2024–present: City Oilers (head coach)

Career highlights
- As player: 5× NBL champion (1998, 1999, 2002–2004); As assistant coach: 6× NBL champion (2016–2019, 2022, 2023)

Andrew Tendo Senyondwa (born 22 July 1979) is a Ugandan professional basketball coach and former player. He is the current head coach of the City Oilers in the National Basketball League (NBL) and also serves as an assistant coach for the Uganda men's national basketball team. In 2023, he briefly served as head coach of Uganda's under-16 national team.

Tendo played as a guard during his career, representing the Falcons from 1999 to 2007 and later the City Oilers until his retirement in 2016. Following his playing career, he transitioned into coaching, spending several years as an assistant coach with the Oilers before being promoted to head coach in 2024.

== Playing career ==
Tendo played for the Falcons from 1999 to 2007, winning five NBL championships during his tenure. He later joined the City Oilers, where he served as team captain until his retirement in 2016.

== Career ==
Following his retirement, Tendo became an assistant coach for the City Oilers under Mandy Juruni. On 22 December 2023, he was appointed head coach of the Oilers following Juruni's departure to join Rwanda-based Kepler BBC. Tendo is set to lead the team in their second season in the Basketball Africa League (BAL) in April 2024.

In 2023, Tendo coached the Uganda national under-16 team. He also became an assistant coach for the Uganda senior national team, reuniting with Juruni. Additionally, he served as head coach during the 2023 AfroBasket qualifying window.

== Non-basketball career ==
Tendo is a lawyer by profession.
