= Falando Jones =

American basketball player (born 1990)

City Oilers
- Position: Small forward
- League: Egyptian Premier League

Personal information
- Born: May 9, 1990 (age 35) Greenwood, Mississippi, U.S.
- Listed height: 6 ft 4 in (1.93 m)
- Listed weight: 198 lb (90 kg)

Career information
- High school: Greenwood High School (Greenwood, Mississippi); Mississippi Delta Community College (Moorhead, Mississippi)
- College: Mississippi Valley State University (2010–2012)
- Playing career: 2013–present

Career history
- 2013–2014: Porvoon Tarmo
- 2014–2015: Laskar Dreya South Sumatra
- 2018–2019: Al Fateh
- 2019–2020: Suez Canal
- 2021: Misr Insurance
- 2021–2022: Smouha
- 2022: City Oilers
- 2022–2023: Al Fateh
- 2023: City Oilers
- 2024: Gezira
- 2024–present: City Oilers

Career highlights
- BAL scoring champion (2023)

Falando Cortez Jones (born May 17, 1990) is an American professional basketball player who last played for the City Oilers of the Ugandan NBL and the Basketball Africa League (BAL). He was the scoring champion of the BAL in the 2023 season.

== College career ==
Jones, originally from Greenwood, Mississippi, played for Mississippi Valley State Delta Devils basketball team from 2010 to 2012. In 51 games for the Delta Devils, he averaged 8.4 points and 3.9 rebounds.

== Professional career ==
Jones began his professional career with the Finnish second division club Porvoon Tarmo, where he averaged 17.9 points in the 2013–14 season.

The following year, in 2014–15, Jones played for Indonesian club Laskar Dreya South Sumatra of the ASEAN Basketball League. In 2018, he signed with Al Fateh of the Saudi Premier League.

In 2019, Jones moved to Egyptian club Horse Owners' Club of the Egyptian Basketball Premier League. After one season, he signed with Misr Insurance, before joining Smouha.

In 2022, he joined the City Oilers of Uganda. Jones was instrumental in the Oilers' efforts to qualify for their first-ever BAL season. On November 15, Jones scored 15 points against Matero Magic in his Oilers debut in the Road to BAL. Later, he scored 40 points in the game against Cape Town Tigers on November 26, 2022.

In the 2023 BAL season, Jones became the league's scoring champion following his 21.6 points per game average.

Jones joined Egyptian club Gezira in April 2024. In November 2024, Jones returned to the City Oilers for a third stint.
