= George Galanopoulos (basketball) =

American basketball coach

George Galanapoulos
Washington State Cougars
- Position: Assistant coach
- League: West Coast Conference

Personal information
- Born: March 11, 1989 (age 37) Buffalo Grove, Illinois, U.S.
- Listed height: 6 ft 2 in (1.88 m)

Career information
- College: Indiana
- Coaching career: 2015–present

Career history

Coaching
- 2015–2016: Hawke's Bay Hawks (assistant)
- 2016–2018: Texas Legends (assistant)
- 2017–present: Uganda
- 2018–2020: Dallas Mavericks (assistant VC)
- 2019–2023: Texas Legends
- 2023–2024: Rip City Remix (associate HC)
- 2024–present: Washington State Cougars (assistant)

George Galanopoulos (born 11 March 1989) is an American professional basketball coach who is currently serving as the assistant head coach of the 2024–25 Washington State Cougars men's basketball team and 2025–26 Washington State Cougars men's basketball team . He is the former associate head coach of Rip City Remix and head coach of the Texas Legends of the National Basketball Association G league (NBA G League). He is also the head coach of the Uganda men's national basketball team since 2017.

== Coaching career ==
After graduating from College, George has coached many teams including:

- Bakersfield Jam

As a player development coach, then as an assistant coach

- Hawkes Bay Hawks

As an assistant coach

- Texas Legends

As an assistant coach then head coach

- Dallas Mavericks

As assistant video coordinator, then later head coach for the summer league

- Rip City Remix

As associate head coach

- Washington State Cougars

As assistant head coach

- Uganda men's national basketball team

As head coach
