= FIBA Africa Zone 5 Club Championship (men) =

- Organising body: FIBA Africa
- Founded: 1985
- First season: 1985
- Folded: 2018
- Countries: Zone 5 member countries
- Confederation: FIBA Africa
- Number of teams: 6–15
- International cup: FIBA Africa Basketball League
- Last champions: (Egypt) Al Ahly (1st title) (2018)
- Most championships: (Kenya) Co-op Bank (5 titles)

The FIBA Africa Zone 5 Club Championship was a men's and women's basketball club competition for teams in FIBA Africa's Zone 5, which exists of teams in East Africa. The winners of the zone championship qualified for the FIBA Africa Club Champions Cup (later the FIBA Africa Basketball League). The tournament was held annually in October, with teams qualifying through their domestic leagues.

The last competition was played in 2018, after which no championship has been held anymore, although East African team play each other in the Road to BAL, but no regional championship title is awarded anymore.

Co-op Bank from Kenya holds the record for most championships with five titles. Kenya was the most successful nation as well with as many as nine titles that were attributed to teams from the country.

== Results ==
Ed.	Year	Finals host	Final			Third place game			Num. teams	Ref.
Ed.	Year	Finals host	Winners	Score	Runners-up	Third place	Score	Fourth place	Num. teams	Ref.
10	1995	(Zimbabwe); Harare								
11	1996	(Kenya); Nairobi	(Kenya); Co-op Bank							
12	1997	(Uganda); Kampala	(Kenya); Co-op Bank							
13	1998	(Tanzania); Dar es Salaam	(Kenya); Co-op Bank							
14	1999	(Zambia); Lusaka	Cobra							
15	2000	(Uganda); Kampala	(Uganda); Falcons							
16	2001	(Rwanda); Kigali	(Tanzania); Savio							
17	2002	(Kenya); Nairobi	(Rwanda); APR							
18	2003	Zanzibar	(Kenya); Ulinzi Warriors							
19	2004	(Uganda); Kampala	(Kenya); Post Bank							
20	2005	(Tanzania); Dar es Salaam	(Kenya); KCB Lions							
21	2006	(Kenya); Nairobi	(Kenya); KCB Lions							
22	2007	(Rwanda); Kigali	(Rwanda); APR						12	
23	2008	(Ethiopia); Addis Ababa	(Rwanda); APR							
24	2009	(Uganda); Kampala	(Kenya); Co-op Bank		(Uganda); Kyambogo Warriors				10	
25	2010	(Burundi); Bujumbura	(Kenya); Co-op Bank							
26	2011	(Tanzania); Dar es Salaam	(Burundi); Urunani							
27	2012	(Uganda); Kampala	(Rwanda); Espoir	90–39	(Burundi); Urunani	(Uganda); Dmark Power	66–65	(Kenya); KCB Lions		
28	2013	(Burundi) Bujumbura	(Burundi); Urunani	65–56	(Rwanda); Espoir					
29	2014	(Kenya); Mombasa	(Burundi); Urunani	68–59	(Kenya); KPA				8	
30	2015	(Rwanda); Kigali	(Egypt); Gezira	75–73	(Uganda); City Oilers				10	
31	2016	(Uganda); Kampala	(Uganda); City Oilers	72–49	(Kenya); Ulinzi Warriors	(Rwanda); Patriots	67–60	(Kenya); USIU Tigers	10	
32	2017	(Uganda); Kampala	(Uganda); City Oilers	86–59	(Rwanda); Patriots	(Uganda) Dmark Power and (Kenya) KPA			8	
33	2018	(Tanzania); Dar es Salaam	(Egypt); Al Ahly	68–67	(Egypt); Smouha	(Rwanda); REG				

== Statistics ==
=== Performance by club ===
Performances in the FIBA Africa Zone Five Club Championship
Club	Titles	Runners-up	Years won	Years runners-up
(Kenya) Co-op Bank	5	0	1996, 1997, 1998, 2009, 2010	—
(Burundi) Urunani	3	1	2011, 2013, 2014	2012
(Rwanda) APR	3	1	2002, 2007, 2008	—
(Kenya) KCB Lions	2	0	2005, 2006	—
(Uganda) City Oilers	2	1	2016, 2017	2015
(Rwanda) Espoir	1	1	2012	2013
(Egypt) Gezira	1	0	2015	—
(Kenya) Post Bank	1	0	2004	—
(Kenya) Ulinzi Warriors	1	1	2003	2016
(Tanzania) Savio	1	0	2002	—
Cobra	1	0	1999	—
(Egypt) Al Ahly	1	0	2018	—
(Uganda) Falcons	1	0	2000	—
(Uganda) Kyambogo Warriors	0	1	—	2009
(Kenya) KPA	0	1	—	2014
(Egypt) Smouha	0	1	—	2018
(Rwanda) Patriots	0	1	—	2017

=== Performance by country ===
Nation	Winners	Runners-up
Kenya	9	2
Rwanda	4	3
Uganda	3	2
Burundi	3	1
Egypt	2	1
Tanzania	1	0
