= Robinson Opong =

Ugandan basketball player

No. 5 – MBB
- Positions: Shooting guard, small forward
- League: BAL

Personal information
- Born: 10 May 1989 (age 37) Kampala, Uganda
- Listed height: 1.91 m (6 ft 3 in)
- Listed weight: 95 kg (209 lb)

Career information
- High school: Cégep de Sainte-Foy, Quebec City
- College: LIU Brooklyn (2010–2012); Rogers State (2012–2014)
- NBA draft: 2014: undrafted
- Playing career: 2015–present

Career history
- 2015–2016: Saint John Mill Rats
- 2017: Antonine
- 2017: City Oilers
- 2018: Óbila
- 2018: Halifax Hurricanes
- 2018: Ferroviário da Beira
- 2019: Peñas Huesca
- 2019–2020: City Oilers
- 2020: Saskatchewan Rattlers
- 2021: Rivers Hoopers
- 2022: Obras Sanitarias
- 2023: City Oilers
- 2024–2025: City Oilers
- 2025–present: MBB

Robinson Odoch Opong (born 10 May 1989) is a Canadian- Ugandan professional basketball player who last played for MBB of the Basketball Africa League (BAL). He also plays for the Uganda national basketball team. Robinson Opong was born in Quebec City, Quebec, Canada. Opong represented Uganda at the AfroBasket 2017 leading his team in minutes and points.

== Career ==
On 11 April 2020, Opong signed with the Saskatchewan Rattlers of the Canadian CEBL. In April 2021, Opong signed with Rivers Hoopers to play in the 2021 BAL season. He replaced the injured Festus Ezeli.

He played 17 games in Argentina in the 2022–23 season for Obras Sanitarias, before he was released on 27 December 2022. In November 2023, Opong joined City Oilers for a third stint.

He represented Uganda at AfroBasket 2017, leading his team in minutes, points, and steals. In May 2025, Opong joined South African team MBB Basketball for the 2025 BAL season.

== BAL career statistics ==
Year	Team	GP	GS	MPG	FG%	3P%	FT%	RPG	APG	SPG	BPG	PPG
2021	Rivers Hoopers	3	1	17.4	.158	.083	–	3.3	1.0	.0	.3	2.3
2024	City Oilers	6	6	19.2	.260	.212	.833	2.7	0.7	0.7	0.0	6.3

== See also ==
- Dennis Kasumba
- Natasha Shirazi
