= Guibert Nijimbere =

Burundian basketball player (born 1996)

Remesha
- Position: Point guard
- League: Viva Basketball League

Personal information
- Born: 26 December 1996 (age 29) Mutanga-Nord, Burundi
- Listed height: 186 cm (6 ft 1 in)

Career information
- Playing career: 2013–present

Career history
- 2013–2017: New Star
- 2017–2019: IPRC-Kigali
- 2019–2021: Patriots
- 2021–2023: Urunani
- 2023–2024: Dynamo
- 2024: Kepler

Career highlights
- EABCC champion (2024); All-EABCC Team (2024); Burundian League champion (2022); First-team All-RBL (2019); RBL All-Star (2019); Genocide Memorial Tournament MVP (2019)

Joe Guibert Nijimbere (born 26 December 1996) is a Burundian basketball player for Kepler and the Burundi national basketball team.

== Early life ==
Nijimbere was born on 26 December 1996 in Mutanga-Nord, a suburb of Bujumbura, the largest city in the country. He was the second of 9 children. He grew up attending his father's Sunday league basketball games with his three brothers, all of whom ended up playing the sport.

== Career ==
Starting his career for New Star in 2013, he became the youngest player to play at Burundi's highest level at the age of 16. In 2017, Nijimbere signed with IPRC-Kigali in Rwanda.

In 2019, he joined Patriots BBC and was part of the team that qualified for the 2020 BAL season. He was named MVP of the 2019 Genocide Memorial Tournament and won the three-point contest in that year's All-Star game.

In November 2021, Nijimbere returned to New Star to play in the second round of the 2022 BAL Qualifying Tournaments.

In January 2022, Nijimbere Guibert signed a two-year professional contract with Urunani BBC and at the beginning of August 2022 Urunani became the champion of the national basketball league of Burundi: VBL (Viva Basketball League).

On 14 August, Urunani BBC has drawn up a list of 12 players who will represent the club in the BAL Qualifiers with Guibert Nijimbere at the top of the list.

He joined Dynamo in October 2023 ahead of the 2024 BAL qualification tournament. In April 2024, Nijimbere signed with Kepler BBC of the Rwanda Basketball League.

In December 2024, Nijimbere played with Remesha in the East Africa Basketball Championship Cup (EABCC) and won the inaugural championship. He was named to the All-Star Team.

== Personal ==
Nijimbere has studied at the Free University of Kigali.
