= Stanley Ocitti =

Ugandan basketball player (born 1980)

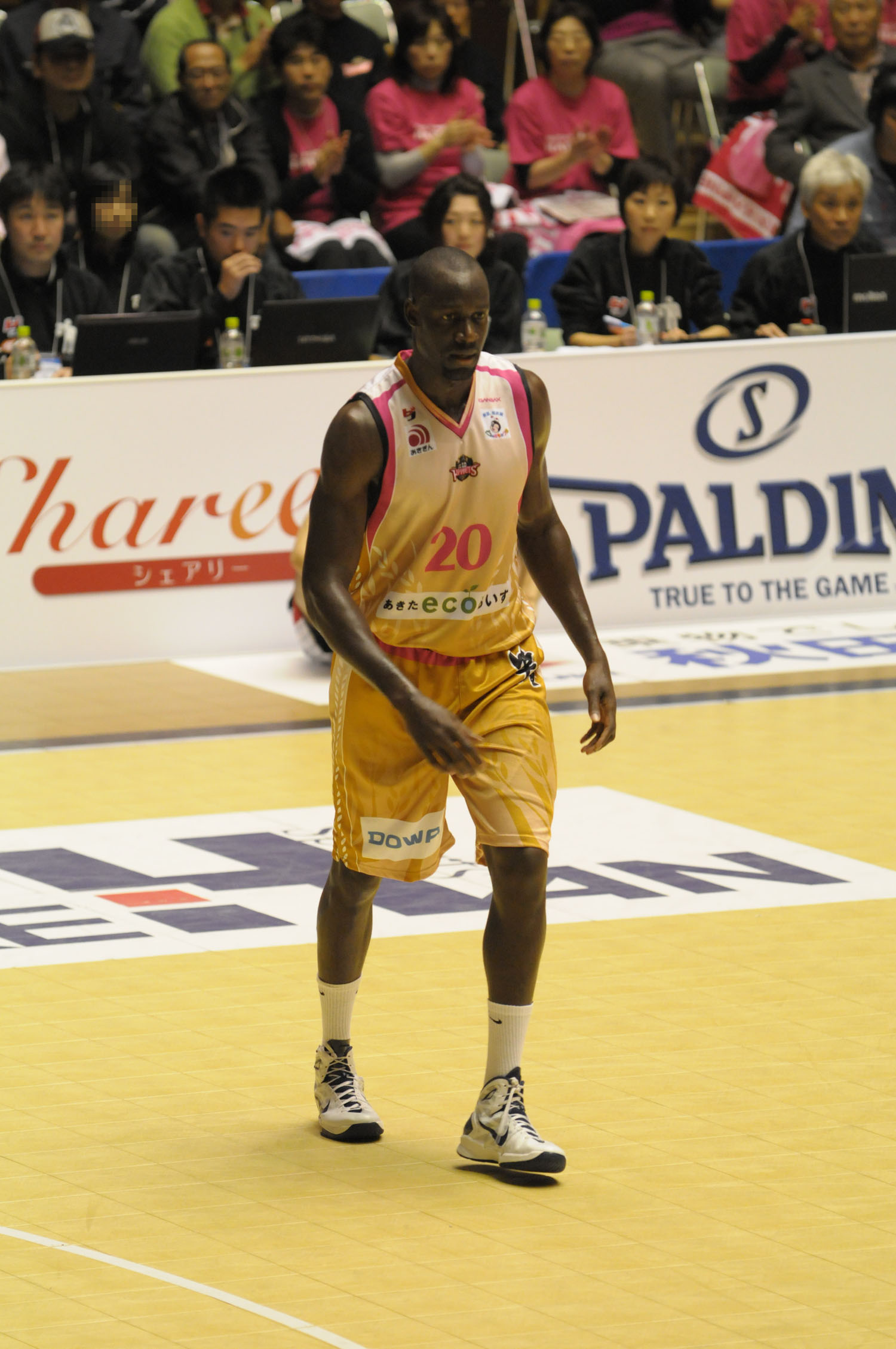
- Ocitti with Akita Happinets in 2011

Personal information
- Born: 28 May 1980 (age 46) Kampala, Uganda
- Listed height: 6 ft 8 in (2.03 m)
- Listed weight: 229 lb (104 kg)

Career information
- High school: Cambridge Rindge and Latin (Cambridge, Massachusetts)
- College: UConn (1999–2000); Binghamton (2001–2003)
- NBA draft: 2003: undrafted
- Playing career: 2003–2017
- Position: Power forward / center

Career history
- 2003–2004: Den Helder
- 2004–2005: Asker Aliens
- 2005–2006: Gnaras KC Dombóvár
- 2006–2007: Vienna
- 2007–2008: Polaroid Lami Ved
- 2008: Falco
- 2008–2009: Hamamatsu Higashimikawa Phoenix
- 2010: Manchester Millrats
- 2011: Cockburn Cougars
- 2011–2012: Akita Northern Happinets
- 2012: Saint John Riptide
- 2013: Worcester Wolves
- 2013–2014: Aomori Wat's
- 2016–2017: City Oilers

Career highlights
- Norwegian League champion (2005)

Stanley Ocitti (sometimes referred to as Stanley Ochaya Ocitti) (born 28 May 1980) is a Ugandan former professional basketball player. He played for the Aomori Watts Sports Club of the bj league in Japan. Ocitti is one of Uganda's most prominent basketball figures.

He played most minutes, scored most points and grabbed most rebounds for the Uganda national basketball team at the 2015 FIBA Africa Championship in Radès, Tunisia.

In 2005, Ocitti won the Norwegian championship with Asker Aliens.

== College statistics ==
Year	Team	GP	GS	MPG	FG%	3P%	FT%	RPG	APG	SPG	BPG	PPG
1998–99	UConn											
1999–00	UConn	3			.000	.000	.000	0.0	0.0	0.0	0.0	0.0
2001–02	Binghamton	24	3	15.2	.408	.371	.667	3.6	0.7	0.3	0.6	4.7
2002–03	Binghamton	27	1	13.7	.432	.395	.667	3.1	0.6	0.3	0.7	6.0
Career		54	4	14.4	.420	.387	.667	3.2	0.6	0.3	0.6	5.1

== Career statistics ==
Legend
GP	Games played	GS	Games started	MPG	Minutes per game
FG%	Field goal percentage	3P%	3-point field goal percentage	FT%	Free throw percentage
RPG	Rebounds per game	APG	Assists per game	SPG	Steals per game
BPG	Blocks per game	PPG	Points per game	**Bold**	Career high

=== Regular season ===
Year	Team	GP	GS	MPG	FG%	3P%	FT%	RPG	APG	SPG	BPG	PPG
2003–04	Den Helder	35		16.5	.357	.266	.625	3.5	0.8	1.1	0.4	5.1
2005–06	Dombovar	26		32.5	.503	.439	.674	6.8	1.5	2.2	0.8	14.4
2006–07	Vienna	15		29.3	.486	.368	.476	7.5	1.6	0.7	0.9	10.5
2008–09	Falco	5		18.6	.333	.222	.688	7.0	1.6	1.8	0.2	6.2
2008–09	Hamamatsu	37	37	26.5	.386	.308	.621	7.9	1.5	1.3	0.5	9.6
2011–12	Akita	28	25	28.5	.488	.328	.657	9.3	1.4	0.9	1.2	13.1
2011–12	St John	9	6	27.6	.393	.372	.889	6.78	1.89	1.00	1.11	10.44
2012–13	Worcester	35	28	30.9	.469	.402	.831	9.14	1.69	0.69	1.09	13.97
2013–14	Aomori	34		24.5	.387	.401	.677	5.8	1.1	0.6	0.5	9.5
2017	Oilers	8		26.6	.375	.404	1.000	5.8	1.3	0.9	0.4	9.4

=== FIBA Senior Team Events Stats ===
Year	Team	GP	GS	MPG	FG%	3P%	FT%	RPG	APG	SPG	BPG	PPG
2015	AfroBasket	5		31.11	.350	.263	.538	6.4	0.6	0.8	0.4	14.6
2017	AfroBasket	3		27.07	.438	.400	.500	4.3	1.3	1.3	0.3	13.0
2017	African World Cup Qualifier	3		30.50	.375	.300	1.000	6.0	2.7	0.7	0.3	10.3
Career		11		29.58	.375	.313	.563	5.7	1.4	0.9	0.4	13.0

=== International Awards & Honors ===
- British BBL Week 6 Team of the Week First Team - 2012–2013
- British BBL Week 7 Team of the Week Honorable Mention - 2012–2013
- British BBL Week 8 Team of the Week Honorable Mention - 2012–2013
- British BBL Week 10 Team of the Week Honorable Mention - 2012–2013
- British BBL Week 18 Team of the Week Honorable Mention - 2012–2013
- British BBL Week 20 Team of the Week First Team - 2012–2013
- British BBL Week 25 Team of the Week First Team - 2012–2013
- British BBL Week 28 Team of the Week Honorable Mention - 2012–2013

=== Playoffs ===
Year	Team	GP	GS	MPG	FG%	3P%	FT%	RPG	APG	SPG	BPG	PPG
2011–12	St John	2		28.0	.286	.308	.000	4.5	2.0	1.5	0.5	8.0
2012–13	Worcester	2		28.5	.391	.308	.000	7.5	2.0	0.5	0.5	11.0
2013–14	Aomori	2	0	26.00	.450	.200	.500	6.5	2.0	1.0	0	10.5
