= Dane Miller Jr. =

American basketball player (born 1990)

No. 22 – APR
- Position: Small forward / power forward
- League: BAL

Personal information
- Born: May 10, 1990 (age 35) Rochester, New York, U.S.
- Listed height: 6 ft 8 in (2.03 m)
- Listed weight: 225 lb (102 kg)

Career information
- High school: Rush–Henrietta (Henrietta, New York)
- College: Rutgers (2009–2013)
- NBA draft: 2013: undrafted
- Playing career: 2013–present

Career history
- 2013–2014: Rochester RazorSharks
- 2015–2016: Oklahoma City Blue
- 2018–2023: SLAC
- 2019: Syracuse Stallions
- 2020: Snæfell
- 2023: Shabab Al Ahli
- 2023–2024: City Oilers
- 2024: Prawira Bandung
- 2024–2025: Tycoon
- 2025: Rochester Kingz
- 2025–present: APR

Career highlights
- All-BAL First Team (2023); BAL steals leader (2023); Big East All-Rookie Team (2010)

Dane Miller Jr. (born May 10, 1990) is an American basketball player for APR BBC of the Basketball Africa League (BAL). He was a All-BAL First Team selection in 2023, while playing for SLAC.

== College career ==
Miller Jr. played for Rutgers in four seasons. He was named to the Big East All-Rookie Team in 2010.

== Professional career ==
Miller was drafted by the Oklahoma City Blue in the 2014 draft of the NBA D-League. On January 9, 2015, Miller officially signed with the Oklahoma City Blue of the NBA D-League.

Miller started playing with SLAC in Guinea in 2018. He played with SLAC in the 2018–19 Africa Basketball League, averaging 15.3 points and 7 rebounds for his team.

On January 19, 2019, Miller signed with the Syracuse Stallions to play in The Basketball League (TBL).

On August 15, 2020, Miller signed with Snæfell of the Icelandic Premier League.

He returned to SLAC to play in the 2022 BAL qualification. By averaging 16.8 points and 9.8 rebounds, Miller Jr. helped the team qualify for the 2022 BAL season, the first appearance of the club in the Basketball Africa League.

In the 2022 season, Miller Jr. averaged 14.7 points, 7.2 rebounds and 5.7, helping SLAC reach the quarterfinals.

The following BAL season, in 2023, Miller Jr. averaged career-highs of 21.2 points on 55.6% shooting and 3.2 steals per game. Despite his club missing the playoffs, he was given a place in the All-BAL First Team because of his play.

In November 2023, Miller Jr. joined City Oilers from Uganda. Miller Jr. made his debut on November 21, 2023, against COSPN with 18 points in an 81–76 win.

On December 8, 2023, Miller signed with the Prawira Bandung of the Indonesian Basketball League (IBL). He rejoined the Oilers in April 2024 for the 2024 BAL season.

Miller played for the Rochester Kingz of The Basketball League (TBL) during the 2025 TBL season.

In May 2025, Miller joined APR for the 2025 BAL season, his fourth consecutive BAL season.

== BAL career statistics ==
Legend
GP	Games played	GS	Games started	MPG	Minutes per game
FG%	Field goal percentage	3P%	3-point field goal percentage	FT%	Free throw percentage
RPG	Rebounds per game	APG	Assists per game	SPG	Steals per game
BPG	Blocks per game	PPG	Points per game	**Bold**	Career high
*	Led the league

Year	Team	GP	GS	MPG	FG%	3P%	FT%	RPG	APG	SPG	BPG	PPG
2022	SLAC	**6**	**6**	37.8*	.397	.158	**.711**	7.2	**5.7**	1.8	0.8	14.7
2023	SLAC	5	5	**39.3***	**.556***	.100	.694	**7.6**	4.4	**3.4***	**1.2**	**21.2**
2024	City Oilers	**6**	**6**	30.1	.444	**.364**	.478	6.3	4.0	1.7	.2	10.2
