= Stephen Omony =

Ugandan basketball player

No. 12 – City Oilers
- Position: Small forward
- League: National Basketball League

Personal information
- Born: 3 November 1981 (age 45) Namuwongo, Kampala, Uganda
- Listed height: 6 ft 6 in (1.98 m)

Career information
- High school: Kitante Hill School (1998–2000)
- Playing career: 1997–present

Career history
- 1997: Blue Jackets
- 1998–2000: Mountain Dew Falcons
- 2001–2008: PLS Hawks
- 2010: Miracle Eagles
- 2011–2016: Falcons
- 2017–present: City Oilers

Career highlights
- 3× NBL Uganda champion (2018, 2019, 2022)

Stephen Omony (born 3 November 1981) though some sources mention March 23, 1980, is an Ugandan professional basketball player. He currently plays for the City Oilers of Uganda’s National Basketball League (NBL).

Born in the Namuwongo neighbourhood in Kampala, Omony has played for several teams in the Ugandan top level. In 2017, he signed with the City Oilers for four years.

He has been the team captain of Uganda's national basketball team.
