= Sunday Omony =

- Born: Kitgum District, Uganda
- Citizenship: Canadian
- Modeling information
- Height: 5 ft 9 in (1.75 m)
- Hair color: Black
- Website: http://www.sundayomony.com/

Sunday Omony is a Ugandan-Canadian plus-size model, TV host and an author.

== Career ==
Omony hosted Calgary's Miss South Sudan 2010 Pageant and Canada's Miss Exotika beauty pageant in 2013. She worked as a procurement analyst in the oil industry.

=== Modeling ===
Omony started modeling when she was sixteen. She was first spotted by a Mode Models agent in 2002 at a career fair. She modeled for African magazines FabAfriq and Tropics. She has modeled for Italian Vogue, Old Navy and the Heart and Stroke Foundation of Canada.

She started losing weight when she first started modeling, pressured to be skinny by industry standards. Instead, she became a full-time plus-size model. She has been interviewed on the CBC's Daybreak Alberta about her plus-size modeling and activism.

=== Humanitarian ===
Omony started the non-profit organization Immigrant Youth Empowerment Society in 2004. The mission of the organization is to empower young people in their neighborhoods around education and family life. She also works with the FEED1 Project, Hearts 4 Peace, and the Heart and Stroke Foundation of Canada. Omony had her own TV show, the Sunday Omony Show, which aired on Shaw TV.

== Personal life ==
Omony was born in the Kitgum District of Uganda before moving to Canada when she was 6. She is the oldest of four siblings. In 1991, she moved to Canada. She lives in Calgary, Alberta. Omony is studying for a bachelor's degree in Communications and Culture from the University of Calgary.

In 2017 Omony falsely accused a member of the Calgary Police Service of racial profiling after refusing to pull over during a traffic stop. She later retracted her statements after video of the interaction was released publicly that refuted her claims of racism and profiling by the members of the CPS.
