= James Okello =

Ugandan basketball player

No. 15 – City Oilers
- Position: Power forward / center
- League: NBL

Personal information
- Born: 26 January 1990 (age 36) Kampala, Uganda
- Listed height: 1.97 m (6 ft 6 in)
- Listed weight: 95 kg (209 lb)

Career information
- Playing career: 2013–present

Career history
- 2013–present: City Oilers

Career highlights
- 9× NBL Uganda champion (2013–2020, 2022); 3× NBL Uganda Playoffs MVP (2019, 2020, 2022)
Medals
Men's basketball
Representing Uganda
Gold medal – first place	2017 Africa Zone 5
Gold medal – first place	2018 Africa Zone 5

James Okello (born 26 January 1990) is a Ugandan basketball player, who plays for City Oilers and the Uganda national basketball team.

== Early and personal life ==
While his father was polygamous, James Okello was the sixth of nine children to his mother.

In school, besides basketball, he was involved in athletics (as a sprinter) and soccer. Okello’s sporting efforts especially in basketball right through school earned him a full scholarship at Crane High School for five years. In 2010, he received his degree there.

In November 2013, when James Okello was right in the middle of the national playoffs, his father died. Henceforth, James Okello took care of the family.

He has a Diploma in Procurement from Makerere University Business School.

Uganda's Rugby national team star Phillip Wokorach is Okello’s step brother. They both wear the jersey number 15. When Okello won the 2019 National Championship, Wokorach posted on social media that "Number 15 rules the nation."

== Club career ==
James Okello was recruited by the City Oilers in 2012. This was on the recommendation of Okello's high school coach, Justus Mugisha, who, as of early 2020 has worked as an assistant coach for the Oilers.

In 2019, Okello was voted the Uganda Sports Press Association male basketball player of the year. That was before he inspired the Oilers to an unprecedented seventh successive National Basketball League (NBL) title.

During the 2019–20 playoff finals with UCU Canons, the Oilers were missing key players: Stephen Omony and Nigerian import Francis Azolibe. Also, Jonathan Egau did not play. Tony Drileba and Daniel Jjuuko played on pain killers. Yet, Okello insured that the Oilers’ winning run would not end as he led his team to a 4–3 series victory.

During the 2018 playoff finals against the Betway Power, the Oilers lost game one 66–85. In the second game, by the end of the first quarter, Okello was bleeding, after his lower lip was deeply torn into two. Yet, he played through the pain and aided the Oilers’ 78–71 win. The Oilers later won the championship again on a 4–1 aggregate.

No player has been at City Oilers longer than James Okello. Altogether, he helped the team earn seven National Championships.

== National team career ==
He helped Uganda's national team win two Africa Zone Five championships in 2017 and 2018.

Later, he was part of the team for the AfroBasket 2021 qualification games against Egypt, Morocco and Cape Verde.

== Player profile ==
James Okello mostly plays the power forward position, in some cases he has also played center.

Hamza Nyambogo, the former KIU Titans head coach stressed Okello's intangibles: “I do not know of any player today who puts their body on the line for their team like Okello does as though everything depends on it. Yet, in basketball sense, Okello never accepts defeat.”

== BAL career statistics ==
Legend
GP	Games played	GS	Games started	MPG	Minutes per game
FG%	Field goal percentage	3P%	3-point field goal percentage	FT%	Free throw percentage
RPG	Rebounds per game	APG	Assists per game	SPG	Steals per game
BPG	Blocks per game	PPG	Points per game	**Bold**	Career high

Year	Team	GP	GS	MPG	FG%	3P%	FT%	RPG	APG	SPG	BPG	PPG
2023	City Oilers	5	0	14.2	.143	.000	.667	2.0	.8	.4	.0	1.2
2024	City Oilers	6	0	13.0	.462	.000	.000	1.3	0.8	0.2	0.0	2.0
