= Patrick Rembert =

American basketball player (born 1989)

United Generation Basketball
- Position: Guard
- League: RBL

Personal information
- Born: April 9, 1989 (age 37) Long Beach, California, U.S.
- Listed height: 6 ft 0 in (1.83 m)
- Listed weight: 187 lb (85 kg)

Career information
- High school: Lakewood (Lakewood, California)
- College: UC Irvine (2007–2011)
- Playing career: 2011–present

Career history
- 2011–2012: Šentjur
- 2012–2013: Prigorje Financije Krizevci
- 2013: MARSO Nyíregyháza
- 2014: Al-Ahli Benghazi
- 2014–2015: El Shams Club
- 2015–2016: Al Khor
- 2016: Ohud Medina
- 2016–2017: Champville SC
- 2017: Titanes del Licey
- 2017: Champville SC
- 2017–2018: Tadamon Zouk
- 2018: Socar Petkim
- 2018: Trotamundos
- 2018–2019: Lukoil Levski
- 2019–2020: Socar Petkim
- 2020–2021: Novi Pazar
- 2021: Široki
- 2021: Fethiye Belediyespor
- 2022–2023: Haia Al Qana
- 2023–2024: Kalleh Mazandaran
- 2024: City Oilers
- 2024–present: UGB

Patrick Ronald Rembert (born April 9, 1989) is an American professional basketball player for United Generation Basketball (UGB) of the Rwanda Basketball League. He played college basketball at UC Irvine from 2007 to 2011.

== College career ==
After graduating, on August 7, 2011, Rembert signed with Šentjur of Premier A Slovenian Basketball League. As a senior at UC Irvine in 2011-12 Rembert averaged 12.2 points, 3.3 rebounds and 3.3 assists in 33.1 minutes in 32 appearances.

== Professional career ==
On December 12, 2017, Rebert scored 45 points in a 110-93 away lose with Tadamon Zouk against Louaize Club. On August 4, 2018, he signed with Lukoil Levski.

Rembert played three games for Fethiye Belediyespor of the Turkish league in 2021. On January 11, 2022, he signed with Haia Al Qana of the Egyptian Basketball Super League.

In April 2024, Rembert joined Ugandan club City Oilers for the 2024 BAL season. He made his BAL debut on April 19, 2024, and scored a team-high 21 points in a 76–99 loss to Al Ahly.
