= Mandy Juruni =

Ugandan basketball player and coach (born 1982)

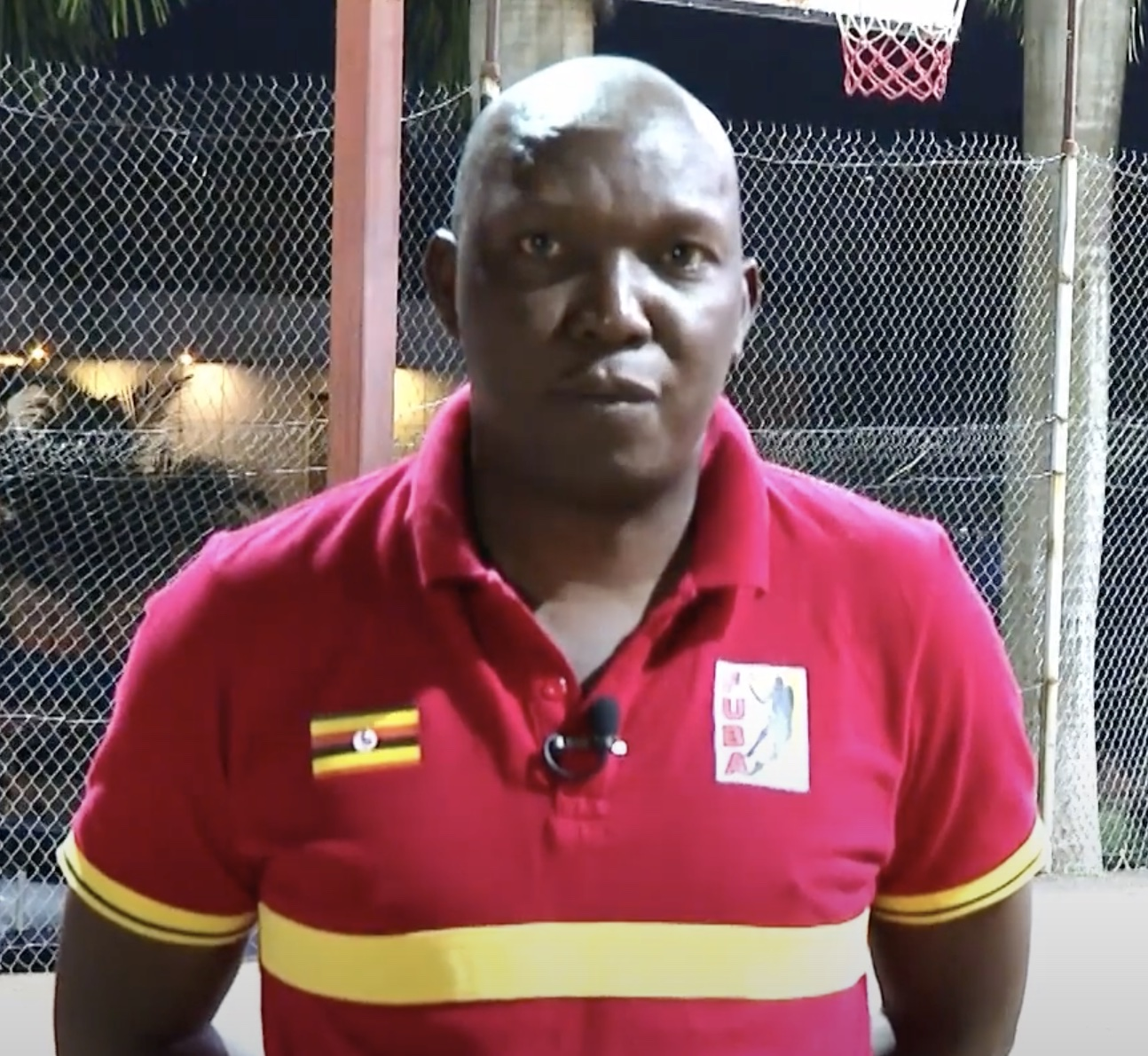
- Juruni in 2023

Kepler
- Title: Head coach
- League: RBL

Personal information
- Born: 11 November 1982 (age 44) Kampala, Uganda
- Listed height: 1.69 m (5 ft 7 in)

Career information
- Playing career: 2003–2007
- Position: Point guard
- Coaching career: 1994–present

Career history

Playing
- 2003–2007: Charging Rhinos
- 2011–2012: City Oilers

Coaching
- 2011: Kyambogo Warriors
- 2012–2023: City Oilers
- 2024–present: Kepler
- 2024–present: Fox

Career highlights
- As head coach: 10× UNBL champion (2012–2019, 2022, 2023)

Mandy Lutwama Juruni (born 11 November 1982) is a Ugandan professional basketball coach and former player. He is current head coach of Kepler of the Rwanda Basketball League (RBL). Juruni is most known for his 10-year tenure with the City Oilers in Uganda, and is widely regarded the most decorated basketball coach in Ugandan basketball history.

Juruni has also been the head coach of Uganda’s national basketball team (nicknamed the Silverbacks), which he led to two straight qualifications to the AfroBasket, the official African Basketball Championship.

== Playing career ==
During his playing career, Juruni played as point guard and played for the Charging Rhinos from 2003 to 2007.

== Coaching career ==
Juruni began coaching the City Oilers, who played in the national second division. He started as a player-coach at the time, before later taking on coaching duties. In 2012, he was also hired by the Kyambogo Warriors, whom he guided to the top-flight UNBL championship.

Juruni guided the Oilers to eight UNBL championships and one BAL qualification. The Oilers played in the 2023 BAL season's Nile Conference and finished in the sixth place after a 1–4 record. They won their first-ever BAL game against Ferroviário da Beira on 3 May.

In December 2023, Juruni signed a 2-year contract as the head coach of Kepler of the Rwanda Basketball League (RBL), which meant the end to his 10-year tenure with the City Oilers. He guided Kepler to a surprising fourth place and a playoff spot; they were eliminated in the semifinals by Patriots.

In October 2024, Juruni coached the South Sudanese team Fox in the 2025 BAL qualification, and helped them to a 3–2 record in the first round.

== Honors ==
- 2013–2019, 2022: Champion of the National Basketball League (Uganda)

== Head coaching record ==
=== BAL ===
Legend
Regular season	G	Games coached	W	Games won	L	Games lost	W–L %	Win–loss %
Playoffs	PG	Playoff games	PW	Playoff wins	PL	Playoff losses	PW–L %	Playoff win–loss %

Team	Year	G	W	L	W–L%	Finish	PG	PW	PL	PW–L%	Result
City Oilers	2023	5	1	4	.200	6th in Nile Conference	DNQ				
