= Henry Malinga =

Ugandan basketball player

JKL dolphins
- Position: Center
- League: Uganda NBL

Personal information
- Born: 1979 (age 46–47)
- Listed height: 6 ft 5.5 in (1.97 m)

Career information
- High school: Shimoni (Kampala, Uganda)
- College: Jinja College; Kyambogo College; Kyambogo University

Career history
- 2003–2015: Warriors (Uganda)
- 2015–present: KIU Titans (Uganda)

Career highlights
- 2× Uganda NBL MVP (2003, 2007); 4× Uganda NBL champion

A Henry Malinga (born 1979) is a Ugandan professional basketball player and coach who currently coaches the JKL Doplhins B.C of the Ugandan National Basketball League (NBL). He spent several seasons with the Warriors, where he was named the league's Most Valuable Player on two occasions. He is often nicknamed "The General".

== Early life ==
Emmanuel Samanya, head coach of the Kyambogo Warriors, discovered Malinga in the early 1990s and taught him the basics of basketball.

== International career ==
Malinga represents Uganda in international competition. He will play for his country as they debut at the AfroBasket in 2015. Malinga was regarded as one of his team's most talented players coming into the event. He said, "As a local player, it’s a privilege and a great opportunity to be able participate in such a big competition. It is a dream come true for Uganda basketball."

== Personal ==
Henry's brother, Eric, is a fellow professional basketball player and plays the power forward position. The duo were considered premier Ugandan League players while they were both on the Warriors. Henry also often tries to emulate the game of Hakeem Olajuwon.
