= Postnet Omony =

Ugandan footballer (born 1982)

Posnet Omony
Personal information
- Full name: Posnet Richard Omony
- Date of birth: 7 December 1982 (age 43)
- Place of birth: Kampala, Uganda
- Height: 1.80 m (5 ft 11 in)
- Position: Goalkeeper

Team information
- Current team: Roses United

Youth career
- Tooro FC

Senior career*
Years	Team	Apps	(Gls)
2001–2002	Police Jinja	?	(?)
2002–2005	Villa SC	?	(?)
2005–2010	Bloemfontein Celtic	43	(0)
2008–2009	→ Black Leopards (loan)	5	(0)
2009–2010	→ Vasco da Gama (loan)	16	(0)
2010–2011	Vasco da Gama	23	(0)
2011–2013	Black Leopards	27	(0)
2014–	Roses United		

International career^{‡}
2003–2008	Uganda	11	(0)
- * Club domestic league appearances and goals as of 31 August 2010 ‡ National team caps and goals as of 31 August 2010

Posnet Omony (born 7 December 1982) is a Ugandan football goalkeeper for South African National First Division club Roses United.
