= Namuwongo Blazers =

- Nickname: The Slum Dwellers
- League: NBL Uganda
- Founded: 2014
- Arena: ABJA Parks
- Location: Naalya, Wakiso, Uganda
- Team colors: Full Red and Full White
- Main sponsor: Motorola Solutions
- Chairman: Jane Frances Achilo
- President: Daniel Muttu Obol
- Head coach: Steven 'Escodata' Nyeko
- Team captain: Paul 'Macgyver' Odong
- Ownership: Namuwongo Community Members
- Championships: 2X NBL Championship(2025, 2026)
- Conference titles: 1 Division 1 Championship(2019)

Namuwongo Blazers, commonly known as Nam Blazers, are a Ugandan basketball team based in Namuwongo, Kampala. They are playing in the NBL Uganda, the Uganda's top level league.

Nam Blazers was established in 2014 as a community based organisation in Namuwongo, a Kampala suburb. Nam Blazers was promoted to the NBL Uganda in 2019, after finishing as runners-up in the NBL2. Signing strong players from NBL competitors It is mainly sponsored by Motorola Solutions and NRG Radio.

== Key team information ==
- Founded: 2014 as a community-based organization.
- League: Ugandan NBL (promoted in 2019).
- Nickname: "The Slum Dwellers".
- Arena: ABJA Parks in Naalya, Wakiso.
- Colors: Full Red and Full White.
- Major Achievement: 2025 NBL Champions (won the final series 4-2).

== Season by season ==
NBL champions (2019–present)	Top seed (2019–present)	Runners-up (2019–present)	Playoffs berth (2019–present)

Season	Division	League	Regular season					Postseason
Season	Division	League	Finish	Played	Wins	Losses	Win %	Postseason
Namuwongo Blazers
2019	2	Division 1	3rd	15	12	3	.800	
2021	1	NBL	3rd	7	5	2	.714	cancelled
2022	1	NBL	1st	24	19	5	.792	Won quarterfinals (Panthers) 2–0 Won semifinals (Titans) 2–0 Lost finals (Oilers) 3–4
2023	1	NBL	2nd	22	17	5	.773	Withdrew
2024	1	NBL	3rd	22	16	6	.727	Won quarterfinals (Our Savior) 2–0 Lost semifinals (Titans) 2–3
2025	1	NBL	1st	22	19	3	.864	Won quarterfinals (Rezlife Saints) 2–0 Won semifinals (Canons) 3–0 Won finals (Oilers) 4-2
NBL regular season record				97	76	21	.784	1 NBL championships
NBL playoff record				29	20	9	.690	1 NBL championships
