= Jimmy Enabu =

Ugandan basketball player (born 1988)

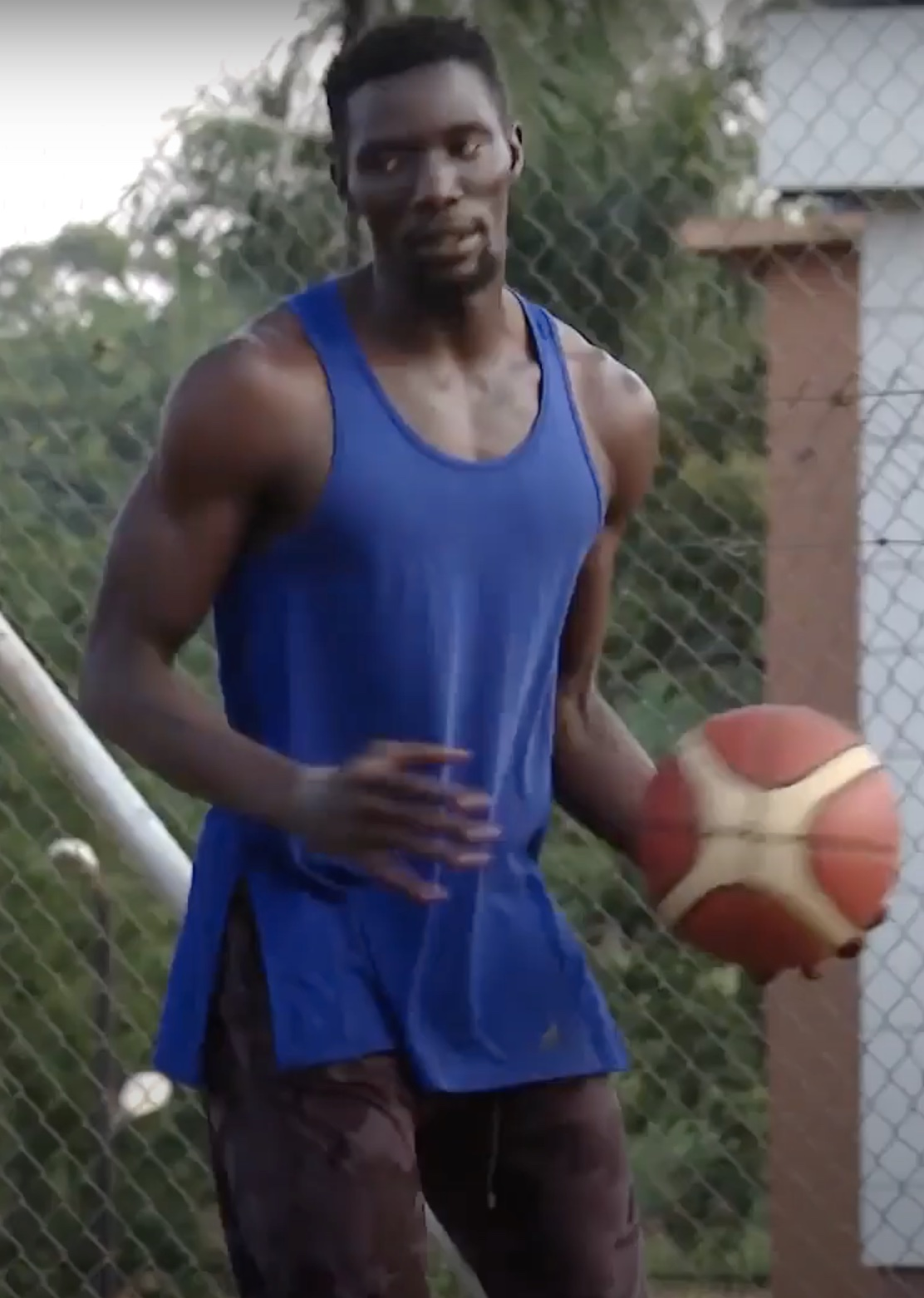
- Enabu in 2023

Personal information
- Born: 17 April 1988 (age 38) Entebbe, Uganda
- Listed height: 6 ft 2 in (1.88 m)

Career information
- Playing career: 2007–2024
- Position: Point guard
- Number: 5

Career history
- 2007–2013: Knight Riders
- 2013–2024: City Oilers

Career highlights
- 9× NBL Uganda champion (2013–2019, 2022, 2023); 2× NBL Uganda Playoffs MVP (2014, 2023)

Jimmy Abraham Enabu (born 17 April 1988) is a Ugandan professional basketball player who is regarded as one of the greatest players and point guards in Ugandan history.

== Early life ==
Enabu was born on 17 April 1988 in Entebbe, Uganda.

== Club career ==
Enabu began his career with the Knight Riders of his hometown Entebbe in 2007. In 2013, he moved to the City Oilers, with whom he won nine NBL Uganda championships, including seven consecutive titles from 2013 to 2019, and was named the league's Playoffs MVP in 2014 and 2023. He also appeared with the Oilers at the 2023 Basketball Africa League (BAL), the club's maiden appearance in the competition.

In May 2024, Enabu left the City Oilers to continue his career in Burundi. His former manager Kwizera described him as "a student of the game... he joined City Oilers as a raw athlete and transformed into the best player in Uganda."

== International career ==
Enabu represented the Uganda national basketball team at AfroBasket 2017 in Tunisia and Senegal, where he led the team in assists.

== Career statistics ==
=== BAL ===
Legend
GP	Games played	GS	Games started	MPG	Minutes per game
FG%	Field goal percentage	3P%	3-point field goal percentage	FT%	Free throw percentage
RPG	Rebounds per game	APG	Assists per game	SPG	Steals per game
BPG	Blocks per game	PPG	Points per game	**Bold**	Career high

Year	Team	GP	GS	MPG	FG%	3P%	FT%	RPG	APG	SPG	BPG	PPG
2023	City Oilers	4	4	20.4	.400	.500	.500	3.0	3.8	1.5	.3	6.3

== Achievements and honors ==
=== Club ===
- 9× NBL Uganda champion: 2013, 2014, 2015, 2016, 2017, 2018, 2019, 2022, 2023
- 2× NBL Uganda Playoffs MVP: 2014, 2023

== See also ==
- City Oilers
- Basketball in Uganda
