= Urunani BBC =

Urunani
- Nickname: Sisi Wenyewe
- League: Viva Basketball League; BAL Qualifying Tournaments
- Founded: 1979
- History: Urunani BBC; 1979–present
- Location: Bujumbura, Burundi
- President: Nkonyereza Aimé
- Vice-president: Uwintwari Lionel «Radja»
- Head coach: Pabi Guèye
- Retired numbers: 1 (8)
- Website: www.urunani.com

Urunani BBC is a Burundian basketball club based in Bujumbura. Nicknamed "Sisi Wenyewe", the team plays in the Viva Basketball League (VBL).

Since 1979, Urunani has won more than 17 national championships of Burundi (some years the national championship was not held for several reasons).

== History ==
The name Urunani means "being together, a strong and indestructible network". The club played in the Basketball Championship Amateurs de Bujumbura (ACBAB) for the first time in 1979.

Urunani BBC has already won three international competitions organized by the FIBA Zone 5. The club also played in the FIBA Africa Clubs Champions Cup in 2011, 2013 and 2014.

At mid-2021, Urunani reached an agreement with the ugandan club, City Oilers to bring back home Landry Ndikumana, and the rwandan club Tigers for Malick Ngenzahayo. It’s at the end of 2021 that Urunani have completed the signing of Guibert Nijimbere from Patriots. Ahead of the VBL 2022, the team acquired 5 international players from Uganda (Peter Obleng), South-Sudan (Peter Cheng Maleck), DRC (Michael Bwanga), Kenya (Paul Ereng Ekiru) and Nigeria (Njoku Joseph Chibuzo). With its strengthened roster, Urunani(17 wins/1 loss) managed to become the Burundian Champions and claimed a spot in the 2023 BAL Qualifiers. The team became the first-ever team from Burundi to win a semi-professional league : the Viva Basketball League in his first edition.

One of the notable players of Urunani, Elvis "Gafyisi" Hakizimana, wore number 8 during 20 seasons. On 24 January 2022, Gafyisi's jersey number was retired at the Terrain Département. On 26 January, Urunani signed Hakizimana as their new assistant coach.

In 2024, they won another national championship after defeating Dynamo in seven games in the finals, behind MVP Jean Jacques Boissy. Urunani hired Pabi Guèye, a former BAL Coach of the Year, to lead the team in the Road to BAL.

== Honours ==
Burundian Basketball Championship

- Champions (18+): 2010, 2012, 2013, 2014, 2015, 2016, 2022, 2024, 2026

President's Cup

- Winners (1+): 2015

Heroes' Cup

- Winners (3): 2019, 2021, 2022

Burundian Super Cup

- Winners (1): 2020

ACBAB

- Champions (3+): 2015, 2016, 2017

FIBA Africa Zone 5 Champions

- Winners (3): 2011, 2013, 2014

== In African competitions ==
FIBA Africa Clubs Champions Cup

- 2011 – Regular Season
- 2013 – Regular Season
- 2014 – Regular Season

== Players ==
=== 2022 roster ===
Note: Flags indicate national team eligibility at FIBA-sanctioned events. Players may hold other non-FIBA nationalities not displayed.

Urunani roster
Players
Coaches

Pos.	No.	Nat.	Name	Ht.	Wt.	Age
G	0	(Burundi)	Ngenzahayo, Malick	1.76 m (5 ft 9 in)		29 – 21 October 1996
G	4	(Rwanda)	Filer, Adonis			33 – 11 July 1993
	6	(Burundi)	Akimana, Jambon Landry			33 – 26 June 1993
PG	7	(Burundi)	Irakoze Kavakure, Brian	1.84 m (6 ft 0 in)		32 – 18 September 1993
SF	12	(Burundi)	Ndikumana, Landry	1.98 m (6 ft 6 in)		31 – 14 February 1995
C	21	(Burundi)	Ndagijimana, Oly Mogard	2.10 m (6 ft 11 in)		26 – 30 September 1999
	23	(Burundi)	Ndikuriyo, Bienvenu Richard			29 – 15 May 1997
PG	24	(Burundi)	Nsengiyumva, Yves			23 – 15 May 2003
C	32	(Ivory Coast)	Adjehi, Baru	2.06 m (6 ft 9 in)		34 – 12 October 1991
C	44	(Puerto Rico)	Parker, Timajh	2.032 m (6 ft 8.0 in)		32 – 9 February 1994
	88	(Democratic Republic of the Congo)	Kazunguzibwa, Michael			32 – 27 November 1993
PG	95	(Burundi)	Nijimbere, Guibert	1.86 m (6 ft 1 in)		31 – 1 January 1995

Head coach

Aaron Kagabo

Legend

- (C) Team captain
- Injured

=== Notable players ===
Note: Flags indicate national team eligibility at FIBA-sanctioned events. Players may hold other non-FIBA nationalities not displayed.

Criteria

To appear in this section a player must have either:

- Set a club record or won an individual award while at the club
- Played at least one official international match for their national team at any time
- Played at least one official NBA match at any time.

- (Burundi) Sindayigaya Fanny-Fabrice
- (Burundi) Nijimbere Willy
- (Burundi) Hakizimana Elvis
- (Burundi) Landry Ndikumana
- (Burundi) Ngenzahayo Malick
- (Burundi) Guibert Nijimbere
- (Rwanda) Adonis Filer
- (Spain) Álvaro Calvo Masa
- (Puerto Rico) Timajh Parker-Rivera
- (Senegal) Jean Jacques Boissy
- (South Africa) Nkosinathi Sibanyoni

== Head coaches ==
- Aaron Kagabo
- Pabi Guèye: (October 2024–present)
