= Ivan Muhwezi =

Ugandan basketball player

Personal information
- Born: January 19, 1998 (age 28)
- Listed height: 182 cm (6 ft 0 in)

Career information
- Playing career: 2017–present
- Position: Shooting guard

Career history
- 2017-2018: KIU Titans
- 2018-2025: City Oilers
- 2025: Namuwongo Blazers

Career highlights
- 4× NBL Champion (2019, 2022, 2023, 2024)

Ivan Muhwezi (born January 19, 1998) is a Ugandan basketball player, who plays as a shooting guard for Namuwongo Blazers in Uganda’s National Basketball League. He was part of the national U18 team that competed at the 2016 African Championship in Kigali, Rwanda.

== Club career ==
Muhwezi started his basketball career at Buddo Secondary School, where he played in national secondary school tournaments. In 2017, he joined the KIU Titans and he played at the UCU Invitational tournament. Muhwezi joined the City Oilers in March 2018, where he even served as team captain and in June 2025, he joined Namuwongo Blazers.

== International career ==
Muhwezi represented Uganda in the 2016 FIBA Africa U18 Championship held in Kigali, Rwanda.

Muhwezi played for Uganda Silverbacks in AfroBasket tournaments (2015, 2017, 2021) and 2025 qualifiers in Tunisia.

== Achievements and honors ==
Muhwezi was 2019 FUBA player of the match.

He was part of the City Oilers squad that won the NBL championships in 2019, 2022, 2023, and 2024.
