= Power Basketball Club =

Betway Power
- League: NBL Uganda
- Main sponsor: Betway
- President: Patrick Obalim
- General manager: Allan Musoke
- Head coach: Mchuda Lando
- Championships: 5 Ugandan Leagues

Power Basketball Club, for sponsorship reasons named Betway Power, is an Ugandan basketball team based in Kampala.

The team was already active in the 1990s, as the Baptist Saints. In 1998, then named Black Power, they were one of the founding teams of the NBL Uganda.

Power has won the NBL Uganda five times, its last title being in 2012.

== Sponsorship names ==
- Sadoline Power
- D-Mark Power (2011–2014)
- Betway Power (2020–present)

== Honours ==
NBL Uganda

- Champions (5): 1996, 2000, 2008, 2011, 2012
  - Runners-up (4): 2006, 2009, 2016, 2018
