= UCU Canons =

Ugandan basketball club

- League: National Basketball League (Uganda)
- Location: Kampala, Uganda
- Ownership: Uganda Christian University (UCU)
- Championships: 20

UCU Canons is an Ugandan basketball club based in Kampala. The team is officially part of the Uganda Christian University (UCU).

== Honours ==
National Basketball League

- Runners-up: 2019–20

== Notable players ==
- Ivan Lumanyika

== See also ==
- Victors FC
- SC Victoria University
