= City Oilers =

- 2024 City Oilers season
- Leagues: NBL Uganda; BAL
- Founded: 2011; 15 years ago
- History: City Oilers (2011–present)
- Arena: MTN Arena
- Location: Lugogo, Kampala, Uganda
- Team colors: Blue, gold and green
- Main sponsor: City Oil
- President: Hajji Mohamed Ghedi Santur
- Head coach: Andrew Tendo
- Team captain: Ivan Muhwezi
- Championships: 10 Ugandan Leagues
Home	Away	Third

City Oilers is a basketball club based in Lugogo, Kampala, Uganda. The team competes in the Ugandan National Basketball League (NBL), where it has won 10 championships, the most in league history. The Oilers currently also play in the Basketball Africa League (BAL).

Founded in 2011 by a group of friends, the team is named after its main sponsor City Oil. As of November 2026, the Oilers hold the record in most games played and wins in the Road to BAL.

== History ==
The club was founded by a group of friends who decided to play basketball together. They started playing pick-up games at courts in Kampala, with former national league players joining. Later, Justus Mugisha became head coach and suggested the team joined a basketball league. In 2011, the team was pitched to the director of oil company City Oil and the team was founded as City Oilers. The team started in the NBL Division III in 2011. Later, the team promoted to the NBL Uganda, which it would win eight straight years from 2014. Additionally, the team made several continental appearances, including the 2009 FIBA Africa Clubs Champions Cup.

The team played in the first round of the 2022 BAL Qualifying Tournaments where it finished the group play 2-0 but eventually withdrew before the start of the Elite 16. The following year, City Oilers qualified for the 2023 BAL season after beating Urunani in the third place game of the Road to BAL. The Oilers finished 6th in the Nile Conference, winning one game out of five.

The Oilers won their ninth title on 25 October 2023, following a 4-2 series win over the KIU Titans. The following month, they qualified for their second consecutive BAL season when they defeated Dynamo in the Road to BAL semi-finals on 25 November 2023.

In December 2023, Mandy Juruni decided to leave the club for an opportunity in Rwanda. As a response, the Oilers hired his assistant Andrew Tendo as the new head of the team.

== Honours ==
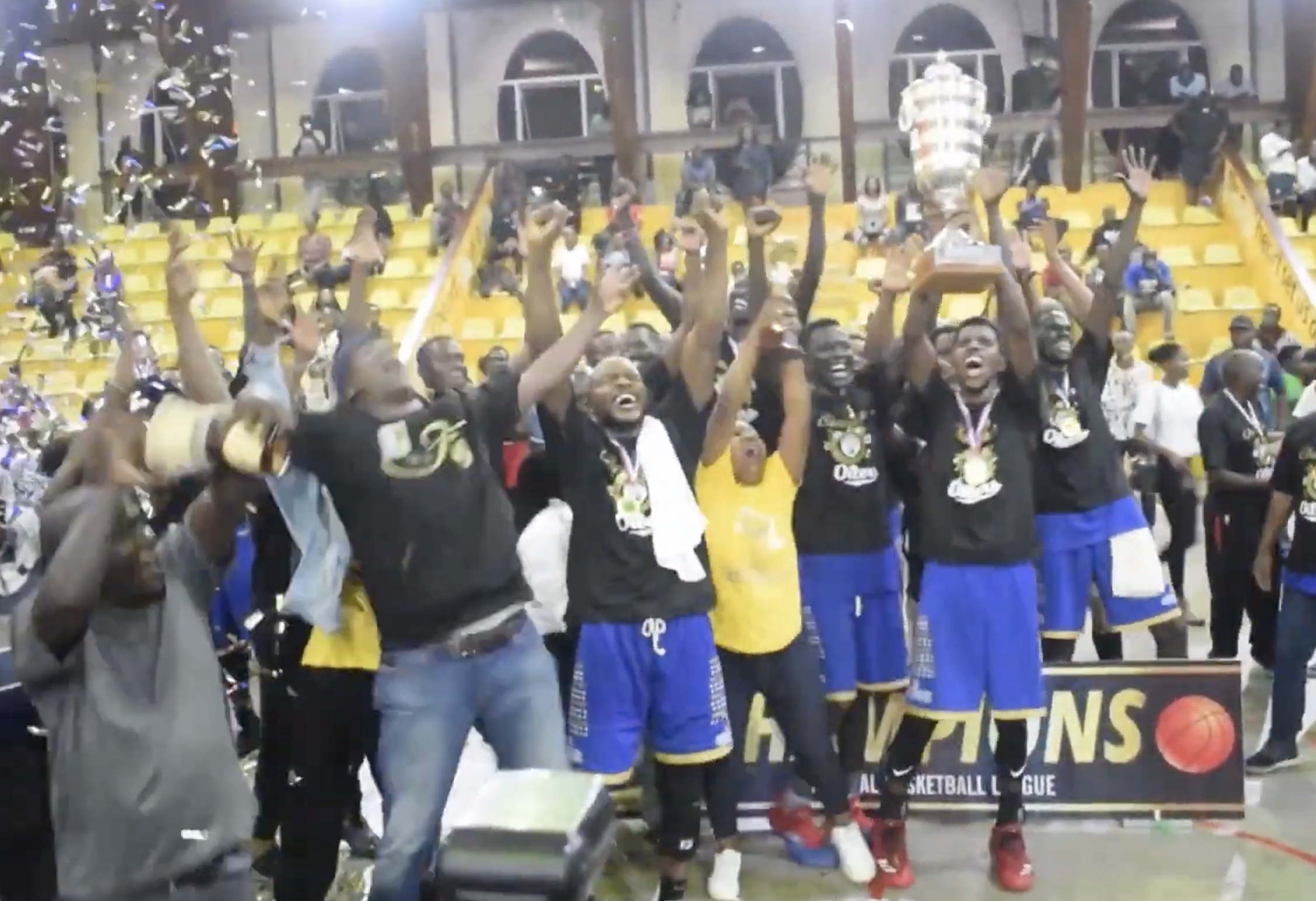
The Oilers celebrating winning the 2022 NBL championship

National Basketball League

- Champions (10): 2013, 2014, 2015, 2016, 2017, 2018, 2019, 2022, 2023, 2024

FIBA Africa Zone 5 Club Championship

- Champions (2): 2016, 2017

== In international competition ==
=== In the FIBA Africa Clubs Champions ===
FIBA Africa Clubs Champions Cup (1 appearance)

2009 – Ninth Place

=== In the Basketball Africa League ===
The City Oilers have played in the Road to BAL four times, qualifying in 2023. and 2024. They won their first BAL game on May 5, 2023, beating Ferroviário da Beira 96-75.

Season	Road to BAL				Main competition			Coach
Season	W	L	Result	Qualified	W	L	Result	Coach
2021	5	4	Fourth Place	No	DNQ			Mandy Juruni
2022	2	0	Elite 16 (Note: In the 2022 qualification, City Oilers withdrew before the start of the Elite 16.)	No	DNQ			Mandy Juruni
2023	6	2	Bronze	Yes	1	4	6th in Nile Conference	Mandy Juruni
2024	4	1	Silver	Yes	1	4	4th in Nile Conference	Karim Nesba
Total	13	6	1/3		2	8		

NB The city oilers did not participate in the 2025 ROAD TO BAL /the recent 2026 cycle.The ugandna qualifiers representatives were instead handled by the teams like NAMWONGO BLAZER( The Nairobic City Thurder) Currently, the City Oilers focus on the domestic campaign in the NATIONAL BASKETBALL LEAGUE (BAL) where they recently finished second in the regular season standing

== Players ==
=== Current roster ===
2023–24 City Oilers roster
Players
Coaches

Pos.	No.	Nat.	Name	Ht.	Age
PG	00	(United States)	Rembert, Patrick (I)	1.83 m (6 ft 0 in)	37 – 9 April 1989
PG	1	(Uganda)	Baale, Fayed	1.73 m (5 ft 8 in)	24 – 28 December 2001
PF	4	(Uganda)	Okello, James	1.93 m (6 ft 4 in)	34 – 26 January 1992
PF	6	(United States)	Miller Jr., Dane (I)	2.03 m (6 ft 8 in)	36 – 10 May 1990
SG	7	(Uganda)	Muhwezi, Ivan	1.82 m (6 ft 0 in)	28 – 19 January 1998
SG	10	(Uganda)	Drileba, Tony	1.83 m (6 ft 0 in)	32 – 19 December 1993
SF	12	(Uganda)	Allawi, Ssenkubuge	1.88 m (6 ft 2 in)	24 – 24 August 2002
C/PF	13	(Uganda)	Odeke, Titus	2.03 m (6 ft 8 in)	27 – 29 December 1998
SG	14	(Uganda)	Opong, Robinson	1.91 m (6 ft 3 in)	37 – 10 May 1989
PF	15	(Ghana)	Ahmed, Muhammed (I)	2.01 m (6 ft 7 in)	33 – 17 August 1993
G	23	(United States)	Culpepper, Randy (I)	1.83 m (6 ft 0 in)	37 – 16 May 1989
F	24	(South Sudan)	Maluach, Khaman (E)	2.18 m (7 ft 2 in)	20 – 13 September 2006

Head coach

- (Morocco) Karim Nesba

Legend

- (C) Team captain
- Injured

- Roster
Updated: 19 April 2024

=== Notable players ===
Note: Flags indicate national team eligibility at FIBA-sanctioned events. Players may hold other non-FIBA nationalities not displayed.

Criteria

To appear in this section a player must have either:

- Set a club record or won an individual award while at the club
- Played at least one official international match for their national team at any time
- Played at least one official NBA match at any time.

- (Uganda) Jimmy Enabu
- (Rwanda) Kami Kabange
- (South Sudan) Khaman Maluach
- (Uganda) Stanley Ocitti
- (Uganda) James Okello
- (Uganda) Stephen Omony
- (Uganda) Robinson Opong
- (Uganda) A'Darius Pegues

== Head coaches ==
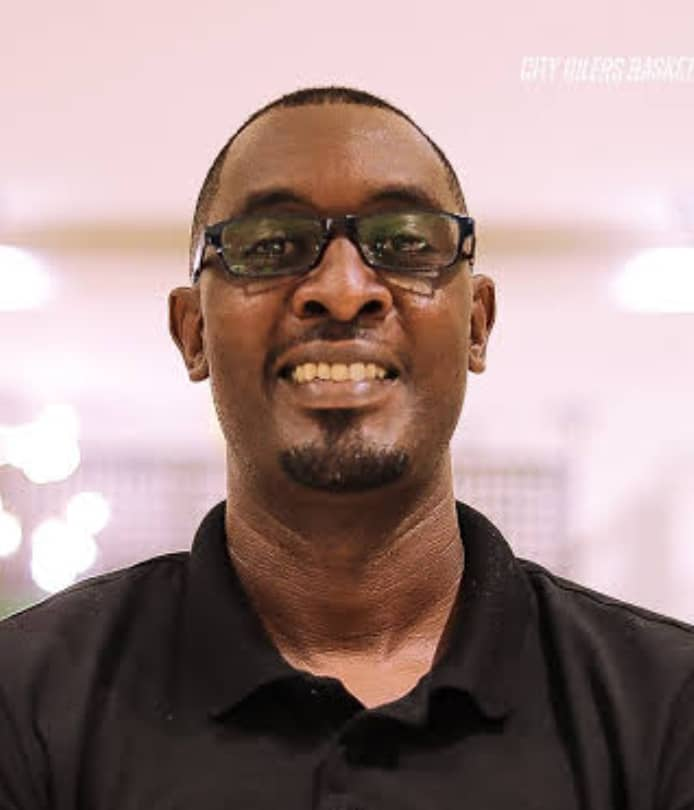
Andrew Tendo was appointed by the City Oilers as the head coach at the end of 2023. He replaced long-term coach Mandy Juruni, with whom he had worked as an assistant

- Mandy Juruni: (2012 – 2023)
- Andrew Tendo: (2024 – present)
- Karim Nesba: (2024 BAL season)
