= National Basketball League (Uganda) =

Asha National Basketball League
- Organising body: FUBA
- Founded: 1995
- First season: 1995
- Country: Uganda
- Confederation: FIBA Africa
- Number of teams: 12
- Level on pyramid: 1
- Relegation to: Division 1
- International cup: Basketball Africa League (Road to BAL)
- Current champions: Nam Blazers (2nd title) (2026)
- Most championships: City Oilers (10 titles)
- Website: Official website
- 2024 NBL Uganda season

The National Basketball League is a semi-professional basketball league in Uganda that is the highest division of men's basketball in the country. The league currently consists of 13 teams.

Established in 1995, media often highlights the league's physicality. The City Oilers dominated during the 2010s, winning seven straight NBL titles. The Oilers are the league's most decorated team with ten won championships, which were all won consecutively.

The champions of each season qualify for the Road to BAL, the qualifying rounds of the Basketball Africa League (BAL).

== History ==
Basketball was introduced in Uganda in 1962, by the American Peace Corps and East African teachers. During the 1970s and 80s, economic hardship in the country meant a decline of the sport in the country as many schools abandoned the game.

A national basketball league was founded in 1995 and started with six teams: the Kyambogo Warriors, Blue Jackets, Black Power, Rhino, Sky Jammers and Makerere University. Since 2003, the league was expanded with a second-level league, named Division 1. Since 2019, there has also been a third level named Division 2.

The City Oilers entered the league in 2013 and have since then dominated, winning ten consecutive titles.

== Current clubs ==
Team	Location
City Oilers	Silver Springs, Kampala
JKL Dolphins	Namboole, Kampala
JT Jaguars	Kira Town, Kampala
Kampala Rockets	Kampala
KCCA Panthers	Nakasero Primary School, Kampala
KIU Titans	Kampala
LivingStone	Budaka District
Namuwongo Blazers	Namuwongo, Kampala
Rezlife Saints	Kampala
Sommet	Kampala
UCU Canons	Kampala
Victoria Crocs	Kampala

== Past champions ==
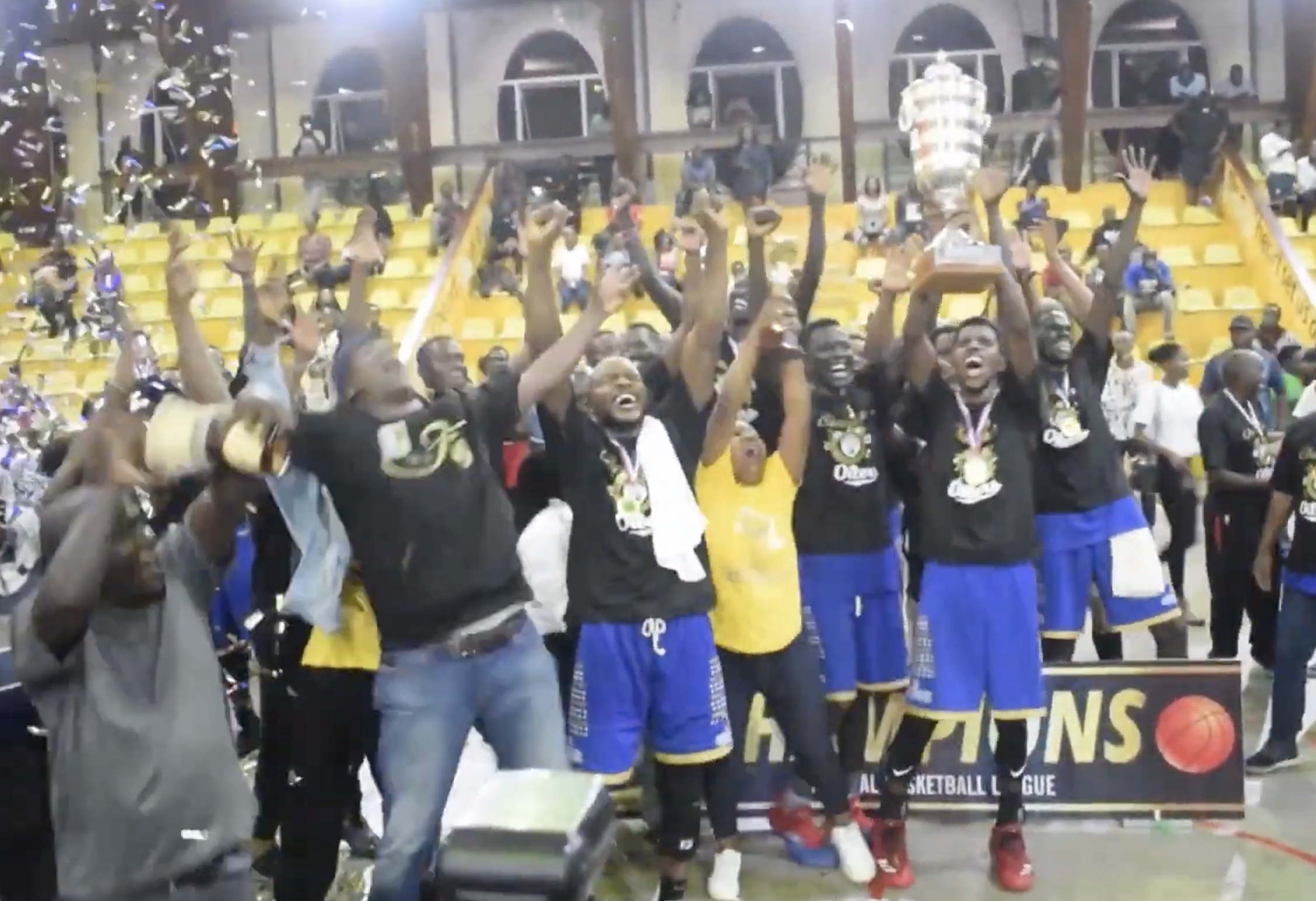
The City Oilers celebrating winning the 2022 season

Season	Champion	Finalist	Finals score	Ref.
1995	Makerere			
1996	Power			
1997	Charging Rhino			
1998	Falcons			
1999	Falcons (2)			
2000	Sadoline Power (2)			
2001	Sky Jammers			
2002	Falcons (3)			
2003	Falcons (4)			
2004	Falcons (5)			
2005	Nkumba Marines			
2006	Nkumba Marines (2)			
2007	Falcons (6)	Kyambogo Warriors	3–2	
2008	Sadoline Power (3)	Falcons	3–1	
2009	Kyambogo Warriors			
2010	DMark Power (4)	Kyambogo Warriors	4–3	
2011	DMark Power (5)	Kyambogo Warriors	3–0	
2012	Kyambogo Warriors (2)	Falcons		
2013	City Oilers	Falcons		
2014	City Oilers (2)	Power	4–0	
2015	City Oilers (3)	UCU Canons	4–3	
2016	City Oilers (4)	Betway Power	4–1	
2017	City Oilers (5)	Betway Power		
2018	City Oilers (6)	Betway Power		
2019	City Oilers (7)	UCU Canons	4–3	
2020	Cancelled due to the COVID-19 pandemic			
2021	Cancelled due to the COVID-19 pandemic			
2022	City Oilers (8)	Nam Blazers	4–3	
2023	City Oilers (9)	KIU Titans	4–2	
2024	City Oilers (10)	KIU Titans	4–0	
2025	Nam Blazers (1)	City Oilers	4–2	
2026	Nam Blazers (2)	City Oilers	4–3	

=== Titles by team ===
Team	Wins	Runners-up	Years won	Years runner-up
City Oilers	10	2	2013, 2014, 2015, 2016, 2017, 2018, 2019, 2022, 2023, 2024	2025, 2026
Falcons	6	3	1998, 1999, 2002, 2003, 2004, 2007	2008, 2012, 2013
Power	5	4	1996, 2000, 2008, 2010, 2011	2014, 2016, 2017, 2018
Kyambogo Warriors	2	3	2009, 2012	2007, 2010, 2011
Nam Blazers	2	1	2025, 2026	2022
Nkumba Marines	2	0	2005, 2006	–
Makerere University	1	0	1995	–
Charging Rhino	1	0	1997	–
Sky Jammers	1	0	2001	–
UCU Canons	0	2	–	2015, 2019
KIU Titans	0	2	–	2023, 2024

== Individual awards ==
Each year, the FUBA Awards are held, and the most valuable player of the league is named.

Year	Most Valuable Player	Playoffs MVP	Top Scorer	Ref.
2013	Bernard Okumu (Vegetarians)	Kami Kabange (Oilers)	Kami Kabange (Oilers)	
2014		Jimmy Enabu (Oilers)	Kami Kabange (2) (Oilers)	
2015	Brian Namake (UCU Canons)	Kami Kabange (Oilers)	Kami Kabange (3) (Oilers)	
2017	Jordin Mayes (Oilers)	Asher Sserugo (Oilers)	Jordin Mayes (Oilers)	
2018	Michael Makiadi (Power)	Landry Ndikumana (Oilers)	Michael Makiadi (Power)	
2019	Landry Ndikumana (Oilers)	James Okello (Oilers)	Landry Ndikumana (Oilers)	
2020	Syrus Kiviiri (Power)	James Okello (2) (Oilers)	Landry Ndikumana (Oilers)	
2022	Tonny Drileba (Oilers)	James Okello (3) (Oilers)		
2023	Titus Lual (Oilers)	Titus Lual (Oilers)	Peter Cheng (Blazers)	
2024		Titus Lual (Oilers)		
2025	Joel Lukoji Banza (Blazers)	Joel Lukoji Banza (Blazers)	Fayeed Bbale (Oilers)	
2026		Franck Fataki Nyembo (Blazers)	Edrine Ekau	

== Division 1 and Division 2 winners ==
The FUBA also organises the Division 1 (second level) and Division 2 (third level) leagues.

=== Division 1 ===
Season	Winners	Runners-up	Finals score	MVP
2019	UDPF Tomahawks	Namuwongo Blazers	3–2	Felix Mukunzi
2018	KU	Falcons		
2022	Kampala Rockets	Rezlife Saints	3–2	
2023	Livingstone	JT Jaguars	3–2	Bismarck Omoya
2025	Rezlife Saints	Victoria Crocs	4–3	

=== Division 2 ===
Season	Winners
2021	Livingstone
2025	UMU Flames
