= 2024 Rwanda Basketball Cup =

Basketball competition season in Rwanda

- Season: 2024
- Dates: 26 April – 9 August 2024
- Games played: 36
- Teams: 21

Finals
- Champions: APR (1st title)
- Runners-up: REG
- Third place: Patriots
- Fourth place: Espoir

The 2024 Rwanda Basketball Cup was the inaugural season of the Rwanda Basketball Cup, the cup competition for men's teams in Rwanda. It is organised by FERWABA, the national basketball association. The first games were played on 26 April 2024, while the playoffs began on 9 July 2024, and ended end on 9 August 2024.

The first season consisted of 21 teams from the Rwanda Basketball League as well as the Rwanda Basketball League Division 2. The first four teams from the 2023 RBL season received direct qualification for the quarterfinals, while the other teams entered the group phase.

APR won the inaugural cup title after defeating REG in the final. The winners qualified for the inaugural Rwanda Basketball Supercup, which will be held later in the year. The winners were also eligible for the East Africa Cup, a FIBA-organised competition that is yet to be announced.

== Group phase ==
The competition began with a group phase in which all teams played each other once. The top placed teams from each group advance to the quarterfinals of the playoffs.

=== Group A ===
Pos	Team	Pld	W	L	GF	GA	GD	Pts	Qualification or relegation
1	Kepler	4	4	0	344	269	+75	8	Advance to playoffs
2	Kigali Titans	4	3	1	315	306	+9	7	
3	Flame	4	2	2	296	311	−15	6	
4	East Africa University Rwanda	4	1	3	307	306	+1	5	
5	RP-IPRC Musanze	4	0	4	277	347	−70	4	

Source: FERWABA

=== Group B ===
Pos	Team	Pld	W	L	GF	GA	GD	Pts	Qualification or relegation
1	Tigers	3	3	0	308	172	+136	6	Advance to playoffs
2	Greater Virunga	3	2	1	221	188	+33	5	
3	The Hoops Juniors	3	1	2	182	236	−54	4	
4	Rebero Basketball Academy	3	0	3	173	288	−115	3	

Source: FERWABA

=== Group C ===
Pos	Team	Pld	W	L	GF	GA	GD	Pts	Qualification or relegation
1	UGB	3	3	0	253	120	+133	6	Advance to playoffs
2	Igihozo Ste Peter	3	2	1	213	206	+7	5	
3	Black Thunders	3	1	2	126	206	−80	4	
4	Intare	2	0	2	125	185	−60	2	

Source: FERWABA

=== Group D ===
Pos	Team	Pld	W	L	GF	GA	GD	Pts	Qualification or relegation
1	Azomco	3	3	0	258	180	+78	6	Advance to playoffs
2	UR-Kigali	3	2	1	280	224	+56	5	
3	Inspired Generation	3	1	2	139	183	−44	4	
4	ITS Kigali	2	0	2	110	200	−90	2	

Source: FERWABA

== Playoffs ==
=== Bracket ===
Quarter-finals
9 July
APR	111
Azomco	64
9 July
Patriots	78
Kepler	77
9 July
REG	91
UGB	76
9 July
Espoir	76
Tigers	71

Semi-finals
7 August
APR	91
Patriots	70
7 August
REG	98
Espoir	72

Final
9 August
APR	110
REG	93
Third place
9 August
Patriots	77
Espoir	59

=== Quarter-finals ===
9 July 2024
6:00 pm

Boxscore

APR	111–64	Azomco
Pts: Osborn Shema 37; Rebs: Osborn Shema 12; Asts: Ally Kubwimana 10		Pts: Kumbai Ayol 24; Rebs: Kumbai Ayol 15; Asts: Jarode Arowet 5

Lycée de Kigali, Kigali

9 July 2024
6:00 pm

Boxscore

REG	91–76	UGB
Pts: Three players 18; Rebs: Pitchou Kambuy Manga 14; Asts: Antino Jackson 6		Pts: Patrick Rembert 21; Rebs: Nemanja Milošević 9 Asts: Patrick Rembert 9

Kepler University, Kigali

9 July 2024
8:30 pm

Boxscore

Espoir	76–71	Tigers
Pts: Olivier Turatzinse 19; Rebs: Jean de Dieu Niyungeho 11; Asts: Jean de Dieu Niyungeho 7		Pts: Fiston Irutingabo 26; Rebs: Patrick Ngabonziza 11; Asts: Patrick Nshizirungu 4

Kepler University, Kigali

9 July 2024
8:30 pm

Boxscore

Patriots	78–72	Kepler
Pts: Dieudonné Ndizeye 19; Rebs: Furaha Cadeau de Dieu 6 Asts: Will Pery, Sedar Sagamba 4 each		Pts: Done Carlos Alejandro 20; Rebs: Aristide Mugabe, Emile Kazeneza 8 each Asts: Guibert Nijimbere 7

Lycée de Kigali, Kigali

=== Semi-finals ===
7 August 2024
8:30 pm

Boxscore

REG	98–72	Espoir
Pts: Pitchou Kambuy Manga 24; Rebs: Pitchou Kambuy Manga 13; Asts: Antino Alvarez Jackson 16		Pts: Omega Ngaïfei 16; Rebs: Omega Ngaïfei 10; Asts: Omega Ngaïfei 6

Lycée de Kigali, Kigali

7 August 2024
8:30 pm

Boxscore

APR	91–70	Patriots
Pts: Isaiah Miller 24; Rebs: Osborn Shema 11; Asts: Ntore Habimana 7		Pts: Dieudonné Ndizeye 27; Rebs: Dieudonné Ndizeye 10; Asts: Sedar Sagamba 4

Lycée de Kigali, Kigali

=== Third place game ===
9 August 2024
6:00 pm

Boxscore

Patriots	77–59	Espoir
Scoring by quarter: 20–13, 17–11, 16–21, 24–14
Pts: Will Perry 13; Rebs: Dieudonné Ndizeye 7 Asts: Will Perry 8		Pts: Olivier Turatzinse 15; Rebs: Omega Ngaifei 12; Asts: Olivier Turatzinse 5

Lycée de Kigali, Kigali

=== Final ===
9 August 2024
8:30 pm

Boxscore

APR	110–93	REG
Scoring by quarter: 30–25, 24–25, 33–10, 23–32
Pts: Isaiah Miller 43; Rebs: Osborn Shema 9 Asts: Jean Jacques Nshobozwa 4		Pts: Alvarez Jackson 30; Rebs: Kendall Gray 10; Asts: Alvarez Jackson 8

Lycée de Kigali, Kigali
Referees: Didier Gaga, Leslie Cherubin, Didier Shema

== See also ==
- 2024 RBL season
