= 2026 RBL season =

49th season of the Rwanda Basketball League

- League: Rwanda Basketball League
- Season: 2026
- Duration: 6 February 2026 – 24 August 2026
- Number of teams: 9

Regular season
- Regular season champions: APR
- RBL champions: APR
- Top seed: APR
- Basketball Africa League: APR
- Season MVP: Garba Chingka Kennedy
- Promoted: East Africa University Rwanda
- Relegated: Inspired Generation

Playoffs
- Champions: APR
- Runners-up: Patriots
- Third place: RSSB Tigers
- Fourth place: REG
- Playoffs MVP: Craig Randall II

Awards
- Best Defender: Garba Chingka Kennedy
- Best Scorer: Damaria Franklin
- Coach of the Year: Sunny Niyomugabo
- Best 3-Point Shooter: Elliot Cole
- Most Improved Player: Hubert Sage

Statistical leaders
| Points | Damaria Franklin | 383 |
| Rebounds | Garba Chingka Kennedy | 202 |
| Assists | Antino Alvalezes Jackson | 111 |
| Steals | Patrick Nshizirungu | 38 |
| Blocks | Garba Chingka Kennedy | 35 |
| Efficiency | Amotoe James Kofi | 343 |

Seasons
- ← 2025 2027 →
- All statistics correct as of 1 September 2026.

The 2026 RBL season was the 49th season of the Rwanda Basketball League (RBL), and the fifth season of the league under its current name. The league was organised by the FERWABA. The regular season began on 6 February 2026 and concluded on 24 July 2026. The playoffs began on 5 August 2026 and concluded on 24 August 2026.

APR entered the season as the defending champions after winning their record-extending 16th league title in 2025. APR also finished atop the regular-season standings with a 14–2 record to earn the top seed for the playoffs.

APR went on to win their record-extending 17th RBL championship, defeating Patriots 4–0 in the finals. The title was APR's fourth consecutive championship. APR qualified to represent Rwanda in the Basketball Africa League in the 2027 season.

== League changes ==
East Africa University Rwanda joined the Rwanda Basketball League after earning promotion from the RBL Division 2.

| ▲ Promoted from RBL Division 2 | ▼ Relegated From RBL |
|---|---|
| East Africa University Rwanda | Inspired Generation |

== Teams ==
| Team | Home city | Home arena |
|---|---|---|
| APR | Kigali | BK Arena |
| Patriots | Kigali | BK Arena |
| REG | Kigali | BK Arena |
| Tigers | Kigali | Petit Stade |
| Kepler | Kigali | Kepler Court |
| United Generations Basketball | Kigali | Petit Stade |
| East Africa University Rwanda | Kigali | Petit Stade |
| Azomco | Kigali | Petit Stade |
| Inspired Generation | Kigali | Petit Stade |

== Regular season ==
The regular season began on 6 February 2026 and concluded on 24 July 2026. Each team played 16 games in a double round-robin format. The top four teams qualified for the playoffs, while the last-placed team was relegated to the RBL Division 2.

=== Standings ===
| Pos | Team | Pld | W | L | PF | PA | PD | Pts | Qualification |
|---|---|---|---|---|---|---|---|---|---|
| 1 | APR | 16 | 14 | 2 | 1515 | 1115 | +400 | 30 | Advance to playoffs |
| 2 | Patriots | 16 | 13 | 3 | 1388 | 1155 | +233 | 29 | Advance to playoffs |
| 3 | REG | 16 | 11 | 5 | 1377 | 1223 | +154 | 27 | Advance to playoffs |
| 4 | Tigers | 16 | 11 | 5 | 1473 | 1197 | +276 | 27 | Advance to playoffs |
| 5 | Kepler | 16 | 7 | 9 | 1266 | 1247 | +19 | 23 | |
| 6 | United Generations Basketball | 16 | 7 | 9 | 1336 | 1313 | +23 | 23 | |
| 7 | East Africa University Rwanda | 16 | 6 | 10 | 1385 | 1432 | −47 | 22 | |
| 8 | Azomco | 16 | 3 | 13 | 1103 | 1467 | −364 | 19 | |
| 9 | Inspired Generation | 16 | 0 | 16 | 889 | 1583 | −694 | 16 | Relegated to Division 2 |

Source: FERWABA

=== Results ===
| Home \ Away | APR | AZO | EAU | IGR | KPL | PTT | REG | TIG | UGB |
|---|---|---|---|---|---|---|---|---|---|
| APR | — | 98–49 | 85–50 | 119–50 | 83–62 | 78–75 | 79–66 | 80–89 | 90–85 |
| AZOMCO | 61–114 | — | 82–81 | 69–64 | 87–100 | 51–85 | 89–97 | 61–100 | 75–87 |
| East Africa University Rwanda | 93–117 | 75–71 | — | 97–67 | 74–92 | 106–104 | 76–93 | 88–107 | 97–106 |
| Inspired Generation | 38–121 | 69–74 | 60–125 | — | 45–88 | 52–87 | 64–98 | 54–109 | 52–90 |
| Kepler BBC | 84–113 | 96–84 | 81–94 | 99–46 | — | 61–65 | 67–70 | 77–73 | 76–79 |
| Patriots | 69–67 | 100–66 | 103–78 | 84–42 | 96–78 | — | 85–78 | 66–86 | 112–64 |
| REG | 78–84 | 86–64 | 86–67 | 116–70 | 96–78 | 65–84 | — | 69–55 | 77–85 |
| Tigers | 82–84 | 120–55 | 115–106 | 95–52 | 85–62 | 85–100 | 86–102 | — | 93–63 |
| UGB | 84–103 | 95–65 | 63–78 | 112–64 | 57–65 | 70–87 | 90–100 | 78–93 | — |

Source: FERWABA
Legend: Blue = home team win; Red = away team win.

== Playoffs ==
Semifinals
1 | APR | 82 | 82 | 96 | 94 | 105 | 3
4 | Tigers | 97 | 79 | 85 | 96 | 78 | 2
2 | Patriots | 84 | 71 | 65 | 72 | 83 | 3
3 | REG | 75 | 74 | 67 | 61 | 79 | 2

Finals
1 | APR | 117 | 94 | 101 | 114 | 4
2 | Patriots | 91 | 87 | 92 | 76 | 0

== Awards and statistics ==
=== Individual awards ===
| Awards | Winner | Team |
|---|---|---|
| Regular Season MVP | Garba Chingka Kennedy | Patriots |
| Playoffs MVP | Craig Randall II | APR |
| Best Defender | Garba Chingka Kennedy | Patriots |
| Best Scorer | Damaria Franklin | Patriots |
| Coach of the Year | Sunny Niyomugabo | Patriots |
| Best 3-Point Shooter | Elliot Cole | REG |
| Most Improved Player | Hubert Sage | Patriots |

=== Individual statistical leaders ===
After the regular season.

| Category | Player | Team | Statistic |
|---|---|---|---|
| Points | Damaria Franklin | Patriots | 383 |
| Rebounds | Garba Chingka Kennedy | Patriots | 202 |
| Assists | Antino Alvalezes Jackson | Tigers BBC | 111 |
| Steals | Patrick Nshizirungu | REG | 38 |
| Blocks | Garba Chingka Kennedy | Patriots | 35 |
| Efficiency | Amotoe James Kofi | United Generations Basketball | 343 |
| Three-pointers made | Uwitonze Justin | APR | 51 |
| Two-pointers made | Amotoe James Kofi | United Generations Basketball | 135 |

== See also ==
- 2026 BAL season
- Rwanda Basketball League
