= 2022 BAL Sahara Conference =

International basketball competition

The Sahara Conference of the 2022 BAL season began on 5 March 2022 and ended on 15 March 2022. In a group of six teams, all team played each other one time. The top four teams in the standings advanced to the 2022 BAL Playoffs.

All games were played in the Dakar Arena in Dakar, Senegal.

== Standings ==
Pos	Team	Pld	W	L	PF	PA	PD	PCT	Qualification	REG	USM	ASS	SLC	CFV	DUC
1	(Rwanda) REG	5	4	1	431	423	+8	.800 (Note: Head-to-head: REG 77–74 US Monastir on 14 March 2022.)	Advance to playoffs	—	77–74	91–87	83–81	—	—
2	(Tunisia) US Monastir	5	4	1	397	355	+42	.800	Advance to playoffs	—	—	—	—	77–71	74–62
3	(Morocco) AS Salé	5	3	2	454	438	+16	.600	Advance to playoffs	—	90–96	—	91–81	95–84	—
4	(Guinea) SLAC	5	2	3	392	394	−2	.400	Advance to playoffs	—	55–76	—	—	90–74	—
5	(Mozambique) Ferroviário da Beira	5	1	4	416	448	−32	.200 (Note: Head-to-head: Ferroviário da Beira 98–92 DUC on 8 March 2022.)		89–94	—	—	—	—	98–92
6	(Senegal) DUC (H)	5	1	4	402	434	−32	.200		92–86	—	86–91	70–85	—	—

Source: BAL, Afrobasket
(H) Hosts

== Games ==
All times are in Greenwich Mean Time (GMT).

=== 5 March ===
In the opening game of the season, SLAC pulled away after the first half behind Chris Crawford who lead his team with 30 points.

5 March 2022	DUC (Senegal)	70–85	(Guinea) SLAC	Dakar
17:30	Scoring by quarter: 24–22, 21–15, 11–32, 14–16
	Pts: Adama Diakhite 17; Rebs: Abel Diop 10; Asts: Thierno Niang 4 PIR: Abdel Diop 19	Boxscore	Pts: Chris Crawford 30; Rebs: Obekpa, Miller Jr. 8 each Asts: Ibrahim Fofana 6 PIR: Chris Crawford 30	Arena: Dakar Arena; Attendance: N/A; Referees: Greg Dandridge, Kalume Tonton Banza, Sara Elsharnouby

=== 6 March ===
6 March 2022	REG (Rwanda)	91–87	(Morocco) AS Salé	Dakar
14:00	Scoring by quarter: 25–27, 21–21, 26–22, 19–17
	Pts: Cleveland Thomas 26; Rebs: Wilson Nshobozwabyosenumukiza 6 Asts: Adonis Filer 14; PIR: Cleveland Thomas 28	Boxscore	Pts: Terrell Stoglin 32; Rebs: Mohammed Chaoui Kouraichi 10; Asts: Khalid Boukichou 4 PIR: Terrell Stoglin 23	Arena: Dakar Arena

6 March 2022	US Monastir (Tunisia)	77–71	(Mozambique) Ferroviário da Beira	Dakar
17:30	Scoring by quarter: 19-17, 16-23, 19-23, 23-18
	Pts: Ater Majok 19; Rebs: Ater Majok 12; Asts: Radhouane Slimane 5 PIR: Ater Majok 32	Boxscore	Pts: Perry, Kennedy 17 each Rebs: Prince Orizu 7 Asts: Jermelle Kennedy 5 PIR: Jermelle Kennedy 21	Arena: Dakar Arena; Attendance: 434

=== 8 March ===
8 March 2022	SLAC (Guinea)	55–76	(Tunisia) US Monastir	Dakar
17:30	Scoring by quarter: 20–24, 5–20, 15–15, 15–17
	Pts: Chris Crawford 15; Rebs: Chris Obekpa 11; Asts: Dane Miller Jr. 4 PIR: Chris Obekpa 20	Boxscore	Pts: Radhouane Slimane 15; Rebs: Ater Majok 14; Asts: Lahyani, Slimane 5 each PIR: Ater Majok 22	Arena: Dakar Arena; Attendance: N/A; Referees: Marcy Williams, Annie Joyce Muchenu, Arnold Moseya

8 March 2022	Ferroviário da Beira (Mozambique)	98–92	(Senegal) DUC	Dakar
21:00	Scoring by quarter: 29–20, 21–33, 29–15, 19–24
	Pts: Jermelle Kennedy 27; Rebs: Jermelle Kennedy 9 Asts: Will Perry 7 PIR: Jermelle Kennedy 35	Boxscore	Pts: Hameed Ali 26; Rebs: Jordan Aboudou 10; Asts: Hameed Ali 6 PIR: Hameed Ali 32	Arena: Dakar Arena; Attendance: 1,000; Referees: Stephanie Barksdale, Sara Elsharnouby, Aboolo Amr

=== 9 March ===
REG's Wilson Nshobozwabyosenumukiza scored a buzzer-beating three point field goal to give his team the edge over SLAC.

9 March 2022	REG (Rwanda)	83–81	(Guinea) SLAC	Dakar
17:30	Scoring by quarter: 22–15, 20–27, 22–21, 19–18
	Pts: Cleveland Thomas 24; Rebs: Dieudonné Ndizeye 8 Asts: Adonis Filer 7 PIR: Cleveland Thomas 20	Boxscore	Pts: Chris Crawford 20; Rebs: Chris Obekpa 14; Asts: Chris Crawford 6 PIR: Chris Obekpa 34	Arena: Dakar Arena; Attendance: 278; Referees: Kenny Jones, Antonio Bernardo, Walelign Fikadu Gebeto

9 March 2022	AS Salé (Morocco)	95–84	(Mozambique) Ferroviário da Beira	Dakar
21:00	Scoring by quarter: 24–23, 23–17, 17–21, 31–13
	Pts: Terrell Stoglin 34; Rebs: Álvaro Calvo Masa 13; Asts: Terrell Stoglin 8 PIR: Terrell Stoglin 32	Boxscore	Pts: Randy Onwuasor 19; Rebs: Jermelle Kennedy 9 Asts: Jermelle Kennedy 7 PIR: Jermelle Kennedy 22	Arena: Dakar Arena; Attendance: 258; Referees: Agon Abazi, Kalume Tonton Banza, Marie Leslie Cherubin

=== 11 March ===
US Monastir won the "Derby of the North", while Terrell Stoglin broke the record for most point in a BAL game with 41 points. The previous record was also set by him, when he scored 40 points on 20 May 2021 in the 2021 season.

11 March 2022	AS Salé (Morocco)	90–96	(Tunisia) US Monastir	Dakar
17:30	Scoring by quarter: 21–32, 18–20, 20–19, 31–25
	Pts: Terrell Stoglin 41; Rebs: Four players 4 Asts: Terrell Stoglin 7 Eff: Terrell Stoglin 36	Boxscore	Pts: Radhouane Slimane 24; Rebs: Ater Majok 12; Asts: Michael Dixon 11; Eff: Radhouane Slimane 27	Arena: Dakar Arena; Attendance: 340; Referees: Kenny Jones, Aboollo Amr, Claudio Eviba

11 March 2022	DUC Dakar (Senegal)	92–86	(Rwanda) REG	Dakar
21:00	Scoring by quarter: 19–16, 21–24, 24–21, 28–25
	Pts: Adama Diakhite 30; Rebs: Adama Diakhite 11; Asts: Hameed Ali 8 Eff: Adama Diakhite 33	Boxscore	Pts: Adonis Filer 23; Rebs: Pitchou Kambuy Manga 7 Asts: Adonis Filer 5 Eff: Adonis Filer 21	Arena: Dakar Arena; Attendance: 2,500; Referees: Agon Abazi, Wael Mostafa, Arnold Moseya

=== 12 March ===
12 March 2022	SLAC (Guinea)	90–74	(Mozambique) Ferroviário da Beira	Dakar
14:00	Scoring by quarter: 21–15, 30–21, 16–18, 23–20
	Pts: Chris Crawford 23; Rebs: Chris Obekpa 12; Asts: Dane Miller Jr. 8 PIR: Chris Obekpa 29	Boxscore	Pts: Ismael Nurmamade 14; Rebs: Jermelle Kennedy 12; Asts: Kennedy, Perry 5 each PIR: Kennedy 18	Arena: Dakar Arena; Attendance: N/A; Referees: Greg Dandridge, Walelign Fikadu Gebeto, Kalume Tonton Banza

12 March 2022	US Monastir (Tunisia)	74–62	(Senegal) DUC	Dakar
17:30	Scoring by quarter: 20-20, 15-11, 19-17, 20-14
	Pts: Ater Majok 20; Rebs: Ater Majok 13; Asts: Radhouane Slimane 8 PIR: Ater Majok 30	Boxscore	Pts: Bamba Diallo 19; Rebs: Abel Diop 9 Asts: Hameed Ali 7 PIR: Bamba Diallo 15	Arena: Dakar Arena; Attendance: 2,000; Referees: Stephanie Barksdale, Wael Ibrahim Mostafa, Euiba Claudio

=== 14 March ===
14 March 2022	REG (Rwanda)	77–74	(Tunisia) US Monastir	Dakar
17:30	Scoring by quarter: 21–26, 15–16, 20–13, 21–19
	Pts: Pitchou Kambuy Manga 16; Rebs: Pitchou Kambuy Manga 10; Asts: Adonis Filer 9 PIR: Pitchou Kambuy Manga 23	Boxscore	Pts: Michael Dixon 23; Rebs: Ater Majok 14; Asts: Oussama Marnaoui 6 PIR: Ater Majok 23	Arena: Dakar Arena; Attendance: 400; Referees: Marcy Williams, Aboolo Amr, Arnold Moseya

14 March 2022	AS Salé (Morocco)	91–81	(Guinea) SLAC	Dakar
21:00	Scoring by quarter: 20–20, 20–20, 23–20, 28–21
	Pts: Terrell Stoglin 29; Rebs: Álvaro Calvo Masa 12; Asts: Terrell Stoglin 5 PIR: Calvo Masa, Stoglin 20 each	Boxscore	Pts: Chris Crawford 19; Rebs: Mohamed Lamine Keita 13; Asts: Chris Crawford 6 PIR: Chris Crawford 21	Arena: Dakar Arena; Attendance: 845; Referees: Agon Abazi, Antonio Bernardo, Annie Joyce Muchenu

=== 15 March ===
15 March 2022	Ferroviário da Beira (Mozambique)	89–94	(Rwanda) REG	Dakar
17:30	Scoring by quarter: 17–20, 21–28, 23–18, 28–28
	Pts: Munguambe, Ubisse 17 each Rebs: Jermelle Kennedy 7 Asts: Kennedy, Onwuasor 4 each PIR: Ayade Munguambe 16	Boxscore	Pts: Wilson Nshobozwabyosenumukiza 28; Rebs: Dieudonné Ndizeye 13; Asts: Adonis Filer 12; PIR: Ndizeye, Thomas 31 each	Arena: Dakar Arena; Attendance: 369; Referees: Stephanie Barksdale, Wael Ibrahim Mostafa, Walelign Fikadu Gebeto

15 March 2022	DUC (Senegal)	86–91	(Morocco) AS Salé	Dakar
21:00	Scoring by quarter: 28–26, 11–22, 27–17, 20–26
	Pts: Bamba Diallo 30; Rebs: Abel Diop 9 Asts: Hameed Ali 15; PIR: Hameed Ali 29	Boxscore	Pts: Terrell Stoglin 30; Rebs: Álvaro Calvo Masa 14; Asts: Three players 4 each PIR: Álvaro Calvo Masa 27	Arena: Dakar Arena; Attendance: 3,000; Referees: Greg Dandridge, Sara Elsharnouby, Euiba Claudio
