= Ntore Habimana =

Rwandan basketball player (born 1997)

No. 15 – RSSB Tigers
- Position: Point guard
- League: Rwanda Basketball League; BAL

Personal information
- Born: August 15, 1997 (age 29) Mississauga, Ontario, Canada
- Listed height: 6 ft 5 in (1.96 m)
- Listed weight: 185 lb (84 kg)

Career information
- College: Wilfrid Laurier (2016–2021)
- Playing career: 2022–present

Career history
- 2022: REG
- 2022: Edmonton Stingers
- 2022–2026: APR
- 2026–present: RSSB Tigers

Career highlights
- BAL champion (2026); 4× RBL champion (2022, 2023, 2024, 2025)
Medals
Men's basketball
Representing Rwanda
FIBA AfroCan
Bronze medal – third place	Angola 2023

Ntore Habimana (born August 15, 1997) is a Canadian-born Rwandan basketball player for the APR of the Rwanda Basketball League (RBL). He is a member of the Rwanda national team. His position has been described as a point forward.

== Early life ==
Habimana was born in Mississauga, Ontario to a Rwandan father and Burundian mother, who had moved to Canada in 1994. As a kid, he idolized Vince Carter.

== College career ==
Habimana played five seasons of U Sports men's basketball for the Wilfrid Laurier Golden Hawks and averaged 10.1 points in his final season. On February 18, 2020, he had a career-high 20 points against the Waterloo Warriors.

== Professional career ==
On March 2, 2022, Habimana signed his first professional contract with REG BBC of the Rwanda Basketball League (RBL) and the Basketball Africa League (BAL). He was not on the roster for the 2022 BAL Playoffs. Habimana won the 2022 RBL championship with REG.

On July 22, 2022, Habimana signed with the Edmonton Stingers.

On October 6, 2022, he signed a 2-year contract with APR. He was on APR's roster that finished in third place in the 2025 BAL season.

== National team career ==
Since 2021, Habimana is a member of the Rwanda men's national basketball team. He won a bronze medal at the 2023 FIBA AfroCan in Angola, the first-ever podium finish for the country.

== Honours ==
APR

- Basketball Africa League third place: 2025
- Rwanda Basketball League: 2023, 2024

REG

- Rwanda Basketball League: 2022
