= List of Basketball Africa League single-game scoring leaders =

This is a listing of the Basketball Africa League (BAL) players who have scored the most points in a single game. The current record is held by Craig Randall II, who scored 54 points in a group stage game on 4 April 2026.

== Single-game leaders ==
Key
^	Denotes player who is currently active in the BAL
	Player's team lost the game

Rank	Points	Player	Date	Team	Opponent	Score	MP	FGM	FGA	3PM	3PA	FTM	FTA	Ref.
1	54	Craig Randall II	4 April 2026	RSSB Tigers	Dar City	104–92	38	18	36	11	24	7	7	
2	43	Craig Randall II	24 May 2026	RSSB Tigers	FUS Rabat	98–99	40	13	34	9	25	8	10	
3	42	Jo Lual-Acuil^	27 April 2024	Al Ahly Ly	City Oilers	110–78	40	20	28	0	0	2	2	
4	41	Terrell Stoglin^	12 March 2022	AS Salé	US Monastir	90–96	40	12	23	3	6	11	13	
4	41	Will Perry^	30 April 2023	Ferroviário da Beira	SLAC	109–97	40	20	32	9	14	10	10	
6	40	Terrell Stoglin^	21 May 2021	AS Salé	AS Police	88–79	35	14	31	3	11	9	11	
7	39	David Michineau	March 28, 2026	Dar City	Nairobi City Thunder	90–85	40	13	23	3	4	10	12	
7	39	Craig Randall II	April 1, 2026	RSSB Tigers	Johannesburg Giants	102–89	38	10	22	5	15	14	18	
7	39	Teafale Lenard	May 24, 2025	MBB	Nairobi City Thunder	75–85	39	11	24	5	10	12	16	
10	38	Cleveland Thomas^	20 May 2023	REG	US Monastir	79–84	38	13	21	4	8	8	8	
11	35	Abdoulaye Harouna	5 May 2024	AS Douanes	US Monastir	76–59	37	10	23	8	17	7	11	
12	34	Souleymane Berthé^	12 March 2023	Stade Malien	US Monastir	78–68	35	12	24	5	15	5	6	
12	34	Terrell Stoglin^	9 March 2022	AS Salé	Ferroviário da Beira	95–84	37	12	20	4	9	11	13	
12	34	Carlos Morais	5 May 2022	Petro de Luanda	Al Ahly	91–90	36	14	24	8	12	4	7	
15	33	Josh Nzeakor	21 May 2021	AS Police	AS Salé	79–88	33	14	21	1	1	7	8	
15	33	Abdellah Hamdini	22 May 2021	GS Pétroliers	Ferroviário de Maputo	73–86	28	13	24	4	8	3	3	
15	33	Abdoulaye Harouna^	17 March 2023	ABC Fighters	US Monastir	90–74	39	12	24	4	12	5	6	

== Playoffs game leaders ==
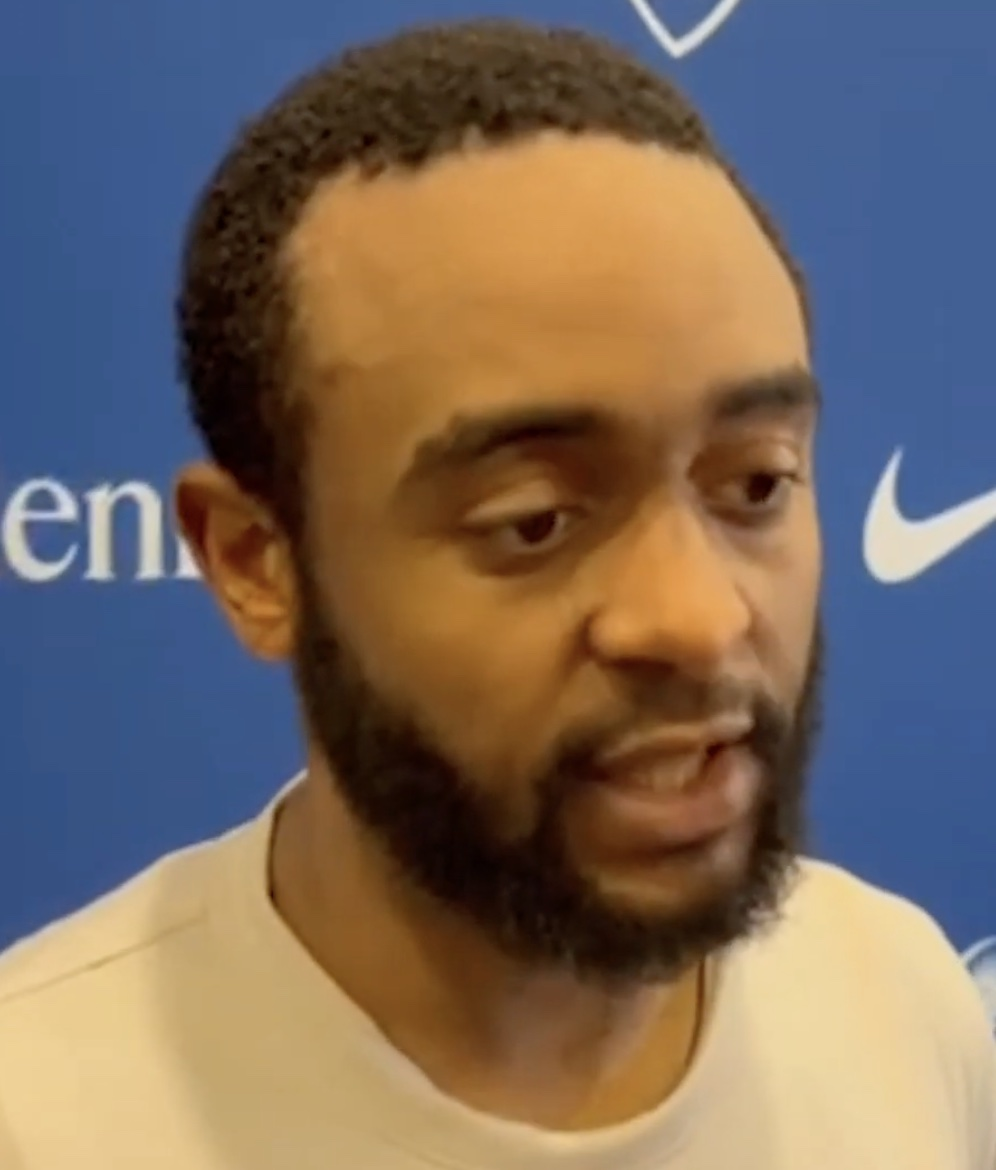
Gerson Gonçalves scored 28 points in the 2022 BAL Finals

Key
^	Denotes player who is currently active in the BAL
	Player's team lost the game
	Finals game

Rank	Points	Player	Date	Team	Round	Opponent	Score	MP	FGM	FGA	3PM	3PA	FTM	FTA	Ref.
1	43	Craig Randall II	24 May 2026	RSSB Tigers	Quarter-finals	FUS Rabat	98–99	40	13	34	9	25	8	10	
2	38	Craig Randall II	22 May 2026	RSSB Tigers	Quarter-finals	FUS Rabat	95–72	36	11	28	6	19	10	10	
3	36	Zach Lofton	27 May 2026	Al Ahly	Semi-finals	RSSB Tigers	97–106	38	12	25	7	15	5	6	
4	34	Fabian White Jr.	8 June 2025	Al Ahly Tripoli	Quarter-finals	Kriol Star	107–81	33	15	26	3	7	1	2	
5	33	Craig Randall II	22 May 2026	RSSB Tigers	Finals	Petro de Luanda	90–88	40	8	25	6	18	11	13	
6	30	Terrell Stoglin^	26 May 2022	AS Salé	Quarter-finals	Petro de Luanda	90–96	36	9	19	2	8	10	11	
7	28	Gerson Gonçalves^	28 May 2022	Petro de Luanda	Finals	US Monastir	72–83	32	10	13	5	5	5	8	
7	28	Jean Jacques Boissy	24 May 2023	AS Douanes	Semi-finals	Petro de Luanda	92–86	26	5	17	3	6	11	12	
9	26	Mikh McKinney	26 May 2022	Zamalek	Semi-finals	US Monastir	88–81	24	6	10	2	3	12	13	
9	26	Adonis Filer	20 May 2023	REG	Quarter-finals	Al Ahly	94–77	38	9	19	3	9	5	5	
