= Jean Jacques Nshobozwabyosenumukiza =

Rwandan basketball player (born 1998)

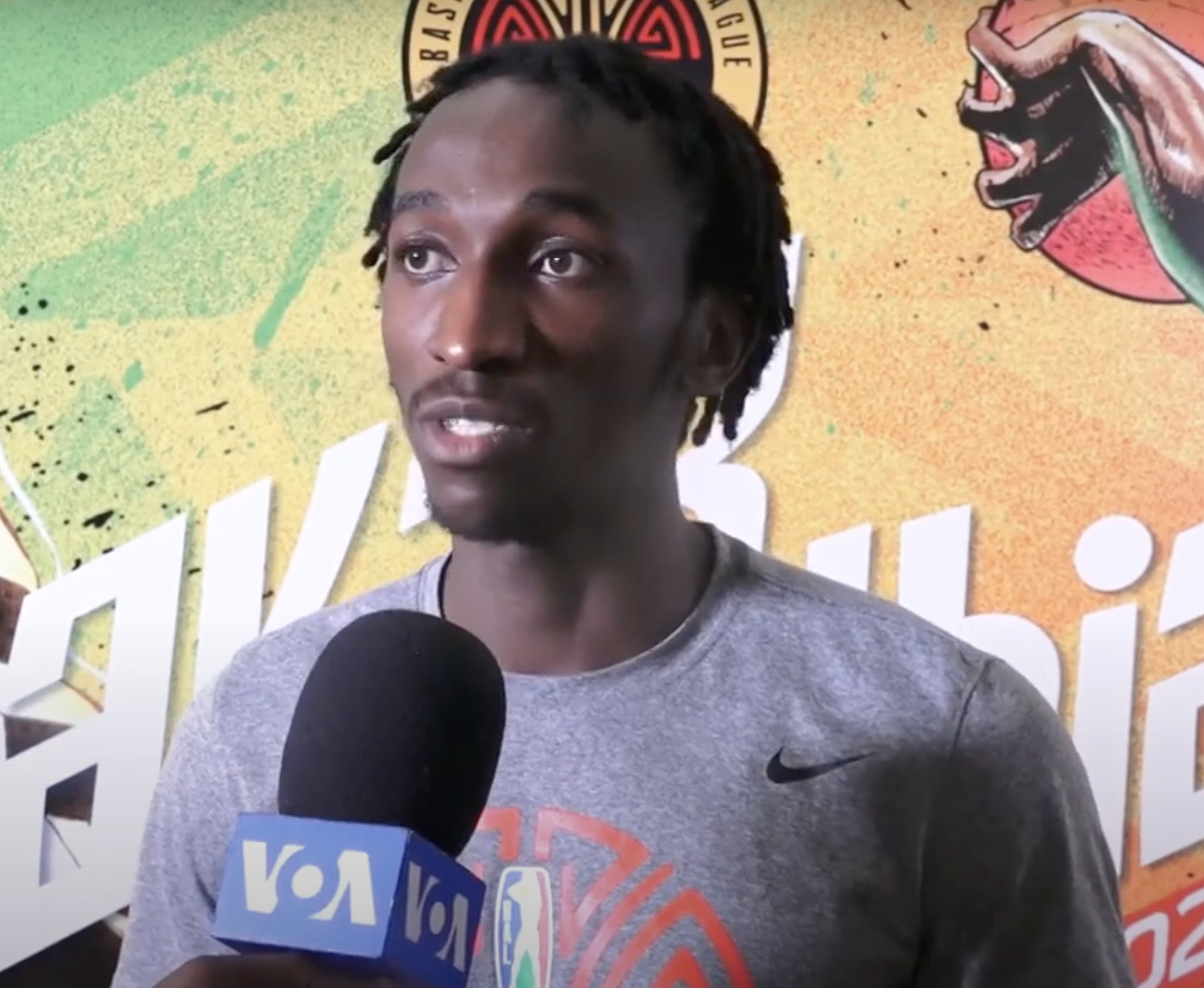
- Nshobozwabyosenumukiza during an interview in 2023

No. 11 – APR
- Position: Point guard
- League: NBL Rwanda; BAL

Personal information
- Born: 26 June 1998 (age 28) Kigali, Rwanda
- Listed height: 1.83 m (6 ft 0 in)

Career information
- Playing career: 2016–present

Career history
- 2016–2018: Espoir
- 2018–2022: REG
- 2021: →Patriots
- 2022–present: APR
- 2023–present: →REG

Career highlights
- BAL All-Defensive Team (2022); BAL Ubuntu Award (2022); 3× RBL champion (2021–2023); RBL Playoffs MVP (2023); 2× Rwandan Cup winner (2019, 2020)
Medals
Men's basketball
Representing Rwanda
FIBA AfroCan
Bronze medal – third place	Angola 2023
3x3 basketball
Representing Rwanda
FIBA 3x3 Africa Cup
Bronze medal – third place	Cairo 2022

Jean Jacques "J. J." Wilson Nshobozwabyosenumukiza (born 26 June 1998) is a Rwandan basketball player who currently plays for REG on loan from APR of the Rwanda Basketball League (RBL). He is also a member of the Rwanda national basketball team.

== Early life ==
Born in the Nyarugenge District of Kigali, the capital of Rwanda. Nshobozwabyosenumukiza's role model was NBA player Kyrie Irving.

== Club career ==
After an impressive performance at the 2016 FIBA Africa Under-18 Championship, Nshobozwabyosenumukiza was recruited by most top teams from the NBL Rwanda. He decided to join Espoir BBC, his dream team since his childhood, in 2016 and immediately became a starter for the team.

In 2018, Nshobozwabyosenumukiza became a member of REG BBC, a newly established team in Rwanda. He was sent on loan to play for Patriots BBC ahead of the inaugural season of the BAL. He came off the bench for the Patriots, averaging 3.3 points in 12.1 minutes per game.

Nshobozwabyosenumukiza returned to REG and joined the team for the 2022 BAL season. On 9 March 2022, he scored a buzzer-beating three pointer to give his team the 82–80 win over SLAC, while also adding 15 points. On 14 March, he scored a BAL career-high 28 points, including 8 three point field goals, in a win over Beira. On 27 May, he was named to the BAL All-Defensive Team, and later he also won the Ubuntu Award for his contributions to his community by helping Club Rafiki.

On October 6, 2022, Nshobozwabyosenumukiza signed a 2-year contract with APR. He rejoined REG for the 2023 BAL season, signing a temporary agreement with the team. He rejoined APR afterwards, and led the team to their first league championship in 14 years, following their sweep over his former team REG in the finals. Nshobozwa was named the Playoffs MVP, following his averages of 13.2 points and 2.1 steals per game.

== National team career ==
Nshobozwabyosenumukiza was selected for the Rwanda U-16 national team in 2015, and later also played for the U-18 team.

Nshobozwabyosenumukiza represents the Rwandan national basketball team. On 22 March 2021, Wilson broke the world record for most steals when he had 14 steals in a qualification game against South Sudan. He won a bronze medal at the 2023 FIBA AfroCan, Rwanda's first-ever podium finish at an international tournament.

=== 3x3 basketball ===
On December 4, 2022, Nshobozwabyosenumukiza won a bronze medal at the FIBA 3x3 Africa Cup and was named to the Team of the Tournament.

== BAL career statistics ==
Legend
GP	Games played	GS	Games started	MPG	Minutes per game
FG%	Field goal percentage	3P%	3-point field goal percentage	FT%	Free throw percentage
RPG	Rebounds per game	APG	Assists per game	SPG	Steals per game
BPG	Blocks per game	PPG	Points per game	**Bold**	Career high

Year	Team	GP	GS	MPG	FG%	3P%	FT%	RPG	APG	SPG	BPG	PPG
2021	Patriots	6	**1**	12.3	.350	.444	.667	2.5	1.2	1.2	.0	3.3
2022	REG	6	0	**24.7**	**.412**	**.436**	.750	5.2	**3.8**	**1.7**	.2	**13.7**
2023	REG	6	0	20.5	.280	.229	–	**5.8**	1.7	1.5	.2	6.0
2024	APR	6	**1**	19.4	.229	.219	**1.000**	3.2	1.3	**2.2**	.0	5.2

== Personal ==
Wilson is a Christian. Nshobozwabyosenumukiza has received attention for his long surname, which he says means "I am able to do everything because of God". He is active for Club Rafiki (CR), where he helps children and young adults integrate in society through basketball.

== Awards and accomplishments ==
=== Club ===
APR

- Basketball Africa League third place: (2025)
- Rwanda Basketball League: (2024)
- Rwanda Cup: (2024)
- Rwanda Supercup: (2024)

REG

- 2× Rwanda Basketball League: (2021, 2022)
- 2× Heroes Cup: (2019, 2020)

=== Individual ===
- BAL All-Defensive Team: (2022)
- 2× RBL All-Star: (2021, 2022)
