= Craig Randall II =

American basketball player

No. 12 – APR
- Position: Shooting guard
- League: Rwanda Basketball League

Personal information
- Born: April 22, 1996 (age 30) Youngstown, Ohio, U.S.
- Listed height: 6 ft 4 in (1.93 m)
- Listed weight: 185 lb (84 kg)

Career information
- High school: Girard (Girard, Ohio); Medina (Medina, Ohio); Shadow Mountain (Phoenix, Arizona)
- College: Memphis (2015–2017); UT Martin (2019–2020)
- NBA draft: 2020: undrafted
- Playing career: 2021–present

Career history
- 2021–2022: Long Island Nets
- 2022: Adelaide 36ers
- 2023: Iowa Wolves
- 2023–2024: Cholet Basket
- 2024–2025: Ningbo Rockets
- 2025: Rip City Remix
- 2025: Wisconsin Herd
- 2026: RSSB Tigers
- 2026–present: APR

Career highlights
- BAL champion (2026); BAL Most Valuable Player (2026); All-BAL First Team (2026); NBA G League Most Improved Player (2022)

Leonard Craig Randall II (born April 22, 1996) is an American professional basketball player for APR BBC of the Rwanda Basketball League (RBL). He played college basketball for the Memphis Tigers and the UT Martin Skyhawks.

== High school career ==
Randall began his high school career at Girard High School, averaging 23.4 points per game as a sophomore. For his junior season he transferred to Medina High School. Randall averaged 20.3 points, 5.1 rebounds and 4.4 assists per game for a team that finished 19–7 and appeared in the Copley Division I district title game. He moved to Arizona before his senior season after his father found a new job and enrolled at Shadow Mountain High School, playing under coach Mike Bibby. Randall scored a season-high 36 points against Copper Canyon High School. He averaged 21.2 points, 5.6 assists, 4.7 rebounds and 2.5 steals per game and led the team to a 23–7 record while earning PrepHoopsArizona.com Division II Player of the Year honors. Randall was rated a three-star recruit and committed to playing college basketball for Memphis.

== College career ==
Randall struggled during his freshman year at Memphis, averaging 2.2 points per game and shooting 18.6 percent from three-point range. He scored 21 points against Savannah State on November 19, 2016. As a sophomore, Randall averaged 5.2 points per game. Following the season, he opted to transfer to Duquesne and sit out a season per NCAA regulations. In January 2019, Randall joined UT Martin as a midseason transfer. He averaged 16.3 points and 3.6 rebounds per game as a junior. As a senior, Randall averaged 12.9 points and 2.7 rebounds per game.

== Professional career ==
=== Long Island Nets (2021–2022) ===
After going undrafted in the 2020 NBA draft, Randall had difficulty finding a professional team to sign with overseas due to the COVID-19 pandemic and opted to remain in the U.S. and work on his game.

In October 2021, Randall joined the Long Island Nets of the NBA G League after a successful tryout. On January 5, 2022, he scored 40 points in a win over the College Park Skyhawks, then followed it with another 40-point effort in a loss to the Greensboro Swarm, becoming the first Long Island Nets player to record consecutive 40 point games. On April 11, 2022, he was named the NBA G League Most Improved Player.

Randall joined the Portland Trail Blazers for the 2022 NBA Summer League.

=== Adelaide 36ers (2022) ===
On August 8, 2022, Randall signed with the Adelaide 36ers of the Australian National Basketball League (NBL) for the 2022–23 season. On October 3, 2022, he led the 36ers to a preseason win against the Phoenix Suns with his 35 points being the most by an NBL player against an NBA team. The 36ers entered the season with championship expectations, but amassed a 3–4 record in their first month. Randall was frequently seen arguing with head coach C. J. Bruton and his teammates during games which caused chemistry issues. He was released by the 36ers on November 8, 2022, with the team stating that it was by "mutual consent". At the time of his release, Randall was the 36ers' leading scorer and ranked fourth in the NBL with 20.3 points per game.

=== Iowa Wolves (2023) ===
On January 28, 2023, Randall's NBA G League rights were traded from the Long Island Nets to the Iowa Wolves in exchange for Derrick Alston Jr. On February 2, 2023, Randall was acquired by the Iowa Wolves.

On September 29, 2023, Randall signed with Hapoel Haifa of the Ligat HaAl. He did not join the team due to the outbreak of the Gaza war.

=== Cholet Basket (2023–2024) ===
On November 30, 2023, Randall signed with Cholet Basket of the LNB Élite. He appeared in nine LNB Élite games where he averaged 16.1 points per game. He also appeared in seven Basketball Champions League games where he averaged 18.9 points per game. On February 21, 2024, Randall was released from his remaining contract by mutual agreement.

On March 14, 2024, Randall signed with the Indios de Mayagüez, but left the team on March 27 due to personal commitments.

=== Ningbo Rockets and Rip City Remix (2024–2025) ===
Randall started the 2024–25 season with the Ningbo Rockets of the Chinese Basketball Association (CBA) where he averaged 5.4 points per game. He ended the season with the Rip City Remix of the NBA G League and averaged 21.4 points per game.

On August 13, 2025, Randall signed a contract with the Russian club Enisey of the VTB United League. On September 4, 2025, Enisey terminated its contract with Randall after he failed to undergo a medical examination.

=== Wisconsin Herd (2025) ===
On November 7, 2025, Randall was named to the Wisconsin Herd opening night roster.

=== Rwanda (2026–present) ===
In February 2026, Randall signed with APR of the Rwanda Basketball League (RBL) and Basketball Africa League (BAL) for the 2026 season. APR was later forced to withdraw from the BAL season, and was replaced by RSSB Tigers, which then became Randall's team. On April 4, 2026, Randall set an all-time record for most points in a BAL game, after scoring 54 points from 18-from-36 shooting from the score. He also hit a record 11 three-pointers, guiding the Tigers to a 104–92 win over Dar City. Randall went on to lead the Tigers to their first BAL championship. He led the league in scoring with 36 points per game, and was subsequently also named the MVP.

Randall left the Tigers after the BAL season, but on July 22, re-signed with his former team APR to join for the 2026 RBL season playoffs.

== Career statistics ==
Legend
GP	Games played	GS	Games started	MPG	Minutes per game
FG%	Field goal percentage	3P%	3-point field goal percentage	FT%	Free throw percentage
RPG	Rebounds per game	APG	Assists per game	SPG	Steals per game
BPG	Blocks per game	PPG	Points per game	**Bold**	Career high

=== College ===
Year	Team	GP	GS	MPG	FG%	3P%	FT%	RPG	APG	SPG	BPG	PPG
2015–16	Memphis	24	5	7.5	.278	.186	.500	1.3	.5	.3	.1	2.2
2016–17	Memphis	**32**	0	18.1	.349	.288	.517	1.4	1.0	.6	**.2**	5.2
2017–18	Duquesne	Redshirt										
2018–19	UT Martin	12	**10**	**33.8**	**.436**	**.344**	**.846**	**3.6**	**2.5**	**1.1**	**.2**	**16.3**
2019–20	UT Martin	9	8	27.3	.383	.317	.600	2.7	2.4	.8	.1	12.9
Career		77	23	18.3	.374	.296	.641	1.9	1.2	.6	.1	6.9

== Personal life ==
Randall's father L. Craig scored 1,503 career points at Westminster College while his mother Karla played collegiately at Kent State. His brother Lance played college basketball at Thiel College, while his brother Kyle played at Central Michigan before playing professionally in the G League.
