= 2024 RBL season =

2024 season of the Rwanda Basketball League

- Association: FERWABA
- League: Rwanda Basketball League
- Sport: Basketball
- Duration: 9 February – 23 August 2024 (regular season); 30 August – 23 September 2024 (playoffs)
- Teams: 10

Regular season
- Top seed: Patriots
- Season MVP: Chad Bowie Jordan (Kepler)
- Top scorer: Chad Bowie Jordan (Kepler)

Playoffs
- Playoffs MVP: Isaiah Miller (APR)
- Finals champions: APR (15th title)
- Runners-up: Patriots

Seasons
- ← 2023 2025 →

The 2024 RBL season was the 3rd season of the Rwanda Basketball League under its current name, while the top-level competition has been organised by the FERWABA for a longer time. The regular season began on 9 February and ended on 23 August 2024. The playoffs began on 30 August and ended on 23 September 2024.

APR won its record-extending fifteenth national title after their finals win over Patriots.

== Team changes ==
| ▲ Promoted from 2023 RBL D2 | ▼ Relegated from 2023 RBL season |
|---|---|
| Kepler; Inspired Generation | RP-IPRC Huye; IPRC-Kigali; Shoot for the Stars; RP-IPRC Musanze |

== Regular season ==
The number of teams in the regular season was decreased from twelve to ten. This season, two teams are relegated to the Division 2.

=== Standings ===
| Pos | Team | Pld | W | L | GF | GA | GD | Pts | Qualification |
|---|---|---|---|---|---|---|---|---|---|
| 1 | Patriots | 18 | 17 | 1 | 1532 | 1161 | +371 | 35 | Advance to playoffs |
| 2 | APR | 18 | 16 | 2 | 1713 | 1244 | +469 | 34 | Advance to playoffs |
| 3 | REG | 18 | 14 | 4 | 1637 | 1269 | +368 | 32 | Advance to playoffs |
| 4 | Kepler | 18 | 10 | 8 | 1457 | 1415 | +42 | 28 | Advance to playoffs |
| 5 | Espoir | 18 | 9 | 9 | 1450 | 1401 | +49 | 27 | |
| 6 | UGB | 18 | 8 | 10 | 1458 | 1382 | +76 | 26 | |
| 7 | Tigers | 18 | 8 | 10 | 1388 | 1381 | +7 | 26 | |
| 8 | Orion | 18 | 5 | 13 | 1202 | 1498 | −296 | 23 | |
| 9 | Inspired Generation (R) | 18 | 1 | 17 | 1070 | 1676 | −606 | 19 | Relegated to Division 2 |
| 10 | Kigali Titans (R) | 18 | 2 | 16 | 1058 | 1538 | −480 | 19 (Note: The Kigali Titans forfeited one game and were given zero points for this technical loss.) | Relegated to Division 2 |

Source: FERWABA (archived)
(R) Relegated

== Playoffs ==
The renovated 1,000-seater Petit Stade hosts the first and second games of the semifinals, which are played in a best-of-three format. The remainder of the tournament is played at the BK Arena.

Semifinals
1 | Patriots | 3
4 | Kepler | 0
2 | APR | 3
3 | REG | 0

Finals
1 | Patriots | 2
2 | APR | 4
Third place
4 | Kepler | 0
3 | REG | 2

== Awards and statistics ==
=== Individual statistical leaders ===
After the regular season.

| Category | Player | Team(s) | Statistic |
|---|---|---|---|
| Points | Chad Bowie Jordan | Kepler | 361 |
| Rebounds | Chijioke Francis Azolibe | Tigers | 168 |
| Assists | Ntore Habimana | APR | 119 |
| Steals | Jean de Dieu Niyungeho | Espoir | 55 |
| Blocks | Fabrice Muhoza | Espoir | 59 |
| Efficiency | Pitchou Kambuy Manga | REG | 373 |
| Three-pointers made | Chad Bowie Jordan | Kepler | 49 |
| Two-points made | Pitchou Kambuy Manga | REG | 105 |
