= Maz Trakh =

Jordanian-American basketball coach (born 1967)

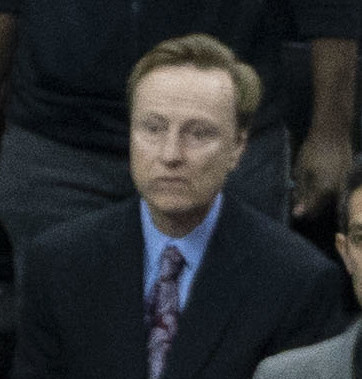
- Trakh in 2018

APR
- Position: Head coach
- League: Rwanda Basketball League

Personal information
- Born: July 3, 1962 (age 64) Amman, Jordan

Career information
- High school: La Quinta (Westminster, California)
- College: Southern Utah (1983–1986)

Career history

Coaching
- ?–?: Long Beach State (assistant)
- 1989–1993: Riverside CC (assistant)
- 1994–1996: UC Irvine (assistant)
- 2000–2001: Cabrillo College
- 2002–2004: Yakima Sun Kings (assistant)
- 2004: Yakima Sun Kings
- 2004: Changwon LG Sakers (assistant)
- 2004–2006: Fastlink
- 2006–2007: Blue Stars
- 2010–2013: Oklahoma City Thunder (assistant)
- 2013–2014: Detroit Pistons (assistant)
- 2014–2015: Al-Muharraq
- 2016–2019: Washington Wizards (assistant)
- 2023–2024: APR

Career highlights
- As head coach: RBL champion (2023); RBL Coach of the Year (2023); Rwanda Cup winner (2024); FIBA Asia Champions Cup (2006); 3× Jordan League champion (2004–2006); As assistant coach: CBA champion (2003); NBA All-Star Game (2012)

Mazen "Maz" Trakh (born July 3, 1962) is a Jordanian-American professional basketball coach who was the head coach for APR BBC of the Rwanda Basketball League. Trakh previously coached in the National Basketball Association (NBA), Continental Basketball Association (CBA), American Basketball Association (ABA) and overseas.

== Playing career ==
Trakh attended La Quinta High School in Westminster, California, where he was a teammate on the basketball team with Johnny Rogers. He played college basketball for the Southern Utah Thunderbirds from 1983 to 1986.

== Coaching career ==
Trakh served as an assistant coach at Riverside Community College from 1989 to 1993 and for the UC Irvine Anteaters from 1994 to 1996.

Trakh helped lead Jordanian club Fastlink to the 2006 FIBA Asia Club Championship. His team became the first Jordanian team to ever win the championship.

In 2023, Trakh became part of the Rwanda Basketball League (RBL) for APR. He guided APR to the national championship in the 2023 RBL season, while being named Coach of the Year as well. He won the 2024 Rwanda Cup as well.

=== NBA ===
Trakh began working with the Oklahoma City Thunder prior to the 2010–11 season, serving as the assistant coach focusing on player development for three seasons.

Trakh was an assistant coach for the Detroit Pistons during the 2013–14 season under coach Maurice Cheeks.

Trakh served as the west coast advance scout for the Golden State Warriors during the 2015–16 season.

At the beginning of the 2016–17 season, the Washington Wizards added Trakh to their coaching staff as assistant coach.

== Personal life ==
Trakh's older brother Mark is also a basketball coach.

== Head coaching record ==
Legend
Regular season	G	Games coached	W	Games won	L	Games lost	W–L %	Win–loss %
Playoffs	PG	Playoff games	PW	Playoff wins	PL	Playoff losses	PW–L %	Playoff win–loss %

Team	Year	G	W	L	W–L%	Finish	PG	PW	PL	PW–L%	Result
APR	2024	6	2	4	.333	4th in Sahara Conference	–	–	–	–	Did not qualify

== See also ==
- List of foreign NBA coaches
