= Orion BBC =

Orion
- League: Rwanda Basketball League
- Established: 2022
- History: Orion BBC (2022–present)
- Location: Kigali, Rwanda
- President: James Mutabazi
- Head coach: Buhake Albert

Orion Basketball Club is a Rwandan semi-professional basketball team based in Kigali. They play in the Rwanda Basketball League (RBL). Orion was founded in 2022 and started playing in the Division 2 and was immediately promoted to the top flight league.

The club was founded by James Mutabazi. Other investors include Jarred Harrington. The name of the club means "the rising and shining of the Star".

== Head coaches ==
- Buhake Albert: (2022–present)

== Season by season ==
Season	Tier	League	Pos.	Record	Play-offs	Heroes Cup
2021–22	2	RBL Division 2	2nd ▲	–	Runner-up	–
2023	1	RBL Division 1	6th	12–10	–	–
2024	1	RBL Division 1	8th	5–13	–	–
2025	1	RBL Division 1	6th	12–10	–	–
