= 2025 RBL season =

49th season of the Rwanda Basketball League

- League: Rwanda Basketball League
- Season: 2025
- Duration: January 24 – July 12, 2025
- Number of teams: 9

Regular season
- Top seed: APR
- Relegated: Espoir

Finals
- Champions: APR (16th title)
- Runners-up: REG
- Third place: UGB
- Fourth place: Patriots
- Playoffs MVP: Youssou Ndoye (APR)

Statistical leaders
Points	Mwanawabene Fortunat	316

Seasons
- ← 2024 2026 →
- All statistics correct as of 6 July 2025.

The 2025 RBL season was the 48th season of the Rwanda Basketball League (RBL), and the 4th season of the league under its current name. The league was organized by the FERWABA. The regular season began on January 24, 2025, and ten teams will participate. It ended on July 12, 2025, with the final game of the playoff finals.

APR were the defending champions, after having won the previous two championships. They successfully defended their title after defeating REG in the playoff finals, thus winning a record-extending 16th championship. As champions of the RBL, APR qualified directly for the 2026 BAL season.

== Team changes ==
Azomco Global Flame was promoted as the champions of the Rwanda Basketball League Division 2. Keplerians were ineligible to promote, as it is a sister club of Kepler BBC, and thus Flame Basketball Club was given the promotion spot.

On January 22, 2025, Flame was disqualified from the RBL season for failing to prove it had the required Rwf 100 million. The season continued with nine teams.

▲ Promoted from RBL Division 2	▼ Relegated from RBL
Azomco Global Flame; Flame (later removed)	Inspired Generations; Kigali Titans

== Regular season ==
The first four teams advanced to the playoffs, while the last placed team was relegated.

Pos	Team	Pld	W	L	PF	PA	PD	Pts	Qualification
1	APR	16	15	1	1386	1073	+313	31	Advance to playoffs
2	REG	16	11	5	1307	1156	+151	27	Advance to playoffs
3	UGB	16	10	6	1254	1228	+26	26	Advance to playoffs
4	Patriots	16	10	6	1269	1148	+121	26	Advance to playoffs
5	Tigers	16	10	6	1349	1317	+32	26	
6	Kepler	16	6	10	1233	1302	−69	22	
7	Orion	16	5	11	1228	1335	−107	21	
8	Azomco BBC	16	3	13	1237	1513	−276	19	
9	Espoir (R)	16	2	14	1211	1402	−191	18	Relegated to Division 2

Source: Afrobasket
(R) Relegated

== Playoffs ==
The playoffs began on 20 June 2025.

Semifinals
2	REG	82	96	89	3
3	UGB	74	84	81	0
1	APR	61	83	59	87	81	3
4	Patriots	78	75	65	63	67	2

Finals
1	APR	91	72	96	81	82	4
2	REG	86	79	59	77	72	1
Third place
3	UGB	96	95	2
4	Patriots	83	75	0

== Awards and statistics ==
=== Individual statistical leaders ===
After the regular season.

Category	Player	Team(s)	Statistic
Points	Mwanawabene Fortunat	Espoir	316
Rebounds	Garba Chingka Kennedy	Orion	260
Assists	Jeffery Stubbs	Orion	96
Steals	Mouhamed Doumbya	UGB	55
Blocks	Fabrice Muhoza	Espoir	44
Efficiency	Garba Chingka Kennedy	Orion	422
Three-pointers made	Elliot Lamar Cole	Patriots	54
Two-points made	Garba Chingka Kennedy	Orion	105
