= Isaiah Miller =

American basketball player (born 1997)

Free agent
- Position: Point guard

Personal information
- Born: November 9, 1997 (age 29) Newark, New Jersey, U.S.
- Listed height: 6 ft 0 in (1.83 m)
- Listed weight: 180 lb (82 kg)

Career information
- High school: Eastside (Covington, Georgia); Newton (Covington, Georgia)
- College: UNC Greensboro (2017–2021)
- NBA draft: 2021: undrafted
- Playing career: 2021–present

Career history
- 2021–2022: Iowa Wolves
- 2022–2024: Salt Lake City Stars
- 2024: APR
- 2024–2025: Austin Spurs

Career highlights
- NBA G League All-Defensive Team (2025); RBL champion (2024); RBL Playoffs MVP (2024); Rwanda Cup winner (2024); 2× SoCon Player of the Year (2020, 2021); 3× SoCon Defensive Player of the Year (2019–2021); 3× First-team All-SoCon (2019–2021); SoCon Tournament MVP (2021)
- Stats at NBA.com
- Stats at Basketball Reference

Isaiah Miller Jr. (born November 9, 1997) is an American professional basketball player who last played for the Austin Spurs of the NBA G League. He played college basketball for the UNC Greensboro Spartans.

== Early life ==
Miller was born in Norfolk, Virginia but grew up in Covington, Georgia. He attended Eastside High School in Covington before transferring to Newton High School before his senior year. As a senior, Miller averaged 20 points, six rebounds and 3.1 steals per game in leading the team to a 28–2 record and Region 8-AAAAAA championship. He was named first team All-Region and All-County and honorable mention All-State. He committed to UNC Greensboro in May 2017.

== College career ==
Miller served as a key reserve at point guard as a true freshman, playing in all 35 of the Spartans' games and was named to the Southern Conference All-Freshman team after averaging 8.3 points and 1.4 steals per game, which was 8th-best in the conference. He became UNC Greensboro's starting point guard during his sophomore year and averaged 15.2 points, 4.5 rebounds, 2.1 assists and conference-best 2.9 steals per game and was named first team All-SoCon. His 104 steals were the second most in school history and in the NCAA Division I for the 2018–19 season. As a junior, Miller was named first team All-SoCon, the conference Defensive Player of the Year and the Southern Conference Player of the Year. He averaged 17.8 points and 2.8 steals per game. Following the season, Miller entered the 2020 NBA draft but did not sign with an agent. On July 22, he announced he was returning for his senior season.

For the 2020–21 season, Miller repeated as the unanimous SoCon Player and Defensive Player of the Year.

== Professional career ==
=== Iowa Wolves (2021–2022) ===
After going undrafted in the 2021 NBA draft, Miller joined the Minnesota Timberwolves for the 2021 NBA Summer League and on September 20, 2021, he signed with the Timberwolves. However, he was waived prior to the start of the season. On October 26, he signed an Exhibit 10 contract with the Iowa Wolves as an affiliate player.

=== Salt Lake City Stars (2022–2024) ===
In May 2022, Miller was invited to participate in a free agent camp by the Utah Jazz. He subsequently made the Jazz Summer League roster.

On August 3, 2022, Miller signed an Exhibit 10 contract with the Portland Trail Blazers, but was waived prior to the start of the season. On October 23, he joined the Salt Lake City Stars.

On October 21, 2023, Miller signed with Utah, but was waived the same day and on October 30, he rejoined the Stars.

=== APR (2024) ===
On July 31, 2024, Miller signed with APR of the Rwanda Basketball League and the Basketball Africa League. In August, APR won the inaugural Rwanda Basketball Cup, behind Miller's 43-point performance in the final against REG.

On September 23, 2024, Miller and APR won the RBL championship after they defeated Patriots in Game 6 of the finals. Miller was named the RBL playoffs MVP.

=== Austin Spurs (2024–present) ===
On October 13, 2024, Miller signed with the San Antonio Spurs, but was waived two days later. On October 29, he joined the Austin Spurs. On February 2, 2025, Miller had suffered a torn right anterior cruciate ligament and would miss the remainder of 2024–25 season.

== Career statistics ==
Legend
| GP | Games played | GS | Games started | MPG | Minutes per game |
| FG% | Field goal percentage | 3P% | 3-point field goal percentage | FT% | Free throw percentage |
| RPG | Rebounds per game | APG | Assists per game | SPG | Steals per game |
| BPG | Blocks per game | PPG | Points per game | **Bold** | Career high |

=== College ===
| Year | Team | GP | GS | MPG | FG% | 3P% | FT% | RPG | APG | SPG | BPG | PPG |
|---|---|---|---|---|---|---|---|---|---|---|---|---|
| 2017–18 | UNC Greensboro | 35 | 0 | 16.3 | **.544** | .111 | .623 | 3.1 | 1.5 | 1.4 | .1 | 8.3 |
| 2018–19 | UNC Greensboro | **36** | 20 | 27.8 | .513 | **.282** | .556 | 4.5 | 2.1 | **2.9** | **.3** | 15.2 |
| 2019–20 | UNC Greensboro | 32 | **32** | 28.4 | .423 | .237 | .537 | 5.0 | 3.1 | 2.8 | .2 | 17.8 |
| 2020–21 | UNC Greensboro | 29 | 28 | **30.8** | .463 | .208 | **.624** | **6.8** | **4.0** | 2.6 | **.3** | **19.2** |
| Career | | 132 | 80 | 25.6 | .474 | .241 | .577 | 4.8 | 2.6 | 2.4 | .2 | 14.9 |
