= 2021–22 RBL season =

2022 RBL season
- Association: FERWABA
- League: Rwanda Basketball League
- Sport: Basketball
- Duration: March 11, 2022 – September 19, 2022
- Number of teams: 13

Regular season
- Top seed: Patriots
- Season MVP: Axel Mpoyo (REG)
- Relegated to Division 2: Rusizi; UR Huye; UR CMHS

Playoffs
- Finals champions: REG (3rd title)
- Runners-up: Patriots

Seasons
- ← 2020–21 2022–23 →

The 2021–22 RBL season is the 1st season of the Rwanda Basketball League under its new name. The season began on March 11, 2022 and ended September 19, 2022.

The defending champions REG repeated and won their third league title, after defeating rivals Patriots in the finals.

== Foreign players ==
The following non-African players played in the RBL in the 2022 season:

Team	Foreign players
APR	(Serbia) Darko Balaban
Tigers BBC	(Germany) Adrian Breitlauch
REG	(United States) Cleveland Thomas

== Regular season ==
The regular season began on March 11 and ended August 14, 2022. The top four teams advanced to the playoffs. The bottom two teams relegate to the Division 2.

Pos	Team	Pld	W	L	GF	GA	GD	Pts	Qualification
1	Patriots	24	22	2	2041	1330	+711	46	Advance to playoffs
2	REG	24	22	2	2191	1402	+789	46	Advance to playoffs
3	APR	24	21	3	2191	1402	+789	45	Advance to playoffs
4	Tigers	24	15	9	1785	1588	+197	39	Advance to playoffs
5	Espoir	24	14	10	1703	1628	+75	38	
6	UGB	24	13	11	1726	1434	+292	37	
7	Shoot for the Stars	24	12	12	1727	1635	+92	36	
8	IPRC-Kigali	23	13	10	1581	1435	+146	36	
9	IPRC-Huye	23	10	13	1673	1440	+233	33	
10	IPRC-Musanze	24	6	18	1368	1835	−467	30	
11	Rusizi (R)	24	5	19	1380	1865	−485	29	Relegated to Division 2
12	UR Huye (R)	24	2	22	1262	2124	−862	26	Relegated to Division 2
13	UR CMHS (R)	24	0	24	1039	2490	−1451	24	Relegated to Division 2

Source: FERWABA
(R) Relegated

== Playoffs ==
=== Bracket ===
Semifinals
1	Patriots	2
4	Tigers	0
2	REG	2
3	APR	1

Finals
1	Patriots	2
2	REG	3
Third place
3	APR	95
4	Tigers	42

=== Semifinals ===
==== (1) Patriots vs. (4) Tigers ====
August 26
20:00

Boxscore

Patriots 91, Tigers 45
Scoring by quarter: 25–9, 24–11, 14–18, 28–7
Pts: Steven Hagumintwari 16; Rebs: Dieudonné Ndizeye 8 Asts: Sedar Sagamba 6	Pts: Adrian Breitlauch 10; Rebs: Adrian Breitlauch 10; Asts: Adrian Breitlauch 3

AIPER Nyandungu, Kigali
Attendance: 312

August 28
2:00 p.m.

Boxscore

Tigers 51, Patriots 73
Scoring by quarter: 14–17, 13–14, 14–21, 10–21
Pts: Adrian Breitlauch 15; Rebs: Adrian Breitlauch 10; Asts: Christian Gakuru 3	Pts: Steven Hagimuntwari 19; Rebs: Bush Wamukota 14; Asts: Chris Crawford 5
Patriots BBC win series 2–0

Kepler Campus, Kigali
Attendance: 250

==== (2) REG vs. (3) APR ====
August 26
20:00

Boxscore

REG 85, APR 47
Scoring by quarter: 16–14, 28–12, 15–6, 25–15
Pts: Engelbert Beleck Bell 19; Rebs: Axel Mpoyo, Elie Kaje 9 each Asts: Adonis Filer 5	Pts: Darko Balaban 14; Rebs: Darko Balaban 16; Asts: Geralde Williams 5

Kepler Campus, Kigali

August 28
6:00 p.m.

Boxscore

APR 68, REG 59
Scoring by quarter: 22–12, 13–17, 14–20, 19–10
Pts: Darko Balaban 22; Rebs: Darko Balaban 13; Asts: Armel Sangwe 8	Pts: Cleveland Thomas 14; Rebs: Wilson Nshobozwa 6 Asts: Wilson Nshobozwa 6

Kepler Campus, Kigali
Attendance: 500

September 2
8:00 p.m.

Boxscore

REG 71, APR 66
Pts: Adonis Filer 22; Rebs: Wilson Nshobozwa 7 Asts: Cleveland Thomas 4	Pts: Armel Sangwe 18; Rebs: Darko Balaban 12; Asts: Steven Pierrere 6
REG win series 2–1

Stecol, Kigali

=== Third place game ===
September 10
4:00 pm

Boxscore

APR	95–42	Tigers
Scoring by quarter: 20–7, 18–16, 36–12, 21–7
Pts: Philippe Kubanatubane 15; Rebs: Arnaud Knusi 10; Asts: Noah Bigirumwami 4		Pts: Christian Nakuru 13; Rebs: Tresor Muteba 11; Asts: Pacifique Mutabazi 2

BK Arena

=== Finals: (1) Patriots vs. (2) REG ===
September 7
8:00 p.m.

Boxscore

Patriots BBC	75–70	REG
Scoring by quarter: 17–23, 17–20, 24–8, 17–9
Pts: Chris Crawford 27; Rebs: Crawford 10; Asts: Gasana, Habimana 3 each		Pts: Adonis Filer 17; Rebs: Filer, Kambuyi Manga 7 each Asts: Filer 5

BK Arena
Attendance: 4,500

September 10
8:00 p.m.

Boxscore

REG	79–70 (OT)	Patriots
Scoring by quarter: 18–25, 17–18, 18–12, 12–10, Overtime: 14–5
Pts: Cleveland Thomas 21; Rebs: Pitchou Kambuy Manga, Axel Mpoyo 14; Asts: Adonis Filer 8		Pts: Kenneth Gasana 16; Rebs: Dieudonné Ndizeye 11; Asts: Dieudonné Ndizeye 6

BK Arena

September 11
8:00 p.m.

Boxscore

Patriots	75–82	REG
Scoring by quarter: 15–22, 18–24, 20–20, 26–9
Pts: Kenneth Gasana 11; Rebs: Bush Wamukota 10; Asts: Ntore Habimana 6		Pts: Adonis Filer 21; Rebs: Pitchou Kambuy Manga 7 Asts: Cleveland Thomas, Adonis Filer 5

Kigali Arena

September 14
8:00 p.m.

Boxscore

REG	65–78	Patriots
Scoring by quarter: 11–14, 10–27, 22–15, 22–22
Pts: Axel Mpoyo 19; Rebs: Axel Mpoyo 10; Asts: Wilson Nshobozwa 4		Pts: Kenneth Gasana 18; Rebs: Ntore Habimana 9 Asts: Kenneth Gasana 10

BK Arena
Attendance: 4,500

September 15
8:00 p.m.

Boxscore

Patriots	74–84	REG
Scoring by quarter: 13–24, 18–18, 18–17, 25–25
Pts: Kendall Gray 18; Rebs: Kendall Gray 15; Asts: Chris Crawford 6		Pts: Adonis Filer 23; Rebs: Adonis Filer 11; Asts: Cleveland Thomas 8
REG wins series 3–2

BK Arena
Attendance: 8,693

== Awards and statistics ==
=== Season awards ===
- Most Valuable Player: Axel Mpoyo (REG)
- Team of the Year:
  - G Adonis Filer (REG)
  - G Kenny Gasana (Patriots)
  - F Steven Hagumintwari (Patriots)
  - F Axel Mpoyo (REG)
  - C Pitchou Kambuy Manga (REG)
  - Coach: Henry Mwinuka (REG)

=== Individual statistical leaders ===
After the regular season.

Category	Player	Team(s)	Statistic
Points	Kamndoh Betoudji Frank	Shoot 4 Stars	455
Rebounds	Kamndoh Betoudji Frank	Shoot 4 Stars	362
Assists	Samuel Niyonshuti	Shoot 4 Stars	163
Steals	Jean de Dieu Umuhoza	UGB	121
Blocks	Kamndoh Betoudji Frank	Shoot 4 Stars	85

== Winning roster ==
REG BBC

- 0 Adonis Filer
- 1 Herve Ikishatse
- 6 Cleveland Thomas
- 7 Pascal Niyonkuru
- 10 Olivier Shyaka
- 11 Parfait Ishimwe
- 13 Elie Kaje
- 14 Axel Mpoyo
- 20 Kami Kabange
- 24 Prince Muhizi
- 35 Pitchou Kambuyi Manga
- 80 Wilson Nshobozwabyosenumukiza
- HC Henry Mwinuka

== All-Star Game ==
The all-star game was played on September 24, 2022, in the BK Arena. Team Mpoyo beat Team Steve 126–116 behind 29 points by top scorer Kendall Gray.

Team Mpoyo
Pos	Player	Team
G	Cleveland Thomas	REG
C	Elie Kaje	REG
C	Kendall Gray	Patriots
G	Adonis Filer	REG
C	Axel Mpoyo	REG
F	Thierry Munyeshuri	Espoir
F	Pascal Niyonk	REG
F	Arnaud Nkusi	APR
G	Wilson Nshobozwabyosenumukiza	REG
G	Armel Sangwe	APR
G	Olivier Shyaka	REG

Team Steve
Pos	Player	Team
G	Steven-Emile Pierrere	APR
C	Frank Betoudji	Shoot 4 Stars
F	Aganze Bazihima	Espoir
C	Tom Wamukota	Patriots
F	Ntore Habimana	Patriots
F	Tresor Muteba	Tigers
F	Steven Hagumintwari	Patriots
F	Kubwimana Kazingufu Ali	APR
C	Justin Uwitonze	IPRC-Kigali
F	Engelbert Beleck Bell	Patriots
F	Dieudonné Ndizeye	Patriots
G	Kenny Gasana	Patriots
