= Kepler BBC =

Kepler Basketball Club
- League: Rwanda Basketball League
- Founded: 2022
- History: Kepler BBC (2022–present)
- Arena: Kepler Sports Court
- Capacity: 500
- Location: Kigali, Rwanda
- Team colors: Green and White
- Main sponsor: Inyange
- CEO: Nathalie Munyampenda
- Head coach: Mandy Juruni
- Ownership: Kepler

Kepler Basketball Club is a Rwandan professional basketball team based in Kigali that is managed by the non-profit educational institution Kepler. Their men's team plays in the Rwanda Basketball League (RBL) since the 2024 season.

== History ==
The over 1,000-student large non-profit education institution Kepler started its basketball program in 2023, mixing the team with both students and professional players. Nathalie Munyampenda was appointed as the club's CEO. In their debut season under Rene Sabahu in the men's Rwanda Basketball League Division 2, they were promoted following a second place finish in the 2023 season.

They acquired all-time legendary player Aristide Mugabe for their inaugural RBL season, and also signed the successful Ugandan coach Mandy Juruni, who came over from BAL club City Oilers. Kepler then went on to sign Guibert Nijimbere, a Burundi national team guard, for the upcoming season as well. Their first league win came on February 18, when they defeated the Kigali Titans at home. Kepler finished the 2024 season in fourth place, and played in the playoffs, in which they lost in the semifinals to Patriots.

== Arena ==
The team plays at an outdoor court at the college but has started building a 1,500-seater indoor hall in 2024.

== Honours ==
- Rwanda Basketball League Division 2
  - Runners-up (1): 2023
- Rwanda Cup
  - Third Place (1): 2025

== Season by season ==
Playoffs berth

Season	Tier	League	Regular season					Postseason	Cup competitions	Head coach
Season	Tier	League	Finish	Played	Wins	Losses	Win %	Postseason	Cup competitions	Head coach
Kepler
2023	2	RBL D2	1st (Group D)	8	8	0	1.000	Lost finals (Inspired Generation)	–	Rene Sabahu
2024	1	RBL	4th	18	10	8	.556	Lost semifinals (Patriots) 0–3	Quarterfinalist (RC)	Mandy Juruni
2025	1	RBL	6th	16	6	10	.375	DNQ		Mandy Juruni
Regular season record				44	24	18	.571	0 regular season champions		
Playoffs record				3	0	3	.000	0 regular season champions		
