= Youssou Ndoye =

Senegalese basketball player

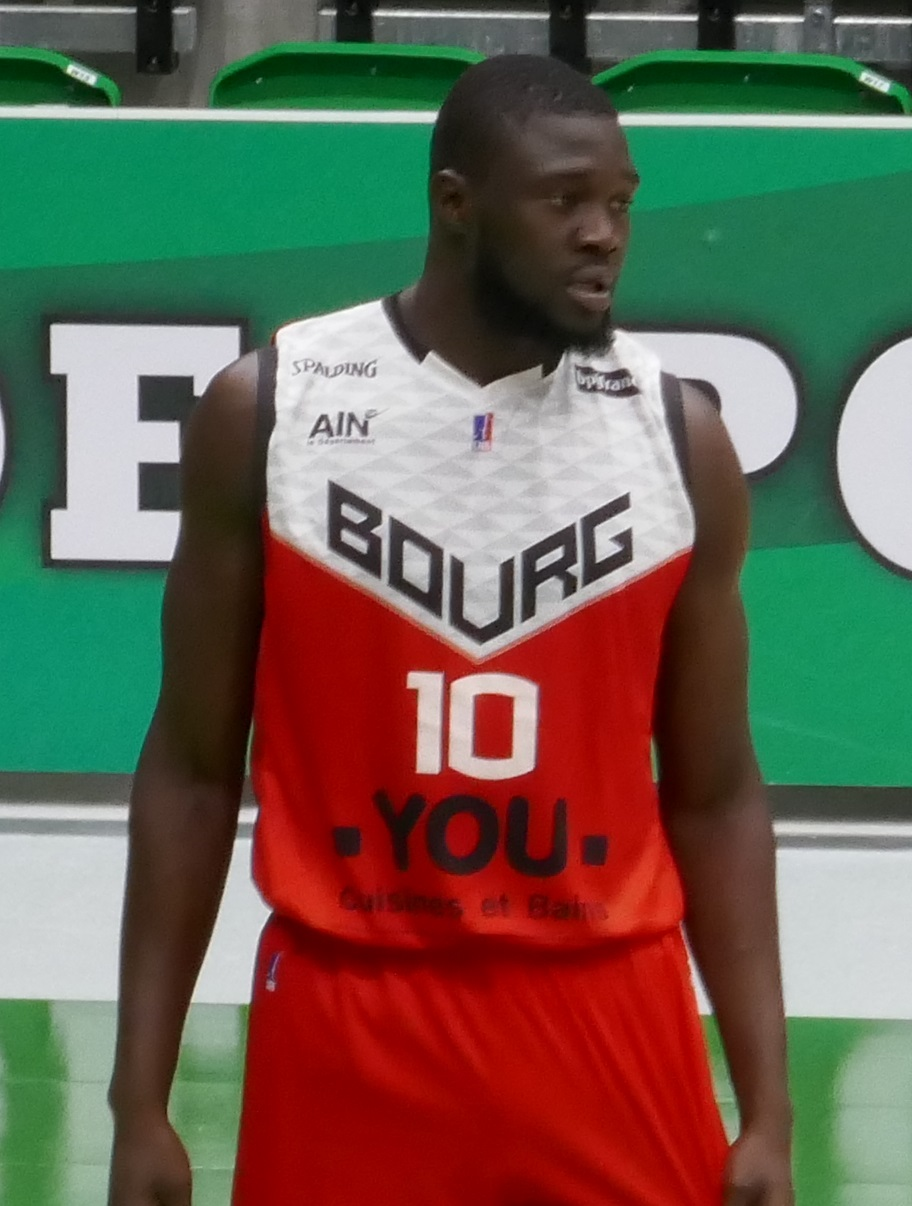
- Nodye with JL Bourg in 2017

Dar City
- Position: Center
- League: Basketball Africa League

Personal information
- Born: 15 July 1991 (age 35) Dakar, Senegal
- Listed height: 213 cm (7 ft 0 in)
- Listed weight: 113 kg (249 lb)

Career information
- High school: Lee Academy (Lee, Maine)
- College: St. Bonaventure (2011–2015)
- NBA draft: 2015: undrafted
- Playing career: 2015–present

Career history
- 2015–2016: Austin Spurs
- 2016–2019: JL Bourg
- 2019–2020: Nanterre 92
- 2020–2021: Real Betis
- 2021–2022: Orléans Loiret Basket
- 2022: Daegu KOGAS Pegasus
- 2023: Covirán Granada
- 2023–2024: Taipei Mars
- 2024: Shijiazhuang Xianglan
- 2024–2025: Daegu KOGAS Pegasus
- 2025: APR
- 2025: Dar City
- 2026: Taipei Taishin Mars
- 2026–present: Dar City

Career highlights
- All-BAL Second Team (2025); All-BAL Defensive Second Team (2025); RBL champion (2025); RBL Playoffs MVP (2025); Pro A rebounding leader (2019); Pro B champion (2017); Third-team All-Atlantic 10 (2015); Atlantic 10 All-Defensive Team (2015)
- Stats at Basketball Reference

Youssou Ndoye (born 15 July 1991) is a Senegalese professional basketball player for the Dar City of the Basketball Africa League (BAL). He played college basketball for the St. Bonaventure Bonnies. He also plays for the Senegal national team and has been the co-captain of the team.

== High school career ==
Ndoye played high school basketball at Lee Academy in Lee, Maine for two years. After averaging seven points, seven rebounds and two blocks per game, he was rated among the top centers of his class heading into college.

== College career ==
As a senior at St. Bonaventure, Ndoye averaged 11.8 points, 10.1 rebounds and 2.6 blocks, earning a mention to the Atlantic 10 All-Defensive Team and a third-team All-Atlantic 10 mention.

== Professional career ==
=== Austin Spurs (2015—2016) ===
After going undrafted in the 2015 NBA draft, Ndoye joined the San Antonio Spurs for the 2015 NBA Summer League where he averaged 3.2 and 1.8 rebounds in six games. On 28 September 2015, Ndoye signed with the Spurs, only to be waived by the team on 21 October after appearing in three preseason games. Nine days later, he was acquired by the Austin Spurs of the NBA Development League as an affiliate player of San Antonio.

=== JL Bourg (2016–2019) ===
After rejoining San Antonio in the 2016 NBA Summer League, Ndoye signed on 5 September 2016, with JL Bourg-en-Bresse of the French LNB Pro B.

=== Nanterre 92 (2019–2020) ===
On 18 August 2019, he has signed with Nanterre 92 of the LNB Pro A.

=== Coosur Real Betis (2020–2021) ===
On 24 June 2020, he has signed with Real Betis of the Liga ACB.

=== Orléans Loiret Basket (2021–2022) ===
On 17 August 2021, he has signed with Orléans Loiret Basket of the LNB Pro A.

=== Daegu KOGAS Pegasus (2022–2023) ===
On 24 July 2022, he signed with Daegu KOGAS Pegasus of the Korean Basketball League.

=== Covirán Granada (2023) ===
On 7 January 2023, he signed with Covirán Granada of the Spanish Liga ACB.

=== Taipei Mars (2023–2024) ===
On 18 October 2023, Ndoye signed with Taipei Mars of the T1 League.

=== Shijiazhuang Xianglan (2024) ===
On 9 June 2024, Ndoye signed with Shijiazhuang Xianglan of the National Basketball League (NBL).

=== Daegu KOGAS Pegasus (2024–2025) ===
In September 2024, Ndoye rejoined the Daegu KOGAS Pegasus of the Korean Basketball League (KBL) to replace Du'Vaughn Maxwell. In April 2025, he was replaced by Mangok Mathiang.

=== APR (2025) ===
On April 23, 2025, Ndoye joined Rwandan team APR of the Basketball Africa League (BAL). Ndoye helped APR finish in the third place in the 2025 season, and was named to the BAL All-Defensive Second Team. He averaged 9 points and 6.8 rebounds in the league. On June 18, Ndoye was also named to the All-BAL Second Team.

On July 12, 2025, Ndoye won the Rwanda Basketball League (RBL) championship with APR, after defeating REG in the finals. He had a game-high 26 points, as well as 7 rebounds and 3 assists in the decisive Game 5, after which they finished the series victorious. Ndoye was named the RBL Playoffs MVP.

=== Taipei Taishin Mars (2026) ===
On March 4, 2026, Ndoye returned to the Taipei Taishin Mars of the Taiwan Professional Basketball League (TPBL).

=== Dar City (2026–present) ===
On October 30, 2026, Ndoye returned to the Dar City of the Basketball Africa League (BAL).

== National team ==
Ndoye plays for the Senegal national team, and has played at the AfroBasket in 2017 and 2021, winning a bronze medal, as well as at the 2019 FIBA Basketball World Cup.

== Personal life ==
Ndoye, the son of Penda and Ibrahima, has an older brother, Mohammed, and two older sisters, Khadija and Maguette. His mother played on the Senegal national basketball team and introduced him to the game. He minored in French history.
