= Kendall Gray =

American basketball player (born 1992)

Kendall Lamar Gray
REG
- Position: Center
- League: Rwanda Basketball League

Personal information
- Born: May 5, 1992 (age 34) Merced, California, U.S.
- Listed height: 6 ft 10 in (2.08 m)
- Listed weight: 240 lb (109 kg)

Career information
- High school: Polytech (Woodside, Delaware)
- College: Delaware State (2011–2015)
- NBA draft: 2015: undrafted
- Playing career: 2015–present

Career history
- 2015–2016: Bayreuth
- 2016–2017: Dąbrowa Górnicza
- 2017–2018: Long Island Nets
- 2018: Soles de Santo Domingo Este
- 2018–2019: Long Island Nets
- 2019–2020: Gießen 46ers
- 2021–2022: JS Kairouan
- 2022: Patriots
- 2022: Bangui Sporting Club
- 2023–present: REG

Career highlights
- RBL All-Star (2022); MEAC Player of the Year (2015); MEAC Defensive Player of the Year (2015); First-team All-MEAC (2015); Second-team All-MEAC (2014)
Medals
Men's basketball
Representing Rwanda
FIBA AfroCan
Bronze medal – third place	Angola 2023

Kendall Lamar Gray (born May 5, 1992) is an American-born Rwandan basketball player who currently plays for REG. He played college basketball for Delaware State University, being named the 2014–15 Mid-Eastern Athletic Conference Player of the Year, becoming the fourth selection in school history to earn the honor.

== Early life ==
Gray was born in Merced, California but grew up in Dover, Delaware. He earned three varsity letters while playing at Polytech High School in Woodside, Delaware. In 2010, he led the team to a Henlopen Conference Southern Division Championship. In Gray's his senior season he averaged 15 points, 12 rebounds, and 11 blocks per game. He then committed to play for the Delaware State Hornets in college.

== College career ==
Although limited to just 17 games his freshman season, Gray still earned two Mid-Eastern Athletic Conference (MEAC) Defensive Player of the Week awards. He was ninth in NCAA Division I in blocks (54) when he went down with an injury. He remained healthy for the final three seasons of his collegiate career and improved statistically in each successive year. As a junior in 2013–14 he averaged 11.5 points, 7.9 rebounds, and 2.7 blocks per game en route to a Second Team All-MEAC selection. In 2014–15, Gray increased those averages to 12.3, 12.4, and 2.8, respectively. On March 5, 2015, Gray recorded a 33-point, 30-rebound game against Coppin State. It was the most rebounds in a single game at the Division I level in 10 years, and he became just the seventh player in the last 40 seasons with at least 30 rebounds in a game. The next day, the Mid-Eastern Athletic Conference named Gray their Player of the Year and Defensive Player of the Year. He joined Kyle O'Quinn as the only two players in conference history to earn both awards in the same season.

== Professional career ==
After going undrafted in the 2015 NBA draft, Gray signed with Medi Bayreuth of the Basketball Bundesliga on July 23, 2015. On January 18, 2016, he parted ways with Medi Bayreuth. On March 31, he was acquired by the Iowa Energy of the NBA Development League but didn't play for them.

On August 23, 2016, Gray signed with MKS Dąbrowa Górnicza of the Polish League.

On June 6, 2018, Gray signed with Soles de Santo Domingo Este of the Dominican League. Gray rejoined the Long Island Nets for the 2018–19 season.

On September 16, 2019, he signed with Gießen 46ers of the Basketball Bundesliga. Gray averaged 3.3 points and 1.9 rebounds per game. On October 11, 2021, he signed with JS Kairouan of the Championnat National A.

In August 2022, Gray joined Patriots BBC on a short-term contract to play in the playoffs of the Rwanda Basketball League (RBL). He was selected to play in the RBL All-Star Game.

In November 2022, Gray played for the Bangui Sporting Club in the Elite 16 of the 2023 Road to BAL games.

In October 2023, Gray joined the Rwandan club REG for the 2023–24 season, to begin his second stint in the Rwanda Basketball League.

== National team career ==
Gray joined the Rwanda national basketball team in 2022. He won a bronze medal at the 2023 FIBA AfroCan in Angola, the country's first podium finish in an international tournament.

== See also ==
- List of NCAA Division I men's basketball players with 30 or more rebounds in a game
