= 2023 RBL season =

2023 season of the Rwanda Basketball League

- Association: FERWABA
- League: Rwanda Basketball League
- Sport: Basketball
- Duration: 12 January – 9 September 2023
- Teams: 12

Regular season
- Top seed: REG
- Season MVP: Olivier Turatsinze (Espoir)
- Top scorer: Olivier Turatsinze (Espoir)
- Relegated to Division 2: RP-IPRC Huye; RP-IPRC Kigali; Shoot For The Stars; RP-IPRC Musanze

Playoffs
- Playoffs MVP: Jean Jacques Nshobozwabyosenumukiza (APR)
- Finals champions: APR (14th title)
- Runners-up: REG

Seasons
- ← 2021–22 2024 →

The 2023 RBL season was the second season of the Rwanda Basketball League under its current name, while the top-level competition has been organised by the FERWABA for a longer time. The season began on 12 January 2023 with the regular season. The playoffs began on 23 August and ended on 9 September 2023.

APR won a record-extending 14th national title, following a clean sweep of defending champions REG in the finals. With their victory, APR ended a 14-year title drought. APR guard Jean Jacques Nshobozwabyosenumukiza was named Playoffs MVP.

As champions, APR qualified directly for the 2024 BAL season.

== Team changes ==
=== Team changes ===
Orion was promoted on 17 July 2022 after reaching the finals of the Rwanda Basketball League Division 2. Kigali Titans were also promoted as the D2 champions.

▲ Promoted from 2021-22 RBL D2	▼ Relegated from 2021-22 RBL
Kigali Titans; Orion	UR Huye; UR CMHS

== Foreign players ==
The following non-African players played in the RBL in the 2023 season:

- Patriots BBC
  - Ater Majok (Lebanon)
  - Michael Dixon (United States)
- Kigali Titans
  - Will Perry (United States)
  - Álvaro Calvo Masa (Spain)
- APR
  - Demarcus Holland (United States)

== Regular season ==
The regular season was decreased from thirteen to twelve teams. This season, four teams are relegated to the Division 2, and the 2024 season will begin with ten teams.

=== Standings ===
Pos	Team	Pld	W	L	GF	GA	GD	Pts	Qualification
1	REG	22	20	2	1980	1358	+622	42	Advance to playoffs
2	Patriots	22	19	3	1868	1286	+582	41	Advance to playoffs
3	APR	22	19	3	2054	1279	+775	41	Advance to playoffs
4	Espoir	22	15	7	1838	1590	+248	37	Advance to playoffs
5	Kigali Titans	22	12	10	1639	1599	+40	34	
6	Orion	22	12	10	1614	1702	−88	34	
7	Tigers	22	11	11	1537	1496	+41	33	
8	UGB	22	10	12	1536	1580	−44	32	
9	RP-IPRC Huye (R)	22	5	17	1424	1777	−353	27	Relegated to Division 2
10	Shoot For The Stars (R)	22	6	16	1325	1700	−375	25 (Note: Shoot For The Stars were given three automatic 20–0 losses, and were given zero points for the games.)	Relegated to Division 2
11	IPRC-Kigali (R)	22	2	20	1381	1913	−532	24	Relegated to Division 2
12	RP-IPRC Musanze (R)	22	1	21	1129	2105	−976	23	Relegated to Division 2

Source: FERWABA
(R) Relegated

=== Results ===
Home \ Away	APR	ESP	IKR	KTT	ORN	PTT	REG	RPH	RPM	SFT	TIG	UGB
APR	—	80–35	106–59	74–58	85–72	74–87	73–63	116–23	106–36	119–42	82–68	97–54
Espoir	76–118	—	90–66	68–63	81–71	71–74	70–76	110–76	114–54	103–78	69–63	73–56
IPRC-Kigali	48–99	67–109	—	57–83	68–97	50–69	68–104	44–56	79–59	68–79	79–90	45–81
Kigali Titans	46–119	74–87	91–87	—	73–55	50–123	65–99	88–70	111–43	80–67	74–82	79–88
Orion	48–121	88–85	92–69	75–73	—	48–79	78–103	79–63	97–41	71–70	75–83	72–67
Patriots	67–60	83–61	98–40	85–98	116–61	—	73–72	75–54	112–37	95–67	77–62	73–64
REG	75–77	82–64	97–53	82–59	103–51	83–69	—	95–67	113–44	101–50	78–61	84–75
RP-IPRC Huye	69–89	84–114	78–51	74–101	75–96	60–93	59–110	—	69–65	20–0	53–78	54–63
RP-IPRC Musanze	43–88	59–126	72–74	41–109	59–79	49–108	39–99	54–85	—	81–78	28–82	53–96
Shoot For The Stars	66–97	69–91	107–84	0–20	60–72	0–20	56–104	79–75	86–57	—	63–76	77–74
Tigers	75–72	48–74	75–53	66–78	62–74	71–113	48–64	70–62	103–52	64–71	—	50–51
UGB	69–102	61–67	81–72	57–66	66–63	53–80	60–92	107–98	91–63	68–60	54–60	—

Source: FERWABA
Legend: Blue = home team win; Red = away team win.

== Playoffs ==
By losing the semi-finals to APR BBC, the Patriots did not reach the finals for the first time in 9 years. APR won finals in a clean sweep, defeating the defending champions REG BBC in four games. This was the league’s first-ever sweep since introducing the best-of-seven format.

In the third place series, the Patriots forfeited Game 1 after not showing up, which resulted in a victory for Espoir BBC.

Semifinals
1	REG	3
4	Espoir	0
2	Patriots	0
3	APR	3

Finals
1	REG	0
3	APR	4
Third place
2	Patriots	0
4	Espoir	1

=== Semifinals ===
==== (1) REG vs. (4) Espoir ====
August 23, 2023
7:00 PM

Report

REG	85–79	Espoir

BK Arena

August 25, 2023
9:00 PM

Report

Espoir	53–93	REG

Lycée de Kigali

August 27, 2023
5:00 PM

Report

REG	96–60	Espoir

BK Arena

==== (2) Patriots vs. (3) APR ====
August 23, 2023
9:00 PM

Report

Patriots	59–69	APR

BK Arena

August 25, 2023
9:00 PM

Report

APR	70–63	Patriots

BK Arena

August 27, 2023
7:30 PM

Report

Patriots	52–62	APR

BK Arena

=== Third place game ===
September 3, 2023
2:30 PM

Report

Patriots	0–20	Espoir

BK Arena

=== Finals ===
September 1, 2023
9:00 PM

Report

REG	62–68	APR

BK Arena

September 3, 2023
7:30 PM

Report

APR	74–62	REG

BK Arena

September 6, 2023
9:00 PM

Report

REG	75–80	APR

BK Arena

September 8, 2023
9:30 PM

Report

APR	80–68	REG

Petit Stade Remera

== Awards and statistics ==
=== Season awards ===
The winners of the annual awards were announced after the last game of the finals, on 9 September.

- Season MVP: Olivier Turatsinze, Espoir
- Top Scorer: Olivier Turatsinze, Espoir
- Playoffs Most Valuable Player: Jean Jacques Nshobozwabyosenumukiza, APR
- Coach of the Year: Maz Trakh, APR
- Top Scorer: Olivier Turatsinze, Espoir
- Best 3pt Shooter: Nshimiyimana Yoronimu, IPRC Kigali
- Best Defender: Frank Kamndoh, United Generations Basketball

=== Individual statistical leaders ===
After the regular season.

Category	Player	Team(s)	Statistic
Points	Olivier Turatzinse	Espoir	471
Rebounds	Kamndoh Betoudji Frank	United Generations for Basketball	269
AssiSFT	Jean de Dieu Niyungeho	Espoir	125
Steals	Olivier Turatzinse	Espoir	69
Blocks	Kamndoh Betoudji Frank	United Generations for Basketball	59
