= Rwanda Basketball Cup =

- Organising body: FERWABA
- Founded: 2024
- First season: 2024
- Country: Rwanda
- Number of teams: 21
- Related competitions: Rwanda Basketball League; Rwanda Basketball League Division 2
- Current champions: Tigers (2nd title) (2026)
- Most championships: Tigers (2 titles)

The Rwanda Basketball Cup is a basketball cup competition for men's teams in Rwanda. The competition is made up of teams from the Rwanda Basketball League as well as the Rwanda Basketball League Division 2. The tournament was introduced in 2024 by the FERWABA, and APR was the inaugural winner.

The winners of the competition qualify for the East Africa Cup, a future FIBA-organised tournament.

== Format ==
The cup competition begins with a group stage with the lowest ranked teams from the Rwanda Basketball League and the Rwanda Basketball League Division 2. The winner of each group advances to the playoffs, which is played in single-elimination format. The semifinals and finals are held over one weekend, and a third place game is played as well.

== Finals ==
List of Rwanda Basketball Cup seasons
Season	Winners	Runners-up	Finals score	Third place	Fourth place
2024	APR	REG	110–93	Patriots	Espoir
2025	Tigers	REG	83–77	Kepler	APR
2026	RSSB Tigers	REG	72–68		

== See also ==
- Rwanda Basketball League
- Rwanda Basketball League Division 2
