= Cleveland Thomas =

American basketball player (born 1993)

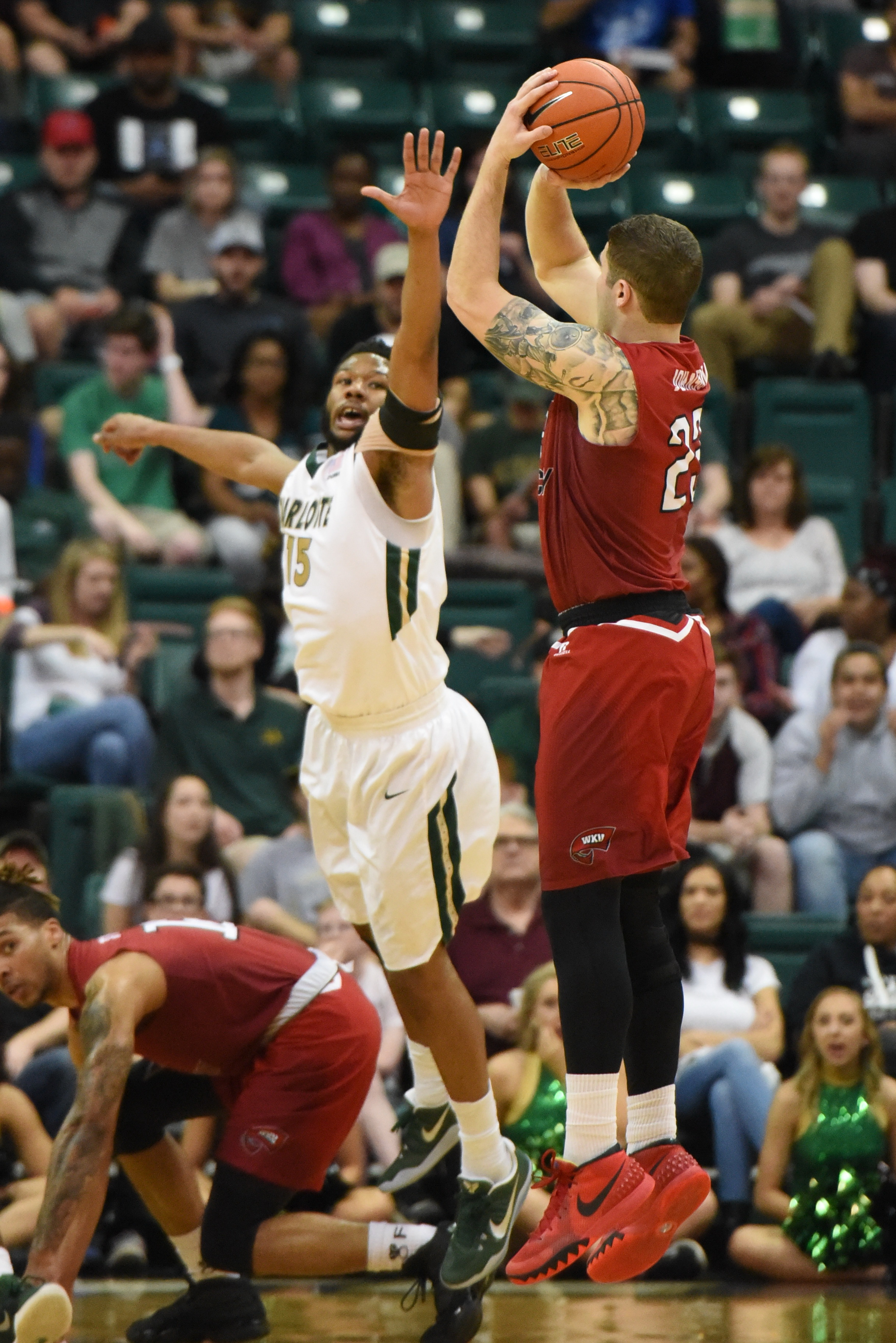
- Thomas in the bottom with Western Kentucky.

No. 77 – Halcones de Ciudad Obregón
- Position: Shooting guard
- League: CIBACOPA

Personal information
- Born: December 2, 1993 (age 32) Baton Rouge, Louisiana, U.S.
- Listed height: 6 ft 4 in (1.93 m)
- Listed weight: 195 lb (88 kg)

Career information
- High school: Scotlandville Magnet (Baton Rouge, Louisiana)
- College: New Mexico (2012–2014); Hartford (2015–2016); Western Kentucky (2016–2017)
- NBA draft: 2017: undrafted
- Playing career: 2017–present

Career history
- 2017–2019: Zlatorog Laško
- 2019–2021: KTE-Duna Aszfalt
- 2021–2022: Apollon Patras
- 2022: REG
- 2022: Al-Ahli Benghazi
- 2022–2023: Beirut Club
- 2023: REG
- 2023: Dorados de Chihuahua
- 2023: Pazi
- 2024: Al-Naft
- 2024: Al Wahda
- 2024: Halcones de Ciudad Obregón
- 2024–2025: REG
- 2026–present: Halcones de Ciudad Obregón

Career highlights
- BAL assists leader (2023); RBL champion (2022); RBL All-Star (2022); Alpe Adria Cup winner (2018); Second-team All-America East (2016)

Cleveland Joseph "Pancake" Thomas Jr. (born December 2, 1993) is an American professional basketball player for the REG of the Rwanda Basketball League.

== High school career ==
Thomas attended Scotlandville Magnet High School. As a senior, he averaged 18 points, eight rebounds, three steals and two assists per game, earning Class 5A All-State honors. Thomas posted 21 points and 11 rebounds in an 82–48 victory over McKinley High School in the state title game.

== College career ==
Thomas began his college basketball career with New Mexico, helping the Lobos reach the NCAA Tournament as a freshman. He averaged 3.9 points per game as a sophomore and saw his minutes dwindle as the season progressed. Thomas opted to transfer following the season, but tore his ACL three days later. He opted to come to Hartford, one of the few schools to show interest despite the injury. As a junior, he averaged 19 points and 6.4 rebounds per game and had four 30-point performances. Thomas transferred to Western Kentucky for his redshirt senior season.

== Professional career ==
Thomas played for KTE-Duna Aszfalt during the 2020–21 season and averaged 14.8 points, 5.8 rebounds, 3.1 assists, and 1.3 steals per game. On September 6, 2021, Thomas signed with Apollon Patras of the Greek Basket League. He averaged 8.8 points, 3.6 rebounds, and 2.0 assists per game. On February 4, 2022, Thomas parted ways with the team.

In March 2022, Thomas was added to the roster of Rwandan club REG for the 2022 BAL season, the second season of the Basketball Africa League. On March 6, he scored a game-high 26 points in his league debut to help REG win the first game over AS Salé. He also went on to win the Rwanda Basketball League championship in 2022.

In October 2022, Thomas played for Al-Ahli Benghazi in the 2022 Arab Club Basketball Championship. He later joined Beirut Club of the Lebanese Basketball League (LBL) and West Asia Super League (WASL).

On February 15, 2023, Thomas re-joined REG. He played in the 2023 BAL season with REG.

In July 2023, he joined Mexican side Dorados de Chihuahua.

In November 2023, Thomas joined Pazi BBC in Tanzania.

== Personal life ==
Thomas gained the nickname "Pancake" from his grandmother, who remarked that his mother's stomach was flat as a pancake during her pregnancy with him. He is a pescatarian and is an advocate for depression awareness

== BAL career statistics ==
Legend
GP	Games played	GS	Games started	MPG	Minutes per game
FG%	Field goal percentage	3P%	3-point field goal percentage	FT%	Free throw percentage
RPG	Rebounds per game	APG	Assists per game	SPG	Steals per game
BPG	Blocks per game	PPG	Points per game	**Bold**	Career high

Year	Team	GP	GS	MPG	FG%	3P%	FT%	RPG	APG	SPG	BPG	PPG
2022	REG	6	6	35.2	.419	.375	.813	5.3	4.8	1.5	0.3	20.3

== Awards and accomplishments ==
=== Club ===
REG

- Rwanda Basketball League: (2022)

Zlatorog Laško

- Alpe Adria Cup: (2018)

=== Individual ===
- RBL All-Star: (2022)
- Second-team All-America East: (2016)
