= IPRC-Kigali =

- League: Rwanda Basketball League Division 2
- Location: Kigali, Rwanda
- Head coach: Jean Bahufite
- Championships: 1 Rwandan Heroes Cup (2017)

IPRC-Kigali BBC is a Rwandan basketball club based in the Kicukiro district of Kigali. It is the basketball team of the IPRC Kigali Polytechnic University. Several Rwandan national team players, such as Dieudonné Ndizeye, have played for the team. IPRC-Kigali were relegated from the Rwanda Basketball League in the 2023 season, and currently play in Division 2.

== Honours ==
Rwandan Heroes Cup

- Winner (1): 2017

== Notable players ==
- (Rwanda) Dieudonné Ndizeye (2 seasons: 2015–17)
- (Burundi) Guibert Nijimbere (2 seasons: 2017–19)
- (Rwanda) NSHIMIYIMANA YORONIMU (2 seasons: 2023–24)

== Season by season ==
Season	Tier	League	Position	W	L	Heroes Cup
2016–17	1	NBL Rwanda	4th			Winner
2017–18	1	NBL Rwanda	4th			
2018–19	1	NBL Rwanda	5th			
2019–20	1	NBL Rwanda	3rd			Runner-up
2020–21	1	NBL Rwanda	4th			Cancelled
2021–22	1	RBL	8th	13	10	Cancelled
2023	1	RBL	11th ▼	2	20	
