= United Generations Basketball =

UGB
- League: Rwanda Basketball League
- Established: 1998
- History: United Generations Basketball (1998–present)
- Location: Kigali, Rwanda
- President: Kenny Mugarura
- Head coach: Olivier Ndayiragije
- Ownership: Bruce Melodie

United Generations Basketball, also known as UGB, is a Rwandan semi-professional basketball team based in Kigali. The team plays in the Rwanda Basketball League (RBL), the top division in the country since 1998.

The team is co-owned by singer Bruce Melodie, who became a minority shareholder in 2024. Every year, UGB hosts an exhibition tournament named the Legacy Tournament in honour of club founders Championat Aimable and Jean De Dieu Nizeyimana. Among the team's most famous players are Jean Jacques Boissy and Guibert Nijimbere.

During the 2025 season, coach Yves Murenzi was released from the head coaching job mid-season and replaced by Burundian coach Olivier Ndayiragije.

== Honours ==
Rwanda Basketball League

- Third Place (1): 2025

== Season by season ==
Playoffs berth

| Season | Tier | League | Regular season | | | | | Postseason | Cup competitions | Head coach |
| Season | Tier | League | Finish | Played | Wins | Losses | Win % | Postseason | Cup competitions | Head coach |
|---|---|---|---|---|---|---|---|---|---|---|
United Generations Basketball
| 2018–19 | 1 | NBL | 7th | 15 | 5 | 10 | .333 | Did not qualify | | |
| 2019–20 | 1 | NBL | 3rd | 3 | 1 | 2 | .333 | Did not qualify | | |
| 2020–21 | 1 | NBL | 4th | 13 | 7 | 6 | .538 | Lost in group stage 1–2 | | |
| 2022 | 1 | RBL | 7th | 24 | 14 | 10 | .583 | Did not qualify | | Yves Murenzi |
| 2023 | 1 | RBL | 8th | 22 | 10 | 12 | .455 | Did not qualify | | Yves Murenzi |
| 2024 | 1 | RBL | 6th | 18 | 8 | 10 | .444 | Did not qualify | Quarterfinalist (RC) | Yves Murenzi |
| 2025 | 1 | RBL | 3rd | 16 | 10 | 6 | .625 | Lost semifinals (REG) 0–3 Won third place game (Patriots) | TBD | Olivier Ndayiragije |
| Regular season record | | | | 111 | 55 | 56 | .495 | 0 regular season champions | | |
| Playoffs record | | | | 7 | 2 | 5 | .286 | 0 championships | | |

== Notable players ==
Note: Flags indicate national team eligibility at FIBA-sanctioned events. Players may hold other non-FIBA nationalities not displayed.

Criteria

To appear in this section a player must have either:

- Set a club record or won an individual award while at the club
- Played at least one official international match for their national team at any time
- Played at least one official NBA match at any time.

- Patrick Rembert
- Jean Jacques Boissy
- Guibert Nijimbere
- Nemanja Milošević
