= Pitchou Kambuy Manga =

Congolese basketball player (born 1988)

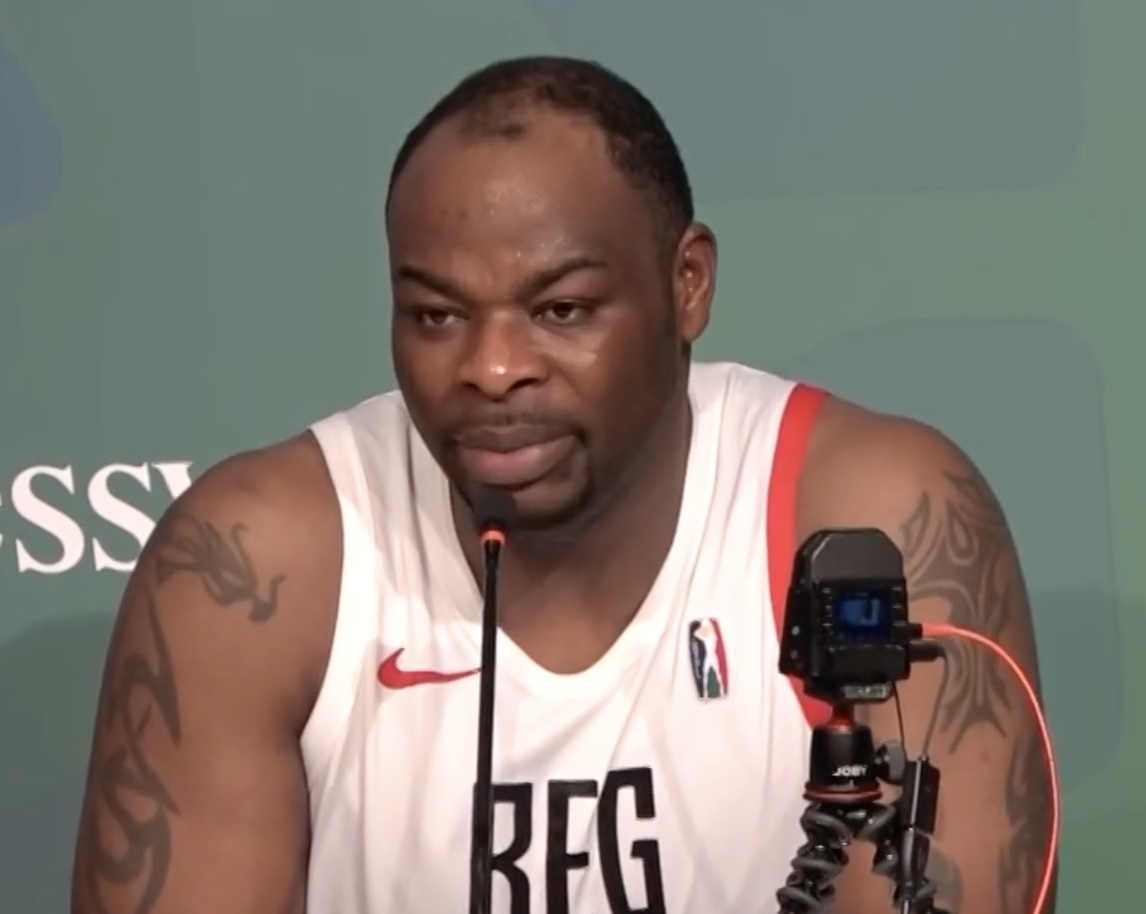
- Kambuy Manga in 2023

No. 34 – Tigers
- Position: Center
- League: RBL; BAL

Personal information
- Born: 12 December 1988 (age 37) Lubumbashi, DR Congo
- Listed height: 2.08 m (6 ft 10 in)
- Listed weight: 115 kg (254 lb)

Career information
- NBA draft: 2010: undrafted

Career history
- 2011–2022: Mazembe
- 2022–2025: REG
- 2024: Chaux Sport
- 2025–present: Tigers

Career highlights
- RBL champion (2022); RBL Defensive Player of the Year (2024); First-team All-RBL (2022)
Medals
Men's basketball
Representing the Democratic Republic of the Congo
FIBA AfroCan
Gold medal – first place	Mali 2019

Pitchou Kambuy Manga (born 12 December 1988) is a Congolese basketball player who plays for Tigers of the Rwanda Basketball League (RBL). He also plays for the DR Congo men's national basketball team.

== Professional career ==
From 2011, Kambuy Manga played for Mazembe and has several appearances in the FIBA Africa Club Champions Cup with the team.

In April, Kambuy Manga signed in Spain with CB Prat, Club Joventut Badalona's farm team, but the deal did not manifest as Mazembe asked for a transfer sum.

In February 2022, he joined REG of the Rwanda Basketball League (RBL). He was named to the All-RBL First Team for the 2021–22 season. With REG, Kambuy Manga made his debut in the Basketball Africa League (BAL). On 14 March 2022, he had a double-double of 16 points and 10 rebounds in a win over US Monastir.

Kambuy Manga was named the RBL's Defensive Player of the Year in the 2024 season.

In October 2024, he joined Congolese champions Chaux Sport for the Road to BAL 2025.

== National team career ==
Kambuy Manga represented DR Congo at AfroBasket tournaments in 2017 and 2021. He was the captain of his country at AfroCan 2019, where the Congo won a gold medal. He averaged 8 points and 4.8 rebounds for his country in the tournament.
