= Aristide Mugabe =

Rwandan basketball player (born 1988)

Kepler
- Title: Assistant coach
- League: Rwanda Basketball League

Personal information
- Born: 11 February 1988 (age 38) Maraba, Rwanda
- Listed height: 6 ft 0 in (1.83 m)

Career information
- NBA draft: 2011: undrafted
- Playing career: 2007–2026
- Position: Point guard
- Coaching career: 2024–present

Career history

Playing
- 2007–2009: Rusizi
- 2009–2015: Espoir
- 2015–2023: Patriots
- 2024–2026: Kepler

Coaching
- 2024–present: Kepler (assistant)

Career highlights
- As player: 8× RBL champion (2012–2015, 2016, 2018–2020); 2× RBL Most Valuable Player (2012, 2013); 4× All-RBL First-team (2012, 2013, 2015, 2017); FIBA Africa Zone 5 Club Championship MVP (2012); 2× Rwandan Heroes Cup winner (2015, 2016); 2× Rwandan Heroes Cup MVP (2015, 2016); No. 88 retired by Patriots BBC

Aristide Mugabe (born 11 February 1988) is a Rwandan former basketball player and current coach for Kepler of the Rwanda Basketball League (RBL). He played 11 years for the Rwanda national team during his career. He is widely regarded as one of the best players in Rwandan basketball history.

Starting his career with Rusizi, Mugabe signed with Espoir in 2009 and helped the team win four RBL championships while winning two MVP awards. In 2015, he transferred to Patriots where he won four more championships. Mugabe is one of the most decorated players in Rwandan basketball history.

For Rwanda, Mugabe played in three AfroBasket tournaments.

== Early life ==
Mugabe was born to Theotime Habiryayo and Veneranda Mukamurehe in Maraba, a sector in the Huye District of Rwanda, and was the second born in a family of three boys. He grew up playing football with other children in his neighborhood.

In 1994, when Mugabe was six years old, his father, older and younger brothers, and other relatives were killed by the Interahamwe militia in the Rwandan genocide. After their deaths, he frequently moved around to escape the Interahamwe. Eventually, he and his mother were evacuated to Burundi by the humanitarian organization Terre des hommes.

The trauma of losing his family members in the genocide caused him to give up sports for the next six years. In 2001, Mugabe started playing basketball after being encouraged by his secondary school, E.A.V. Ntendezi, in the Nyamasheke District. He credits basketball with helping him recover from the genocide. He attended St. Joseph Kabgayi, where he won a high school title and finished third place at the East African secondary school games, before moving to Laiser Hill Academy in Nairobi, Kenya for one year, winning an East Africa secondary school title as its most valuable player (MVP).

== Professional career ==
In 2007, Mugabe made his debut in the National Basketball League (NBL), the top-flight league in Rwanda, with Rusizi BBC. Two years later, he joined Rwandan team Espoir BBC. Mugabe also played in the Zone VI Championships qualifiers of the FIBA Africa Clubs Championship with Marine BBC in 2009 and with Cercle Sportif de Kigali (CSK) in 2010. In 2012, Mugabe led Espoir to its first Zone V championship, a qualifier for the 2012 FIBA Africa Clubs Champions Cup, and was named MVP of the National Basketball League after winning the regular season title and playoffs trophy. In 2013, he repeated as MVP after helping Espoir win the regular season title and playoffs trophy.

In 2015, Mugabe signed with fellow Kigali-based club Patriots. With the Patriots, he won a title in 2016 and three consecutive NBL titles in 2018, 2019 and 2020. He also played in the 2021 BAL season, the inaugural season of the Basketball Africa League (BAL), where he captained the Patriots team to the fourth place. On 2 March 2024, the Patriots retired Mugabe's jersey number 88.

On 1 February 2024, Mugabe ended his 7-season tenure with the Patriots and signed with newly promoted team Kepler. He announced his retirement on 10 February 2026, thereby ending his 18-year career.

== National team career ==
Mugabe played for the Rwanda national basketball team for 11 years, serving as captain in most of them. He played in AfroBasket in 2011, 2013, and 2017. Mugabe announced his retirement in 2021.

== Personal life ==
In early 2014, Mugabe graduated from University of Lay Adventists of Kigali (UNILAK) in Kigali with a bachelor's degree in finance. He worked at the Bank of Kigali, and later as an accountant for Rwandan security company ISCO.

== BAL career statistics ==
Legend
GP	Games played	GS	Games started	MPG	Minutes per game
FG%	Field goal percentage	3P%	3-point field goal percentage	FT%	Free throw percentage
RPG	Rebounds per game	APG	Assists per game	SPG	Steals per game
BPG	Blocks per game	PPG	Points per game	**Bold**	Career high

Year	Team	GP	GS	MPG	FG%	3P%	FT%	RPG	APG	SPG	BPG	PPG
2021	Patriots	6	0	11.5	.542	.550	.818	1.2	1.0	.5	.0	7.7
Career		6	0	11.5	.542	.550	.818	1.2	1.0	.5	.0	7.7
