= Adonis Filer =

American-Rwandan basketball player (born 1993)

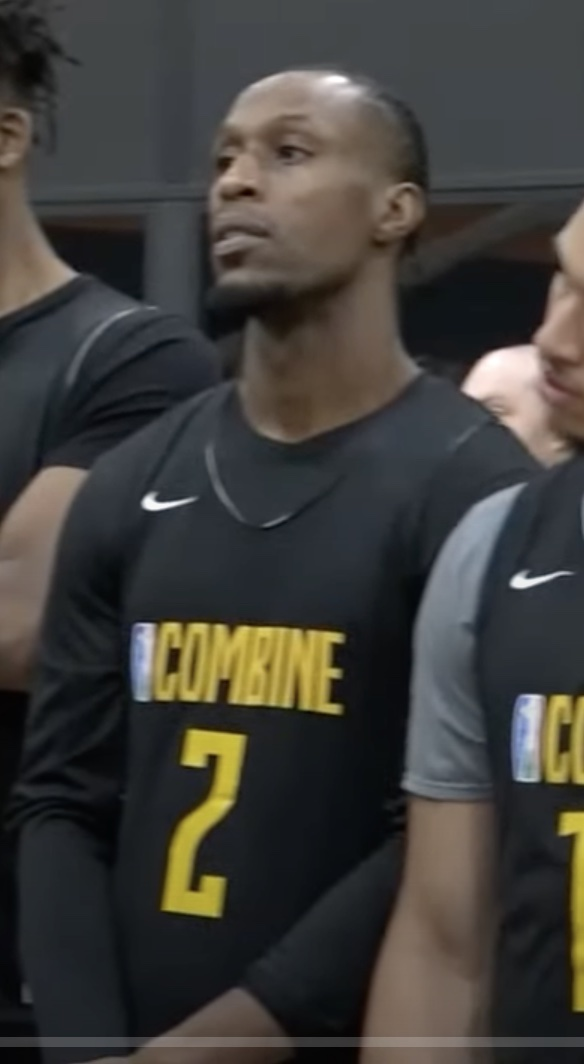
- Filer at the 2023 BAL Combine

No. 00 – APR
- Position: Point guard / shooting guard
- League: RBL; BAL

Personal information
- Born: July 11, 1993 (age 33) Chicago, Illinois
- Listed height: 1.83 m (6 ft 0 in)
- Listed weight: 88 kg (194 lb)

Career information
- High school: Mount Carmel High School (Chicago, Illinois); Bishop Noll Institute (Hammond, Indiana); Notre Dame Preparatory School (Fitchburg, Massachusetts)
- College: Clemson (2012–2014); Florida Atlantic (2015–2017)
- NBA draft: 2017: undrafted
- Playing career: 2018–present

Career history
- 2018–2019: Beroe
- 2020–2021: Patriots
- 2021–2023: REG
- 2022: →Urunani
- 2023–present: APR

Career highlights
- 2× RBL champion (2021, 2022); 2× First-team All-RBL (2021, 2022); 2× RBL All-Star (2021, 2022)

Adonis Jovon Filer (born July 11, 1993) is a Rwandan-American basketball player who currently plays for APR. He also plays for the Rwanda national basketball team in International competitions.

== Early life ==
Born and raised in Chicago, Filer attended Mount Carmel High School before transferring to the Bishop Noll Institute in Hammond, Indiana. He later also attended Notre Dame Preparatory School in Fitchburg, Massachusetts.

== College career ==
Filer committed to the Clemson Tigers. In his rookie season, he averaged 10.0 points and 4.0 rebounds. After two years, he transferred from Clemson to Florida Atlantic.

== Professional career ==
On September 14, 2017, Filer signed his first professional contract with Cypriot club Apollon Limassol. He was released before playing any official game with the team.

Filer then signed a contract for the 2018–19 season, with Beroe of the Bulgarian National Basketball League (NBL).

During the 2020–21 season, Filer played with the Patriots of the RNBL. After the season, his contract expired. On June 8, 2021, Filer signed with REG. On March 8, 2022, he set a new BAL record for most assists in a game after racking up 14 assists in a win over AS Salé. The same season, he went on to win his second RBL title and was named to the All-RBL First Team a second year in a row.

In November 2022, Filer played with Urunani BBC in the Elite 16 of the 2023 BAL qualification. He returned to REG for the 2023 main season.

In October 2023, Filer joined APR, his third Rwandan club. Filer played in the 2024 BAL season with APR. On May 11, 2024, he tore his achilles tendon which would keep him out for at least eight months. Without Filer, APR went on to lose their final game and subsequently failed to qualify for the playoffs.

== National team career ==
Filer was selected for the Rwanda national basketball team in 2020 and made his debut during the AfroBasket 2021 qualification.

== Career statistics ==
Legend
GP	Games played	GS	Games started	MPG	Minutes per game
FG%	Field goal percentage	3P%	3-point field goal percentage	FT%	Free throw percentage
RPG	Rebounds per game	APG	Assists per game	SPG	Steals per game
BPG	Blocks per game	PPG	Points per game	**Bold**	Career high

=== College ===
Year	Team	GP	GS	MPG	FG%	3P%	FT%	RPG	APG	SPG	BPG	PPG
2012–13	Clemson	31	4	19.9	0.37	0.313	0.675	2.3	1.5	0.7	0	6.3
2013–14	Clemson	35	4	14.7	0.333	0.297	0.794	1.3	1.2	0.7	0	3.9
2014–15	Transfer											
2015–16	Florida Atlantic	32	32	28.2	0.398	0.289	0.758	4.8	2.1	1	0.1	10.3
2016–17	Florida Atlantic	30	6	22.6	0.381	0.3	0.807	2.9	2.1	1	0	10.9
Career		128	46	21.2	0.369	0.30	0.759	2.8	1.7	0.8	0.0	7.7

=== BAL ===
Year	Team	GP	GS	MPG	FG%	3P%	FT%	RPG	APG	SPG	BPG	PPG
2022	REG	6	6	27.8	.400	.350	.682	1.7	**7.2**	**1.3**	.0	10.3
2023	REG	6	6	**35.1**	**.443**	**.361**	**.793**	2.8	4.3	.8	.0	**17.7**
2024	APR	5	5	31.1	.294	.192	.750	**5.4**	3.8	1.2	**.6**	10.8

== Awards and accomplishments ==
=== Club ===
REG

- 2× Rwanda Basketball League: (2021, 2022)
