= Kigali Titans =

- League: RBL D2
- Founded: 2021
- History: Kigali Titans; 2021–present
- Location: Kigali, Rwanda
- President: Eugene Rubonera Junior
- Head coach: Cyril Kalima
- Championships: 1 RBL Division 2

The Kigali Titans are a Rwandan professional basketball team based in Kigali. The team plays in the Rwanda Basketball League Division 2 (RBL D2), the second-highest national level.

== History ==
The organisation was founded in 2021 by pharmaceutical businessman Eugene Rubonera Junior after the FERWABA announced to create a national second division for men's teams. Cyril Kalima assumed the function of head coach.

The Titans entered the RBL Division 2 in their debut season, and immediately won the 2021–22 championship that earned the promotion to the top-flight league. The finals of the Division 2 were won 2–0 over Orion BBC. In their second season, the Titans signed international players Will Perry, Francis Azolibe and Álvaro Calvo Masa.

In the 2024 season, the Titans finished in the 10th and last place, and as such they were relegated back to the Division 2.

== Honours ==
Rwanda Basketball League Division 2

- Champions (1): 2021–22

== Season by season ==
Relegated

| Season | Tier | League | Regular season | | | | | Postseason | Cup competitions | Head coach |
| Season | Tier | League | Finish | Played | Wins | Losses | Win % | Postseason | Cup competitions | Head coach |
|---|---|---|---|---|---|---|---|---|---|---|
Kigali Titans
| 2023 | 1 | RBL | 5th | 22 | 12 | 10 | .545 | Did not qualify | | Cyril Kalima |
| 2024 | 1 | RBL | 10th | 18 | 2 | 16 | .111 | Did not qualify | Group Stage (RC) | Cyril Kalima |
| Regular season record | | | | 40 | 14 | 26 | .350 | | | |
