= Rwanda Basketball League =

Top professional basketball league in Rwanda

- Organising body: FERWABA
- Founded: 1977
- First season: 1977
- Country: Rwanda
- Number of teams: 10
- Level on pyramid: 1
- Relegation to: Rwanda Basketball League Division 2
- Domestic cup: Rwanda Cup
- Supercup: Rwanda Super Cup
- International cup: Basketball Africa League (BAL)
- Current champions: APR (17th title) (2026)
- Most championships: APR (17 titles)
- 2026 RBL season

The Rwanda Basketball League (RBL) (formerly the National Basketball League Rwanda) is the top professional basketball league in Rwanda. Its season usually runs from November to September. The winners of the NBL season qualify for the qualifiers for the Basketball Africa League (BAL).

The league currently consists of 10 teams, most of them being from the country's capital Kigali. The current champion of the RBL are APR, who are the league’s most decorated team with a record 16 championships. Other notable teams are REG and their rivals Patriots, who have been powerhouses in recent years.

Since the 2021–22 season, the FERWABA also organises the RBL Division 2 to which the bottom two teams of the RBL relegate.

== History ==
Basketball was introduced in Rwanda in 1930 by Catholic priests, who first taught the sport at high schools in the Southern Province. The following decades, the presence of the sport increased as the military and some public institutions created basketball teams. In 1974, the national basketball federation FERWABA was established. Three years later, in 1977, the first national league was created.

The 1994 Rwandan genocide threw the sport back, because Tutsi players, spectators and administrators died and crucial infrastructure was destroyed.

In the 2000s, APR was the dominant team in Rwanda and it participated in the FIBA Africa Clubs Champions Cup thrice. Its best result was a bronze medal in 2009.

From 2011 to 2015, Espoir BBC won four straight national titles. From then, two newly established teams REG (owned by the Rwanda Energy Group) and Patriots entered the league. The two teams became rivals and played each other in the finals for several years.

In the 2020s, the Basketball Africa League (BAL) was introduced – the first editions were hosted by the BK Arena in Kigali. Patriots finished in fourth place in the inaugural 2021 season. The league changed its name to the Rwanda Basketball League (RBL) in 2023. FERWABA introduced two new competitions, the Rwanda Cup and the Rwanda Super Cup, for the 2024 season.

== Venues ==
The league games in the regular season are usually stated in the Lycée de Kigali's indoor hall, which can seat 1,500 spectators, after it was revamped by FERWABA and NBA Africa in 2023. Other games are played at Kepler University's indoor hall. Playoffs games are usually held at the 10,000-seater BK Arena (formerly the Kigali Arena), which was opened in 2019. Another hall that is used is the Petit Arena, which was recently renovated to hold 1,500 people.

== Current teams ==
=== 2025 teams ===
The following teams will play in the 2025 BAL season:

Team	City	Founded	Joined
APR	Kigali	1993	
Azomco Global Flame	Bugesera	2022	2025
Espoir	Kigali	2003	
Flame	Kigali		
Patriots	Kigali	2014	
Kepler	Kigali	2022	2024
REG	Kigali	2016	
Orion BBC	Kigali	2022	2023
Tigers	Kigali	2019	
UGB	Kigali	1998	

=== Former teams ===
Team	City	Founded	Last season
30 Plus	Kigali (Kimisagara)	2006	2021
Inspired Generation	Kigali	2022	2024
IPRC-Huye	Huye		
IPRC-Kigali	Kigali		
IPRC-Musanze	Ruhengeri, Musanze		
Kigali Titans	Kigali	2021	2024
Rusizi	Rusizi		
Shoot for the Stars	Kigali		
University of Rwanda	Huye		
University of Rwanda – CHMS	Kigali		

(Note: From. Four teams play home games outside Kigali – RP-IPRC Huye BBC and UR BBC-MEN (Butare), RP IPRC MUSANZE (Ruhengeri), and RUSIZI Basketball Club (Cyangugu). The remaining ten teams all play games at Kigali venues Club Rafiki, Kigali Arena, NPC, Petit stade Remera, and RP-IPRC Kigali.)

== Champions ==
The following is a list of all documented Rwandan top-flight league champions:

- 1995: APR
- 1996: APR
- 1997: APR
- 1998: APR
- 1999: APR
- 2000: APR
- 2001: APR
- 2002: APR
- 2003: APR
- 2004: Espoir
- 2005: APR
- 2006: APR
- 2007: Marines
- 2008: APR
- 2009: APR
- 2010: Kigali Basketball Club
- 2011: Kigali Basketball Club
- 2012: Espoir
- 2013: Espoir
- 2014: Espoir
- 2015: Espoir
- 2016: Patriots
- 2017: REG
- 2018: Patriots
- 2019: Patriots
- 2020: Patriots
- 2021: REG
- 2022: REG
- 2023: APR
- 2024: APR
- 2025: APR
- 2026: APR

== Finals (2007–present) ==
The following is a list of the league's final playoff series, or if not applicable the season's final standings.

Season	Champions	Runners-up	Finals score	Ref.
2007	Marines	CSK		
2007–08	APR	Marines		
2008–09	APR			
2009–10	Kigali Basketball Club	APR	—N/a	
2010–11	Kigali Basketball Club			
2011–12	Espoir (1)	KBC	3–1	
2012–13	Espoir (2)	APR	3–0	
2013–14	Espoir (3)	APR	—N/a	
2014–15	Espoir (4)	Patriots	3–1	
2015–16	Patriots (1)	Espoir	—N/a	
2016–17	Patriots (2)	REG	3–1	
2017–18	Patriots (2)	REG	3–2	
2018–19	Patriots (3)	REG	4–3	
2019–20	Patriots (4)	REG	76–61	
2020–21	REG (1)	Patriots	2–0	
2021–22	REG (2)	Patriots	3–2	
2023	APR (14)	REG	4–0	
2024	APR (15)	Patriots	4–2	
2025	APR (16)	REG	4–2	
2026	APR (17)	Patriots	4–0	

== Performance by club ==
Club	Wins	Runners-up	Seasons won	Seasons runners-up
APR	17	2	1995, 1996, 1997, 1998, 1999, 2000, 2001, 2002, 2003, 2005, 2006, 2008, 2009, 2023, 2024, 2025, 2026	2013, 2014
Espoir	5	1	2004, 2012, 2013, 2014, 2015	2016
Patriots	4	5	2016, 2018, 2019, 2020	2017, 2021, 2022, 2024, 2026
REG	3	5	2017, 2021, 2022	2017, 2018, 2019, 2020, 2023, 2025
Kigali Basketball Club	2	1	2010, 2011	2012
Marines	1	1	2007	2008

== Individual awards ==
=== Most Valuable Player ===
After each RBL season, one player is named the Most valuable player of the competition. Olivier Shyaka is the only player to have won at least two MVP awards. Since the 2023 season, the RBL has an award for the best player in the regular season, as well as a separate one for the best player in the playoffs.

Most Valuable Player winners
Season	Player	Club	Ref.
Season MVP
2012	Aristide Mugabe	Espoir	
2013	Bienvenu Ngandu	Espoir (2)	
2014	Mike Buzangu	Cercle Sportif de Kigali	
2015	Olivier Shyaka	Espoir (3)	
2016	Kubwimana Kazingufu Ali	Patriots	
2017	Kami Kabange	REG	
2018	Sedar Sagamba	Patriots (2)	
2019	Dieudonné Ndizeye	Patriots (3)	
2021	Olivier Shyaka (2)	REG (2)	
2022	Axel Mpoyo	REG (3)	
Regular Season MVP
2023	Olivier Turatsinze	Espoir (4)	
2024	Chad Jordan	Kepler	
2025	Aliou Diarra	APR	
2026	Garba Chingka Kennedy	Patriots (4)	

=== Playoffs MVP ===
Since 2023, the league also gives an award to the best performing player of the playoffs.

Playoffs MVP winners
Season	Player	Club	Ref.
2023	Jean Jacques Nshobozwabyosenumukiza	APR	
2024	Isaiah Miller	APR	
2025	Youssou Ndoye	APR	
2026	Craig Randall II	APR	

=== Defensive Player of the Year ===
Defensive Player of the Year winners
Season	Player	Club	Ref.
2023	Frank Kamdoh	UGB	
2024	Pitchou Kambuy Manga	REG	
2025	Chinka Garba	Orion	
2026	Chinka Garba (2)	Patriots	

=== Most Improved Player ===
Most Improved Player winners
Season	Player	Club	Ref.
2024	Fabrice "Musinza" Muhoza	Espoir	
2025	Eric Kayondo	UGB	
2026	Hubert Sage	Patriots	

=== Coach of the Year ===
Coach of the Year winners
Season	Player	Club	Ref.
2025	James Maye Jr.	APR	
2026	Sunny Niyomugabo	Patriots	

=== Team of the Year ===
Players in bold were named the season's Most Valuable Player.

RBL Team of the Year selections (2014–present)
Season	Players					Coach of the Year
Season	PG	SG	SF	PF	C	Coach of the Year
2014–15	Aristide Mugabe (Espoir)	Mike Buzangu (KBC)	Lionnel Hakizimana (Espoir)	**Olivier Shyaka** (Espoir)	Bienvenue Ngandu (Espoir)	
2016–17	Aristide Mugabe (Patriots)	Benjamin Mukengerwa (REG)	Dieudonné Ndizeye (iPRC-Kigali)	Olivier Shyaka (Espoir)	**Kami Kabange** (REG)	
2019–20	Guibert Nijimbere (REG)	Wilson Nshobozwa (REG)	**Dieudonné Ndizeye** (Patriots)	Bienvenu Niyonsaba (APR)	Junior Kasongo (Patriots)	Henry Mwinuka (REG)
2020–21	Adonis Filer (REG)	Engelbert Beleck Bell (Patriots)	Dieudonné Ndizeye (Patriots)	**Olivier Shyaka** (REG)	Tom Wamukota (Patriots)	Henry Mwinuka (REG)
2021–22	Adonis Filer (REG)	Kenny Gasana (Patriots)	Steven Hagumintwari (Patriots)	**Axel Mpoyo** (REG)	Pitchou Kambuy Manga (REG)	Henry Mwinuka (REG)
2023	Not announced					Maz Trakh (APR)
2024	Not announced					Henry Mwinuka (Patriots)
2025	Not announced					James Maye Jr. (APR)
2026	Not announced					Sunny Niyomugabo (Patriots)

== In African competitions ==
Each year, the champions of the NBL were placed for the qualifiers of the FIBA Africa Basketball League, the premiere pan-African competition. Since 2020, this league is replaced by the Basketball Africa League (BAL). The following list shows Rwandan teams which played in a main tournament:

Rwandan participants in the FIBA Africa Basketball League / BAL
Club	Participations	Seasons	Best result
APR	5	2007, 2008, 2009, 2024, 2025	(bronze) 3rd place (2009)
REG	2	2022, 2023	Quarterfinals (2022)
Patriots	1	2021	Fourth place (2021)
RSSB Tigers	1	2026	(gold) Champions (2026)

=== In the Basketball Africa League ===
Since the 2023 season, the champions of the RBL qualify directly to the BAL, as the competition has determined them as designated market.

Season	Representative	Road to BAL				Main competition		
Season	Representative	W	L	Result	Qualified	W	L	Result
2021	Patriots	9	0	Gold	Yes	3	3	Fourth place
2022	REG	Qualified directly			Yes	4	2	Quarter-finals
2023	REG	Qualified directly			Yes	3	3	Quarter-finals
2024	APR	Qualified directly			Yes	2	4	Conference stage
2025	APR	Qualified directly			Yes	6	4	Bronze
2026	RSSB Tigers	Qualified directly			Yes	7	1	Gold
Total		9	0			25	17	

== See also ==
- Rwanda Basketball League Division 2
- Rwanda Basketball Cup
- Heroes' Cup (Rwanda)
- FERWABA
