= Espoir BBC =

Professional basketball team in Rwanda

Espoir
- Leagues: National Basketball League
- Founded: 2003
- History: Espoir BBC; 2003–present
- Location: Kigali, Rwanda
- Head coach: Kamanzi Venuste
- Championships: 5 Rwandan Leagues
Home	Away

Team Espoir BBC in 2013

Espoir BBC is a Rwandan professional basketball club based in Kigali. The club competes in Rwanda's National Basketball League.

Traditionally, the club has provided several of Africa's national teams with key players.

== Honours ==
- National Basketball League: 5

2003–04, 2011–12, 2012–13, 2013–14, 2014–15

== Current roster ==
Note: Flags indicate national team eligibility at FIBA-sanctioned events. Players may hold other non-FIBA nationalities not displayed.

Espoir BBC Kigali roster
Players
Coaches

Pos.	No.	Nat.	Name
		(Democratic Republic of the Congo)	Patrick Mupanda P.
G/F		(Rwanda)	Olivier Shyaka (C)
		(Rwanda)	Aristide Mugabe
		(Rwanda)	Lionel Hakizimana
		(Rwanda)	Aboubakar Ally Barame

Head coach

(Rwanda) Kamanzi Venuste

Assistant coach(es)

Uwineza Valery

Legend

- (C) Team captain
- Injured

- Roster
Updated: 16 October 2016

== Notable players ==
Note: Flags indicate national team eligibility at FIBA-sanctioned events. Players may hold other non-FIBA nationalities not displayed.

Criteria

To appear in this section a player must have either:

- Set a club record or won an individual award while at the club
- Played at least one official international match for their national team at any time
- Played at least one official NBA match at any time.

- (Rwanda) Lionel Hakizimana
- (Rwanda) Kami Kabangu
- (Rwanda) Aristide Mugabe
- (Democratic Republic of the Congo) Presta Nzuzi Malemba
- (Gabon) Dean Bezazouma

== Season by season ==
Playoffs berth

Including since the 2022 season.

Season	Tier	League	Regular season					Postseason	Head coach
Season	Tier	League	Finish	Played	Wins	Losses	Win %	Postseason	Head coach
Espoir BBC
2022	1	RBL	5th	24	14	10	.583	Did not qualify	Kamanzi Venuste
2023	1	RBL	4th	22	15	7	.667	Lost semifinals (REG) 0–2; Won third place series (Patriots) 1–0	Kamanzi Venuste
2024	1	RBL	5th	18	9	9	.500	Did not qualify	Kamanzi Venuste
2025	1	RBL	9th	16	2	14	.125	Did not qualify	Kamanzi Venuste
Regular season record				80	40	40	.500	0 regular season champions	
Playoffs record				3	1	2	.333	5 NBL/RBL championships	
