= RSSB Tigers =

- League: Rwanda Basketball League; Basketball Africa League
- Founded: 2019
- History: Tigers BBC (2019–2026); RSSB Tigers (2026–present)
- Location: Kigali, Rwanda
- Team colors: Blue, Gold, and White
- Chairman: Francis Shyaka
- Head coach: Henry Mwinuka
- Ownership: Francis Shyaka
- Website: tigers.rw
Home	Away

RSSB Tigers, formerly known as Tigers BBC, are a Rwandan semi-professional basketball team based in Kigali. Founded in 2019, it entered the Rwanda Basketball League (RBL) in the same year. The team has also competed in the Basketball Africa League (BAL) regularly.

== History ==
The club was founded by entrepreneur and former basketball player Francis Shyaka. The Tigers' best result was their 4th place in the 2021–22 season and their participation in the semifinals. In December 2024, the team signed Henry Mwinuka, a five-time winning RBL coach, as their new head coach.

The Tigers won their first trophy when they won the Rwanda Basketball Cup in 2025. At the end of the season, the Rwanda Social Security Board (RSSB) assumed full ownership over the team, and thus the team was re-named RSSB Tigers.

In the beginning of the following 2026 season, they also won the Super Cup.

On March 23, 2026, it was confirmed the Tigers would play in the Basketball Africa League (BAL) for the first time in history, as the champions APR were forced to withdraw due to American sanctions on the Rwandan military, which owns the team.

== Arena ==
Since its establishment, the Tigers have played in several courts provided by the Rwanda Basketball League (RBL), however, the team has plans to construct an own arena in the future.

== Honours ==
- Rwanda Basketball Cup
  - Winners (1): 2025
- Rwanda Basketball Super Cup
  - Winners (1): 2026
- Basketball Africa League
  - Winners (1): 2026

== Season by season ==
Playoffs berth

Season	Tier	League	Regular season					Postseason	Cup competitions	Head coach
Season	Tier	League	Finish	Played	Wins	Losses	Win %	Postseason	Cup competitions	Head coach
Tigers BBC
2020–21	1	NBL	13th (Note: Includes games in both Stage One and Stage Two.)	14	5	9	.357	Did not qualify		Robert Mugabe
2022	1	RBL	4th	24	15	9	.625	Lost semifinals (Patriots) 0–2		Robert Mugabe
2023	1	RBL	7th	22	11	11	.500	Did not qualify		Robert Mugabe
2024	1	RBL	7th	18	8	10	.444	Did not qualify	Quarterfinalist (RC)	Robert Mugabe
2025	1	RBL	5th	16	10	6	.625	Did not qualify	Winner (RC)	Robert Mugabe
Regular season record				94	49	45	.521	0 regular season champions		
Playoffs record				2	0	2	.000	0 championships		
