= Rwanda Basketball League Division 2 =

Second level basketball league in Rwanda

Rwanda Basketball League D2
- Organising body: FERWABA
- Founded: 1 December 2021; 3 years ago
- First season: 2021–22
- Country: Rwanda
- Confederation: FIBA Africa
- Number of teams: 24
- Level on pyramid: 2
- Promotion to: Rwanda Basketball League
- Current champions: Azomco (1st title) (2023–24)
- Most championships: Azomco; Kigali Titans; Inspired Generation (1 title each)

The Rwanda Basketball League Division 2 is the second-highest men's basketball competition in Rwanda, after the Rwanda Basketball League (RBL). On 1 December 2021, the FERWABA announced the creation of the new competition. Its inaugural season began on April 1, 2022, with sixteen teams divided in three groups. As of 2024, the league has 24 teams.

The champions and runners-up of the league are promoted to the Rwanda Basketball League for the following season.

== Teams ==
The following 24 teams make up the Division 2 in the 2024 season.

Group	Team Name
A	Agahozo
A	Azomco
A	IPRC-Musanze
A	Nyagatare
A	Rebero
A	UR Huye
B	Black Thunders
B	Flame
B	Greater Virunga
B	IPRC-Huye
B	ITS Gasogi
B	Kicukiro Buckets
C	EAUR
C	Igihozo Ste Peter
C	Intare
C	UR-Kigali
C	WIBENA
D	Elite
D	IPRC-Kigali
D	Karongi
D	Keplerian
D	The Hoops
D	UoK

== Champions ==
Season	Champions	Runners-up	Finals score	Ref.
2021–22	Kigali Titans	Orion	2–0	
2022–23	Inspired Generation	Kepler	3–0	
2024	Azomco	Keplerians	3–0	

== Pre-season tournament ==
=== Champions ===
Season	Champions	Runners-up	Finals score	Third place	Ref.
2021–22	Kigali Titans	Orion	70–61	Inspired Generation	
