= Rwanda Basketball Federation =

- Founded: 1974; 52 years ago
- Affiliation: FIBA
- Regional affiliation: FIBA Africa
- Headquarters: Kigali
- President: Desire Mugwiza

Official website
- ferwaba.web.geniussports.com

The Rwandan Basketball Federation (French: Fédération Rwandaise de Basketball) is the governing body of basketball in Rwanda. It operates the Rwanda national basketball team as well as the top-tier NBL and other amateur leagues.

== History ==
In 1930, basketball was first brought to Rwanda by catholic priests and the first games were played in high schools in the South Province. After the independence in 1962, new teams were created in the army and from some public institutions. In 1974, the Rwandan Basketball Federation was created and the first national league started three years later.
