= 2023 BAL season rosters =

Listing of all rosters in the 2023 season of the Basketball Africa League

The following page has an overview of the rosters of all twelve teams of the 2023 season of the Basketball Africa League (BAL). All teams were allowed to register a 12-man roster, with the restriction that only four foreign players can be registered. Of these four foreign players, only two can have a non-African nationality. Additionally, each roster featured a drafted prospect from the NBA Academy Africa, under the BAL Elevate program.

Teams were allowed to switch players during the period between the Conference stage and the playoffs. In the 2023 season, six teams made changes to their rosters ahead of the playoffs.

The BAL revealed the rosters for the Sahara Conference on 11 March 2023, the rosters for the Nile Conference were published on 24 April 2023.

Eleven players that played in the 2023 BAL season also participated with their national teams in the 2023 FIBA Basketball World Cup.

== ABC Fighters ==
Note: Flags indicate national team eligibility at FIBA-sanctioned events. Players may hold other non-FIBA nationalities not displayed.

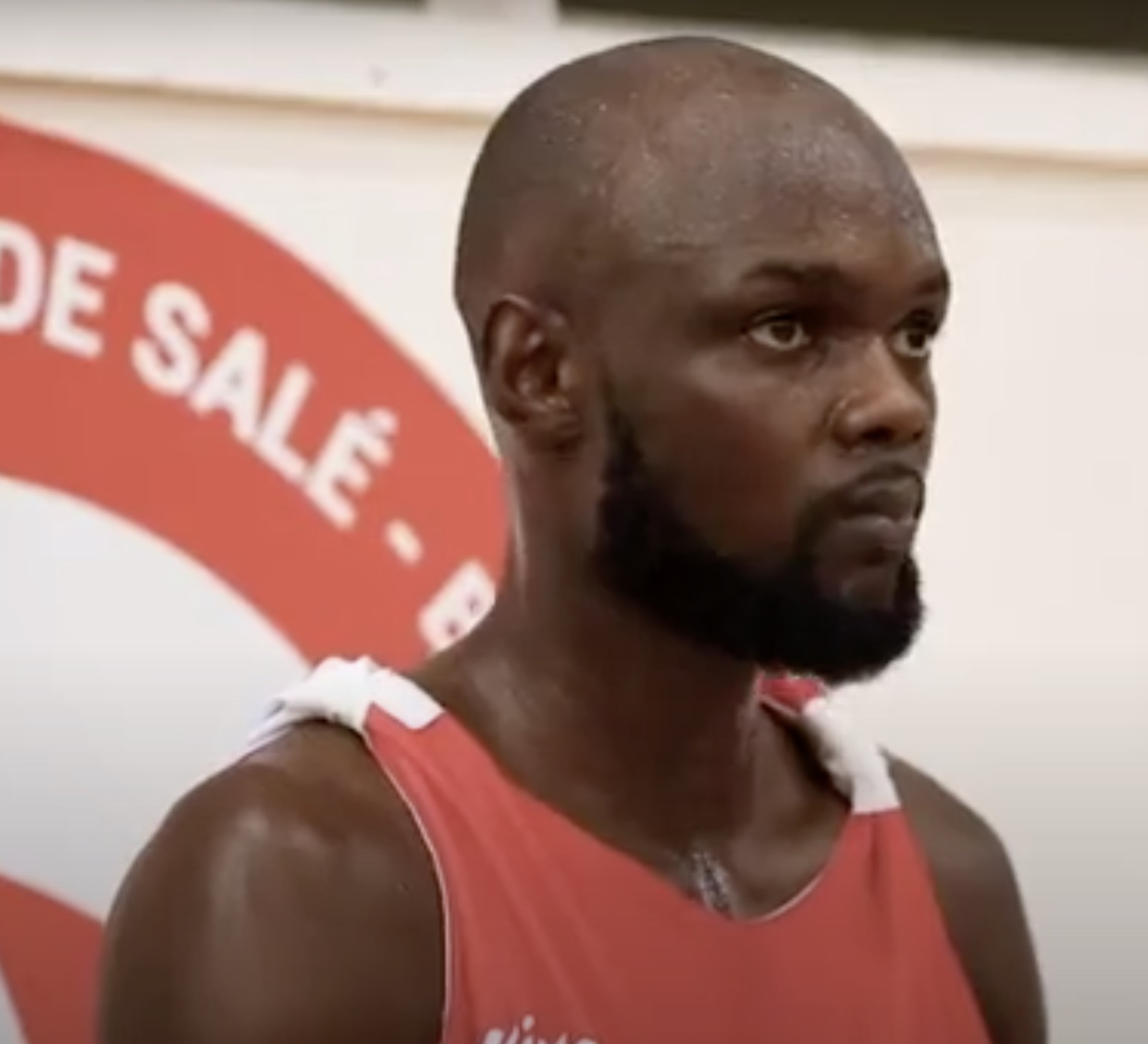
Abdoulaye Harouna, who had two BAL seasons of experience, was the leading scorer for the ABC Fighters

ABC Fighters roster
Players
Coaches

Pos.	No.	Nat.	Name	Ht.	Age
G	1	(United States)	Robinson, Alex (I)	1.85 m (6 ft 1 in)	29 – 20 May 1995
G	2	(Ivory Coast)	Kra, Ulrich	1.86 m (6 ft 1 in)	32 – 10 July 1992
PG	5	(Ivory Coast)	Koné, Faman	1.83 m (6 ft 0 in)	26 – 6 March 1999
PF	6	(Ivory Coast)	Sylla, Hamadou	2.02 m (6 ft 8 in)	28 – 27 May 1996
PF	7	(Nigeria)	Obekpa, Chris (I)	2.06 m (6 ft 9 in)	31 – 14 November 1993
SG	10	(Niger)	Harouna, Abdoulaye (I)	1.96 m (6 ft 5 in)	32 – 12 December 1992
G	12	(Nigeria)	Ighovodja, Joy (E)	1.90 m (6 ft 3 in)	20 – 12 October 2004
SF	13	(Ivory Coast)	Fofana, Mike	2.06 m (6 ft 9 in)	27 – 5 October 1997
SG	14	(Ivory Coast)	Diarra, Ismael	1.95 m (6 ft 5 in)	25 – 22 April 1999
SG	15	(Ivory Coast)	Konaté, Stéphane (C)	1.91 m (6 ft 3 in)	44 – 23 August 1980
PF	23	(South Sudan)	Bile, Chudier (I)	2.01 m (6 ft 7 in)	26 – 7 July 1998
PF	24	(Ivory Coast)	Koné, Moussa	2.03 m (6 ft 8 in)	24 – 20 November 2000
SF	45	(Ivory Coast)	Yao, Kouadio	1.89 m (6 ft 2 in)	22 – 7 October 2002

Head coach

- (Australia) Liz Mills

Assistant coach(es)

- (Ivory Coast) Eric Minotte

Legend

- (C) Team captain
- Injured

- Roster
Updated: 25 September 2023

== Al Ahly ==
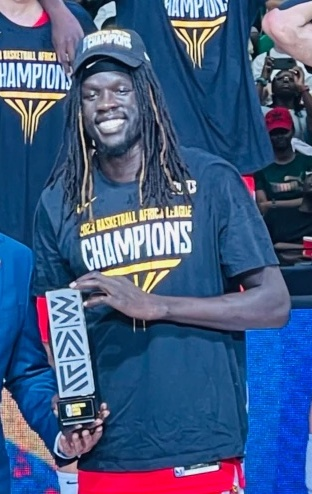
Al Ahly's Nuni Omot won MVP honours in his first BAL season

Note: Flags indicate national team eligibility at FIBA-sanctioned events. Players may hold other non-FIBA nationalities not displayed.

Al Ahly roster
Players
Coaches

Pos.	No.	Nat.	Name	Ht.	Age
PG	2	(United States)	Thompson, Michael (I)	1.77 m (5 ft 10 in)	36 – 9 February 1989
PF	4	(Egypt)	Sarhan, Marwan	2.03 m (6 ft 8 in)	32 – 2 May 1992
F	6	(Egypt)	Gendy, Amr	1.93 m (6 ft 4 in)	33 – 14 June 1991
F	7	(South Sudan)	Omot, Nuni (I)	2.06 m (6 ft 9 in)	30 – 3 October 1994
PF	10	(Mali)	Camara, Dramane (E)	1.95 m (6 ft 5 in)	21 – 24 January 2004
G	12	(Egypt)	Azab, Omar	1.91 m (6 ft 3 in)	26 – 5 April 1998
PG	13	(Egypt)	Tarek, Moamen	1.90 m (6 ft 3 in)	22 – 1 January 2003
SF	14	(Egypt)	Zahran, Amr	1.91 m (6 ft 3 in)	23 – 6 October 2001
SG	15	(New Zealand)	Webster, Corey (I)	1.88 m (6 ft 2 in)	36 – 29 November 1988
SF	23	(Egypt)	Aboelnasr, Mohamed	1.90 m (6 ft 3 in)	33 – 15 August 1991
C	24	(Egypt)	Samir, Seif (C)	2.03 m (6 ft 8 in)	31 – 5 June 1993
PF	28	(Nigeria)	Fakuade, Michael (I)	2.01 m (6 ft 7 in)	36 – 18 February 1989
C	34	(Egypt)	Ismail, Ahmed	2.08 m (6 ft 10 in)	30 – 21 January 1995
C	41	(Egypt)	Oraby, Omar	2.18 m (7 ft 2 in)	33 – 8 September 1991
G	45	(Egypt)	Amin, Ehab	1.85 m (6 ft 1 in)	29 – 1 August 1995

Head coach

- (Spain) Augustí Julbe

Assistant coach(es)

- (Egypt) Ahmed Elgarhi
- (Egypt) Ramy Abousamra

Legend

- (C) Team captain
- Injured

- Roster
Updated: September 25, 2023

== AS Douanes ==
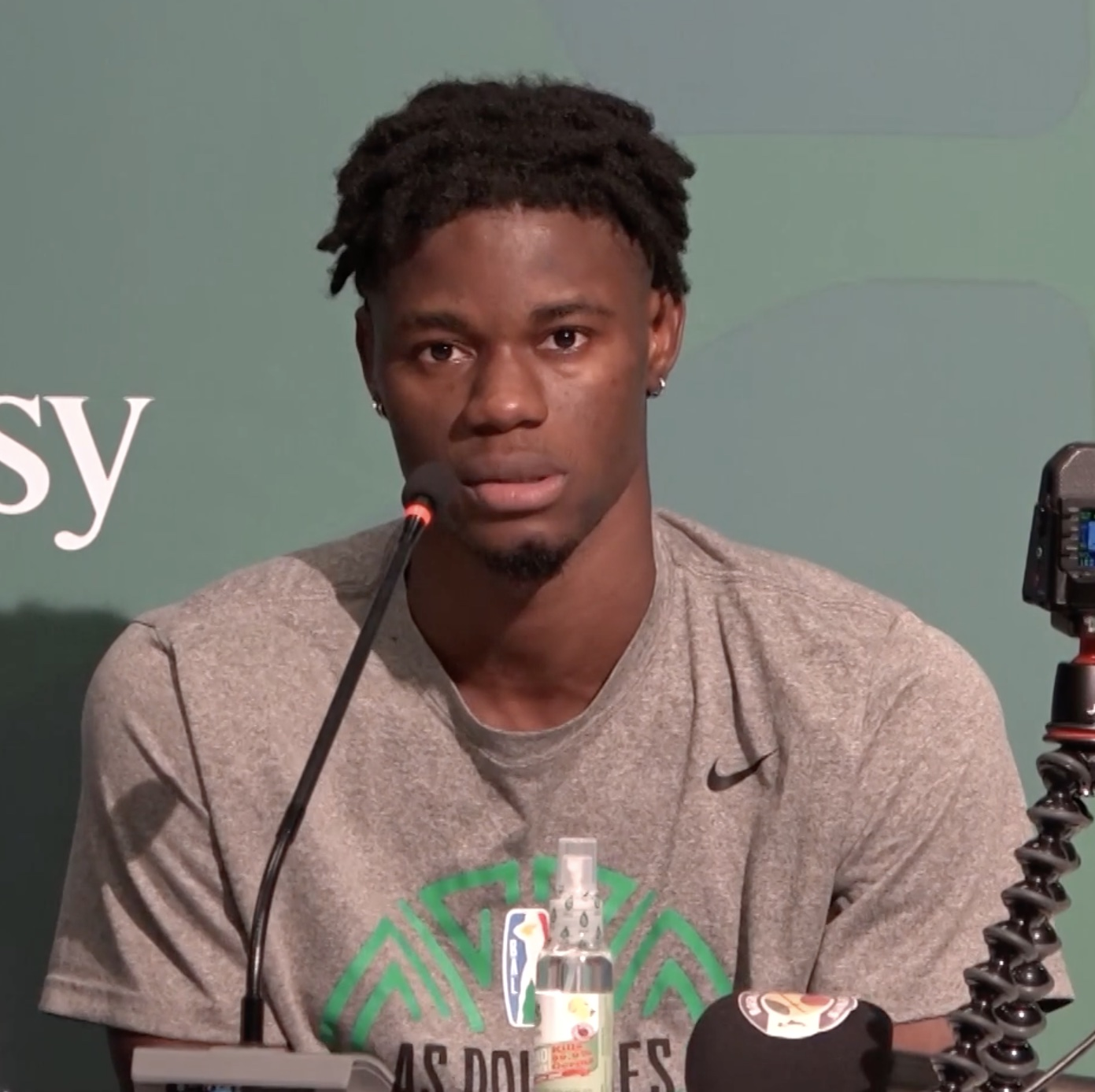
Senegalese point guard Jean Jacques Boissy was named to the All-BAL First Team

AS Douanes roster
Players
Coaches

Pos.	No.	Nat.	Name	Ht.	Age	From
PG	00	(Senegal)	Ndour, Alkaly (C)	1.93 m (6 ft 4 in)	28 – 2 March 1997
SG	1	(United States)	Crawford, Chris (I)	1.94 m (6 ft 4 in)	32 – 30 September 1992
SF	2	(Senegal)	Fall, Samba Daly	2.03 m (6 ft 8 in)	26 – 17 January 1999
C	4	(South Sudan)	Maluach, Khaman (E)	2.18 m (7 ft 2 in)	18 – 13 September 2006
G	5	(Senegal)	Boissy, Jean Jacques	1.83 m (6 ft 0 in)	24 – 28 January 2001
SF	7	(Senegal)	Diop, Bara	2.01 m (6 ft 7 in)	32 – 14 August 1992
SG	10	(Senegal)	Dieng, Madiara	1.96 m (6 ft 5 in)	29 – 20 November 1995
PF	11	(Ghana)	Osei, Bryan (I)	2.06 m (6 ft 9 in)	36 – 9 May 1988
SF	12	(Senegal)	Ndiaye, Bara	2.05 m (6 ft 9 in)	21 – 6 October 2003
F/C	15	(Senegal)	Diagne, Mouhamadou		28 – 18 January 1997
SF	23	(Senegal)	Kamara, Cheikh Ahmet	1.98 m (6 ft 6 in)	31 – 14 February 1994
C	34	(Nigeria)	Ochereobia, Ifeanyichukwu (I)	1.96 m (6 ft 5 in)	35 – 27 July 1989
SG	41	(United States)	Stoglin, Terrell (I)	1.85 m (6 ft 1 in)	33 – 10 November 1991

Head coach

- (Senegal) Pabi Guèye

Assistant coach(es)

- (Senegal) Parfait Advijon

Legend

- (C) Team captain
- Injured

- Roster

== Cape Town Tigers ==
Note: Flags indicate national team eligibility at FIBA-sanctioned events. Players may hold other non-FIBA nationalities not displayed.

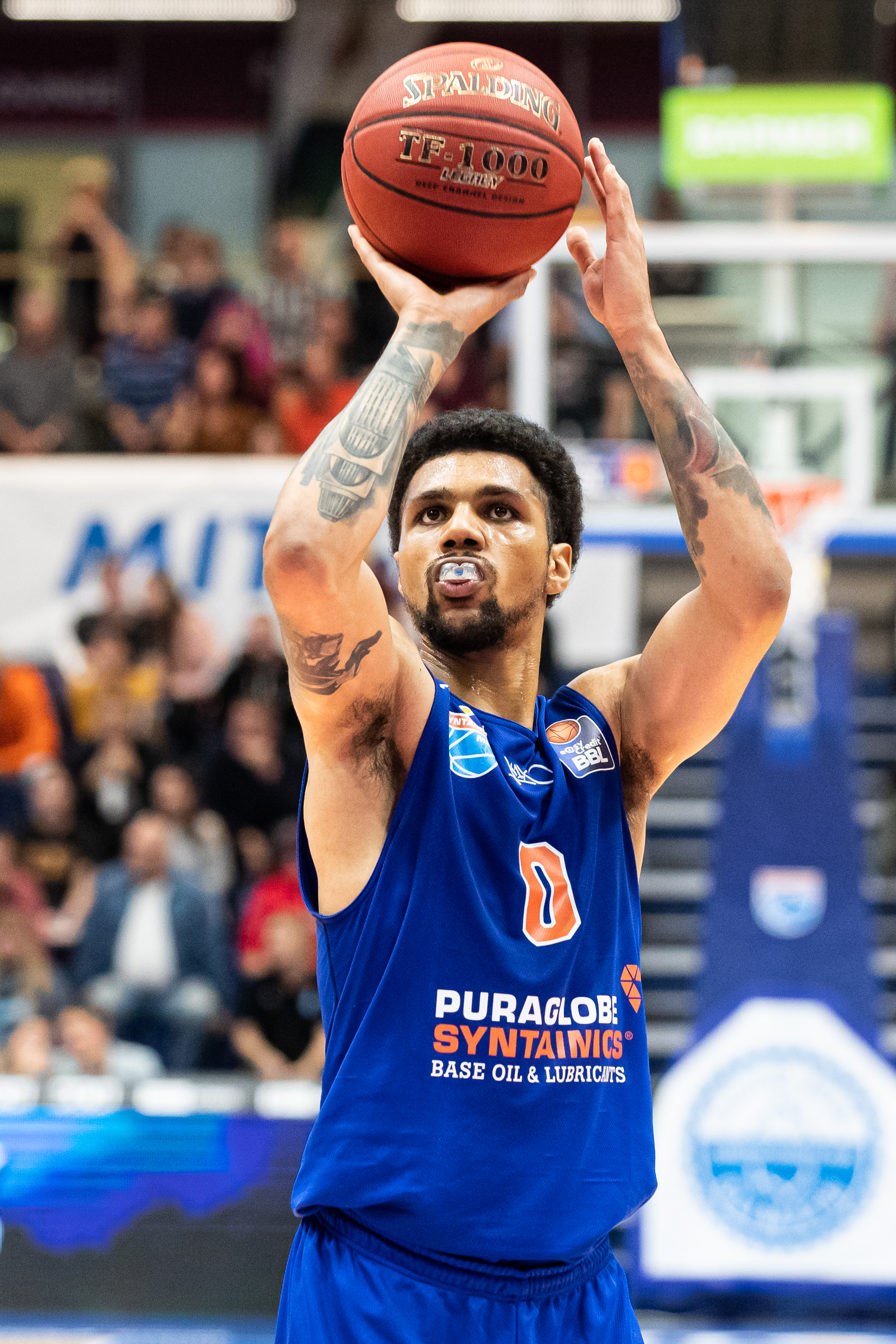
Michael Gbinije played for the Cape Town Tigers in his first BAL season

Cape Town Tigers roster
Players
Coaches

Pos.	No.	Nat.	Name	Ht.	Age
G	00	(United States)	Wade, Zaire (I)	1.91 m (6 ft 3 in)	23 – 4 February 2002
G/F	1	(Central African Republic)	Ganapamo, Evans (I)	2.01 m (6 ft 7 in)	30 – 19 August 1994
G	2	(Nigeria)	Gbinije, Michael (I)	2.01 m (6 ft 7 in)	32 – 5 June 1992
F	5	(South Africa)	Hall, Josh	2.06 m (6 ft 9 in)	24 – 8 October 2000
C	7	(South Africa)	Mthembu, Somusa	2.08 m (6 ft 10 in)	32 – 26 March 1992
CG	10	(South Africa)	Selepe, Lebesa	1.93 m (6 ft 4 in)	34 – 13 March 1991
G/F	11	(South Africa)	Mofokeng, Lebo	1.94 m (6 ft 4 in)	32 – 24 April 1992
G	12	(South Africa)	Whitbread, Dylan	1.91 m (6 ft 3 in)	30 – 27 October 1994
PF	14	(South Africa)	Sibanyoni, Nkosinathi	2.06 m (6 ft 9 in)	26 – 24 May 1998
G	15	(Democratic Republic of the Congo)	Musongela, Parby (E)		19 – 15 December 2005
G	23	(South Africa)	Cele, Samkelo	1.98 m (6 ft 6 in)	27 – 28 December 1997
C	34	(South Africa)	Reid, Liam	2.06 m (6 ft 9 in)	27 – 10 March 1998
C	41	(South Africa)	Prinsloo, Pieter (C)	2.08 m (6 ft 10 in)	33 – 7 January 1992
F	45	(United States)	Smith Jr., Marvin (I)	2.01 m (6 ft 7 in)	31 – 11 July 1993

Head coach

- (United States) Rasheed Hazzard

Assistant coach(es)

- (South Africa) Vincent Ntunja
- (South Africa) Mlungisi Ngwenya

Legend

- (C) Team captain
- Injured

- Roster
Updated: September 25, 2023

== City Oilers ==
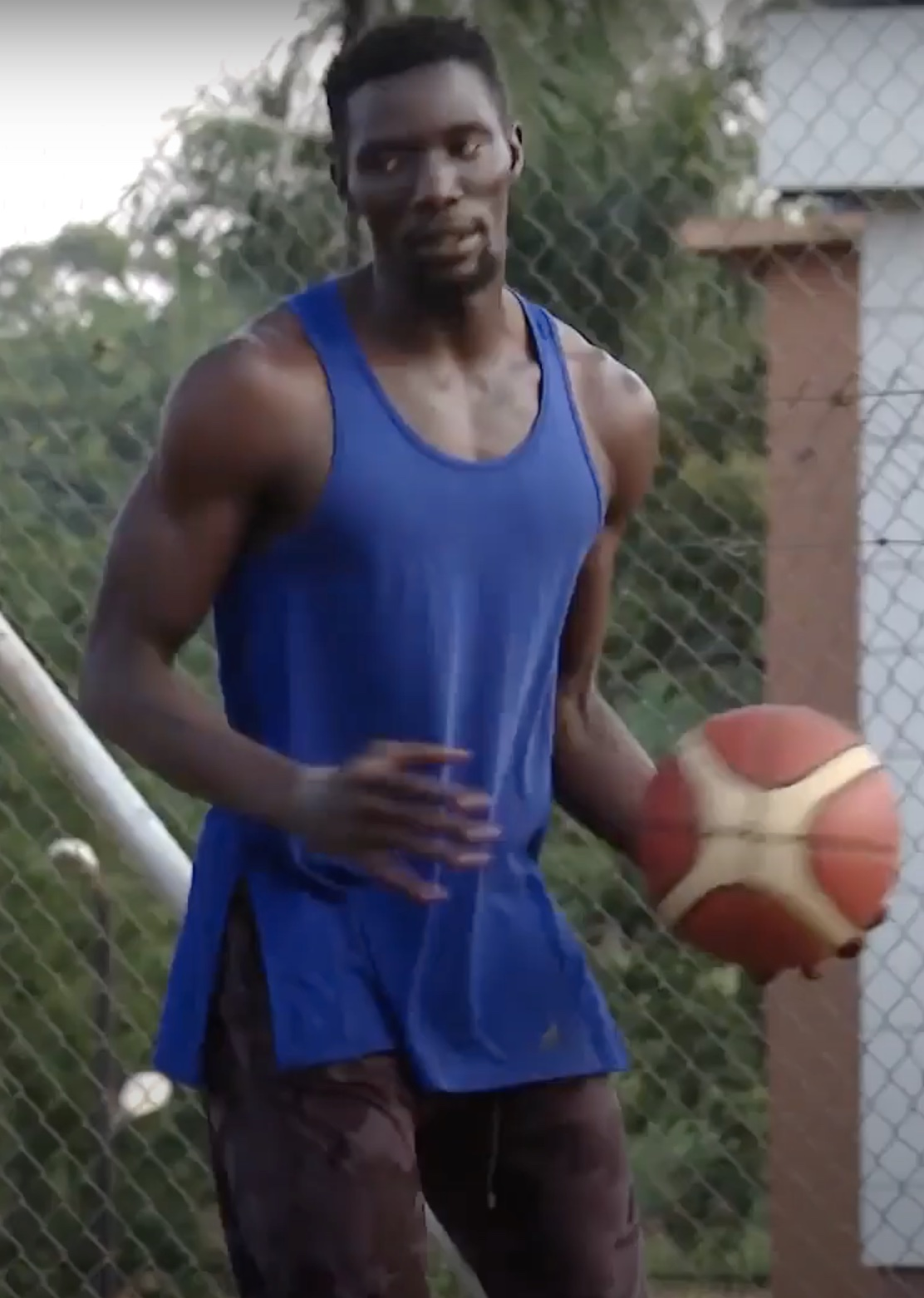
Long-time Oilers player Jimmy Enabu was on the City Oilers roster for their BAL debut

Note: Flags indicate national team eligibility at FIBA-sanctioned events. Players may hold other non-FIBA nationalities not displayed.

City Oilers roster
Players
Coaches

Pos.	No.	Nat.	Name	Ht.	Age
SG	0	(United States)	Justice Jr., James (I)	1.78 m (5 ft 10 in)	36 – 12 January 1989
PG	1	(Uganda)	Baale, Fayed	1.73 m (5 ft 8 in)	23 – 28 December 2001
SG	2	(Uganda)	Muhwezi, Ivan	1.82 m (6 ft 0 in)	27 – 19 January 1998
C	4	(Uganda)	Ghedi, Abdihakim	2.08 m (6 ft 10 in)	27 – 10 March 1998
PG	5	(Uganda)	Enabu, Jimmy	1.87 m (6 ft 2 in)	36 – 17 April 1988
PF	6	(Uganda)	Okello, James (C)	1.93 m (6 ft 4 in)	33 – 26 January 1992
SF	7	(United States)	Jones, Falando (I)	1.93 m (6 ft 4 in)	34 – 9 May 1990
SG	10	(Uganda)	Drileba, Tony	1.83 m (6 ft 0 in)	31 – 19 December 1993
G	11	(Nigeria)	Obe, Segun (E)		19 – 6 September 2005
PF	13	(Uganda)	Odeke, Titus	2.08 m (6 ft 10 in)	26 – 29 December 1998
SF	14	(Uganda)	Roebuck Jr., Germaine	1.96 m (6 ft 5 in)	27 – 29 July 1997
F	24	(Uganda)	Walujjo, Edrine	1.93 m (6 ft 4 in)	24 – 16 May 2000
G	28	(South Sudan)	Barnaba, Ngor (I)	2.06 m (6 ft 9 in)	29 – 8 March 1996

Head coach

(Uganda) Mandy Juruni

Assistant coach(es)

- (Uganda) Grace Kwizera

Legend

- (C) Team captain
- Injured

- Roster
Updated: September 25, 2023

== Ferroviário da Beira ==
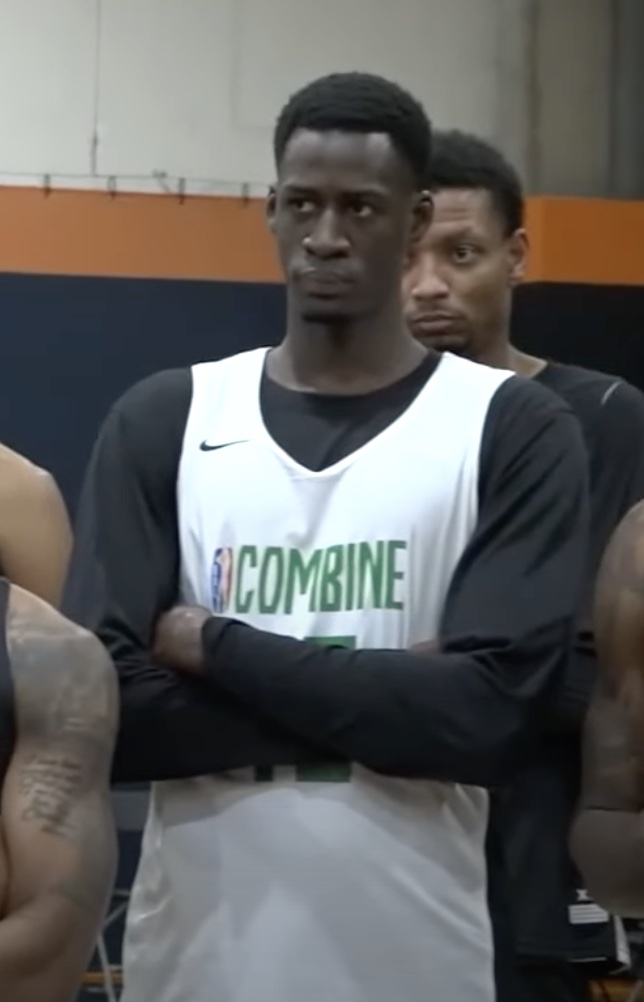
Makhtar Gueye played for Ferroviário da Beira

Note: Flags indicate national team eligibility at FIBA-sanctioned events. Players may hold other non-FIBA nationalities not displayed.

Ferroviário da Beira roster
Players
Coaches

Pos.	No.	Nat.	Name	Ht.	Age
G	0	(Mozambique)	Nurmamade, Ismael	1.85 m (6 ft 1 in)	33 – 3 December 1991
G	1	(Mozambique)	Malale, Hilario	1.85 m (6 ft 1 in)	24 – 11 May 2000
G	2	(Mozambique)	Mutacate, Daniel		21 – 14 September 2003
PG	4	(United States)	Young, Najeal (I)	1.98 m (6 ft 6 in)	31 – 27 February 1994
SF	7	(Senegal)	Gueye, Makhtar (I)	2.08 m (6 ft 10 in)	28 – 7 January 1997
C	10	(Mozambique)	Fijamo, Tomas		28 – 24 September 1996
PF	11	(Mozambique)	Houana, Elvis	1.93 m (6 ft 4 in)	37 – 18 August 1987
PG	12	(United States)	Perry, Will (I, C)	1.83 m (6 ft 0 in)	31 – 11 October 1993
SF	13	(Democratic Republic of the Congo)	Mbiya, Paul (E)		19 – 11 April 2005
F	15	(Mozambique)	Chirombe, Celio		25 – 6 January 2000
SF	23	(Mozambique)	Munguambe, Ayade	1.97 m (6 ft 6 in)	28 – 29 June 1996
C	24	(Mali)	Sidibe, Bourama (I)	2.08 m (6 ft 10 in)	27 – 1 November 1997
F	45	(Mozambique)	Barros, Luis De	1.88 m (6 ft 2 in)	38 – 17 March 1986

Head coach

- (Spain) Luiz Lopes Hernandez

Assistant coach(es)

- (Mozambique) Amarildo Taquidir
- (Mozambique) Amèrico Mapulango

Legend

- (C) Team captain
- Injured

- Roster
Updated: September 25, 2023

== Kwara Falcons ==
Note: Flags indicate national team eligibility at FIBA-sanctioned events. Players may hold other non-FIBA nationalities not displayed.

Kwara Falcons roster
Players
Coaches

Pos.	No.	Nat.	Name	Ht.	Age
G	00	(Nigeria)	Oriakhi, Michael	1.83 m (6 ft 0 in)	21 – 9 May 2003
PG	2	(Senegal)	Thiam, Modou Fall (E)		19 – 25 May 2005
PF	4	(Nigeria)	Adekoya, Jawad	1.98 m (6 ft 6 in)	31 – 4 January 1994
SF	7	(Nigeria)	Kolawole, Michael	1.95 m (6 ft 5 in)	27 – 7 August 1997
SG	10	(Nigeria)	Kareem, Ademola		27 – 8 October 1997
PF	13	(United States)	Wilson Jr., Anthony (I)	2.03 m (6 ft 8 in)	27 – 16 October 1997
SG	14	(Nigeria)	Ezeh, Victor (C)	1.93 m (6 ft 4 in)	22 – 12 February 2003
PF	15	(Nigeria)	Mohammed, Victor		22 – 3 April 2002
PF	23	(Sierra Leone)	Conteh, Sita (I)	2.03 m (6 ft 8 in)	26 – 3 August 1998
PG	24	(Nigeria)	Mordi, Jeremiah	1.94 m (6 ft 4 in)	32 – 7 January 1993
F/C	34	(United States)	Monyyong, Ruot (I)	2.10 m (6 ft 11 in)	27 – 14 February 1998
F/C	41	(Cameroon)	Nyemeck, Kevin (I)	2.00 m (6 ft 7 in)	23 – 7 October 2001
F/C	45	(Nigeria)	Akpejiori, Austin	2.06 m (6 ft 9 in)	27 – 9 August 1997

Head coach

(Nigeria) Baba Jubril

Assistant coach(es)

- (Nigeria) Babajide Arigbede
- (Nigeria) Azeez Bello

Legend

- (C) Team captain
- Injured

- Roster
Updated: September 25, 2023

== Petro de Luanda ==
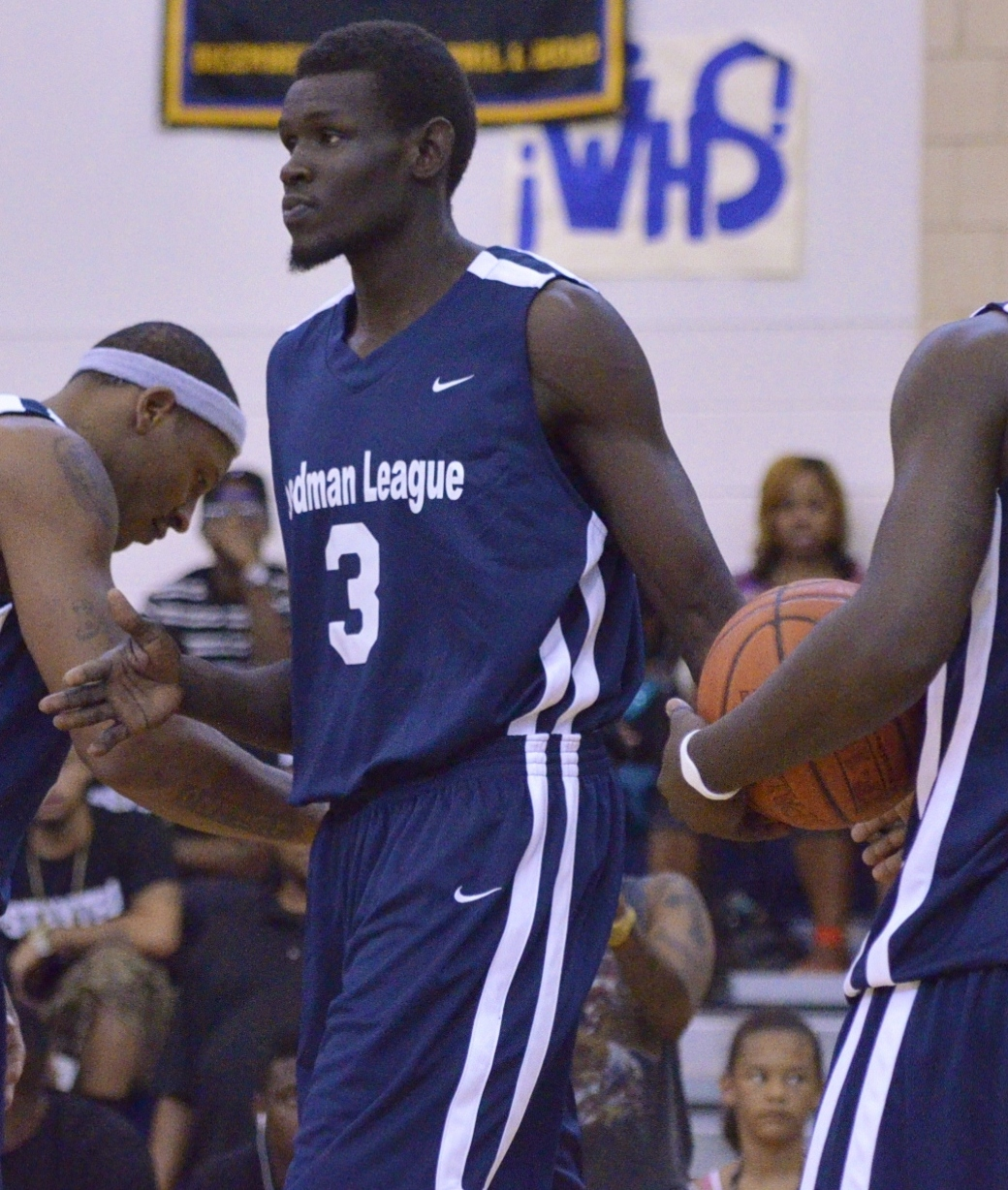
Ater Majok, the 2022 BAL Defensive Player of the Year, was Petro de Luanda's major reinforcement of the offseason

Note: Flags indicate national team eligibility at FIBA-sanctioned events. Players may hold other non-FIBA nationalities not displayed.

Petro de Luanda roster
Players
Coaches

Pos.	No.	Nat.	Name	Ht.	Age
PG	0	(Ivory Coast)	Diabate, Solo (I)	1.83 m (6 ft 0 in)	37 – 21 July 1987
PG	1	(Angola)	Domingos, Gerson	1.78 m (5 ft 10 in)	28 – 16 April 1996
PF	2	(Angola)	Chime, Anadji		19 – 5 September 2005
SF	4	(Angola)	Bastos, Pedro	1.92 m (6 ft 4 in)	32 – 8 January 1993
PG	5	(Angola)	Dundão, Childe	1.68 m (5 ft 6 in)	26 – 17 May 1998
SG	6	(Angola)	Morais, Carlos (C)	1.92 m (6 ft 4 in)	39 – 16 October 1985
C	7	(Angola)	Pedro, Jone	2.08 m (6 ft 10 in)	34 – 28 May 1990
CG	10	(Angola)	Gonçalves, Gerson	1.96 m (6 ft 5 in)	28 – 29 March 1996
C	13	(South Sudan)	Majok, Ater (I)	2.10 m (6 ft 11 in)	37 – 4 July 1987
PF	15	(Angola)	Gakou, Aboubakar	2.02 m (6 ft 8 in)	27 – 27 May 1997
G	23	(Egypt)	Hendawy, Seifeldin (E)	2.01 m (6 ft 7 in)	19 – 5 September 2005
PF	24	(Angola)	Buiamba, Glofate	2.00 m (6 ft 7 in)	26 – 5 January 1999
F	45	(Hungary)	Hollis, Damian (I)	2.03 m (6 ft 8 in)	36 – 19 August 1988

Head coach

- (Brazil) José Neto

Assistant coach(es)

- (Angola) Raùl Duarte
- (Angola) Víctor de Carvalho

Legend

- (C) Team captain
- Injured

- Roster
Updated: September 25, 2023

== REG ==
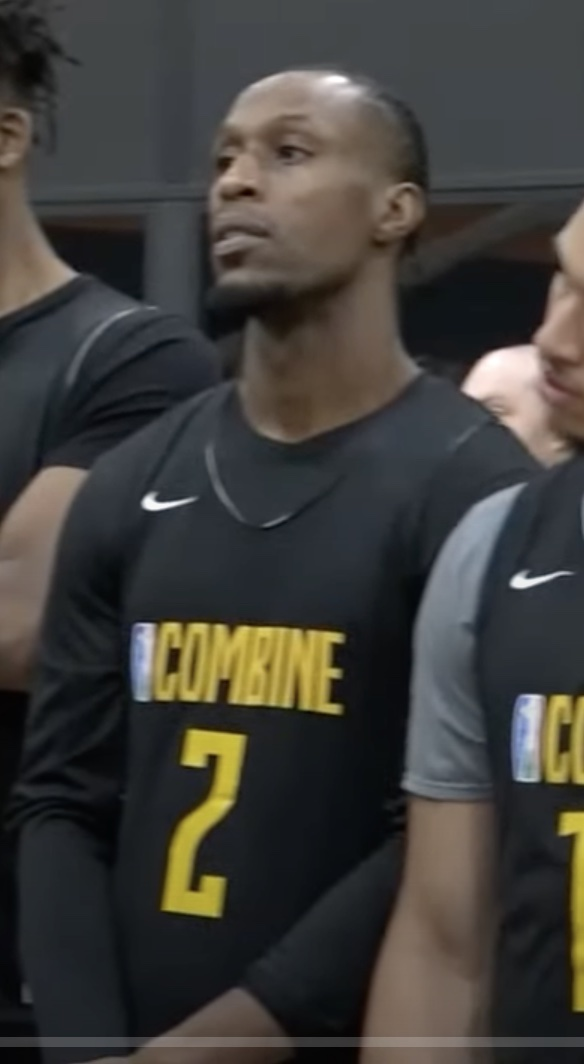
Adonis Filer represented REG

Note: Flags indicate national team eligibility at FIBA-sanctioned events. Players may hold other non-FIBA nationalities not displayed.

REG roster
Players
Coaches

Pos.	No.	Nat.	Name	Ht.	Age
PG	00	(Rwanda)	Filer, Adonis	1.83 m (6 ft 0 in)	31 – 11 July 1993
PG	1	(Rwanda)	Umuhoza, Jean De Dieu	1.75 m (5 ft 9 in)	23 – 1 June 2001
SF	2	(Rwanda)	Ndizeye, Dieudonné	1.98 m (6 ft 6 in)	28 – 14 October 1996
G	5	(United States)	Thomas, Cleveland (I)	1.93 m (6 ft 4 in)	31 – 2 December 1993
SF	7	(Rwanda)	Muhizi, Prince		29 – 1 January 1996
SF	10	(Rwanda)	Shyaka, Olivier (C)	2.00 m (6 ft 7 in)	29 – 14 August 1995
PG	11	(Rwanda)	Nshobozwabyosenumukiza, Jean Jacques	1.83 m (6 ft 0 in)	26 – 26 June 1998
PF	13	(Rwanda)	Hagumintwari, Steven	1.98 m (6 ft 6 in)	31 – 1 October 1993
C	14	(Cameroon)	Chomche, Ulrich (E)	2.11 m (6 ft 11 in)	19 – 30 December 2005
G	15	(Rwanda)	Habimana, Ntore	1.96 m (6 ft 5 in)	27 – 15 August 1997
F	24	(Rwanda)	Mpoyo, Axel	2.01 m (6 ft 7 in)	28 – 5 January 1997
C	34	(Democratic Republic of the Congo)	Manga, Pitchou Kambuy (I)	2.08 m (6 ft 10 in)	36 – 12 December 1988
PF	41	(United States)	Graham, Delwan (I)	2.01 m (6 ft 7 in)	36 – 27 October 1988
SF	45	(Rwanda)	Niyonkuru, Pascal	1.93 m (6 ft 4 in)	30 – 1 January 1995

Head coach

- (United States) Dean Murray

Assistant coach(es)

- (Rwanda) Maxime Mwisineza

Legend

- (C) Team captain
- Injured

- Roster
Updated: September 25, 2023

== SLAC ==
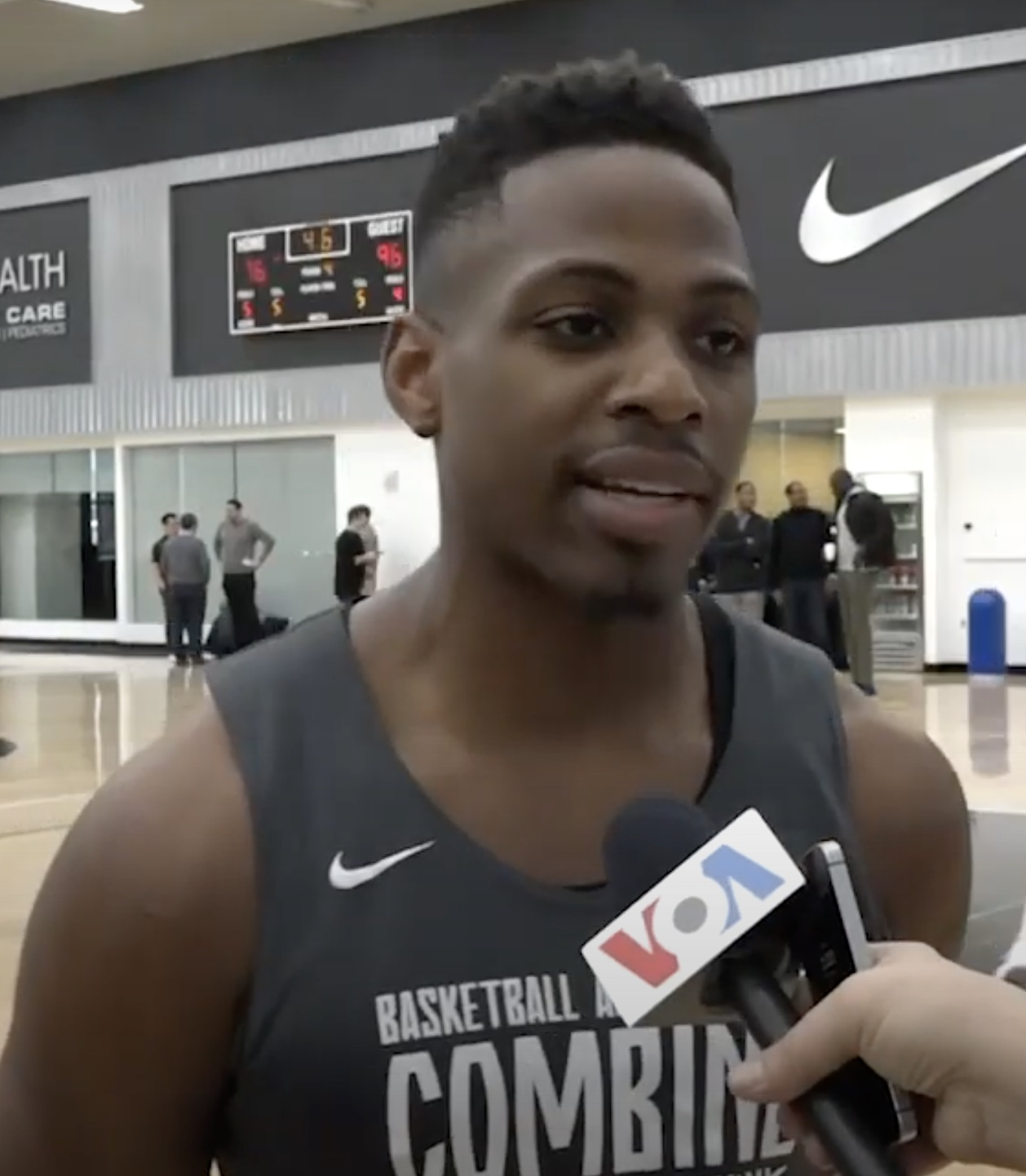
Uchenna Iroegbu made his BAL debut with SLAC

SLAC, playing in their second BAL season, brought back star players Dane Miller Jr. and Ibrahim Fofana.

SLAC roster
Players
Coaches

Pos.	No.	Nat.	Name	Ht.	Age	From
PG	1	(Nigeria)	Iroegbu, Uchenna (I)	1.83 m (6 ft 0 in)	28 – 20 August 1996
PG	2	(Philippines)	Barefield, Sedrick (I)	1.86 m (6 ft 1 in)	28 – 18 November 1996
SG	4	(Guinea)	Sompare, Aboubacar	2.02 m (6 ft 8 in)	19 – 16 August 2005
PG	5	(Nigeria)	Nwabuzor, Emeka (I)	1.88 m (6 ft 2 in)	29 – 14 March 1996
F	6	(Guinea)	Bah, Alseny	2.00 m (6 ft 7 in)	24 – 5 March 2001
SF	7	(Guinea)	Doumbouya, Ibrahima	1.98 m (6 ft 6 in)	27 – 7 October 1997
SF	10	(Guinea)	Keita, Balla Moussa	1.70 m (5 ft 7 in)	20 – 6 July 2004
CG	11	(Guinea)	Fofana, Ibrahim (C)	1.96 m (6 ft 5 in)	26 – 24 June 1998
PG	12	(Guinea)	Kaba, Alpha	1.80 m (5 ft 11 in)	21 – 27 February 2004
SF	13	(Guinea)	Conde, Ismael	2.00 m (6 ft 7 in)	32 – 7 May 1992
PF	15	(Guinea)	Mara, Mambourou	1.94 m (6 ft 4 in)	21 – 3 August 2003
F	23	(South Sudan)	Kon Mabil, Mabilwut (E)	2.08 m (6 ft 10 in)	19 – 9 May 2005
PF	24	(United States)	Miller Jr., Dane (I)	2.03 m (6 ft 8 in)	34 – 10 May 1990

Head coach

- (Serbia) Željko Zečević

Assistant coach(es)

- (Guinea) Mamadi Diane

Legend

- (C) Team captain
- Injured

- Roster

== Stade Malien ==
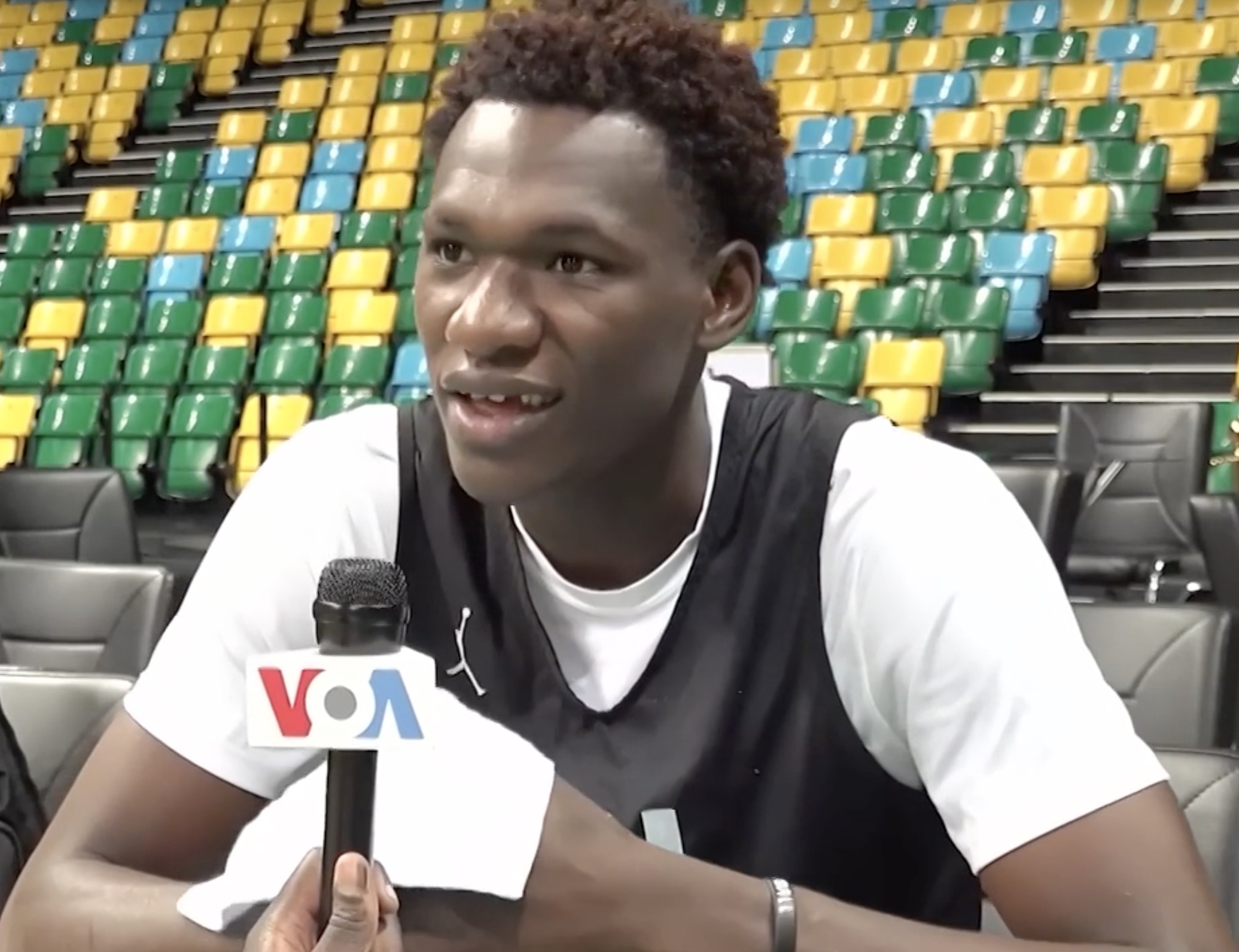
Aliou Diarra led Stade Malien to the third place medal

Note: Flags indicate national team eligibility at FIBA-sanctioned events. Players may hold other non-FIBA nationalities not displayed.

Stade Malien roster
Players
Coaches

Pos.	No.	Nat.	Name	Ht.	Age
PG	1	(Mali)	Keita, Makan (C)	1.83 m (6 ft 0 in)	25 – 8 May 1999
SG	2	(Mali)	Traoré, Namakan	1.93 m (6 ft 4 in)	26 – 16 April 1998
PF	5	(Mali)	Pare, Mohamed	1.98 m (6 ft 6 in)	28 – 1 November 1996
G	6	(Nigeria)	Amayo, Kelvin (I)	1.93 m (6 ft 4 in)	33 – 9 January 1992
G	7	(Mali)	Bagayoko, Oumar		32 – 11 March 1993
SG	10	(Mali)	Keita, Mamadou	1.92 m (6 ft 4 in)	32 – 1 February 1993
SF	12	(Mali)	Konate, Tamandjan	1.99 m (6 ft 6 in)	22 – 2 November 2002
F	13	(Mali)	Diallo, Ibrahima	2.06 m (6 ft 9 in)	26 – 8 May 1998
G	14	(Mali)	Sissouma, Soumaila	1.86 m (6 ft 1 in)	23 – 1 December 2001
C	15	(Mali)	Diarra, Aliou	2.06 m (6 ft 9 in)	23 – 31 December 2001
SF	23	(Mali)	Berthé, Souleymane	2.00 m (6 ft 7 in)	24 – 5 October 2000
C	24	(Nigeria)	Chinyelu, Rueben (E)	2.11 m (6 ft 11 in)	21 – 30 September 2003
PF	28	(United States)	Brigeforth, Brian (I)	2.08 m (6 ft 10 in)	30 – 3 June 1994
PF	34	(Morocco)	Wilkins, John (I)	2.08 m (6 ft 10 in)	35 – 13 July 1989
PG	45	(United States)	Foster, Gregory Clay (I)	1.90 m (6 ft 3 in)	35 – 8 June 1989

Head coach

- (Mali) Kaba Kanté

Assistant coach(es)

- (Mali) Boubacar Kanouté
- (Mali) Abdrahamane Maïga

Legend

- (C) Team captain
- Injured

- Roster
Updated: September 25, 2023

== US Monastir ==
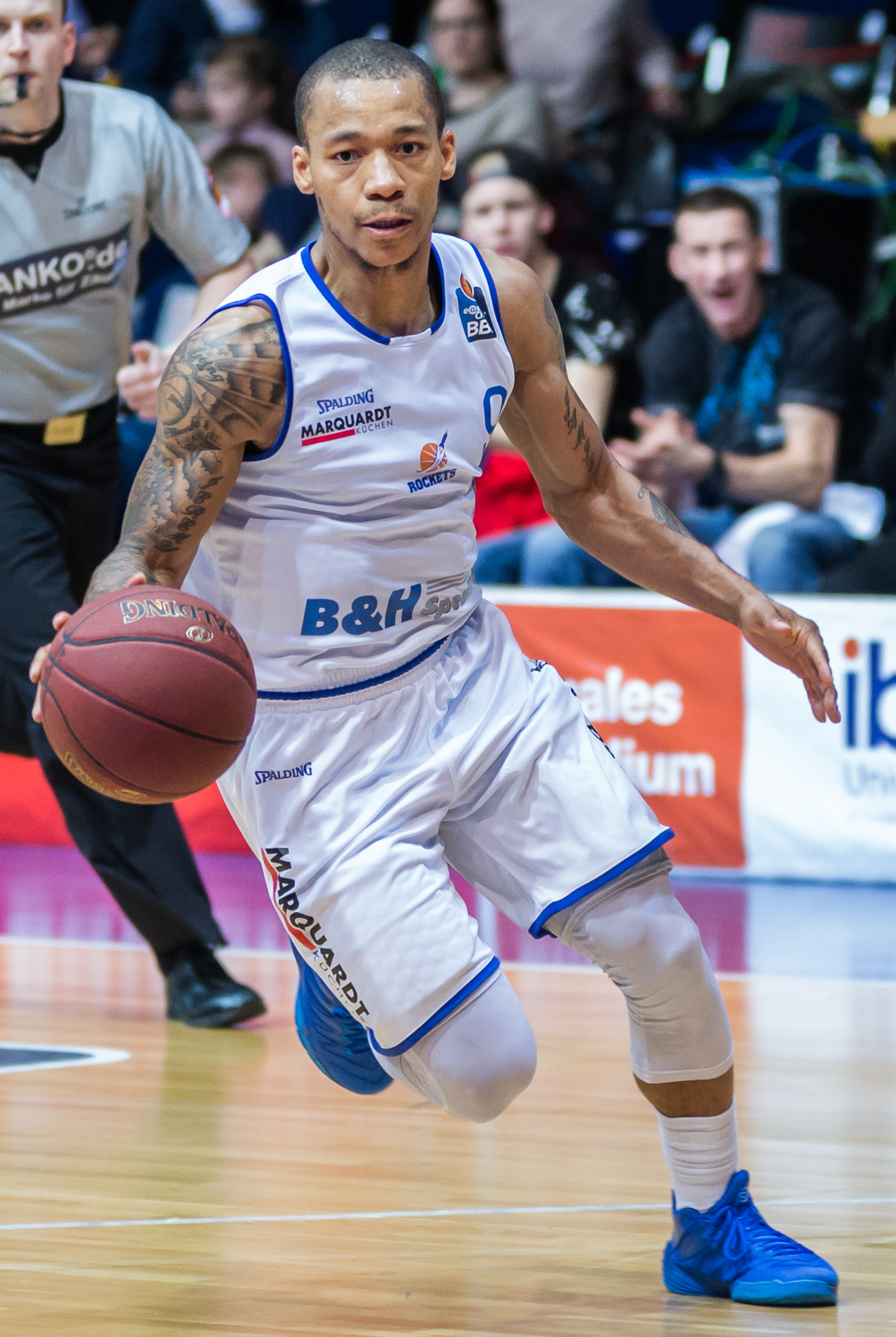
Jerome Randle played for US Monastir in what would be his final professional team

Note: Flags indicate national team eligibility at FIBA-sanctioned events. Players may hold other non-FIBA nationalities not displayed.

US Monastir roster
Players
Coaches

Pos.	No.	Nat.	Name	Ht.	Age
PG	2	(United States)	Randle, Jerome (I)	1.75 m (5 ft 9 in)	37 – 21 May 1987
SG	5	(Tunisia)	Braiek, Omar		21 – 3 March 2004
PF	6	(Senegal)	Thomas, Ibrahima (I)	2.08 m (6 ft 10 in)	38 – 7 February 1987
SF	7	(Tunisia)	Marnaoui, Oussama	1.96 m (6 ft 5 in)	25 – 16 June 1999
SG	10	(Tunisia)	Chouaya, Lassaad	1.90 m (6 ft 3 in)	35 – 22 August 1989
PG	11	(Tunisia)	Mahemli, Houssem	1.90 m (6 ft 3 in)	25 – 14 February 2000
PF	12	(Tunisia)	Addami, Ahmed	2.03 m (6 ft 8 in)	27 – 14 July 1997
SG	12	(Tunisia)	Bouallegue, Amrou	1.92 m (6 ft 4 in)	29 – 24 December 1995
F	15	(Tunisia)	Chennoufi, Ziyed	2.01 m (6 ft 7 in)	36 – 29 November 1988
F	23	(Tunisia)	Lahyani, Firas	2.03 m (6 ft 8 in)	33 – 16 July 1991
C	24	(Tunisia)	Ghyaza, Mokhtar	2.06 m (6 ft 9 in)	38 – 15 November 1986
F/C	41	(Nigeria)	Abass, Churchill (E)	2.03 m (6 ft 8 in)	20 – 21 August 2004
PF	45	(Tunisia)	Slimane, Radhouane (C)	2.04 m (6 ft 8 in)	44 – 16 August 1980

Head coach

- (Serbia) Miodrag Perišić

Assistant coach(es)

- (Tunisia) Zied Kechaou

Legend

- (C) Team captain
- Injured

- Roster
Updated: September 25, 2023
