= 2023 BAL Nile Conference =

Nile Conference of the 2023 Basketball Africa League

The Nile Conference of the 2023 BAL season is played from 26 April to 6 May 2023 and will be played in the Hassan Moustafa Sports Hall in 6th of October, Cairo, Egypt. The four highest-ranked teams advance to the 2023 BAL Playoffs where they will each meet a team from the Nile Conference in the quarter-finals.

== Standings ==
Pos	Team	Pld	W	L	PF	PA	PD	PCT	Qualification	PDL	AAH	CFV	CTT	SLC	COI
1	(Angola) Petro de Luanda	5	5	0	463	363	+100	1.000	Advance to playoffs	—	91–90	—	87–48	—	89–71
2	(Egypt) Al Ahly (H)	5	4	1	425	380	+45	.800	Advance to playoffs	—	—	92–73	—	80–70	—
3	(Mozambique) Ferroviário da Beira	5	2	3	416	462	−46	.400 (Note: Head-to-head: Ferroviário da Beira defeated Cape Town Tigers 82–76 on 3 May 2023.)	Advance to playoffs	76–101	—	—	82–76	—	—
4	(South Africa) Cape Town Tigers	5	2	3	354	398	−44	.400	Advance to playoffs	—	75–91	—	—	—	80–70
5	(Guinea) SLAC	5	1	4	409	427	−18	.200 (Note: Head-to-head: SLAC defeated City Oilers 96–68 on 2 May 2023.)		78–95	—	97–109	68–75	—	—
6	(Uganda) City Oilers	5	1	4	375	412	−37	.200		—	70–72	96–75	—	68–96	—

Source: BAL, Flashscore
(H) Hosts

== Games ==
=== 26 April ===
Al Ahly won their inaugural game in the BAL behind debutant Nuni Omot who scored 21 points for his team.

26 April 2023
18:00

BAL Report
RealGM Report

Al Ahly (Egypt)	92–73	(Mozambique) Ferroviário da Beira
Scoring by quarter: 32–15, 21–19, 23–24, 16–16
Pts: Omot 21; Rebs: Oraby 6 Asts: Webster 9		Pts: Perry 19; Rebs: Three players 7 Asts: Perry 5

Hassan Moustafa Sports Hall, 6th of October
Attendance: 1,159

=== 27 April ===
27 April 2023
17:00

RealGM Report

SLAC (Guinea)	68–75	(South Africa) Cape Town Tigers
Scoring by quarter: 22–16, 17–18, 8–13, 21–23
Pts: Miller Jr. 20; Rebs: Conde, Miller Jr. 12; Asts: Barefield, Nwabuzor 3		Pts: Ganapamo, Hall 15; Rebs: Hall 8 Asts: Wade 5

Hassan Moustafa Sports Hall, 6th of October
Attendance: 270

27 April 2023
20:30

RealGM Report

Petro de Luanda (Angola)	89–71	(Uganda) City Oilers
Scoring by quarter: 21–14, 21–25, 24–20, 23–12
Pts: Gakou 16; Rebs: Hollis 10; Asts: Majok 5		Pts: Jones 22; Rebs: Justice Jr., Roebuck Jr. 8 Asts: Justice Jr. 5

Hassan Moustafa Sports Hall, 6th of October
Attendance: 657

=== 29 April ===
Petro de Luanda defeated Ferroviário by a wide margin, with twelve of Petro's players scoring at least three points.

In the second game of the day, Al Ahly led by as many as 33 points in the third quarter before a late rally by the City Oilers. The Oilers managed to cut the lead to 2 points with 2.6 seconds remaining in the game.

29 April 2023
16:00

Livestats

Ferroviário da Beira (Mozambique)	76–101	(Angola) Petro de Luanda
Scoring by quarter: 11–21, 28–26, 17–31, 20–23
Pts: Young 17; Rebs: Gueye 6 Asts: Perry 6		Pts: Morais 18; Rebs: Hollis 6 Asts: Gonçalves 5

Hassan Moustafa Sports Hall, 6th of October
Attendance: N/A
Referees: Ian McClenny, Wael Ibrahim Mostafa, Aya Ahmed

29 April 2023
19:30

Livestats

City Oilers (Uganda)	70–72	(Egypt) Al Ahly
Scoring by quarter: 14–20, 13–20, 9–21, 34–11
Pts: Roebuck Jr. 28; Rebs: Roebuck Jr. 11; Asts: Enabu 4		Pts: Omot 17; Rebs: Oraby 10; Asts: Tarek 5

Hassan Moustafa Sports Hall, 6th of October
Attendance: 1,372
Referees: Catherine Chang, Kingsley Ojeaburu, Walelign Fikadu Gebeto

=== 30 April ===
Ferroviário da Beira had a lead of as much as 22 points before losing their advantage and trailing 95–92 in the fourth quarter. Point guard Will Perry of Beira scored 41 points, tying the league's single-game scoring record and setting a new record for most three-point field goals in a game with 9 three pointers. Four of Perry's three point field goals came in the fourth quarter, and gave Beira the advantage to improve their record to 1–2 and stay in the race for a playoff spot.

30 April 2023
17:00

Livestats

SLAC (Guinea)	97–109	(Mozambique) Ferroviário da Beira
Scoring by quarter: 16–30, 20–26, 33–20, 28–33
Pts: Miller Jr. 30; Rebs: Miller Jr. 8 Asts: Iroegbu 5		Pts: Perry 41; Rebs: Gueye 8 Asts: Perry 8

Hassan Moustafa Sports Hall, 6th of October
Attendance: 540
Referees: Annie Joyce Muchenu

In their second meeting in two seasons, Petro de Luanda blew out the Cape Town Tigers by as much as 39 points. Five players scored in double digits for Petro, while Josh Hall led Cape Town in scoring with 14 points.

30 April 2023
20:30

Livestats

Petro de Luanda (Angola)	87–48	(South Africa) Cape Town Tigers
Scoring by quarter: 28–12, 20–12, 26–9, 13–15
Pts: Gonçalves 15; Rebs: Gonçalves 9 Asts: Four players 4		Pts: Hall 14; Rebs: Gbinije 8 Asts: Hall, Wade 3

Hassan Moustafa Sports Hall, 6th of October
Attendance: 883
Referees: Tyler Ricks, Mbaye Seye, Jean Sauveur Ruhamiriza

=== 2 May ===
2 May 2023
17:00

BAL Report

City Oilers (Uganda)	68–96	(Guinea) SLAC
Scoring by quarter: 13–24, 12–20, 24–33, 19–19
Pts: Justice Jr. 30; Rebs: Barnaba 9 Asts: Roebuck Jr. 4		Pts: Iroegbu 22; Rebs: Conde 9 Asts: Miller Jr. 10

Hassan Moustafa Sports Hall, 6th of October
Attendance: N/A
Referees: Catherine Chang, Wael Ibrahim Mostafa, Mbaye Seye

2 May 2023
20:30

BAL Report

Cape Town Tigers (South Africa)	75–91	(Egypt) Al Ahly
Scoring by quarter: 20–30, 22–16, 14–18, 19–17
Pts: Ganapamo 26; Rebs: Cele 6 Asts: Ganapamo, Gbinije 5		Pts: Omot 28; Rebs: Omot 5 Asts: Amin 8

Hassan Moustafa Sports Hall, 6th of October
Attendance: 2,050
Referees: Ian McClenny, Jean Sauveur Ruhamiriza, Hassan Kamate

=== 3 May ===
Petro de Luanda became the first club from the Nile Conference to qualify for the 2023 BAL Playoffs, as their bench outscored SLAC's bench 44–2.

3 May 2023
17:00

BAL Report

SLAC (Guinea)	78–95	(Angola) Petro de Luanda
Scoring by quarter: 20–22, 21–34, 17–23, 20–16
Pts: Miller Jr. 24; Rebs: Conde 12; Asts: Miller Jr. 7		Pts: Majok 15; Rebs: Hollis 10; Asts: Diabate 7

Hassan Moustafa Sports Hall, 6th of October
Attendance: 500
Referees: Tyler Mirkovich, Marie Cherubin, Walelign Gebeto

3 May 2023
20:30

BAL Report

Ferroviário da Beira (Mozambique)	82–76	(South Africa) Cape Town Tigers
Scoring by quarter: 23–22, 16–17, 17–26, 26–11
Pts: Young 26; Rebs: Sidibe 17; Asts: Perry 9		Pts: Gbinije 20; Rebs: Gbinije 7 Asts: Gbinije 6

Hassan Moustafa Sports Hall, 6th of October
Attendance: 672
Referees: Julian Scott, Mahamadou Diallo, Aya Ahmed

=== 5 May ===
In the match-up between Petro de Luanda and Al-Ahly, the Angolan champions won the game on a buzzer-beating tip-in by Gerson Gonçalves. Carlos Morais hit eight three-pointers, just one shy of the league record.

5 May 2023
16:00

BAL Report

City Oilers (Uganda)	96–75	(Mozambique) Ferroviário da Beira
Scoring by quarter: 23–16, 27–21, 24–15, 22–23
Pts: Justice Jr. 25; Rebs: Roebuck Jr. 9 Asts: Justice Jr. 6		Pts: Young 29; Rebs: Perry, Young 8 Asts: Perry 4

Hassan Moustafa Sports Hall, 6th of October
Attendance: 1,012
Referees: Ian McClenny, Walelign Gebeto, Mahamadou Diallo

5 May 2023
19:30

BAL Report

Petro de Luanda (Angola)	91–90	(Egypt) Al Ahly
Scoring by quarter: 26–18, 21–25, 24–26, 20–21
Pts: Morais 34; Rebs: Morais 6 Asts: Majok 5		Pts: Omot 25; Rebs: Ismail 7 Asts: Webster 8

Hassan Moustafa Sports Hall, 6th of October
Attendance: 3,015
Referees: Tyler Ricks, Mbaye Seye, Annie Joyce Muchenu

=== 6 May ===
The Cape Town Tigers qualified for their second straight playoffs following their win against the City Oilers. Before the last game of the Nile Conference, SLAC was already eliminated because of the result earlier that day.

6 May 2023
16:00

Livestats

Cape Town Tigers (South Africa)	80–70	(Uganda) City Oilers
Scoring by quarter: 20–17, 17–20, 26–19, 17–14
Pts: Cele 28; Rebs: Gbinije, Cele 8 Asts: Prinsloo 6		Pts: Jones 27; Rebs: Jones, Justice Jr. 8 Asts: Dribela, Justice Jr. 4

Hassan Moustafa Sports Hall, 6th of October
Attendance: 696
Referees: Tyler Mirkovich, Wael Ibrahim Mostafa, Hassan Kamate

6 May 2023
19:30

Livestats

Al Ahly (Egypt)	80–70	(Guinea) SLAC
Scoring by quarter: 19–18, 19–25, 31–8, 11–19
Pts: Oraby 20; Rebs: Ismail 9 Asts: Thompson 6		Pts: Nwabuzor 19; Rebs: Conde 7 Asts: Nwabuzor 4

Hassan Moustafa Sports Hall, 6th of October
Attendance: 1,623
Referees: Catherine Chang, Kingsley Ojeaburu, Marie Leslie Cherubin
