= Baba Jubril =

Nigerian basketball player and coach (born 1990)

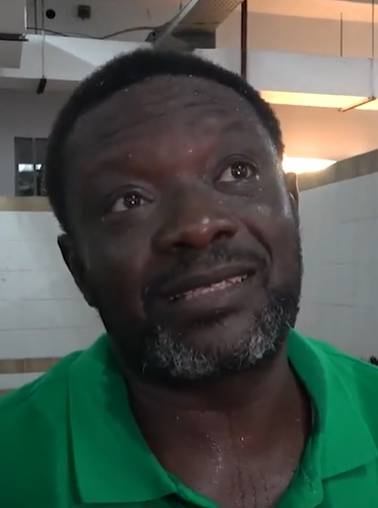
- Jubril in 2023

Kwara Falcons
- Position: Head coach
- League: Nigerian Premier League

Personal information
- Born: 18 January 1990 (age 36) Ilorin, Kwara, Nigeria

Career information
- Coaching career: 2018–present

Career history

Playing
- Nigeria Customs
- Kwara Falcons

Coaching
- 2018–2019: Kwara Falcons (assistant)
- 2019–present: Kwara Falcons
- 2023–present: Nigeria (assistant)

Career highlights
- As head coach: Nigerian Premier League champion (2022)

Kadri Baba Jubril (born 18 January 1990) is a Nigerian professional basketball coach and former player. He is the current head coach of the Kwara Falcons of the Nigerian Premier League (NPL).

== Playing career ==
Jubril competed with the Nigeria Under-19 team at the 1999 FIBA Under-19 World Championship, where he averaged 15 points and 2.9 rebounds per game. During his professional career, he played for the Kwara Falcons (where he was the captain), the Ebun Comets and the Nigeria Customs, among others.

== Coaching career ==
Since 2023, Jubril has also been an assistant coach for the Nigeria national men's team. In 2018, Jubril started as an assistant coach with the Kwara Falcons, under Lateef Erinfolami. Since assuming the position a year later, Jubril has been the head coach of the Kwara Falcons. He guided the team to their first-ever Premier League title in 2022. As a result, he coached the Falcons in their debut season in Season 3 of the Basketball Africa League (BAL). The Falcons went winless in the Sahara Conference, finishing in sixth place with a 0–5 record.

== Head coaching record ==
=== BAL ===
Legend
Regular season	G	Games coached	W	Games won	L	Games lost	W–L %	Win–loss %
Playoffs	PG	Playoff games	PW	Playoff wins	PL	Playoff losses	PW–L %	Playoff win–loss %

Team	Year	G	W	L	W–L%	Finish	PG	PW	PL	PW–L%	Result
Kwara Falcons	2023	5	0	5	.000	5th in Sahara Conference	Did Not Qualify				
