= 2023 BAL Sahara Conference =

Basketball competition in Dakar, Senegal

The Sahara Conference of the 2023 BAL season was played from 11 March to 21 March 2023 and was hosted in the Dakar Arena in Dakar, Senegal for a second straight season in a row. In a group of six teams, all team played each other one time. The top four teams in the standings advanced to the 2023 BAL Playoffs.

REG were the defending Sahara Conference champions, having won the 2022 Conference. The defending champions US Monastir, who won the 2022 BAL Finals, were unable to qualify for the playoffs. Five teams finished with a 3–2 record, which meant head-to-head point difference decided the ranking. Stade Malien ended up as Conference winners.

== Standings ==
Pos	Team	Pld	W	L	PF	PA	PD	PCT	Qualification	SML	ASD	REG	ABC	USM	KWA
1	(Mali) Stade Malien	5	3	2	378	361	+17	.600 (Note: Five tied teams were ranked on point differential in the games against each other: 1) Stade Malien +13; 2) AS Douanes +12; 3) REG –4; 4) ABC Fighters –4; 5) US Monastir –18.)	Advance to playoffs	—	—	84–64	—	68–78	—
2	(Senegal) AS Douanes (H)	5	3	2	350	331	+19	.600	Advance to playoffs	74–58	—	—	70–76	—	—
3	(Rwanda) REG	5	3	2	356	344	+12	.600	Advance to playoffs	—	69–55	—	—	79–84	64–48
4	(Ivory Coast) ABC Fighters	5	3	2	389	390	−1	.600	Advance to playoffs	71–90	—	73–80	—	90–74	—
5	(Tunisia) US Monastir	5	3	2	381	388	−7	.600		—	60–76	—	—	—	85–74
6	(Nigeria) Kwara Falcons	5	0	5	341	381	−40	.000		74–78	68–75	—	76–79	—	—

Source: BAL, Flashscore
(H) Hosts

== Games ==
=== 11 March ===
ABC Fighters won the opening day match-up with hosts AS Douanes, behind Abdoulaye Harouna who made his team debut with 25 points. It was the second consecutive year that a Senegalese club lost the home opener in Dakar, after DUC lost in the 2022 season opener.

11 March 2023
16:00

Boxscore

AS Douanes (Senegal)	70–76	(Ivory Coast) ABC Fighters
Scoring by quarter: 14–25, 17–18, 17–15, 22–18
Pts: Stoglin 21; Rebs: Maluach 9 Asts: Crawford, Ndour 4		Pts: Harouna 25; Rebs: Obekpa 9 Asts: Obekpa, Robinson 5

Dakar Arena, Dakar
Attendance: 9,873
Referees: Charles Watson, Antonio Bernardo, Kalume Tonton Banza

=== 12 March ===
US Monastir opened their 2023 season with a win, while they gave up 21 turnovers against Stade Malien. Souleymane Berthe, the 22-year old starting forward of Stade Malien, scored 34 points in his BAL debut.

12 March 2023
14:00

Boxscore

REG (Rwanda)	64–48	(Nigeria) Kwara Falcons
Scoring by quarter: 16–9, 15–20, 24–8, 9–11
Pts: Graham 16; Rebs: Graham, Kambuy Manga 12; Asts: Filer 8		Pts: Adekoya 15; Rebs: Monyyong 7 Asts: Monyyong 4

Dakar Arena, Dakar
Attendance: 214
Referees: Kevin Fahy, Arnold Moseya, Claudio Eiuba

12 March 2023
17:30

Boxscore

Stade Malien (Mali)	68–78	(Tunisia) US Monastir
Scoring by quarter: 15–23, 22–21, 12–16, 19–18
Pts: Berthe 34; Rebs: Diarra 14; Asts: Keita 3		Pts: Randle 18; Rebs: Thomas 10; Asts: Randle 7

Dakar Arena, Dakar
Attendance: 883
Referees: Nate Cearley, Yann Vezo Davidson, Erick Otieno

=== 14 March ===
Stade Malien won their first-ever BAL game behind Aliou Diarra, who had 23 points, 14 rebounds and 5 blocks against the Falcons. Kwara Falcons' 17-year old Modou Fall Thiam impressed by scoring 11 points off the bench.

14 March 2023
16:00

Kwara Falcons (Nigeria)	74–78	(Mali) Stade Malien
Scoring by quarter: 15–18, 16–18, 18–28, 25–14
Pts: Wilson 19; Rebs: Mohammed 8 Asts: Mordi 5		Pts: Diarra 23; Rebs: Diarra 14; Asts: Three players 3

Dakar Arena, Dakar
Attendance: 300
Referees: Biniam Maru, Kalume Tonton Banza, Dorothy Okatch

The Rwandan champions REG had no trouble with AS Douanes and was reported by the BAL to be the first team to clinch their spot in the 2023 BAL Playoffs; however this turned out to be incorrect.

14 March 2023
19:30

ABC Fighters (Ivory Coast)	73–80	(Rwanda) REG
Scoring by quarter: 20–17, 24–20, 19–26, 11–17
Pts: Konaté 16; Rebs: Obekpa 11; Asts: Konaté 6		Pts: Filer 25; Rebs: Graham 10; Asts: Thomas 6

Dakar Arena, Dakar
Attendance: 300
Referees: Stephanie Barksdale, Aboolo Amr, Erick Otieno

=== 15 March ===
15 March 2023
16:00

Livestats

US Monastir (Tunisia)	85–74	(Nigeria) Kwara Falcons
Scoring by quarter: 20–17, 23–20, 23–18, 28–20
Pts: Thomas 22; Rebs: Lahyani 10; Asts: Randle 8		Pts: Ezeh 22; Rebs: Monyyong 9 Asts: Mordi 6

Dakar Arena, Dakar
Attendance: 372

15 March 2023
19:30

Boxscore

REG (Rwanda)	69–55	(Senegal) AS Douanes
Scoring by quarter: 25–12, 17–12, 15–12, 12–19
Pts: Nshobozwabyosenumukiza 14; Rebs: Nshobozwabyosenumukiza 10; Asts: Thomas 6		Pts: Crawford 17; Rebs: Crawford 9 Asts: Stoglin 5

Dakar Arena, Dakar
Attendance: 4,010
Referees: Kevin Fahy, Sara Elsharnouby, Claudio Eiuba

=== 17 March ===
ABC Fighters stunned the favoured defending champions Monastir, behind a game-high 33 points from Abdoulaye Harouna. They ended Monastir's 5-game winning streak lasting from March 2022.

17 March 2023
16:00

Boxscore

ABC Fighters (Ivory Coast)	90–74	(Tunisia) US Monastir
Scoring by quarter: 21–27, 20–9, 17–18, 32–20
Pts: Harouna 33; Rebs: Obepka 9 Asts: Harouna, Fofana 3		Pts: Randle 25; Rebs: Thomas 10; Asts: Randle 5

Dakar Arena, Dakar
Attendance: 800
Referees: Nate Cearley, Sara Elsharnouby, Arnold Moseya

After Stade Malien led 17–16 in the first quarter, AS Douanes never trailed and led by as many as 20 points (66–46) in the fourth quarter. Chris Crawford led Douanes with a game-high 21 points. The league's all-time leading scorer, Terrell Stoglin, did not play.

17 March 2023
19:30

Boxscore

AS Douanes (Senegal)	74–58	(Mali) Stade Malien
Scoring by quarter: 21–17, 12–12, 14–13, 27–16
Pts: Crawford 21; Rebs: Ndiaye 8 Asts: Ndour 5		Pts: Berthe 17; Rebs: Diarra 14; Asts: Mamadou Keita 4

Dakar Arena, Dakar
Attendance: 3,059

=== 18 March ===
18 March 2023
14:00

Boxscore

Stade Malien (Mali)	84–64	(Rwanda) REG
Scoring by quarter: 22–12, 15–20, 23–17, 24–15
Pts: Berthe 23; Rebs: Diarra 16; Asts: Amayo 6		Pts: Filer 19; Rebs: Chomche 9 Asts: Thomas 10

Dakar Arena, Dakar
Attendance: 650
Referees: Biniam Maru, Aboolo Amr, Dorothy Okatch

18 March 2023
17:30

Boxscore

Kwara Falcons (Nigeria)	68–75	(Senegal) AS Douanes
Scoring by quarter: 17–20, 18–21, 12–16, 21–16
Pts: Ezeh 12; Rebs: Mordi 7 Asts: Mordi 4		Pts: Boissy 22; Rebs: Diagne 6 Asts: Crawford 6

Dakar Arena, Dakar
Attendance: 6,571
Referees: Kevin Fahy, Sara Elsharnouby, Didier Gaga

=== 20 March ===
The game was a re-match of the 2022 Sahara Conference, when REG beat Monastir and won the conference. Monastir led by as much as 21 points in the third quarter, before a come back by REG cut the lead to just five points with two minutes left on the clock. After three turnovers, Monastir won the game and qualified for the playoffs. Cleveland Thomas of REG scored 38 points, after shooting 13-for-21 from the field, the second most in BAL history.

Kwara Falcons, already eliminated, was competitive against the ABC Fighters. The Fighters won the game after back-to-back three pointers by their South Sudanese guard Chudier Bile. As a result, they were the second team to successfully qualify for the playoffs.

20 March 2023
16:00

Livestats

Kwara Falcons (Nigeria)	76–79	(Ivory Coast) ABC Fighters
Scoring by quarter: 19–23, 14–18, 21–20, 22–18
Pts: Wilson Jr. 15; Rebs: Mordi 14; Asts: Mordi 6		Pts: Bile 24; Rebs: Obekpa 7 Asts: Robinson 5

Dakar Arena, Dakar
Attendance: 472
Referees: Biniam Maru, Yann Vezo Davidson, Erick Otieno

20 March 2023
19:30

Livestats

REG (Rwanda)	79–84	(Tunisia) US Monastir
Scoring by quarter: 10–25, 20–13, 16–25, 33–21
Pts: Thomas 38; Rebs: Graham, Ndizeye 7 Asts: Thomas 4		Pts: Randle 32; Rebs: Thomas 7 Asts: Five players 3

Dakar Arena, Dakar
Attendance: 600
Referees: Nate Cearley, Kalume Tonton Banza, Erick Otieno

=== 21 March ===
Stade Malien, still unqualified at the time, dominated ABC Fighters as they led by as much as 27 points late in the fourth quarter (84–57). Aliou Diarra recorded his fifth double-double in five games, with 22 points and 10 rebounds.

Ahead of the final game of the Sahara Conference, US Monastir was on top of the table with a 3–1 record. However, hosts AS Douanes convincingly defeated Monastir behind Chris Crawford's 28 points (of which 22 points were scored in the first quarter); this led to a tie between five teams. Because of the wide margin of victory, US Monastir finished with the lowest point difference in matches against the tied teams and was eliminated, the first reigning BAL champion to miss the playoffs. The victory also meant that Douanes would finish second, and Stade Malien, in fourth position in the beginning of the day, finished as Conference winners.

21 March 2023
16:00

Livestats

ABC Fighters (Ivory Coast)	71–90	(Mali) Stade Malien
Scoring by quarter: 10–18, 18–25, 13–22, 30–25
Pts: Konaté 19; Rebs: Robinson, Konaté 8 Asts: Robinson 8		Pts: Diarra 22; Rebs: Chinyelu 13; Asts: Berthé 7

Dakar Arena, Dakar
Attendance: 1,567
Referees: Stephanie Barksdale, Antonio Bernardo, Arnold Moseya

21 March 2023
19:30

Livestats

US Monastir (Tunisia)	60–76	(Senegal) AS Douanes
Scoring by quarter: 10–22, 22–10, 12–14, 16–20
Pts: Lahyani 15; Rebs: Slimane 9 Asts: Bouallegue, Slimane 3		Pts: Crawford 28; Rebs: Boissy, Ochereobia 7 Asts: Ndour 5

Dakar Arena, Dakar
Attendance: 6,761
Referees: Charles Watson, Aboolo Amr, Didier Gaga
