= 2023 BAL season =

3rd season of the Basketball Africa League

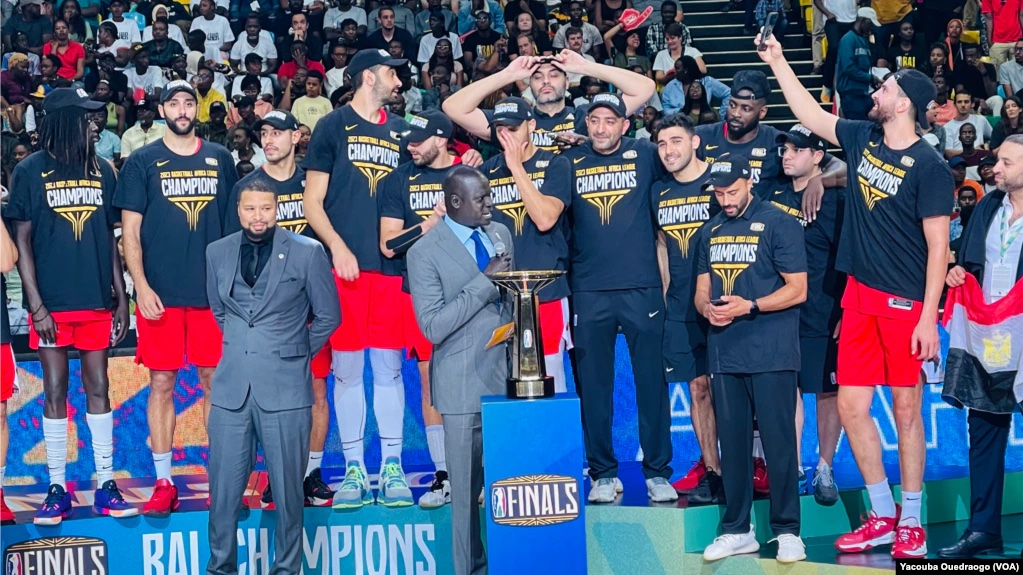
- Al Ahly receiving the trophy after winning the final
- League: Basketball Africa League
- Season: 2023
- Dates: 11 March – 27 May 2023
- Games played: 38
- Teams: 12

Season
- Season MVP: Nuni Omot (Al Ahly)

Finals
- Champions: (Egypt) Al Ahly (1st title)
- Runners-up: (Senegal) AS Douanes
- Third place: (Mali) Stade Malien
- Fourth place: (Angola) Petro de Luanda

Records
- Biggest home win: 41 points Petro de Landa 87–48 Cape Town Tigers (30 April 2023)
- Highest attendance: 9,874; AS Douanes 70–76 ABC Fighters (11 March 2023)
- Lowest attendance: 214; REG 64–48 Kwara Falcons (12 March 2023)

Seasons
- ← 2022 (Season 2) 2024 (Season 4) →

The 2023 BAL season, also known as BAL Season 3, was the third season of the Basketball Africa League (BAL). The season began on 11 March 2023 and ended on 27 May 2023. The playoffs were played in the BK Arena in Kigali, which hosted the final stage for a third season in a row. The regular season was played in Dakar, Senegal and Cairo, Egypt, both venues hosted a conference for a second year in a row.

Al Ahly defeated AS Douanes in the final, which was played in the BK Arena in Kigali, for a first-ever BAL title. As the winners, Al Ahly automatically qualified for the 2023 FIBA Intercontinental Cup Singapore.

US Monastir were the defending champions, having won their first title in the previous edition, but were eliminated in the Sahara Conference.

== Qualification ==
The first round of the qualifying stage consists of 20 teams that play in four groups of five, each held in different cities. In the Elite 16, the teams are joined by 6 teams that qualified during the previous 2022 BAL qualification. Two groups of five teams are played to determine the six teams that advance to the main tournament.

On 21 September 2021, FIBA Africa announced the 26 teams in the qualifying tournaments as well as the six countries that would qualify directly.

=== East Division ===
==== Group phase ====
Group A
(Niamey)

Pos	Team	Pld	Pts
1	(Ivory Coast) ABC Fighters	3	6
2	(Mali) Stade Malien	3	5
3	(Benin) Elan Coton (W)	3	4
4	(Niger) Nigelec (H)	3	3

Source: Road to BAL
(H) Hosts; (W) Advanced with wild card
Group B
(Yaoundé)

Pos	Team	Pld	Pts
1	(Central African Republic) Bangui Sporting Club	2	4
2	(Equatorial Guinea) Nueva Era	2	3
3	(Gabon) Espoir	2	2

Source: Road to BAL

==== Elite 16 ====
Group A
(Abidjan)

Pos	Team	Pld	Pts
1	(Central African Republic) Bangui Sporting Club	3	6
2	(Ivory Coast) ABC Fighters	3	4
3	(Morocco) AS Salé	3	4
4	(Benin) Elan Coton	3	4

Source: Road to BAL
Group B
(Abidjan)

Pos	Team	Pld	Pts
1	(Mali) Stade Malien	3	6
2	(Guinea) SLAC	3	5
3	(Cameroon) FAP	3	4
4	(Equatorial Guinea) Nueva Era	3	3

Source: Road to BAL

==== Final round ====
Semi-finals
18 November 2022
(Central African Republic) Bangui Sporting Club	61
(Guinea) SLAC	69
18 November 2022
(Mali) Stade Malien	59
(Ivory Coast) ABC Fighters	62

Final
19 November 2022
(Guinea) SLAC	70
(Ivory Coast) ABC Fighters	81
Third place game
19 November 2022
(Central African Republic) Bangui Sporting Club	59
(Mali) Stade Malien	62

=== East Division ===
==== Group phase ====
Group A
(Dar es Salaam)

Pos	Team	Pld	Pts
1	(Burundi) Urunani	3	6
2	(Uganda) City Oilers	3	5
3	(Tanzania) ABC (H)	3	4
4	(Zambia) Matero Magic (W)	3	3

Source: Road to BAL
(H) Hosts; (W) Advanced with wild card
Group B
(Antananarivo)

Pos	Team	Pld	Pts
1	(Madagascar) COSPN (H)	2	4
2	(Kenya) KPA	2	3
3	(Comoros) Djabal Iconi	2	2

Source: Road to BAL
(H) Hosts

==== Elite 16 ====
Group C
(Johannesburg)

Pos	Team	Pld	Pts
1	(Burundi) Urunani	3	5
2	(South Africa) Cape Town Tigers	3	5
3	NBA Academy Africa	3	5
4	(Kenya) KPA	3	3

Source: Road to BAL
Group D
(Johannesburg)

Pos	Team	Pld	Pts
1	(Uganda) City Oilers	3	6
2	(Mozambique) Ferroviário da Beira	3	5
3	(Zambia) Matero Magic	3	4
4	(Madagascar) COSPN	3	3

Source: Road to BAL

==== Final round ====
Semi-finals
26 November
(Burundi) Urunani	62
(Mozambique) Ferroviário da Beira	68
26 November
(Uganda) City Oilers	69
(South Africa) Cape Town Tigers	75

Final
27 November
(Mozambique) Ferroviário da Beira	71
(South Africa) Cape Town Tigers	81
Third place game
27 November
(Burundi) Urunani	62
(Uganda) City Oilers	71

== Teams ==
Petro de Luanda was the first team to qualify for the season when it won the Angolan League on 10 May 2022. The last qualified team was City Oilers who captured the third place in the Road to BAL East Division on 27 November 2022. The twelve teams of the 2023 BAL season were officially confirmed on 13 February 2023. After an absence of a Nigerian representative in the 2022 season due to FIBA's punishment of the Nigeria Basketball Federation, Kwara Falcons was directly qualified as winners of the Nigerian Premier League.

Al Ahly, Kwara Falcons, ABC Fighters and Stade Malien made their league debuts. ABC Fighters was the first team from Ivory Coast to play in the BAL, while City Oilers was the first team from Uganda.

Two teams, defending champions US Monastir and runners-up Petro de Luanda, appear in their third consecutive season.

Team	Method of qualification	Date of qualification	Finals appearance	Previous appearance	Consecutive appearances	Previous best performance
(Angola) Petro de Luanda	Angolan Basketball League winners	10 May 2022	3rd	2022	3	Runners-up (2022)
(Tunisia) US Monastir	Championnat National A winners	16 May 2022	3rd	2022	3	Champions (2022)
(Egypt) Al Ahly	Egyptian Super League winners	16 May 2022	1st	–	1	–
(Rwanda) REG	RBL winners	19 September 2022	2nd	2022	2	Quarter-finals (2022)
(Senegal) AS Douanes	Nationale 1 winners	15 October 2022	2nd	2021	1	Quarter-finals (2021)
(Nigeria) Kwara Falcons	NBBF Premier League winners	12 November 2022	1st	–	1	–
(Ivory Coast) ABC Fighters	Road to BAL West Division winners	17 November 2022	1st	–	1	–
(Guinea) SLAC	Road to BAL West Division runners-up	17 November 2022	2nd	2022	2	Quarter-finals (2022)
(Mali) Stade Malien	Road to BAL West Division third place	18 November 2022	1st	–	1	–
(Mozambique) Ferroviário da Beira	Road to BAL East Division runners-up	26 November 2022	2nd	2022	2	Group stage (2022)
(South Africa) Cape Town Tigers	Road to BAL East Division winners	26 November 2022	2nd	2022	2	Quarter-finals (2022)
(Uganda) City Oilers	Road to BAL East Division third place	27 November 2022	1st	–	1	–

=== Personnel ===
Augustí Julbe of Al Ahly was the only coach this season to already have won a BAL championship, as he won the 2021 title with Zamalek.

Team	Head coach	Captain
ABC Fighters	(Australia) Liz Mills	(Ivory Coast) Stéphane Konaté
Al Ahly	(Spain) Augustí Julbe	(Egypt) Seif Samir
AS Douanes	(Senegal) Pabi Guèye	(Senegal) Alkaly Ndour
Cape Town Tigers	(United States) Rasheed Hazzard	(South Africa) Pieter Prinsloo
City Oilers	(Uganda) Mandy Juruni	(Uganda) James Okello
Ferroviário da Beira	(Spain) Luís Lopes Hernandez	(United States) Will Perry
Kwara Falcons	(Nigeria) Baba Jubril	(Nigeria) Victor Ezeh
Petro de Luanda	(Brazil) José Neto	(Angola) Carlos Morais
REG	(United States) Dean Murray	(Rwanda) Olivier Shyaka
SLAC	(Serbia) Željko Zečević	(Guinea) Ibrahima Kalil Fofana
Stade Malien	(Mali) Kaba Kanté	(Mali) Makan Keita
US Monastir	(Serbia) Miodrag Perišić	(Tunisia) Radhouane Slimane

=== Foreign and Elevate players ===
Each BAL team was allowed to have four foreign players on its roster, including only two non-African players. Players in italics were signed only for the playoffs. If players have multiple nationalities, the nationality of an African nation is shown.

Each team also featured one player from the NBA Academy Africa, under the BAL Elevate program. The players were drafted in an online meeting by the teams and the official list were announced on 28 February 2023.

Team	Players				Elevate player
Team	1	2	3	4	Elevate player
ABC Fighters (Note: The ABC Fighters played the regular season with Chudier Bile (South Sudan), Alex Robinson (United States) and Chris Obekpa (Nigeria) as import players. They switched the three players ahead of the playoffs.)	(Tunisia) Omar Abada	(Kenya) Tylor Ongwae	(Guinea) Ousmane Dramé	(Niger) Abdoulaye Harouna	(Nigeria) Joy Ighovodja
Al Ahly	(South Sudan) Nuni Omot	(Nigeria) Michael Fakuade	(United States) Michael Thompson	(New Zealand) Corey Webster	(Mali) Ladji Camara
AS Douanes	(Ghana) Matthew Bryan-Amaning	(Nigeria) Michael Ochereobia	(United States) Terrell Stoglin	(United States) Chris Crawford	(South Sudan) Khaman Maluach
Cape Town Tigers (Note: The Cape Town Tigers played in the regular season with Josh Hall as an import player, however, Hall was released and replaced with Marvin Smith Jr. ahead of the playoffs.)	(Central African Republic) Evans Ganapamo	(Nigeria) Michael Gbinije	(United States) Zaire Wade	(United States) Marvin Smith Jr.	(Democratic Republic of the Congo) Parby Musongela
City Oilers	(South Sudan) Ngor Barnaba	(United States) Falando Jones	(United States) James Justice Jr.	—N/a	(Nigeria) Obe Ezekiel
Ferroviário da Beira	(Senegal) Makhtar Gueye	(Mali) Bourama Sidibe	(United States) Will Perry	(United States) Najeal Young	(Democratic Republic of the Congo) Paul Kabenga Mbiya
Kwara Falcons	(Sierra Leone) Sita Conteh	(Cameroon) Kevin Nyemeck	(United States) A. J. Wilson	(United States) Ruot Monyyong	(Senegal) Modou Fall Thiam
Petro de Luanda	(Ivory Coast) Solo Diabate	(Hungary) Damian Hollis	(Lebanon) Ater Majok	—N/a	(Egypt) Seifeldin Hendaway
REG	(Democratic Republic of the Congo) Pitchou Kambuy Manga	(Cameroon) Beleck Bell Engelbert	(United States) Cleveland Thomas	(United States) Delwan Graham	(Cameroon) Ulrich Chomche
SLAC	(Nigeria) Michael Nwabuzor	(Nigeria) Uchenna Iroegbu	(United States) Dane Miller Jr.	(Philippines) Sedrick Barefield	(South Sudan) Mabilmawut Mabil
Stade Malien	(Nigeria) Kelvin Amayo	(United States) Gregory Foster	(United States) Brian Bridgeford	(Morocco) John Wilkins	(Nigeria) Rueben Chinyelu
US Monastir	(Senegal) Ibrahima Thomas	(Ukraine) Jerome Randle	—N/a	—N/a	(Nigeria) Churchill Abass

=== Notable transactions ===
- On 23 September 2022, Petro de Luanda signed two-time BAL champion Solo Diabate, who came over from US Monastir.
- On 10 January 2023, AS Douanes announced the signing of two-time BAL scoring champion Terrell Stoglin. They signed Chris Crawford, who played in the two previous BAL seasons, as well to complete their back court.
- On 21 January 2023, US Monastir signed Jerome Randle, a former NBL MVP winner in Australia.
- On 4 February 2023, the Cape Town Tigers signed Zaire Wade. Because Zaire is the son of Hall of Famer Dwyane Wade, the signing gained attention in the United States.
- On 23 February 2023, ABC Fighters announced the signing of Abdoulaye Harouna, who lined up for his third BAL season.
- On 10 March 2023, Petro de Luanda signed Ater Majok, reigning BAL champion and the reigning Defensive Player of the Year. Majok came over from US Monastir.
- In May, ahead of the playoffs, the ABC Fighters signed Omar Abada, who was an All-BAL First Team selection in 2021.

== Pre-season ==
US Monastir, as champions of the 2022 BAL season, participated in the 2023 FIBA Intercontinental Cup. It was the second time a BAL team participated in the FIBA Intercontinental Cup. In the competition, played in February and hosted in La Laguna in Spain, Monastir finished fourth after two losses against CB Canarias and Rio Grande Valley Vipers.

ESPN declared Petro de Luanda, last year's runners-up, as the title favourites in their annual season preview.

=== Combine ===
The league hosted their official second BAL Combine on 15 and 16 January 2023 at The One Ball Training Center in Paris. The combine featured 30 players and was directed by former NBA head coach Quin Snyder. Several players signed a contract with a BAL team after participating in the Combine.

Signed players from the 2023 BAL Combine
Player	Team
Adonis Filer	REG
Chudier Bile	ABC Fighters
Makhtar Gueye	Ferroviário da Beira
Zaire Wade	Cape Town Tigers

== Schedule ==
The schedule for the 2023 season was officially released on 13 February 2023.

Phase	Round	Draw date	Games
Qualifying	First Round	–	12–30 October 2022
Qualifying	Elite 16	3 November 2022	14–27 November 2022
Group phase	Sahara Conference	–	11–21 March 2023
Group phase	Nile Conference	–	26 April – 6 May 2023
Playoffs	Quarter-finals	–	21–27 May 2023
Playoffs	Semi-finals	–	21–27 May 2023
Playoffs	Final and third place	–	21–27 May 2023

== Regular season ==
The regular season is played from 11 March to 6 May 2023. The twelve teams are divided into two conferences of six teams each. Teams in each group play each other one time, whereafter the top four teams advance to the playoffs.

Tiebreakers
The ranking of teams in the regular season is determined as follows:
1. Win-loss record;
2. Head-to-head record;
3. Point differential in the games between the respective teams;
4. Number of points scored in the games between the respective teams;
5. Average point differential in all games against other teams in the Conference;
6. Average number of points scored in all games played against other teams in the Conference;
7. Drawing.

=== Sahara Conference ===
The games of the Sahara Conference were played from 11 March to 21 March 2023 and were hosted in the Dakar Arena in Dakar, Senegal for a second consecutive season. Stade Malien finished as Conference winner, due to their head-to-head point difference that determined the ranking of five teams with a 3–2 record. The defending BAL champions, US Monastir, missed the playoffs after they lost on the last game day.

Pos	Team	Pld	W	L	PF	PA	PD	PCT	Qualification	SML	ASD	REG	ABC	USM	KWA
1	(Mali) Stade Malien	5	3	2	378	361	+17	.600 (Note: Five tied teams were ranked on point differential in the games against each other: 1) Stade Malien +13; 2) AS Douanes +12; 3) REG –4; 4) ABC Fighters –4; 5) US Monastir –18.)	Advance to playoffs	—	—	84–64	—	68–78	—
2	(Senegal) AS Douanes (H)	5	3	2	350	331	+19	.600	Advance to playoffs	74–58	—	—	70–76	—	—
3	(Rwanda) REG	5	3	2	356	344	+12	.600	Advance to playoffs	—	69–55	—	—	79–84	64–48
4	(Ivory Coast) ABC Fighters	5	3	2	389	390	−1	.600	Advance to playoffs	71–90	—	73–80	—	90–74	—
5	(Tunisia) US Monastir	5	3	2	381	388	−7	.600		—	60–76	—	—	—	85–74
6	(Nigeria) Kwara Falcons	5	0	5	341	381	−40	.000		74–78	68–75	—	76–79	—	—

Source: BAL, Flashscore
Legend: Blue = home team win; Red = away team win.
(H) Hosts

=== Nile Conference ===
The games of the Nile Conference will be played from 26 April to 6 May 2023 and will be played in the Hassan Moustafa Sports Hall in 6th of October, Cairo, Egypt.

Petro de Luanda went undefeated and won the conference, after defeating four teams with a margin of at least 17 points. In the most notable match-up of the conference, Petro de Luanda defeated Al Ahly on a buzzer-beater by Gerson Gonçalves.

Pos	Team	Pld	W	L	PF	PA	PD	PCT	Qualification	PDL	AAH	CFV	CTT	SLC	COI
1	(Angola) Petro de Luanda	5	5	0	463	363	+100	1.000	Advance to playoffs	—	91–90	—	87–48	—	89–71
2	(Egypt) Al Ahly (H)	5	4	1	425	380	+45	.800	Advance to playoffs	—	—	92–73	—	80–70	—
3	(Mozambique) Ferroviário da Beira	5	2	3	416	462	−46	.400 (Note: Head-to-head: Ferroviário da Beira defeated Cape Town Tigers 82–76 on 3 May 2023.)	Advance to playoffs	76–101	—	—	82–76	—	—
4	(South Africa) Cape Town Tigers	5	2	3	354	398	−44	.400	Advance to playoffs	—	75–91	—	—	—	80–70
5	(Guinea) SLAC	5	1	4	409	427	−18	.200 (Note: Head-to-head: SLAC defeated City Oilers 96–68 on 2 May 2023.)		78–95	—	97–109	68–75	—	—
6	(Uganda) City Oilers	5	1	4	375	412	−37	.200		—	70–72	96–75	—	68–96	—

Source: BAL, Flashscore
Legend: Blue = home team win; Red = away team win.
(H) Hosts

== Playoffs ==
The playoffs were held from 21 May to 27 May 2023 in the BK Arena in Kigali, Rwanda for the third consecutive season.

=== Bracket ===
Quarterfinals
21 May
(Egypt) Al Ahly	94
(Rwanda) REG	77
21 May
(Mali) Stade Malien	78
(South Africa) Cape Town Tigers	69
22 May
(Angola) Petro de Luanda	88
(Ivory Coast) ABC Fighters	84
22 May
(Senegal) AS Douanes	93
(Mozambique) Ferroviário da Beira	73

Semifinals
25 May
(Egypt) Al Ahly	78
(Mali) Stade Malien	73
25 May
(Angola) Petro de Luanda	86
(Senegal) AS Douanes	92

Final
27 May
(Egypt) Al Ahly	80
(Senegal) AS Douanes	65
Third place game
26 May
(Angola) Petro de Luanda	65
(Mali) Stade Malien	73

== Individual awards ==
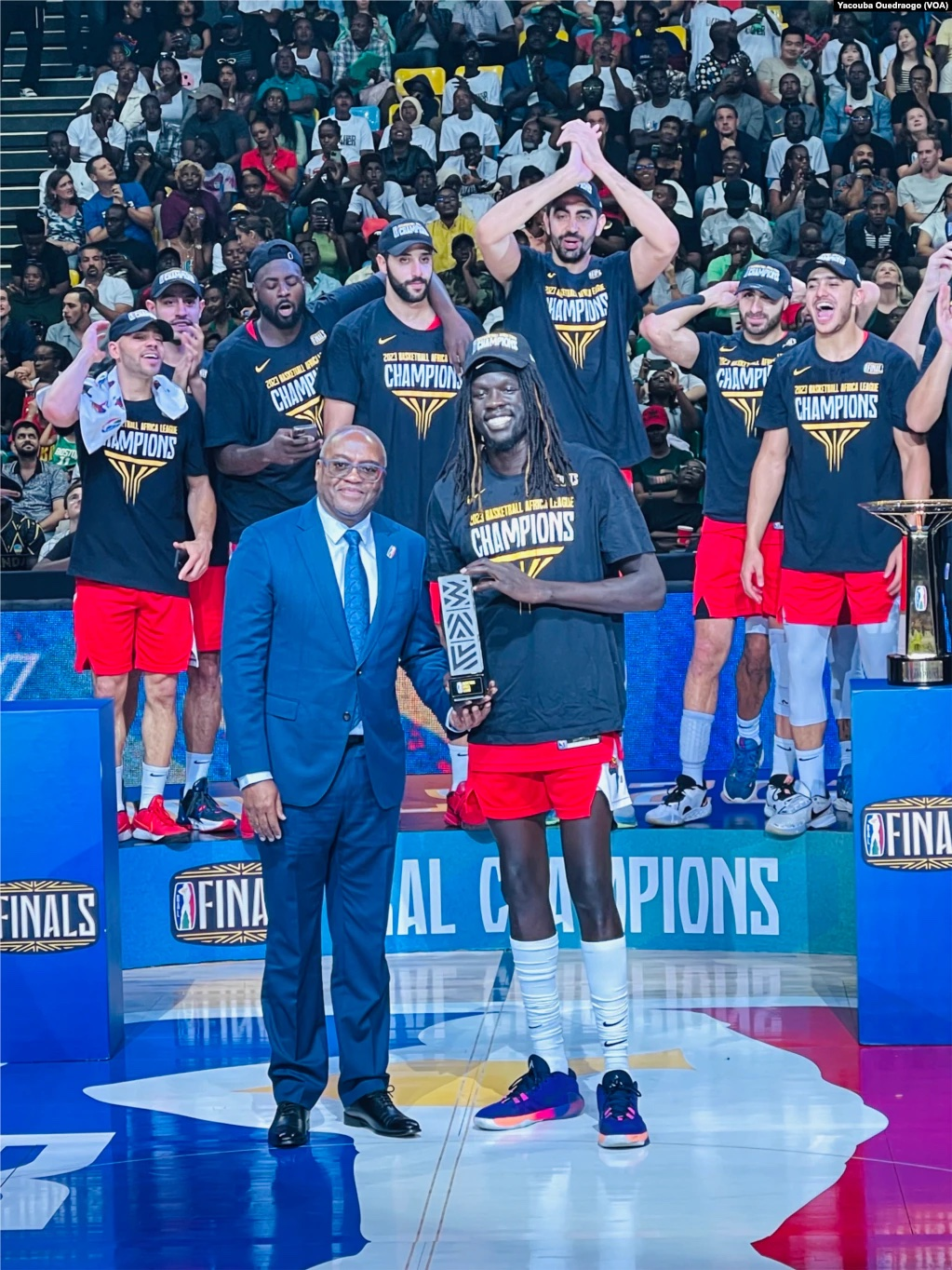
Nuni Omot received the BAL Hakeem Olajuwon Most Valuable Player Award

The winner of the Coach of the Year award was announced on 26 May. The Defensive Player of the Year, Sportsmanship Award and Most Valuable Player were announced on 27 May. The BAL's community service award, the Ubuntu Award, was decided by an online fan vote and the winner was announced on 30 January 2024.

- Most Valuable Player: Nuni Omot, Al Ahly
- Defensive Player of the Year: Aliou Diarra, Stade Malien
- Coach of the Year: Pabi Gueye, AS Douanes
- Sportsmanship Award: Will Perry, Ferroviário da Beira
- Ubuntu Award: Tonny Drileba, City Oilers
- All-BAL First Team
  - G Chris Crawford, AS Douanes
  - G Jean Jacques Boissy, AS Douanes
  - F Dane Miller Jr., SLAC
  - F Nuni Omot, Al Ahly
  - C Aliou Diarra, Stade Malien
- BAL All-Defensive Team
  - G Childe Dundão, Petro de Luanda
  - G Jean Jacques Boissy, AS Douanes
  - F Samkelo Cele, Cape Town Tigers
  - C Aliou Diarra, Stade Malien
  - C Ater Majok, Petro de Luanda

== Statistics ==
=== Individual statistic leaders ===
Category	Player	Team(s)	Statistic
Points per game	Falando Jones	City Oilers	21.6
Rebounds per game	Aliou Diarra	Stade Malien	12.8
Assists per game	Cleveland Thomas	REG	6.7
Steals per game	Dane Miller Jr.	SLAC	3.2
Blocks per game	Aliou Diarra	Stade Malien	2.3
Minutes per game	Dane Miller Jr.	SLAC	39.3
FG%	Dane Miller Jr.	SLAC	55.6%
3P%	Ibrahima Thomas	US Monastir	44.8%
FT%	Will Perry	Ferroviário da Beira	96.7%

=== Individual game highs ===
Category	Player	Team	Statistic
Points	Will Perry	Ferroviário da Beira	41
Rebounds	Aliou Diarra	Stade Malien	16
Assists	Cleveland Thomas	REG	10
Assists	Dane Miller Jr.	SLAC	10
Assists	Will Perry	Ferroviário da Beira	10
Steals	Ulrich Kra	ABC Fighters	6
Blocks	Aliou Diarra	Stade Malien	5
Blocks	Ater Majok	Petro de Luanda	5
Blocks	Mouhamadou Diagne	AS Douanes	5
Three pointers	Will Perry	Ferroviário da Beira	9
