= Jeremiah Mordi =

Nigerian basketball player

No. 4 – Saskatchewan Rattlers
- Position: Point guard
- League: CEBL

Personal information
- Born: 7 January 1993 (age 33) Lagos, Nigeria
- Listed height: 6 ft 4 in (1.93 m)
- Listed weight: 195 lb (88 kg)

Career information
- College: Queens College (2011–2015)
- NBA draft: 2015: undrafted
- Playing career: 2015–present

Career history
- 2017–2019: Saint John Riptide
- 2019–2020: Moncton Magic
- 2020–2021: Caen Basket Calvados
- 2021: Texas Legends
- 2023: Kwara Falcons
- 2023–2024: London Lightning
- 2024–present: Saskatchewan Rattlers

Career highlights
- All-NBL Canada First Team (2020)

Jeremiah Mordi (born 7 January 1993) is a Nigerian professional basketball player for the Saskatchewan Rattlers of the Canadian Elite Basketball League (CEBL). He played college basketball for Queens College.

== Early and personal life ==
Mordi was born in Lagos, the capital of Nigeria. He recalls that basketball has been a part of him since he was a kid. He went to Queens College, City University of New York.

== Professional career ==
During the 2019–20 season, he played for Moncton Magic where he was elected to the All NBL First team. He recorded 16 points, 7.1 rebounds and 5.9 assists on average (23.4 efficiency). He had a 60.3% three-point quota.

In July 2020 he joined Caen Basket Calvados under head coach Fabrice Courcier.

=== Texas Legends (2021) ===
On November 15, 2021, Mordi was waived by the Texas Legends.

=== Kwara Falcons (2023) ===
In February 2023, Mordi joined the Nigerian club Kwara Falcons of the Basketball Africa League (BAL). The Falcons were winless in the Sahara Conference, finishing the tournament 0–5.

=== Saskatchewan Rattlers (2024–present) ===
On 4 July 2024, Mordi signed with the Saskatchewan Rattlers.

== National team career ==
Mordi played for the Nigerian national team at the FIBA AfroBasket 2021 in Rwanda.

== Player profile ==
Jeremiah Mordi can play both guard positions. He is especially known for his three-point shooting. Fabrice Courcier, Mordi's coach at Caen further stated that he hired Mordi because "..he an altruistic player capable of scoring, of making others play and of taking rebounds. He is tall (1.93 m), athletic, versatile. I had very good feedback on his ethos."

== BAL career statistics ==
Legend
GP	Games played	GS	Games started	MPG	Minutes per game
FG%	Field goal percentage	3P%	3-point field goal percentage	FT%	Free throw percentage
RPG	Rebounds per game	APG	Assists per game	SPG	Steals per game
BPG	Blocks per game	PPG	Points per game	**Bold**	Career high

Year	Team	GP	GS	MPG	FG%	3P%	FT%	RPG	APG	SPG	BPG	PPG
2023	Kwara Falcons	5	5	24.5	.469	.778	.667	6.8	4.8	1.8	.0	8.6
