= Zenith Women Basketball League =

Women's basketball league in Nigeria

Zenith NBBF Women Basketball League (ZNWBL)
- Current season, competition or edition: 2026
- Sport: Basketball
- Founded: 2004 (in current format)
- First season: 2005
- No. of teams: 16
- Country: Nigeria
- Continent: FIBA Africa (Africa)
- Most recent champion: MFM Queens (3rd title) (2026)
- Most titles: First Bank (9 titles)
- Website: Official website

The National Women Basketball League, known as Zenith NBBF Women Basketball League for sponsorship reasons, is the top-level women's basketball club competition in Nigeria. It is the women's version of Nigeria Premier League organized by the Nigeria Basketball Federation. The league also determines the Nigerian representatives at FIBA Africa Women's Clubs Champions Cup.

== History ==
The league started with five teams, however the number grew to eighteen by 2017. The league has been sponsored by Zenith Bank since 2004. In 2017, after the expiration of the contract agreement between NBBF and Zenith Bank, the banking institution renewed the terms of the negotiation with bigger winning bonus for the winning teams. The 2026 winner of the league received a ₦7.5m prize money.

The league was suspended for 3 years after the 2019 season, the first two years due to the COVID-19 pandemic and in 2022 due to a disputed election within the Nigeria Basketball Federation. The league resumed in August 2023, with MFM Queens winning the title in late October. They retained the title in 2024 but took bronze in 2025, with Dolphins emerging Champions after defeating First Bank in a pulsating final.

MFM Queens reclaimed the title in the 2026 season edging First Bank in a thrilling overtime final 66-64 for their 3rd Win in four years.

Players in the league are semi-pro, with most receiving an average stipend.

== Teams ==
The following are the Fourteen teams that participate in the 2026 ZNWBL Season:

Team	Location
First Deepwater	Lagos
Nigeria Customs	Abuja
Elephant Girls (aka First Bank)	Lagos
MFM Queens	Lagos
Royal Aces	Abuja
Air Warriors	Abuja
IGP Queens	Lagos
Plateau Rocks	Plateau State
Victoria Queens	Abuja
Dolphins	Lagos
Bayelsa Blue Whales	Yenagoa
Aso Sky Queens	Abuja
Nasarawa Amazons	Nasarawa State
Titans	Abuja

== List of winners ==
Year	Winner	Runner-up	Ref
2026	MFM Queens	First Bank	
2025	Dolphins	First Bank	
2024	MFM Queens	Nigeria Customs	
2023	MFM Queens	Nigeria Customs	
2019	Air Warriors	MFM Queens	
2018	First Bank	First Deepwater	
2017	First Bank	First Deepwater	
2016	First Bank	Dolphins	
2015	Dolphins	First Bank	
2014	First Bank	Dolphins	
2013	First Deepwater	Dolphins	
2012	First Deepwater	First Bank	
2011	First Deepwater	First Bank	
2010	First Deepwater	First Bank	
2009	First Bank	First Deepwater	
2008	First Bank	Dolphins	
2007	First Bank	Dolphins	
2006	First Bank	Dolphins	
2005	First Bank	Dolphins	
