= Kwara Falcons =

- Conference: Atlantic
- Leagues: Nigerian Premier League
- Founded: 1980
- History: Kwara Falcons (1980–present)
- Arena: Indoor Sports Hall
- Capacity: 2,000
- Location: Ilorin, Kwara, Nigeria
- President: Aliu Jubril
- Head coach: Baba Jubril
- Team captain: Ajileye Seyi Gideon
- Championships: 1 (2022)

The Kwara Falcons are a Nigerian basketball team based in Ilorin, Kwara. The team plays in the Nigerian Premier League and has won one championship in 2022. Following their national championship, the Falcons also competed in the Basketball Africa League (BAL) in 2023.

Founded in 1980, the Falcons play their home games at the Indoor Sports Hall of the Kwara Stadium.

== History ==
The Kwara Falcons were founded in 1980.

The Kwara Falcons were promoted to the Premier League in 2013, after winning the Atlantic Conference in the Division 1. In their first season in the top-flight, the Falcons managed to avoid relegation. In 2015, the team finished third in the Atlantic Conference, behind star players such as Baba Jubril, Lanre Alimi and Tunde El-Alawa. In 2016 and 2017, the Falcons reached the semi-finals of the national championship.

In 2018, Kwara were the runners-up of the Premier League, finishing only behind Rivers Hoopers.

On November 12, 2022, the Falcons won their first-ever national championship after winning the 2022 season. As a result, they qualified directly for the 2023 season of the Basketball Africa League (BAL).

For their inaugural BAL season, the Falcons strengthened their roster with AJ Wilson, Michael Kolawole and Jeremiah Mordi. The Falcons were drawn into the Sahara Conference and lost all five of its games.

The Kwara Falcons drew an average home attendance of 398 in the 2024 NBBF Premier League, one of the highest averages of all Nigerian basketball clubs.

== Honours ==
Nigerian Premier League

- Champions (1): 2022
  - Runner-up (1): 2018
    - Third place (1): 2019

Louis Edem Invitational Tournament

- Winners (1): 2023

== Players ==
=== 2023 roster ===
The following Kwara Falcons roster played in the 2023 BAL season.

Note: Flags indicate national team eligibility at FIBA-sanctioned events. Players may hold other non-FIBA nationalities not displayed.

Kwara Falcons roster
Players
Coaches

| Pos. | No. | Nat. | Name | Ht. | Wt. | Age |
|---|---|---|---|---|---|---|
| G | 00 | (Nigeria) | Oriakhi, Michael | 1.83 m (6 ft 0 in) | | 23 – 9 May 2003 |
| PG | 2 | (Senegal) | Thiam, Modou Fall (E) | | | 21 – 25 May 2005 |
| PF | 4 | (Nigeria) | Adekoya, Jawad | | | 32 – 4 January 1994 |
| SF | 7 | (Nigeria) | Kolawole, Michael | | | 28 – 7 August 1997 |
| SG | 10 | (Nigeria) | Kareem, Ademola | | | 28 – 8 October 1997 |
| PF | 13 | (United States) | Wilson Jr., Anthony | | | 28 – 16 October 1997 |
| SG | 14 | (Nigeria) | Ezeh, Victor | | | 23 – 12 February 2003 |
| PF | 15 | (Nigeria) | Mohammed, Victor | | | 24 – 3 April 2002 |
| PF | 23 | (Sierra Leone) | Conteh, Sita | | | 27 – 3 August 1998 |
| SG | 24 | (Nigeria) | Mordi, Jeremiah | | | 33 – 7 January 1993 |
| F/C | 34 | (United States) | Monyyong, Ruot | | | 28 – 14 February 1998 |
| F/C | 41 | (Cameroon) | Nyemeck, Kevin | | | 24 – 7 October 2001 |
| F/C | 45 | (Nigeria) | Akpejiori, Austin | | | 28 – 9 August 1997 |

Head coach

- (Nigeria) Baba Jubril

Assistant coach(es)

- (Nigeria) Babajide Arigbede
- (Nigeria) Azeez Bello

Legend

- (C) Team captain
- Injured

- Roster
Updated: 25 September 2023
