= Zaire Wade =

American basketball player (born 2002)

Free agent
- Position: Point guard / shooting guard

Personal information
- Born: February 4, 2002 (age 24) Chicago, Illinois, U.S.
- Listed height: 6 ft 3 in (1.91 m)
- Listed weight: 176 lb (80 kg)

Career information
- High school: Sierra Canyon (Chatsworth, California); Brewster Academy (Wolfeboro, New Hampshire)
- NBA draft: 2022: undrafted
- Playing career: 2021–present

Career history
- 2021–2022: Salt Lake City Stars
- 2023: Cape Town Tigers

Zaire Blessing Dwyane Wade (/zɑːˈɪər/, born February 4, 2002) is an American professional basketball player who last played for the Cape Town Tigers of the Basketball Africa League (BAL). He is the son of former NBA player Dwyane Wade.

== Early life and high school career ==
Wade was born on February 4, 2002, in Chicago, Illinois, to then-Marquette Golden Eagles basketball player Dwyane Wade. He grew up in Chicago and Miami, where his father spent most of his NBA career.

For his freshman year of high school, Wade played basketball at Mount Carmel High School in Chicago. Also on the team, nicknamed 'the Caravan', was his cousin Dahveon Morris. Both played on the school's freshman team. For Wade's next two years of high school he played basketball at American Heritage School in Plantation, Florida. On May 29, 2019, it was announced that Wade would transfer to Sierra Canyon School, a private K–12 school in Chatsworth, California, for his 2019–20 senior year in high school.

After high school, he transferred to Brewster Academy in Wolfeboro, New Hampshire. He received scholarship offers from DePaul, Nebraska, Rhode Island and Toledo, but opted to turn professional instead.

College recruiting
Name	Hometown	School	Height	Weight	Commit date
Zaire Wade; PG	Chicago, IL	Brewster Academy (NH)	6 ft 1 in (1.85 m)	170 lb (77 kg)	—
Zaire Wade; PG	Recruit ratings: Rivals: 247Sports: ESPN: (76)				
Overall recruit ranking: Rivals: — 247Sports: — ESPN: —
Note: In many cases, Scout, Rivals, 247Sports, On3, and ESPN may conflict in their listings of height and weight.; In these cases, the average was taken. ESPN grades are on a 100-point scale.; Sources: "2021 Team Ranking". Rivals.

== Professional career ==
=== Salt Lake City Stars (2021–2022) ===
On October 23, 2021, Wade was selected with the 10th pick in the 2021 NBA G League draft by the Salt Lake City Stars. On March 12, 2022, he was moved to the short-term injured list by the team. On March 23, 2022, Wade was ruled out for the remainder of the year after suffering a season-ending injury.

=== Cape Town Tigers (2023) ===
On February 4, 2023, Wade signed with the Cape Town Tigers of the Basketball Africa League. On May 4, he scored a career-high 17 points in a 76–82 Tigers loss to Ferroviário da Beira in the Nile Conference.

On April 13, 2024, Wade signed with the Macau Black Bears of The Asian Tournament (TAT).

== Career statistics ==
Legend
GP	Games played	GS	Games started	MPG	Minutes per game
FG%	Field goal percentage	3P%	3-point field goal percentage	FT%	Free throw percentage
RPG	Rebounds per game	APG	Assists per game	SPG	Steals per game
BPG	Blocks per game	PPG	Points per game	**Bold**	Career high

=== NBA G League ===
Year	Team	GP	GS	MPG	FG%	3P%	FT%	RPG	APG	SPG	BPG	PPG
2021–22	Salt Lake City	12	1	18.6	.267	.188	.667	2.5	1.3	.8	.4	1.8
Career		12	1	18.6	.267	.188	.667	2.5	1.3	.8	.4	1.8

== Personal life ==
Wade is the son of former National Basketball Association (NBA) shooting guard and Naismith Basketball Hall of Fame inductee Dwyane Wade and his former wife, Siohvaughn Funches.

On June 21, 2026, Wade was arrested for domestic violence after an alleged dispute at his Burbank home. The police were called at 5:30 am that morning after someone heard a woman screaming. Wade was taken to jail but was released a few hours later after posting a $50,000 bond.
