= Nigeria Customs (basketball) =

- Nickname: Border Boys
- League: Nigerian Premier League
- Location: Lagos, Nigeria
- Team colors: Green and Grey
- Ownership: Nigeria Customs Service

Nigeria Customs, also known simply as Customs, is a Nigerian basketball team based in Lagos. It is the basketball team of the Nigeria Customs Service (NCS), and they play in the Nigerian Premier League, the top-level division of basketball in the country.

Nicknamed the "Border Boys", Customs made their debut on the continental level during the Zone 3 qualifiers for the 2016 FIBA Africa Clubs Champions Cup.

The men's team have been runners-up of the Premier League twice: in 2016 and 2022. Customs won the Mark D Basketball Tournament in 2022. The women's team won the Zenith Basketball League in 2023, and played at the 2023 Africa Women's Basketball League.

== Honours ==
=== Men's team ===
Nigerian Premier League

- Runners-up (2): 2016, 2022

Mark D Ball Tournament

- Winners (1): 2022

=== Women's team ===
Zenith Women Basketball League

- Champions (1): 2023
