= Victor Ezeh =

Nigerian basketball player (born 2003)

No. 14 – NMJC Thunderbirds
- Position: Shooting guard.

Personal information
- Born: 12 February 2003 (age 23) Lagos, Nigeria
- Listed height: 1.98 m (6 ft 6 in)
- Listed weight: 83 kg (183 lb)

Career information
- High school: NBA Academy Africa (Saly, Senegal)
- College: New Mexico Junior College (2023–2025)
- Playing career: 2023–present

Career history
- 2023: Kwara Falcons

Victor Ezeh (born 12 February 2003) is a Nigerian basketball player who plays for the Nigeria national team. A graduate of the NBA Academy Africa, he has been considered as one of the top talents in Nigerian basketball.

== Early career ==
Born in Lagos, Ezeh attended the NBA Academy Africa in Saly, Senegal.

== Professional career ==
Ezeh was drafted by REG to play in the 2022 season of the Basketball Africa League (BAL) under the BAL Elevate program, however, he was unable to participate as he was at another tournament in Atlanta.

One year later, Ezeh made played in the BAL with the Kwara Falcons from his native Nigeria. He was connected with the team with the help of former player Olumide Oyedeji. Ezeh was the captain of the Falcons during the 2023 BAL season and on 15 March 2023, Ezeh scored a career-high 22 points against the defending BAL champions US Monastir.

== College career ==
Ezeh joined the New Mexico Junior College basketball team in the 2023–24 season, and redshirted his freshman season.

== National team career ==
In February 2023, Ezeh was selected for the Nigeria national men's team for the first time when he joined the team for the 2023 World Cup qualifiers On 24 February, Ezeh scored 18 points in his D'Tigers debut as he guided Nigeria to a 72–63 win over Ivory Coast, ending their seven-game winning streak.

== BAL career statistics ==
Legend
GP	Games played	GS	Games started	MPG	Minutes per game
FG%	Field goal percentage	3P%	3-point field goal percentage	FT%	Free throw percentage
RPG	Rebounds per game	APG	Assists per game	SPG	Steals per game
BPG	Blocks per game	PPG	Points per game	**Bold**	Career high

Year	Team	GP	GS	MPG	FG%	3P%	FT%	RPG	APG	SPG	BPG	PPG
2023	Kwara Falcons	5	5	23.1	.310	.226	.692	3.2	1.2	.6	.2	10.4
