= Damian Hollis =

Hungarian-American basketball player (born 1988)

Astros de Jalisco
- Position: Small forward

Personal information
- Born: August 19, 1988 (age 38) Fort Lauderdale, Florida, U.S.
- Listed height: 6 ft 8 in (2.03 m)
- Listed weight: 227 lb (103 kg)

Career information
- High school: J. P. Taravella (Coral Springs, Florida)
- College: George Washington (2006–2010)
- NBA draft: 2010: undrafted
- Playing career: 2010–present

Career history
- 2010–2013: Alba Fehérvár
- 2013–2014: Biella
- 2014–2015: Cantù
- 2015: Rethymno
- 2015–2016: Brescia Leonessa
- 2016–2017: Benfica
- 2017–2017: Varese
- 2018–2019: Bergamo
- 2019–2020: Benfica
- 2020–2021: Agribertocchi Orzinuovi
- 2023: Petro de Luanda
- 2024–present: Astros de Jalisco

Career highlights
- Angolan Cup winner (2023); LPB champion (2017); Portuguese Cup winner (2017); Serie A2 champion (2016); Hungarian League champion (2013); Hungarian Cup winner (2013)
Medals
Representing United States
Men's basketball
FIBA Under-19 World Championship
Silver medal – second place	2007 Serbia	National Team

Damian Angelo Hollis (born August 19, 1988) is a Hungarian professional basketball player for the Astros de Jalisco of the CIBACOPA. Born in the United States, he has represented Hungary in international competition.

== Early life ==
Hollis was born in Fort Lauderdale, Florida. His father, Essie, was a basketball player. When he was younger and started sports, basketball was the last sport he played. Damian started in soccer then baseball and he was better at those than he was basketball. Hollis started actually being good when he was around 14 years old, working with his father, who played in the NBA 1 year for the Detroit Pistons and 14 years in Europe. By the time Hollis got to high school, he already stopped playing soccer though it was his first love but his new decision was between baseball and basketball. Damian loved baseball because it was easier for him, but basketball was just more exciting, so Hollis decided to continue that in college.

Hollis attended J. P. Taravella High School in Coral Springs, Florida, where he was a four-year starter on the basketball team, as well as a three-time team MVP. As a senior, he averaged 22.3 points, 10.1 rebounds, and 3.4 assists per game and earned all-county honors from the Sun Sentinel.

== College career ==
After a successful career in high school, Hollis wanted to keep playing basketball in college. His dream school was North Carolina in Chapel Hill. He got scholarship offers from about 100 Division I and II school but North Carolina wasn't one of them. As time went on, Hollis assumed that they would never want him so he committed to George Washington University who was number 3 in the nation at the time. A few days later while he was in class, a coach from North Carolina called his phone asking if he has committed to a college yet. They were ready to offer him a scholarship but he couldn't take it. Dame went into a depression over the next few weeks. He had to stay with his commitment despite this school being his dream come true.

== Professional career ==
From 2010 to 2013, Hollis played with Hungarian club Albacomp. In the 2012–13 season, Hollis won the Hungarian Championship and the Hungarian Cup with Bericap Alba Fehérvár (the new name of Albacomp Fehérvár).

In August 2013, Hollis signed a one-year deal with Angelico Biella.

In July 2014, Hollis signed with Pallacanestro Cantù for the 2014–15 season. On March 23, 2015, he parted ways with Cantù and signed with Rethymno Aegean for the rest of the 2014–15 Greek Basket League season.

On August 5, 2015, Hollis signed with Basket Brescia Leonessa of the Italian Serie A2 Basket.

On July 24, 2016, Hollis joined Portuguese club S.L. Benfica in the Liga Portuguesa de Basquetebol.

On August 2, 2017, Hollis signed with Italian club Pallacanestro Varese for the 2017–18 season. On January 26, 2018, he parted ways with Varese after averaging 6.8 points per game in LBA. The same day, he signed with Bergamo for the rest of the 2017–18 Serie A2 Basket season.

He signed with Benfica in July 2019. He averaged 10.2 points and 4.4 rebounds per game. On July 30, 2020, Hollis signed with Agribertocchi Orzinuovi of the Serie A2 Basket.

On January 4, 2023, Hollis signed with the Angolan club Petro de Luanda of the Angolan Basketball League and the Basketball Africa League (BAL). In March 2023, he won the Angolan Cup with Petro.

Hollis joined the Astros de Jalisco of the Circuito de Baloncesto de la Costa del Pacífico (CIBACOPA) ahead of the 2024 CIBACOPA season.

== National team career ==
Having previously represented the United States Under-19 national team in 2007, in the fall of 2012, Hollis became a dual citizen of Hungary in the hope of playing for the Hungary national basketball team.

== Hungarian career statistics ==
Legend
GP	Games played	GS	Games started	MPG	Minutes per game
FG%	Field goal percentage	3P%	3-point field goal percentage	FT%	Free throw percentage
RPG	Rebounds per game	APG	Assists per game	SPG	Steals per game
BPG	Blocks per game	PPG	Points per game	**Bold**	Career high

=== Regular season ===
Year	Team	GP	GS	MPG	FG%	3P%	FT%	RPG	APG	SPG	BPG	PPG
2010–11	Albacomp Fehérvár	**26**	15	27.3	.510	.360	.827	**6.3**	1	**1.7**	0.3	13
2011–12	Albacomp Fehérvár	25	20	27.1	**.648**	**.380**	.827	5.6	1.2	1.6	**0.5**	**15.3**
2012–13	Alba Fehérvár	21	**21**	**28.0**	.626	.375	**.860**	5.6	**1.5**	**1.7**	0.3	13.0
Career		72	56	27.4	.594	.372	.838	5.9	1.2	1.7	0.4	13.8

=== Pre-Playoffs ===
Year	Team	GP	GS	MPG	FG%	3P%	FT%	RPG	APG	SPG	BPG	PPG
2013	Alba Fehérvár	10	8	24.6	.508	.296	.733	5.8	1.1	1	0.5	11.2
Career		10	8	24.6	.508	.296	.733	5.8	1.1	1	0.5	11.2

=== Playoffs ===
Year	Team	GP	GS	MPG	FG%	3P%	FT%	RPG	APG	SPG	BPG	PPG
2011	Albacomp Fehérvár	10	2	24.1	.609	.347	.833	6	1.2	1.2	**1**	11.7
2012	Albacomp Fehérvár	8	8	27.3	**.682**	**.407**	**.857**	5	1.2	1.7	0.5	**16.4**
2013	Bericap Albacomp Fehérvár	**14**	**14**	**30.6**	.538	.405	.769	**6.6**	**1.6**	**1.9**	0.6	14.8
Career												

=== Hungarian Cup ===
Year	Team	GP	GS	MPG	FG%	3P%	FT%	RPG	APG	SPG	BPG	PPG
2011	Albacomp Fehérvár	6	6	**28.5**	0.533	0.312	0.818	**6.3**	1.2	1.5	0.3	12
2012	Albacomp Fehérvár	6	6	27.1	0.614	0.461	0.642	5.2	**1.6**	1.5	0.2	16.2
2013	Alba Fehérvár	6	6	26.8	**0.615**	**0.524**	**0.950**	5.3	1.2	1.2	0.7	**16.7**
Career		18	18									

=== Full career ===
Year	Team	GP	GS	MPG	FG%	3P%	FT%	RPG	APG	SPG	BPG	PPG
2010–11	Albacomp Fehérvár	**42**	23	26.7	.538	.350	**.827**	**6.2**	1	1.5	**0.5**	12.5
2011–12	Albacomp Fehérvár	39	**34**	**27.2**	**.652**	**.397**	.824	5.4	**1.2**	**1.7**	0.4	**15.6**
Total		81	57	26.9	.596	.373	.826	5.8	1.1	1.6	0.5	14
