= Michael Gbinije =

Nigerian-American basketball player (born 1992)

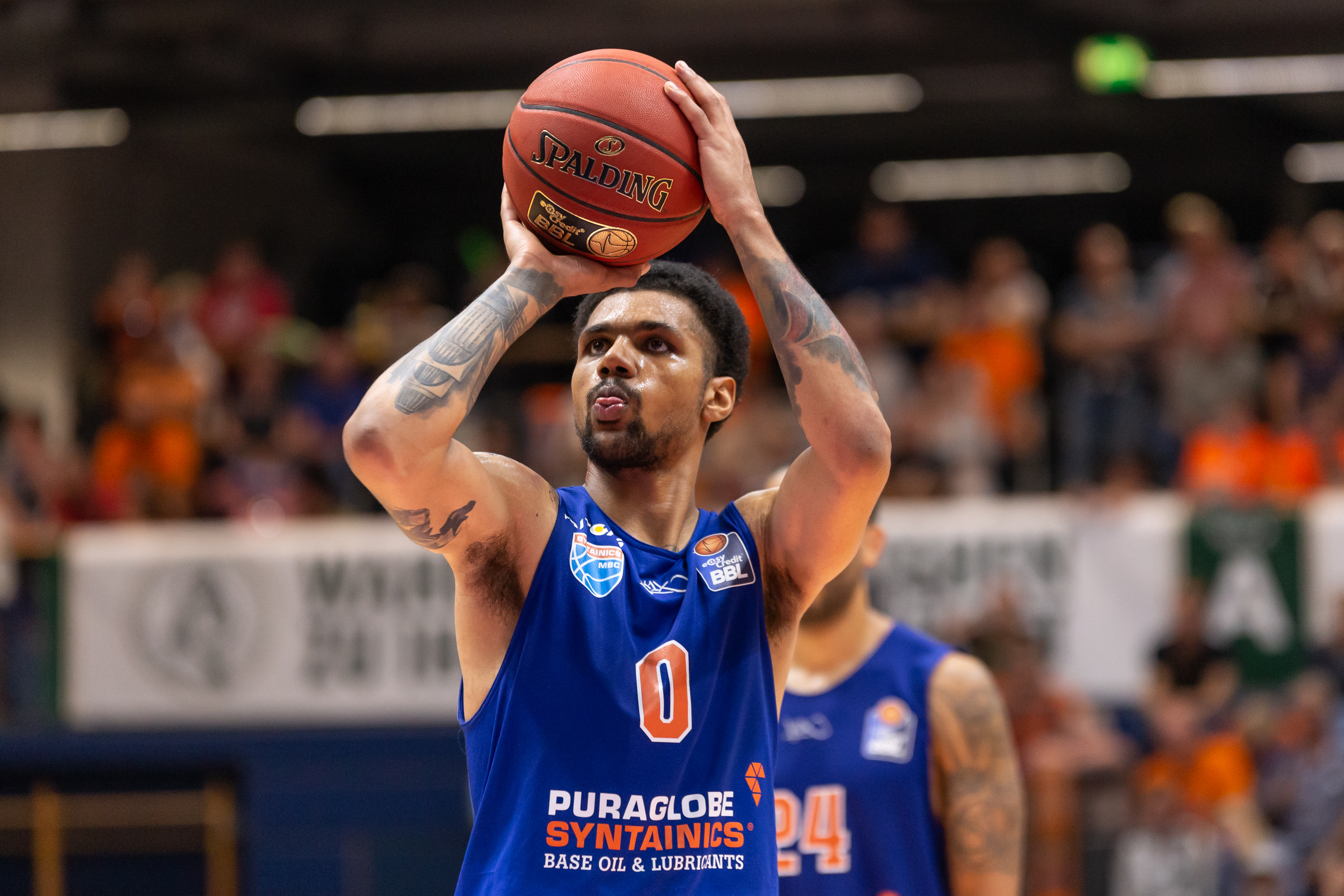
- Gbinije in action with Mitteldeutscher BC.

Free agent
- Position: Shooting guard / small forward

Personal information
- Born: June 5, 1992 (age 34) Hartford, Connecticut, U.S.
- Listed height: 6 ft 7 in (2.01 m)
- Listed weight: 200 lb (91 kg)

Career information
- High school: Benedictine (Richmond, Virginia)
- College: Duke (2011–2012); Syracuse (2013–2016)
- NBA draft: 2016: 2nd round, 49th overall pick
- Drafted by: Detroit Pistons
- Playing career: 2016–present

Career history
- 2016–2017: Detroit Pistons
- 2016–2017: →Grand Rapids Drive
- 2017–2019: Santa Cruz Warriors
- 2019–2020: Mitteldeutscher BC
- 2020: Nevėžis Kėdainiai
- 2021–2022: Oklahoma City Blue
- 2022–2023: Cape Town Tigers
- 2023–2024: Tabiat Tehran

Career highlights
- Second-team All-ACC (2016)
- Stats at NBA.com
- Stats at Basketball Reference

Michael Patrick Gbinije (born June 5, 1992) is a Nigerian-American professional basketball player for the Cape Town Tigers of the Basketball Africa League. He played one season of college basketball for Duke before transferring to Syracuse in 2012. He was drafted 49th overall by the Pistons in the 2016 NBA draft. He has represented the Nigerian national team.

== High school career ==
Gbinije competed for Benedictine High School. As a junior, Gbinije averaged 18.0 points and 6.0 rebounds per game. He averaged 25.0 points, 10.0 rebounds and 5.0 assists as a senior and was named first team all-state. He led Benedictine to a 26–5 record and the VISAA Division I State Championship. Gbinije was ranked 28th in the 2011 class by ESPNU 100 and 26th overall by Scout.com.

== College career ==
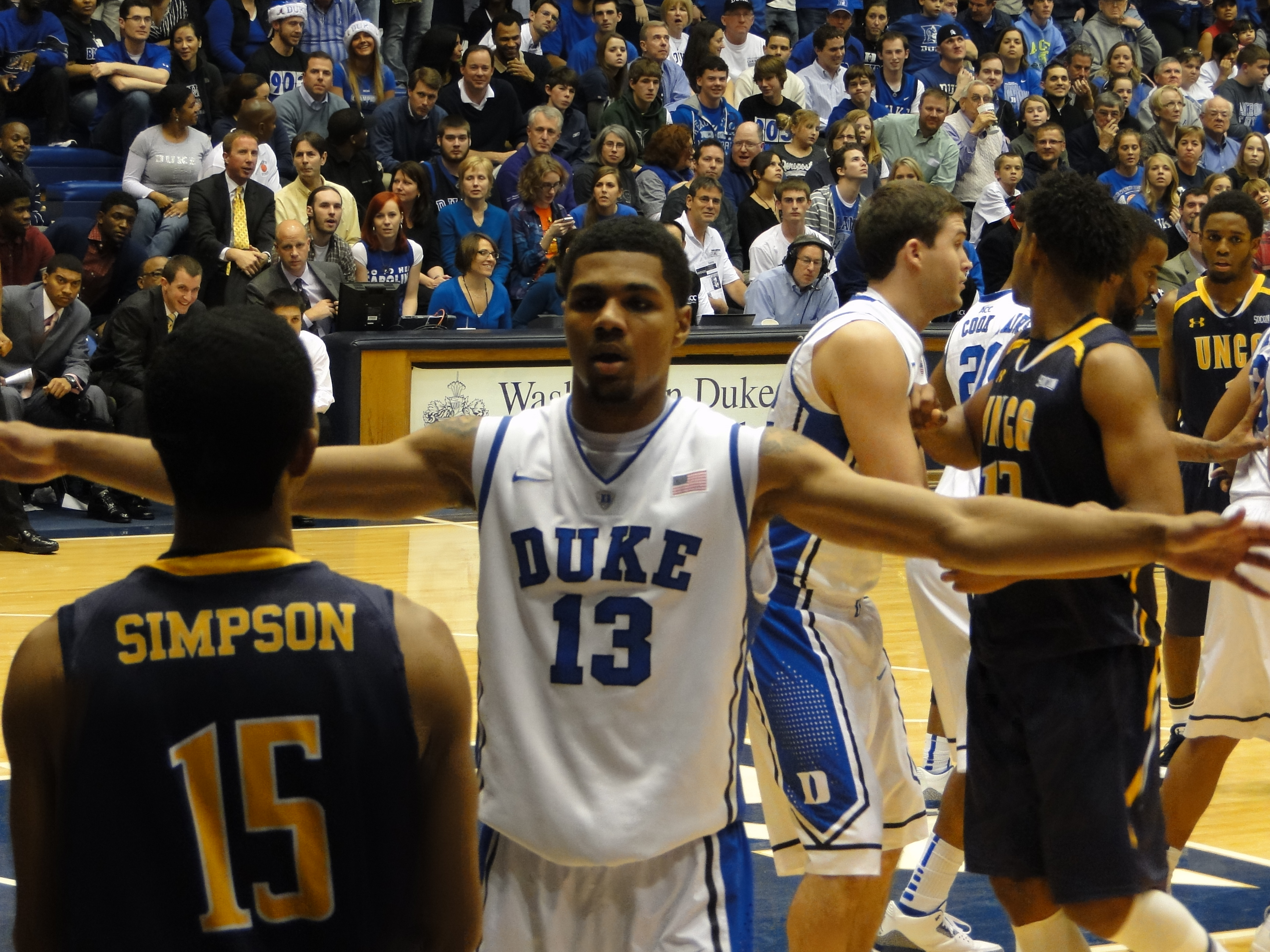
Gbinije (13) during his time at Duke

Gbinije began his collegiate career at Duke, where he played sparingly as freshman and averaged 1.7 points in 19 games. He opted to transfer to Syracuse after his freshman year and sat out the 2012–13 season as a redshirt. As a sophomore, Gbinije averaged 3.4 points, 1.8 rebounds, and 1.2 assists per game. He increased those numbers to 12.7 points, 5.0 rebounds, and 3.6 assists per game as a junior in 2014–15. On February 14, 2015, he scored a career-high 27 points against Duke to go along with four assists in an 80–72 loss. As a senior in 2015–16, he averaged 17.5 points, 4.1 rebounds, 4.3 assists, and 1.9 steals per game while shooting 39% from beyond the three-point line and 46% overall. Gbinije started all 37 games of the season and helped lead the Orange on an improbable run to the 2016 NCAA Final Four.

== Professional career ==
=== Detroit Pistons (2016–2017) ===
On June 23, 2016, Gbinije was selected by the Detroit Pistons with the 49th overall pick in the 2016 NBA draft. He was drafted for his defense, versatility and athleticism. On July 3, 2016, he suffered a sprained ankle and was ruled out for the entire 2016 NBA Summer League. Despite the injury, he signed with the Pistons on July 14. During his rookie season, Gbinije had multiple assignments with the Grand Rapids Drive, the Pistons' D-League affiliate. On July 15, 2017, he was waived by the Pistons.

=== Santa Cruz Warriors (2017–2019) ===
On September 6, 2017, Gbinije signed a training camp deal with the Golden State Warriors and appeared in 4 preseason games. He was waived by the Warriors on October 14, 2017. A couple days later, Gbinije was then signed with the Santa Cruz Warriors in the NBA G League.

On June 29, 2018, the Knicks announced that Gbinije would be on their summer league team.

=== Mitteldeutscher BC (2019–2020) ===
On July 17, 2019, Gbinije signed with Mitteldeutscher BC of the Basketball Bundesliga. In 17 games, he averaged 11.2 points, 2.5 rebounds, 2.1 assists and 1.1 steals per game.

=== BC Nevėžis (2020) ===
On February 13, 2020, Gbinije signed with BC Nevėžis of the Lithuanian league.

=== Oklahoma City Blue (2021–2022) ===
Gbinije was selected with the ninth pick in the 2021 NBA G League draft by the Iowa Wolves. He was traded to the Oklahoma City Blue for a pair of later-round picks. He was then later waived on January 31, 2022.

=== Return to OKC Blue (2022) ===
On February 10, 2022, Gbinije was reacquired and activated by the Oklahoma City Blue. Gbinije was then later waived on March 4, 2022. Gbinije was reacquired on March 6, 2022.

=== Cape Town Tigers (2022–2023) ===
On October 17, 2022, it was announced Gbinije had signed with the South African team Cape Town Tigers for the 2022–23 season.

== NBA career statistics ==
Legend
GP	Games played	GS	Games started	MPG	Minutes per game
FG%	Field goal percentage	3P%	3-point field goal percentage	FT%	Free throw percentage
RPG	Rebounds per game	APG	Assists per game	SPG	Steals per game
BPG	Blocks per game	PPG	Points per game	**Bold**	Career high

=== Regular season ===
Year	Team	GP	GS	MPG	FG%	3P%	FT%	RPG	APG	SPG	BPG	PPG
2016–17	Detroit	9	0	3.6	.100	.000	1.000	.3	.2	.0	.0	.4
Career		9	0	3.6	.100	.000	1.000	.3	.2	.0	.0	.4

== National team career ==
Gbinije competed on the Nigerian squad in AfroBasket 2015 because his father, Frank, is a native of Nigeria. He helped Nigeria win gold in the tournament and qualify for the 2016 Summer Olympics, scoring five points in the championship game against Angola. "Playing on this team was a unique experience for me," he said. "Overall, I enjoyed playing with these guys." Overall, Gbinije averaged 7.3 points and 2.1 rebounds per game in the tournament and scored in double figures twice in eight games.

== Personal life ==
He is the son of Frank, an All-American soccer player at Temple, and Yvette Gbinije. He enrolled in the College of Visual and Performing Arts and majored in communication and rhetorical studies.
