= 2020–21 Patriots BBC season =

6th season in existence of Patriots BBC

Patriots BBC
2020–21 season
- Head coach: Alan Major (BAL); Ben Oluoch (NBL Rwanda)
- NBL Rwanda: Runners-up (lost to REG)
- Basketball Africa League: Fourth place (lost to Petro de Luanda)

The 2020–21 season was the 6th season in the existence of Patriots BBC, and its 1st in the Basketball Africa League (BAL) and began its season May 16, 2021. The team played in the NBL Rwanda and began its season on June 4, 2021, and ended on October 30, 2021.

The Patriots finished in the fourth place in the inaugural BAL season and were runners-up of their national league.

== Roster ==
=== Team ===
Patriots BBC roster
Players
Coaches

Pos.	No.	Nat.	Name	Ht.	Age
PG	2	(Rwanda)	Mugabe, Aristide (C)	1.83 m (6 ft 0 in)	38 – 11 February 1988
PG	5	(Rwanda)	Sagamba, Sedard	1.85 m (6 ft 1 in)	36 – 1 January 1990
PG	10	(Rwanda)	Sano, Gasana	1.93 m (6 ft 4 in)	27 – 4 September 1999
PG	11	(Rwanda)	Nshobozwabyosenumukiza, Wilson	1.83 m (6 ft 0 in)	28 – 26 June 1998
SG	12	(Rwanda)	Gasana, Kenny	1.91 m (6 ft 3 in)	41 – 9 November 1984
PF	14	(Kenya)	Wamukota, Bush (I)	2.06 m (6 ft 9 in)	33 – 28 September 1993
SG	15	(United States)	Cole, Jermaine (I)	1.91 m (6 ft 3 in)	41 – 28 January 1985
SG	22	(Rwanda)	Ndizeye, Dieudonné	1.98 m (6 ft 6 in)	30 – 14 October 1996
SG	23	(Rwanda)	Hagumintwari, Steve	1.93 m (6 ft 4 in)	33 – 1 October 1993
C	24	(Rwanda)	Ndoli, Jean-Paul	2.03 m (6 ft 8 in)	31 – 30 April 1995
C	32	(Rwanda)	Ibeh, Prince	2.06 m (6 ft 9 in)	32 – 3 June 1994
PF	33	(United States)	Costner, Brandon (I)	2.01 m (6 ft 7 in)	39 – 21 July 1987
C	34	(Rwanda)	Kaje, Elie	1.91 m (6 ft 3 in)	31 – 17 March 1995

Head coach

- (United States) Alan Major

Assistant coach(es)

- (Kenya) Bernard Oluoch
- (Burundi) Olivier Ndayiragije

Legend

- (C) Team captain
- (I) Import player
- Injured

- Roster
Updated: May 16, 2021

=== Additions ===
No.	Pos.	Nat.	Name	Moving from		Date	Source
33	PF	(United States)	Brandon Costner	Santeros de Aguada	(Puerto Rico)	May 11, 2021	
15	PG	(United States)	Jermaine Cole			May 11, 2021	
32	C	(Rwanda)	Prince Ibeh	Plymouth Raiders	(United Kingdom)	May 11, 2021	
11	PG	(Rwanda)	Wilson Nshobozwabyosenumukiza	REG	(Rwanda)		

== BAL ==
=== Group phase ===
Pos	Team	Pld	W	L	PF	PA	PD	Pts	Qualification
1	(Tunisia) US Monastir	3	3	0	303	211	+92	6	Advance to playoffs
2	(Rwanda) Patriots (H)	3	2	1	236	223	+13	5	Advance to playoffs
3	(Nigeria) Rivers Hoopers	3	1	2	210	251	−41	4	
4	(Madagascar) GNBC	3	0	3	207	271	−64	3	

Source: BAL
(H) Hosts

2021 game log
Total: 1–2
Group Phase

Game	Date	Team	Score	High points	High rebounds	High assists	Location Attendance	Record
1	16 May	(Nigeria); Rivers Hoopers	W 83–60	Brandon Costner (20)	Prince Ibeh (11)	Kenny Gasana (4)	Kigali Arena; 2,000	1–0
2	19 May	(Madagascar); GNBC	W 72–78	Brandon Costner (16)	Tom Wamukota (11)	Kenny Gasana (4)	Kigali Arena; 1,022	2–0
3	22 May	(Tunisia); US Monastir	L 75–91	Kenny Gasana (22)	Brandon Costner (6)	Kenny Gasana (8)	Kigali Arena; 1,141	1–2

=== Playoffs ===
2021 playoff game log
Total: 1–2
Playoffs

Game	Date	Team	Score	High points	High rebounds	High assists	Location Attendance	Record
Quarterfinals	27 May	(Mozambique); Ferroviário de Maputo	W 73–71	Kenny Gasana (23)	Three players (5)	Brandon Costner (5)	Kigali Arena; 1,704	N/A
Semifinals	29 May	(Tunisia); US Monastir	L 87–46	Dieudonné Ndizeye (13)	Tom Wamukota (10)	Five players (2)	Kigali Arena; N/A	N/A
Third place	30 May	(Angola); Petro de Luanda	L 97–68	Kenny Gasana (18)	Dieudonné Ndizeye (8)	Gasana, Sagamba (3)	Kigali Arena; 747	N/A

== Statistics ==
Legend
GP	Games played	GS	Games started	MPG	Minutes per game	RPG	Rebounds per game
APG	Assists per game	SPG	Steals per game	BPG	Blocks per game	PPG	Points per game
FG%	Field-goal percentage	3P%	3-point field-goal percentage	FT%	Free-throw percentage	TO	Turnovers per game
PF	Fouls per game		Team leader		League leader

Player	GP	MPG	FG%	3P%	FT%	RPG	APG	SPG	BPG	PPG
Kenny Gasana	6	30.9	.424	.412	.941	4.2	3.7	1.3	0.3	14.3
Dieudonné Ndizeye	6	28.4	.338	.343	.750	5.0	1.8	0.7	0.5	11.5
Brandon Costner	6	25.5	.400	.364	.667	4.5	2.7	0.7	0.0	11.0
Prince Ibeh	6	20.2	.538	.000	.263	5.7	1.3	0.3	1.3	7.8
Aristide Mugabe	6	11.5	.542	.550	.818	1.2	1.0	0.5	0.0	7.7
Steven Hagumintwari	4	14.5	.333	.167	.667	3.5	0.5	0.8	0.0	5.8
Sedard Sagamba	6	19.1	.364	.200	1.000	3.2	2.5	0.5	0.0	4.7
Tom Wamukota	6	21.8	.213	.143	.500	6.3	1.2	0.5	0.3	4.2
Wilson Nshobozwabyosenumukiza	6	12.3	.350	.444	.667	2.5	1.2	1.2	0.0	3.3
Jermaine Cole	3	15.2	.286	.000	1.000	1.7	1.0	0.3	0.3	1.7
Elie Kaje	6	9.6	.500	.000	.200	2.0	0.5	0.2	0.2	1.3
Sano Gasana	3	4.6	.000	.000	.000	1.7	0.0	0.0	0.0	0.0
Jean-Paul Ndoli	2	2.6	.000	.000	.000	0.0	0.0	0.0	0.0	0.0

== NBL Rwanda ==
The following were the Patriots' games in the 2020–21 NBL Rwanda.

Date Time, TV	Opponent	Result	Record	Arena (attendance) City
Regular Season
June 4, 2021	vs. Shoot For The Stars BBC	W 113–63	1–0	Amahoro Outdoor Stadium; Kigali
June 5, 2021	vs. 30 Plus	W 75–36	2–0	Amahoro Outdoor Stadium; Kigali
June 11, 2021	vs. UR-Huye	W 82–36	3–0	Amahoro Outdoor Stadium; Kigali
June 5, 2021	vs. IPRC-Kigali	W 66-53	4–0	Amahoro Outdoor Stadium; Kigali
June 20, 2021	vs. IPRC-Musanze	W 82–42	5–0	Amahoro Outdoor Stadium; Kigali
June 26, 2021	vs. Shoot For The Stars BBC	W 88–60	6–0	Amahoro Outdoor Stadium; Kigali
June 27, 2021	vs. Tigers BBC	W 87–72	7–0	Amahoro Outdoor Stadium; Kigali
September 24, 2021	vs. UR-CMHS	W 89–50	8–0	Amahoro Outdoor Stadium; Kigali
September 25, 2021	vs. IPRC-Kigali	W 76–69	9–0	Amahoro Outdoor Stadium; Kigali
September 26, 2021	vs. 30 Plus	W 85–62	10–0	United Generations Basketball; Kigali
October 2, 2021	vs. IPRC-Musanze	W 112–61	11–0	Amahoro Outdoor Stadium; Kigali
Quarterfinals
October 9, 2021	vs. 30 Plus	W 106–61	12–0	Amahoro Outdoor Stadium; Kigali
Semifinals
October 16, 2021	vs. APR; Game 1	W 71–56	13–0	Amahoro Outdoor Stadium; Kigali
October 17, 2021	vs. APR; Game 2	W 69–56	14–0	Amahoro Outdoor Stadium; Kigali
Finals
October 29, 2021	at REG; Game 1	L 63–66	14–1	Kigali Arena (1,000); Kigali
October 30, 2021	REG; Game 2	L 49–64	14–2	Kigali Arena (500); Kigali
