= 2021–22 REG BBC season =

REG
2021–22 season
- Head coach: Robert Pack
- Basketball Africa League: 1st in Sahara Conference
- Playoffs: Quarterfinals (eliminated by FAP)
- Rwanda Basketball League: Ongoing

The 2021–22 REG BBC season is the 6th season in the history of the team, its 6th in the Rwanda Basketball League (RBL) and its 1st in the Basketball Africa League (BAL).

== Rosters ==
=== RBL roster ===
Note: Flags indicate national team, as has been defined under FIBA eligibility rules. Players may hold more than one non-FIBA nationality.

2021–22 REG roster
No.	Pos.	Nat.	Player
0	SG	(Rwanda) RWA	Herve Ikishatse
4	SF	(Rwanda) RWA	Emmanuel Iyakaremye
6	SG	(Rwanda) RWA	Parfait Ishimwe
7	SF	(Rwanda) RWA	Pascal Niyonkuru
11	C	(Rwanda) RWA	Christian Gatambira
24	PF	(Rwanda) RWA	Prince Muhizi
10	PF	(Democratic Republic of the Congo) COD	Kami Kabange
13	C	(Rwanda) RWA	Elie Kaje
14	SF	(Rwanda) RWA	Theoneste Gatsinzi
32	SG	(Cameroon) CMR	Engelbert Beleck Bell
80	PG	(Rwanda) RWA	Wilson Nshobozwabyosenumukiza

=== BAL roster ===
In May, Kenny Gasana and Abdoulaye N'Doye joined the team ahead of the playoffs; they replaced Pitchou Kambuy Manga and Ntore Habimana as active players on the roster.

REG BBC roster
Players
Coaches

Pos.	No.	Nat.	Name	Ht.	Age
PG	0	(Rwanda)	Filer, Adonis	1.88 m (6 ft 2 in)	31 – 11 July 1993
G	1	(Rwanda)	Vandriessche, Pierre	1.94 m (6 ft 4 in)	24 – 21 July 2000
SF	2	(Rwanda)	Ndizeye, Dieudonné	1.98 m (6 ft 6 in)	28 – 14 October 1996
G	5	(United States)	Thomas, Cleveland (WI)	1.93 m (6 ft 4 in)	31 – 2 December 1993
SG	10	(Rwanda)	Shyaka, Olivier	1.98 m (6 ft 6 in)	29 – 14 August 1995
PG	11	(Rwanda)	Nshobozwabyosenumukiza, Wilson	1.83 m (6 ft 0 in)	26 – 26 July 1998
PG	12	(Nigeria)	Ighovodja, Joy (E)	1.90 m (6 ft 3 in)	20 – 12 October 2004
C	13	(Rwanda)	Kaje, Elie (C)	1.90 m (6 ft 3 in)	29 – 17 March 1995
G	15	(Rwanda)	Habimana, Ntore	1.96 m (6 ft 5 in)	27 – 15 August 1997
F/C	21	(Rwanda)	Mpoyo, Axel	2.01 m (6 ft 7 in)	28 – 5 January 1997
G	23	(Rwanda)	Gasana, Kenny	1.90 m (6 ft 3 in)	40 – 9 November 1984
CG	24	(France)	N'Doye, Abdoulaye (WI)	1.99 m (6 ft 6 in)	27 – 9 March 1998
F/C	28	(Rwanda)	Kabange, Kami	2.03 m (6 ft 8 in)	40 – 2 July 1984
C	34	(Democratic Republic of the Congo)	Kambuy Manga, Pitchou (AI)	2.08 m (6 ft 10 in)	36 – 12 December 1988
C	41	(United States)	Walker, Anthony (WI)	2.06 m (6 ft 9 in)	31 – 22 July 1993

Head coach

- (United States) Robert Pack

Assistant coach(es)

- (Tanzania) Henry Mwinuka
- (Rwanda) Maxime Mwiseneza

Legend

- (C) Team captain
- (I) Import player
- (E): BAL Elevate player
- (WI): World import
- (AI): African import
- Injured

- Roster
Updated: May 20, 2022

== Transactions ==
=== Additions ===
Player	Signed	Former team
Cleveland Thomas	March 2022	(Cyprus) Apollon Patras
Igor Ighovodja	March 2022	NBA Academy Africa
Kenny Gasana	May 2022	(Rwanda) Patriots
Abdoulaye N'Doye	May 2022	(France) BCM Gravelines-Dunkerque

== Basketball Africa League ==
=== Standings ===
Sahara Conference

Pos	Team	Pld	W	L	PF	PA	PD	PCT	Qualification
1	(Rwanda) REG	5	4	1	431	423	+8	.800 (Note: Head-to-head: REG 77–74 US Monastir on 14 March 2022.)	Advance to playoffs
2	(Tunisia) US Monastir	5	4	1	397	355	+42	.800	Advance to playoffs
3	(Morocco) AS Salé	5	3	2	454	438	+16	.600	Advance to playoffs
4	(Guinea) SLAC	5	2	3	392	394	−2	.400	Advance to playoffs
5	(Mozambique) Ferroviário da Beira	5	1	4	416	448	−32	.200 (Note: Head-to-head: Ferroviário da Beira 98–92 DUC on 8 March 2022.)	
6	(Senegal) DUC (H)	5	1	4	402	434	−32	.200	

Source: BAL, Afrobasket
(H) Hosts

=== Results ===
Date Time, TV	Opponent	Result	Record	High points	High rebounds	High assists	Arena City
Sahara Conference
March 6, 2022; 14:00	vs. (Morocco) AS Salé	W 91–87	1–0	26 – Thomas	6 – Nshobozwabyosenumukiza	6 – Filer	Dakar Arena; Dakar
March 9, 2022; 17:30	vs. (Guinea) SLAC	W 83–81	2–0	24 – Thomas	8 – Ndizeye	7 – Filer	Dakar Arena; Dakar
March 11, 2022; 21:00	vs. (Senegal) DUC	L 86–92	2–1	23 – Filer	7 – Kambuy Manga	5 – Filer	Dakar Arena; Dakar
March 14, 2022; 17:30	vs. (Tunisia) US Monastir	W 77–74	3-1	16 – Kambuy Manga	10 – Kambuy Manga	9 – Filer	Dakar Arena; Dakar
March 15, 2022; 17:30	vs. (Mozambique) Ferroviário da Beira	W 94–89	4-1	28 – Nshobozwabyosenumukiza	13 – Ndizeye	12 – Filer	Dakar Arena; Dakar
Quarterfinals
May 21, 2022; 18:00	vs. (Cameroon) FAP	L 63–66	4-2	23 – Thomas	11 – Nshobozwabyosenumukiza	8 – Nshobozwabyosenumukiza	Kigali Arena (7,576); Kigali

== Rwanda Basketball League ==
The following were REG's games in the Rwanda Basketball League as its season began on March 23, 2022.

=== Results ===
Date Time, TV	Opponent	Result	Record	Arena City
Regular Season
March 23, 2022	vs. Tigers BBC	W 87-35	1–0	Amahoro Outdoor Stadium; Kigali
March 25, 2022	vs. United Generations Basketball	W 66–51	2–0	Amahoro Outdoor Stadium; Kigali
March 26, 2022	vs. Patriots	L 63–70	2–1	Kigali Arena; Kigali
March 30, 2022	vs. Shoot For The Stars BBC	W 86–67	3–1	Amahoro Outdoor Stadium; Kigali
April 1, 2022	vs. RP IPRC-Kigali	W 85–74	4–1	RP IPRC-Kigali; Kigali
April 3, 2022	vs. UR Huye BBC	W 75–38	5–1	Amahoro Outdoor Stadium; Kigali
April 9, 2022	vs. APR	W 79–70	6–1	Amahoro Outdoor Stadium; Kigali
April 15, 2022	vs. UR-CMHS	W 120–43	7–1	Amahoro Outdoor Stadium; Kigali
April 16, 2022	vs. Espoir	W 91–51	8–1	Kigali Arena; Kigali
April 23, 2022	vs. RP-IPRC Musanze	W 106–43	9–1	Kigali Arena; Kigali
April 24, 2022	vs. RP-IPRC Huye	W 108–72	10–1	Kigali Arena; Kigali
