= 2023 BAL playoffs =

Playoffs of the 2023 BAL season

2023 BAL Playoffs
Tournament details
- City: Kigali
- Venue(s): BK Arena
- Dates: 21 – 27 May 2023
- Teams: 8

Final positions
- Champions: (Egypt) Al Ahly (1st title)
- Runner-up: (Senegal) AS Douanes
- Third place: (Mali) Stade Malien
- Fourth place: (Angola) Petro de Luanda

Tournament statistics
- Matches played: 8

The 2023 BAL Playoffs was the postseason tournament of the 2023 BAL season to determine the champions of the third Basketball Africa League (BAL) season. For a third consecutive season, the playoffs will be hosted in the BK Arena in Kigali.

Al Ahly defeated AS Douanes in the final, for their first-ever BAL title.

== Qualified teams ==
On 16 March 2023, the BAL incorrectly reported that REG became the first team to qualify for the playoffs. US Monastir and ABC Fighters were also reported to have qualified on 20 March. However, only on the last day of the Sahara Conference, the final ranking was determined and the four advancing teams were decided based on their head-to-head point difference. Petro de Luanda was the first team from the Nile Conference to qualify.

=== Sahara Conference ===
Seed	Team	Record	Clinched	
Seed	Team	Record	Playoff berth	Best record in conference
1	(Mali) Stade Malien	3–2	21 March	21 March
2	(Senegal) AS Douanes	3–2	21 March	—
3	(Ivory Coast) ABC Fighters	3–2	21 March	—
4	(Rwanda) REG	3–2	21 March	—

=== Nile Conference ===
Seed	Team	Record	Clinched	
Seed	Team	Record	Playoff berth	Best record in conference
1	(Angola) Petro de Luanda	5–0	3 May	5 May
2	(Egypt) Al Ahly	4–1	5 May	—
3	(Mozambique) Ferroviário da Beira	2–3	6 May	—
4	(South Africa) Cape Town Tigers	2–3	6 May	—

== Bracket ==
Quarterfinals
21 May
(Egypt) Al Ahly	94
(Rwanda) REG	77
21 May
(Mali) Stade Malien	78
(South Africa) Cape Town Tigers	69
22 May
(Angola) Petro de Luanda	88
(Ivory Coast) ABC Fighters	84
22 May
(Senegal) AS Douanes	93
(Mozambique) Ferroviário da Beira	73

Semifinals
25 May
(Egypt) Al Ahly	78
(Mali) Stade Malien	73
25 May
(Angola) Petro de Luanda	86
(Senegal) AS Douanes	92

Final
27 May
(Egypt) Al Ahly	80
(Senegal) AS Douanes	65
Third place game
26 May
(Angola) Petro de Luanda	65
(Mali) Stade Malien	73

== Games ==
=== Quarter-finals ===
==== Al Ahly vs. REG ====
This was the second competitive game between the teams, who last met in the third round of Group C of the 2018–19 Africa Basketball League when Al Ahly won.

After taking a 8–5 lead, REG trailed in the rest of the game to the Egyptian champions Al Ahly. During the third quarter, Al Ahly led by as much as 23 points. Adonis Filer scored a game-high 26 points for REG, while Ehab Amin scored 22 points for the Egyptians.

21 May 2023
16:00

Report
Livestats

Al Ahly (Egypt)	94–77	(Rwanda) REG
Scoring by quarter: 23–18, 23–14, 21–21, 27–24
Pts: Amin 22; Rebs: Amin, Fakuade 6 Asts: Amin 4		Pts: Filer 26; Rebs: Kambuy Manga 6 Asts: Filer 9

BK Arena, Kigali
Attendance: 6,423
Referees: Marcy Williams, Kalume Tonton Banza, Mbaye Seye

==== Stade Malien vs. Cape Town Tigers ====
This was the first competitive game between the two teams.

The Tigers were forced to play without Zaire Wade and Evans Ganapamo, who suffered from injuries. Stade Malien never trailed throughout the game, as they had already built a sixteen point advantage after the first quarter. Import player John Wilkins scored 16 points in the opening quarter. During the third quarter, Stade Malien led by as much as 22 points, but this lead was cut to just two with 41 seconds left on the clock. After this point, the Tigers turned over the ball three times, which were conversed to six points by Malien. Aliou Diarra had a double-double of 18 points and 13 rebounds, his sixth double-double in six BAL games. For the Tigers, it was their second consecutive elimination in the quarterfinals.

21 May 2023
19:00

Report

Stade Malien (Mali)	78–69	(South Africa) Cape Town Tigers
Scoring by quarter: 31–15, 17–15, 16–22, 14–17
Pts: Diarra, Wilkins 18; Rebs: Diarra 13; Asts: Foster 7		Pts: Prinsloo 19; Rebs: Gbinije 13; Asts: Gbinije 5

BK Arena, Kigali
Attendance: 3,632
Referees: Hortencia Sanchez-Carrizales, Jean Sauveur Ruhamiriza, Leslie Cherubin

==== AS Douanes vs. Ferroviário da Beira ====
This was the first competitive game between the two teams. AS Douanes defeated Ferroviário to seal its first semi-final appearance.

22 May 2023
17:00

Report
Livestats

AS Douanes (Senegal)	93–73	(Mozambique) Ferroviário da Beira
Scoring by quarter: 28–23, 24–14, 19–15, 22–21
Pts: Fall 23; Rebs: Bryan-Amaning 11; Asts: Ndour 8		Pts: Gueye 19; Rebs: Gueye 9 Asts: Perry 8

BK Arena, Kigali
Attendance: 2,240
Referees: JD Ralls, Banza Kalume, Sara Elsharnouby

==== Petro de Luanda vs. ABC Fighters ====
This was the first competitive game in the BAL between the two teams, and the third meeting ever. They met twice in the FIBA Africa Club Champions Cup, in the semi-final of the 2005 and in the group stage of the 2007.

22 May 2023
20:30

Report
Livestats

Petro de Luanda (Angola)	88–84	(Ivory Coast) ABC Fighters
Scoring by quarter: 23–16, 18–25, 23–22, 24–21
Pts: Morais 18; Rebs: Pedro 8 Asts: Diabate 5		Pts: Abada 21; Rebs: Three players 3 Asts: Abada 8

BK Arena, Kigali
Referees: Klyde Mulla, Yann Vezo Davidson, Mbaye Seye

=== Semi-finals ===
==== Petro de Luanda vs. AS Douanes ====
AS Douanes won the semi-final against Petro de Luanda, to become the first Senegalese team to reach the BAL final. Jean Jacques Boissy had 28 points and Chris Crawford scored 26. The Douanes led the majority of the game and won their fifth straight BAL game, after losing their two opening games in the Sahara Conference.

The win for Douanes was widely seen as a "shock" as unbeaten Petro de Luanda were considered the title favourites.

24 May 2023
17:00

Livestats

Petro de Luanda (Angola)	86–92	(Senegal) AS Douanes
Scoring by quarter: 19–20, 26–29, 18–20, 23–23
Pts: Hollis 19; Rebs: Pedro 8 Asts: Pedro 6		Pts: Boissy 28; Rebs: Crawford 7 Asts: Ndour 5

BK Arena, Kigali
Attendance: 4,554
Referees: Marcy Williams, Jean Sauveur Ruhamiriza, Mbaye Seye

==== Stade Malien vs. Al Ahly ====
Al Ahly became the second Egyptian team to advance to the BAL Final, despite trailing by five at the half to Stade Malien. Ehab Amin led the Red Devils with a game-high 21 points. Stade Malien's Aliou Diarra recorded his sixth straight double-double, but was fouled out two minutes before the end of the game.

24 May 2023
20:30

Livestats

Stade Malien (Mali)	73–78	(Egypt) Al Ahly
Scoring by quarter: 17–17, 21–16, 15–25, 20–20
Pts: Amayo 15; Rebs: Diarra 11; Asts: Foster 6		Pts: Amin 21; Rebs: Amin 6 Asts: Thompson 4

BK Arena, Kigali
Attendance: 6,102
Referees: Klyde Mulla, Jean Sauveur Ruhamiriza, Annie Joyce Muchenu

=== Third place game ===
Petro de Luanda played in its second third place game, having won the game in 2021. Stade Malien finished their surprising season by claiming the third place after pushing away from Petro in the final minutes of the game. Aliou Diarra had 25 points and 12 rebounds, his seventh double-double in as many games.

26 May 2023
18:00

Livestats

Petro de Luanda (Angola)	65–73	(Mali) Stade Malien
Scoring by quarter: 15–20, 19–16, 20–14, 11–23
Pts: Morais 15; Rebs: Morais 9 Asts: Morais, Diabate 4		Pts: Diarra 25; Rebs: Diarra 12; Asts: Three players 5

BK Arena, Kigali
Referees: Hortensia Sanchez-Carrizales, Marie Leslie Cherubin, Mbaye Seye

=== Final ===
27 May 2023
18:00

Livestats

Al Ahly (Egypt)	80–65	(Senegal) AS Douanes
Scoring by quarter: 17–10, 21–23, 25–13, 17–19
Scoring by half: 38–33, 42–32
Pts: Omot 22; Rebs: Fakuade 10; Asts: Seif 4		Pts: Boissy 20; Rebs: Ochereobia 9 Asts: Ndour 4

BK Arena, Kigali
Attendance: 7,532
Referees: JD Ralls, Yann Vezo Davidson, Arnold Moseya
