= Sahara Conference =

Conference of the Basketball Africa League

- League: Basketball Africa League
- Sport: Basketball
- Founded: 2022
- First season: 2022
- No. of teams: 4 (2024–present); 6 (2022–2023)
- Venue: Dakar Arena
- Most recent champion: (Tunisia) US Monastir (1st title) (2025)
- 2025 BAL season group phase#Sahara Conference

The Sahara Conference is one of the three conferences that make up the Basketball Africa League (BAL), the other two being the Nile Conference and the Kalahari Conference. All conferences currently consist of four teams.

The conference alignment began in the 2022 season, although plans to have conferences were already set up before the inaugural season. Named after the Sahara, the conference has been played at a single venue thus far, the Dakar Arena in Dakar, Senegal for the past two seasons.

== Venues ==
From 2022 to 2024, all games of the Sahara Conference were played at the Dakar Arena located in Dakar. (Note: Officially, the Dakar Arena is located in the town of Diamniadio.)

== Current standings ==
Pos	Team	Pld	W	L	PF	PA	PD	PCT	Qualification
1	(Tunisia) US Monastir	6	4	2	478	444	+34	.667	Advance to playoffs
2	(Angola) Petro de Luanda	6	3	3	463	432	+31	.500 (Note: Head-to-head: Petro de Luanda 1–1 Kriol Star, +26 point differential.)	Advance to playoffs
3	(Cape Verde) Kriol Star	6	3	3	461	506	−45	.500	Advance to playoffs
4	(Senegal) ASC Ville de Dakar (H)	6	2	4	425	445	−20	.333	

Source: BAL
Rules for classification: Tiebreakers
(H) Hosts

== Conference winners ==
Although no official trophy or title is awarded, the team ending at the top of the standings in the conference is lauded as "Conference winners" by the BAL.

Sahara Conference results
Season	Winners	Conference record	Playoffs result	Ref.
2022 (Details)	(Rwanda) REG (RWA)	4–1 (.800)	Lost in quarter-finals	
2023 (Details)	(Mali) Stade Malien (MLI)	3–2 (.600)	Won third place game	
2024 (Details)	(Nigeria) Rivers Hoopers (NGR)	4–2 (.667)	Won third place game	
2025 (Details)	(Tunisia) US Monastir (TUN)	4–2 (.667)	Lost in quarter-finals	

=== Titles by team ===
Team	Titles	Season(s) won
(Rwanda) REG	1	2022
(Mali) Stade Malien	1	2023
(Nigeria) Rivers Hoopers	1	2024
(Tunisia) US Monastir	1	2025

== Standings ==
^	Denotes team that won the BAL championship
^{+}	Denotes team that lost in the BAL finals
*	Denotes team that qualified for the BAL playoffs

Season	Positions (by team)					
Season	1st	2nd	3rd	4th	5th	6th
2022	REG* (4–1)	Monastir^ (4–1)	AS Salé* (3–2)	SLAC* (3–2)	Ferroviário (1–4)	DUC (1–4)
2023	Stade Malien* (3–2)	AS Douanes^{+} (3–2)	REG* (3–2)	ABC Fighters* (3–2)	Monastir (3–2)	Kwara Falcons (0–5)
2024	Rivers Hoopers* (4–2)	AS Douanes* (3–3)	US Monastir* (3–3)	APR (2–4)	–	
2025	US Monastir* (4–2)	Rivers Hoopers* (3–3)	Kriol Star* (3–3)	ASC Ville de Dakar (2–4)	–	
