= 2018–19 Africa Basketball League Group C =

Group C of the 2018–19 Africa Basketball League was the group stage of the 2018–19 Africa Basketball League for Al Ahly, Ferroviário da Beira, Primeiro de Agosto and REG BBC. Each team played each other once, for a total of three games per team, with all games played at the Prince Abdallah Al Faisal Sports Hall in Cairo. After all of the games were played, the two teams with the best records qualified for the final-eight round.

Primeiro de Agosto and Al Ahly finished 1st and 2nd respectively, thus qualifying to the Elite Eight stage.

== Standings ==
Pos	Team	Pld	W	L	GF	GA	GD	Pts	Qualification
1	(Angola) Primeiro de Agosto	3	3	0	243	196	+47	6	Advance to Elite 8
2	(Egypt) Al Ahly (H)	3	2	1	241	239	+2	5	Advance to Elite 8
3	(Rwanda) REG	3	1	2	226	225	+1	4	
4	(Mozambique) Ferroviário da Beira	3	0	3	209	259	−50	3	

Source: FIBA
(H) Hosts

All times are local UTC+2.

== Ferroviário vs REG BBC ==
Friday, 8 February 2019
18:00

Boxscore

Ferroviário da Beira (Mozambique)	77–86	(Rwanda) REG BBC
Scoring by quarter: 15-25, 19-23, 15-21, 28-17
Pts: Ubisse 19; Rebs: Ubisse 9 Asts: Jovanović 6		Pts: Beleck 25; Rebs: Beleck 13; Asts: Nkurunziza 5

Prince Abdallah Al Faisal Sports Hall, Cairo
Referees: Youssouf Maiga (MLI), Redouane Darif (MAR), Sami Belgharek (TUN)

== 1º de Agosto vs Al Ahly ==
Friday, 8 February 2019
20:30

Boxscore

1º de Agosto (Angola)	86–77	(Egypt) Al Ahly
Scoring by quarter: 20-16, 19-17, 29-20, 18-24
Pts: Mingas 18; Rebs: Mingas 12; Asts: Ndoniema 7		Pts: Holmes 27; Rebs: Holmes 11; Asts: Behiry 6

Prince Abdallah Al Faisal Sports Hall, Cairo
Referees: Tonton Kalume (COD), Mathurin N'guessan (CIV), Sofiane Youcef (ALG)

== 1º de Agosto vs REG BBC ==
Saturday, 9 February 2019
18:00

Boxscore

1º de Agosto (Angola)	70–64	(Rwanda) REG BBC
Scoring by quarter: 13-19, 27-14, 16-15, 14-16
Pts: Islando 26; Rebs: Islando 8 Asts: Gildo 7		Pts: Shyaka 15; Rebs: Gasana 11; Asts: Ali 5

Prince Abdallah Al Faisal Sports Hall, Cairo
Referees: Sofiane Youcef (ALG), Tonton Kalume (COD), Alioune Fall (SEN)

== Al Ahly vs Ferroviário ==
Saturday, 9 February 2019
20:30

Boxscore

Al Ahly (Egypt)	86–77	(Mozambique) Ferroviário da Beira
Scoring by quarter: 13-25, 22-23, 27-12, 24-17
Pts: Holmes 23; Rebs: O'Brien 8 Asts: Abouelnasr 7		Pts: Opong 20; Rebs: Opong 13; Asts: Nurmamade 5

Prince Abdallah Al Faisal Sports Hall, Cairo
Referees: Mathurin N'guessan (CIV), Youssouf Maiga (MLI), Redouane Darif (MAR)

== Ferroviário vs 1º de Agosto ==
Sunday, 10 February 2019
18:00

Boxscore

Ferroviário da Beira (Mozambique)	55–87	(Angola) 1º de Agosto
Scoring by quarter: 15-24, 10-21, 16-24, 14-18
Pts: Munguambe 15; Rebs: Opong 11; Asts: Nurmamade 5		Pts: Bastos 20; Rebs: Bastos 6 Asts: Quezada 5

Prince Abdallah Al Faisal Sports Hall, Cairo
Referees: Redouane Darif (MAR), Sami Belgharek (TUN), Mathurin N'guessan (CIV)

== REG BBC vs Al Ahly ==
Sunday, 10 February 2019
20:30

Boxscore

REG BBC (Rwanda)	76–78	(Egypt) Al Ahly
Scoring by quarter: 19-14, 22-25, 23-20, 12-19
Pts: Gasana 29; Rebs: Beleck 8 Asts: Beleck 5		Pts: Holmes 25; Rebs: O'Brien 8 Asts: Gunady 4

Prince Abdallah Al Faisal Sports Hall, Cairo
Referees: Tonton Kalume (COD), Sofiane Youcef (ALG), Alioune Fall (SEN)
