= Prince Ibeh =

American-Rwandan basketball player (born 1994)

Free agent
- Position: Center

Personal information
- Born: June 3, 1994 (age 32) London, England
- Listed height: 6 ft 10 in (2.08 m)
- Listed weight: 243 lb (110 kg)

Career information
- High school: Naaman Forest (Garland, Texas)
- College: Texas (2012–2016)
- NBA draft: 2016: undrafted
- Playing career: 2016–present

Career history
- 2017–2018: Long Island Nets
- 2018–2019: Yokohama B-Corsairs
- 2019: NorthPort Batang Pier
- 2019–2020: Hamburg Towers
- 2020–2021: Plymouth Raiders
- 2021: Patriots
- 2021: Club Atlético Aguada
- 2021–2022: New Taipei CTBC DEA
- 2022: Club Trouville
- 2022: NorthPort Batang Pier
- 2022–2023: TaiwanBeer HeroBears
- 2023: Guaros de Lara
- 2023: APR
- 2023–2024: Meralco Bolts
- 2024: Peñarol
- 2024: Taipei Fubon Braves
- 2024: El Calor de Cancún
- 2024: Patriots

Career highlights
- SPB Defensive Player of the Year (2023); Big 12 Defensive Player of the Year (2016)
- Stats at Basketball Reference

Prince Chinenye Ibeh (born June 3, 1994) is an American-Rwandan professional basketball player who last played for the Patriots of the Rwanda Basketball League.

== College career ==
Ibeh played college basketball at Texas from 2012 to 2016. Ibeh scored 17 points, grabbed 10 rebounds and blocked five shots in a 71–54 win over TCU on January 26, 2016. As a senior, he stepped into a bigger role due to an injury to Cameron Ridley. He averaged 4.1 points, 5.0 rebounds, and 2.0 blocks per game, shooting 57.8 percent. He was named the 2016 Big 12 Defensive Player of the Year and was selected to the Big 12 All-Defensive Team.

== Professional career ==
=== Long Island Nets (2017–2018) ===
The Long Island Nets, the NBA Development League affiliate of the Brooklyn Nets, signed Ibeh in February 2017. In his second game with the Nets, Ibeh recorded 3 points and 6 rebounds in almost 15 minutes of playing time against the Raptors 905.

=== Yokohama (2018–2019) ===
After his tenure with the Long Island Nets, Ibeh signed with the Yokohama B-Corsairs of the B.League. On January 5, 2019, Ibeh recorded his first career double-double after recording 12 points and 10 rebounds in a 106–99 win over the Nagoya Diamond Dolphins. In 18 games played with Yokohama, he averaged 4.7 points, 7.8 rebounds and 2.8 blocks.

=== NorthPort Batang Pier (2019) ===
For the 2019 Commissioners' Cup, the NorthPort Batang Pier tapped Ibeh as their import. In his PBA debut, Ibeh recorded 19 points, 13 rebounds and 3 steals in a 103–81 win over the Alaska Aces. Three days later, Ibeh recorded 15 points, 19 rebounds and 6 blocks in a 83–79 win over the import-less NLEX Road Warriors. Despite his stellar performance, Ibeh was criticized for his woeful free throw shooting as he shot 1-for-12 from the free throw line in that win. He recorded 18 points, 20 rebounds and 3 blocks in a 110–86 win over the TNT Katropa.

=== Hamburg Towers (2019–2020) ===
On July 30, 2019, Ibeh signed with the Hamburg Towers of the Basketball Bundesliga. In 15 games, he averaged 5.9 points, 4.1 rebounds, and 1.7 blocks per game.

=== Plymouth Raiders (2020–2021) ===
On October 26, 2020, Ibeh signed with the Plymouth Raiders of the British Basketball League. In April 2021, Ibeh left the team.

=== Patriots (2021) ===
In May 2021, Ibeh joined the Rwandan team Patriots BBC to play in the 2021 BAL season. In six games, he averaged 7.8 points, 5.7 rebounds, 1.3 assists, and 1.2 blocks per game.

=== Club Atlético Aguada (2021) ===
On September 3, 2021, Ibeh signed with Club Atlético Aguada of the Liga Uruguaya de Básquetbol.

=== New Taipei CTBC DEA (2021–2022) ===
On October 14, 2021, Ibeh signed with New Taipei CTBC DEA of the T1 League.

=== Trouville (2022) ===
On March 15, 2022, Ibeh signed with Club Trouville of the Liga Uruguaya de Básquetbol.

=== Second stint with NorthPort Batang Pier (2022) ===
In August 2022, Ibeh signed again with the NorthPort Batang Pier of the Philippine Basketball Association (PBA) as the team's import for the 2022–23 PBA Commissioner's Cup.

=== TaiwanBeer HeroBears (2022–2023) ===
On December 14, 2022, Ibeh signed with TaiwanBeer HeroBears of the T1 League. On March 6, 2023, the team terminated the Ibeh's contract.

=== Guaros de Lara (2023) ===
On March 17, 2023, Guaros de Lara from Venezuela announced they had acquired Ibeh. He was named the Superliga Profesional de Baloncesto Defensive Player of the Year.

=== APR (2023) ===
In August 2023, Ibeh joined APR in Rwanda.

=== Meralco Bolts (2023) ===
In October 2023, he signed with the Meralco Bolts of the Philippine Basketball Association (PBA) as one of the team's import for its participation in the 2023–24 East Asia Super League.

=== Peñarol (2024) ===
In January 2024, Ibeh joined Peñarol of the Liga Uruguaya de Básquetbol. In four appearances, he averaged two points, 5.5 rebounds, and 2.3 blocks per game.

=== Taipei Fubon Braves (2024) ===
In February 2024, Ibeh signed with Homenetmen Beirut in Lebanon.

In March 2024, Ibeh signed with Taipei Fubon Braves of the P. League+.

=== El Calor de Cancún (2024) ===
In June 2024, Ibeh joined El Calor de Cancún, an expansion team in the Liga Nacional de Baloncesto Profesional.

=== Patriots (2024) ===
In August 2024, Ibeh rejoined Patriots of the Rwanda Basketball League.

On December 6, 2024, Ibeh joined the Dewa United Banten of the Indonesian Basketball League. On December 25, his contract was terminated due to injury, replacing by Malik Dime.

== National team career ==
In February 2021, Ibeh was added to the roster of the Rwandan national basketball team. He played in two games for the AfroBasket 2021 qualifiers and averaged 11 points.

== Career statistics ==
Legend
GP	Games played	MPG	Minutes per game	FG%	Field goal percentage
3P%	3-point field goal percentage	FT%	Free throw percentage	RPG	Rebounds per game
APG	Assists per game	SPG	Steals per game	BPG	Blocks per game
PPG	Points per game	**Bold**	Career high		Led the league

=== Domestic leagues ===
Year	Team	League	GP	MPG	FG%	3P%	FT%	RPG	APG	SPG	BPG	PPG
2016–17	Long Island Nets	NBA G League	10	9.7	.211	.000	**.600**	2.0	.1	.1	.9	1.1
2017–18	Long Island Nets	NBA G League	**32**	11.0	.571	.000	.216	2.9	.2	.3	1.4	15.9
2018–19	Yokohama B-Corsairs	B.League	18	26.3	.432	.000	.167	7.8	.6	.9	2.8	4.8
2018–19	NorthPort Batang Pier	PBA	13	**37.9**	.625	.000	.274	**15.9**	**1.2**	**1.3**	**4.0**	**13.7**
2019–20	Hamburg Towers	Bundesliga	15	17.9	**.661**	.000	.294	4.1	.5	.1	1.7	5.9
2020–21	Plymouth Raiders	BBL	17	21.1	.532	.000	.366	7.0	.6	.2	1.8	6.8
Career			105	19.4	.545	.000	.277	6.1	.5	.5	2.0	5.5

=== BAL statistics ===
Year	Team	GP	GS	MPG	FG%	3P%	FT%	RPG	APG	SPG	BPG	PPG
2021	Patriots	6	4	20.2	.538	–	.263	5.7	1.3	.3	1.3	7.8
Career		6	4	20.2	.538	–	.263	5.7	1.3	.3	1.3	7.8
