= Mangok Mathiang =

South Sudanese-Australian basketball player

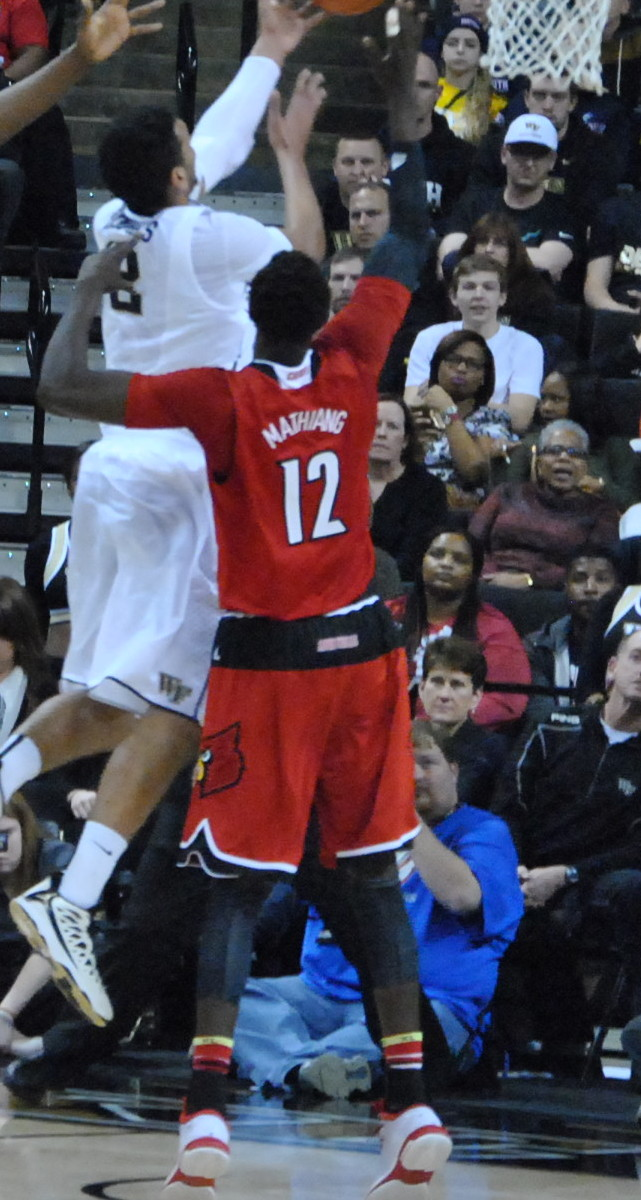
- Mathiang with Louisville in 2015

No. 7 – Adelaide 36ers
- Position: Power forward / center
- League: NBL

Personal information
- Born: 8 October 1992 (age 34) Juba, Sudan (now South Sudan)
- Listed height: 208 cm (6 ft 10 in)
- Listed weight: 102 kg (225 lb)

Career information
- High school: Emmanuel College (Melbourne, Victoria); Brehm Preparatory (Carbondale, Illinois); IMG Academy (Bradenton, Florida)
- College: Louisville (2013–2017)
- NBA draft: 2017: undrafted
- Playing career: 2017–present

Career history
- 2017–2018: Charlotte Hornets
- 2017–2018: →Greensboro Swarm
- 2018–2019: Vanoli Cremona
- 2019–2020: Bahçeşehir Koleji
- 2022: Casey Cavaliers
- 2022–2023: Illawarra Hawks
- 2023: Hapoel Eilat
- 2023–2024: New Zealand Breakers
- 2024: Maccabi Ironi Ramat Gan
- 2024–2025: Ningbo Rockets
- 2025: Daegu KOGAS Pegasus
- 2025–2026: Beijing Ducks
- 2026: APR BBC
- 2026: RSSB Tigers
- 2026–present: Adelaide 36ers

Career highlights
- BAL champion (2026); Slovenian League champion (2021); Italian Cup winner (2019); All-BAL First Team (2026); BAL Defensive Player of the Year (2026); BAL All-Defensive Team (2026)
- Stats at NBA.com
- Stats at Basketball Reference

Mangok Mathiang (born 8 October 1992) is a South Sudanese-Australian professional basketball player for the Adelaide 36ers of the National Basketball League (NBL). He played college basketball for the University of Louisville.

== Early life and high school career ==
Mathiang was born in Juba in what is now South Sudan, in central Africa. At the age of five, he, his mother, and five siblings fled war-torn Sudan and moved to Egypt (which Mathiang described as "not that much better than Sudan"), to set up a move to Australia. His father, Alfret, decided to stay behind in Sudan.

Mathiang and the rest of his family arrived in Sydney, Australia, with extended family members when he was seven years old, before moving to Melbourne, Australia, a year later, where he then lived for several years. Until he was 16 years old, Mathiang played Australian rules football, rugby, track, and soccer for Emmanuel College in the Melbourne suburb of Altona North. However, due to him being 1.98m tall, he was encouraged to start playing basketball instead. He moved to the United States with his friend, Ran Tut, to achieve that goal.

During his junior year of high school in 2010–11, he played basketball for Brehm Preparatory School in Carbondale, Illinois. After that, Mathiang moved to Bradenton, Florida to play his senior season in 2011–12 at the IMG Academy. In his senior season, he averaged 14 points, 10 rebounds, and 4 blocks per game as he helped the IMG Academy get a 28–2 record. While Mathiang also received offers from Kansas State University, University of Georgia, Mississippi State University, Auburn University, and Central Michigan University, he ultimately chose to go to the University of Louisville for the people there.

== College career ==
He originally was with the Louisville Cardinals during the 2012–13 season, but due to NCAA regulations relating to international players like Mathaing, he was forced to sit out his first season with the team. Despite that, he still traveled and trained with the team throughout the season, all the way into the 2013 NCAA Championship Game, where the Cardinals won their third NCAA Tournament. Throughout his NCAA career, Mathiang mostly played as a bench reserve for over 114 career games, usually alternating spots as a starter at times for Louisville. In his freshman season, he was seventh in the AAC in blocked shots per game (1.4). In his sophomore season, he was sixth in the ACC in blocked shots per game (1.4).

During his junior season, when he was team captain for the second straight season, he was limited to playing in only 10 games total due to his breaking the fifth metatarsal in his left foot which sidelined him for the majority of that season, and he averaged 7.1 points and 5.7 rebounds in 18.8 minutes of action per game. As a result of when the injury came about, he was not deemed eligible for another redshirt season that year. His best season was his senior year with Louisville, when he averaged 7.8 points and 6.0 rebounds in 20.8 minutes of action per game in 33 games played. He was on the ACC All-Academic Team in 2015 and 2016.

== Professional career ==
=== Charlotte Hornets and Greensboro Swarm (2017–2018) ===
After going undrafted in the 2017 NBA draft, Mathiang played for the Charlotte Hornets during the 2017 NBA Summer League. On 2 August 2017, he signed a two-way contract with the Hornets. Under the terms of the deal, he split the 2017–18 season with the Hornets and their NBA G League affiliate, the Greensboro Swarm. He played just 20 minutes at the NBA level, but became the fifth Sudanese-born player to appear in an NBA game, joining Manute Bol, Deng Gai, Luol Deng, and Thon Maker. He spent most of his time in the G League. There, with the Swarm, he averaged 10.8 points, 9.2 rebounds, and 1.4 blocks in 25.3 minutes per game.

Mathiang re-joined the Hornets for the 2018 NBA Summer League. He was waived by Charlotte on 15 August 2018.

=== Guerino Vanoli Basket (2018–2019) ===
On 22 August 2018, Mathiang signed with Vanoli Cremona of the Lega Basket Serie A. He averaged 11.3 points and 10.2 rebounds per game. Cremona went to win its first Italian Cup ever by beating New Basket Brindisi 83–74 in the Finals.

=== Bahçeşehir Koleji (2019–2020) ===
On 11 July 2019, Mathiang signed with Bahçeşehir Koleji of the Turkish Basketbol Süper Ligi (BSL). He averaged 12.7 points and 10.6 rebounds per game.

Mathiang was set to play for Cedevita Olimpija of the ABA League in the 2020–21 season, but later missed the whole season after sustaining a right leg injury in practice that required surgery. He re-signed with Cedevita Olimpija in May 2021, but was let go in August 2021 after the injury worsened.

=== Illawarra Hawks (2022–2023) ===
After a four-game stint with the Casey Cavaliers of the NBL1 South during the 2022 NBL1 season, Mathiang signed with the Illawarra Hawks of the National Basketball League on 29 July 2022. He parted ways with the Hawks on 26 January 2023 to take up a playing opportunity overseas. He averaged 7.7 points, 5.1 rebounds, and 1.0 blocks (6th in the league) in 25 games during the 2022–23 NBL season.

=== Hapoel Eilat (2023) ===
On 29 January 2023, Mathiang signed with Hapoel Eilat of the Israeli Basketball Premier League.

=== New Zealand Breakers (2023–2024) ===
On 13 June 2023, Mathiang signed with the New Zealand Breakers for the 2023–24 NBL season.

=== Maccabi Ironi Ramat Gan] (2024) ===
On 11 March 2024, Mathiang signed with Maccabi Ironi Ramat Gan of the Israeli Basketball Premier League.

=== Ningbo Rockets (2024–2025) ===
On 26 September 2024, Mathiang signed with the Ningbo Rockets of the Chinese Basketball Association (CBA).

=== Daegu KOGAS Pegasus (2025) ===
In April 2025, Mathiang joined the Daegu KOGAS Pegasus of the Korean Basketball League (KBL) for the 2025 playoffs, replacing Youssou Ndoye. He returned to Daegu for the 2025–26 season but was released in late October 2025.

=== Beijing Ducks (2025–2026) ===
In December 2025, Mathiang joined the Beijing Ducks of the Chinese Basketball Association.

=== Rwanda (2026) ===
In March 2026, Mathiang had a one-game stint with APR BBC of the Rwanda Basketball League. Later that month, he joined RSSB Tigers for the 2026 BAL season. He helped RSSB Tigers win the BAL championship. He averaged 17 points and 15 rebounds and was named Defensive Player of the Year.

=== Adelaide 36ers (2026–present) ===
On 21 October 2026, Mathiang signed with the Adelaide 36ers for the rest of the 2026–27 NBL season.

== National team career ==
Mathiang played for the Australian national team during the 2019 FIBA Basketball World Cup Asian qualifiers.

In August 2023, Mathiang was named in the South Sudan national team for the 2023 FIBA Basketball World Cup. He did not play in the 2023 World Cup.

Mathiang debuted for South Sudan during the 2027 FIBA Basketball World Cup African qualifiers.

== Career statistics ==
Legend
| GP | Games played | GS | Games started | MPG | Minutes per game |
| FG% | Field goal percentage | 3P% | 3-point field goal percentage | FT% | Free throw percentage |
| RPG | Rebounds per game | APG | Assists per game | SPG | Steals per game |
| BPG | Blocks per game | PPG | Points per game | **Bold** | Career high |

=== NBA ===
==== Regular season ====
| Year | Team | GP | GS | MPG | FG% | 3P% | FT% | RPG | APG | SPG | BPG | PPG |
|---|---|---|---|---|---|---|---|---|---|---|---|---|
| 2017–18 | Charlotte | 4 | 0 | 5.0 | .571 | – | .000 | 2.5 | .0 | .3 | .0 | 2.0 |
| Career | | 4 | 0 | 5.0 | .571 | – | .000 | 2.5 | .0 | .3 | .0 | 2.0 |

=== College ===
| Year | Team | GP | GS | MPG | FG% | 3P% | FT% | RPG | APG | SPG | BPG | PPG |
|---|---|---|---|---|---|---|---|---|---|---|---|---|
| 2013–14 | Louisville | **37** | 14 | 14.7 | .528 | – | .619 | 3.6 | .4 | .4 | **1.4** | 3.6 |
| 2014–15 | Louisville | 34 | 9 | 18.7 | .388 | – | .481 | 4.7 | .5 | .6 | **1.4** | 2.6 |
| 2015–16 | Louisville | 10 | 2 | 18.8 | **.563** | – | .586 | 5.7 | .5 | **.7** | 1.2 | 7.1 |
| 2016–17 | Louisville | 33 | **19** | **20.8** | .531 | – | **.671** | **6.0** | **.7** | .5 | 1.1 | **7.8** |
| Career | | 114 | 44 | 18.0 | .506 | – | .599 | 4.8 | .5 | .5 | 1.3 | 4.8 |
