= Rwanda men's national basketball team =

Rwanda
- FIBA ranking: 84 ▼2 (1 September 2026)
- Joined FIBA: 1977
- FIBA zone: FIBA Africa
- National federation: Rwandan Basketball Federation (FERWABA)
- Coach: Cheikh Sarr

FIBA World Cup
- Appearances: 0

AfroBasket
- Appearances: 7

AfroCan
- Appearances: 2
- Medals: (bronze) Bronze: (2023)
Home	Away

Rwanda men's national basketball team is a basketball team that represents Rwanda in international competitions. It is administered by the Rwandan Basketball Federation (FERWABA) Rwanda has yet to qualify for the FIBA Basketball World Cup, but has qualified for the AfroBasket six times.

Before 2000, Team Rwanda was virtually unknown to most basketball fans worldwide. Since the mid-2000s however, the team slowly but surely has made a name for itself. Team Rwanda has emerged as a major force in East Africa and has qualified for the AfroBasket, Africa's prime basketball event, four times in a row between 2007 and 2013.

At the AfroBasket 2021 on home soil, Rwanda beat Angola, winner of ten AfroBasket editions between 1989 and 2013. The victory was considered an enormous achievement of the national team.

Rwanda won a bronze medal at the 2023 FIBA AfroCan in Angola, the first ever podium finish in the country's history.

== Competitive record ==
=== Basketball World Cup ===
Year	Round	Position	GP	W	L
(Argentina) 1950	Not a FIBA member				
(Brazil) 1954	Not a FIBA member				
(Chile) 1959	Not a FIBA member				
(Brazil) 1963	Not a FIBA member				
(Uruguay) 1967	Not a FIBA member				
(Socialist Federal Republic of Yugoslavia) 1970	Not a FIBA member				
(Puerto Rico) 1974	Not a FIBA member				
(Philippines) 1978	Not a FIBA member				
(Colombia) 1982	Did not enter				
(Spain) 1986	Did not enter				
(Argentina) 1990	Did not enter				
(Canada) 1994	Did not enter				
(Greece) 1998	Did not enter				
(United States) 2002	Did not enter				
(Japan) 2006	Did not qualify				
(Turkey) 2010	Did not qualify				
(Spain) 2014	Did not qualify				
(China) 2019	Did not qualify				
(Philippines) (Japan) (Indonesia) 2023	Did not qualify				
(Qatar) 2027	Did not qualify				
(France) 2031	To be determined				
Total	0/7		0	0	0

=== AfroBasket ===
Year	Round	Position	GP	W	L
(Senegal) 1978	Did not qualify				
(Morocco) 1980	Did not qualify				
(Somalia) 1981	Did not qualify				
(Egypt) 1983	Did not qualify				
(Ivory Coast) 1985	Did not qualify				
(Tunisia) 1987	Did not qualify				
(Angola) 1989	Did not qualify				
(Egypt) 1992	Did not qualify				
(Kenya) 1993	Did not qualify				
(Algeria) 1995	Did not qualify				
(Senegal) 1997	Did not qualify				
(Angola) 1999	Did not qualify				
(Morocco) 2001	Did not qualify				
(Egypt) 2003	Did not qualify				
(Algeria) 2005	Did not qualify				
(Angola) 2007	Classification rounds	12th	6	1	5
(Libya) 2009	Classification rounds	9th	8	5	3
(Madagascar) 2011	Round of 16	12th	5	1	4
(Ivory Coast) 2013	Round of 16	10th	5	1	4
(Tunisia) 2015	Did not qualify				
(Tunisia) (Senegal) 2017	Preliminary round	10th	3	1	2
(Rwanda) 2021	Round of 16	10th	4	2	2
(Angola) 2025	Preliminary round	13th	3	0	3
Total	7/23		34	11	23

Note: Red border denotes that the tournament was held on home soil.

=== FIBA AfroCan ===
Year	Round	Position	GP	W	L
(Mali) 2019	Did not qualify				
(Angola) 2023	3rd place	3rd	6	3	3
(Rwanda) 2027	Qualified as host				
Total	Third place	2/3	6	2	3

=== African Games ===
Year	Round	Position	GP	W	L
(Mozambique) 2011	Quarter-finals	7th	7	2	5
(Republic of the Congo) 2015	Did not qualify				
Total			7	2	5

== Team ==
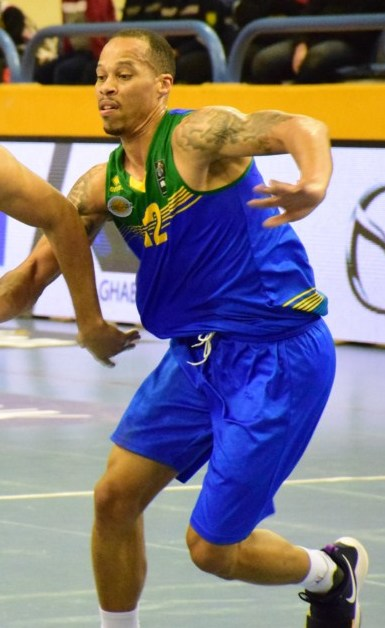
Kenny Gasana playing for the Rwandan national team in 2017

=== Current roster ===
Roster for the AfroBasket 2025.

Rwanda national basketball team roster
Players
Coaches

Pos.	No.	Name	Age – Date of birth	Height	Club	Ctr.
SG	0	David Mutabazi	23 – 20 January 2002	1.86 m (6 ft 1 in)	Tigers	(Rwanda)
PF	1	Cadeau de Dieu Furaha	27 – 10 June 1998	2.01 m (6 ft 7 in)	Patriots	(Rwanda)
PG	2	Prince Tokoza Twa	21 – 7 April 2004	1.80 m (5 ft 11 in)	APR	(Rwanda)
SF	3	Bruno Shema	23 – 24 July 2002	2.02 m (6 ft 8 in)	Tigers	(Rwanda)
SF	6	William Robeyns	29 – 23 February 1996	1.91 m (6 ft 3 in)	APR	(Rwanda)
PF	9	Trey Sinze Twa	25 – 12 January 2000	1.95 m (6 ft 5 in)	APR	(Rwanda)
PF	13	Paul Bizima	22 – 23 March 2003	1.98 m (6 ft 6 in)	Tigers	(Rwanda)
PG	15	Ntore Habimana	27 – 15 August 1997	1.96 m (6 ft 5 in)	APR	(Rwanda)
SF	20	Hason Ward	24 – 24 September 2000	2.06 m (6 ft 9 in)	Scarborough Shooting Stars	(Canada)
SG	23	Steven Hagumintwari	31 – 1 October 1993	1.93 m (6 ft 4 in)	Patriots	(Rwanda)
SF	24	Prince Muhizi	29 – 19 January 1996		REG	(Rwanda)
PF	34	Dieudonné Ndizeye (C)	29 – 14 October 1995	1.98 m (6 ft 6 in)	Patriots	(Rwanda)

Head coach

- (Senegal) Cheikh Sarr

Assistant coach(es)

- (Rwanda) Yves Murenzi
- (Rwanda) Sunny Niyomugabo

Legend

- (C) Team captain
- Club – describes last
  club before the tournament
- Age – describes age
  on 12 August 2025

=== Head coach position ===
- (Croatia) Većeslav Kavedžija – 2007–2011
- (Rwanda) Moise Mutokambali – 2012–2013, 2014–2017
- (Senegal) Cheikh Sarr – 2021–present

=== Past rosters ===
Team for the 2013 FIBA Africa Championship.

2013 FIBA Africa Championship

Rwanda men's national basketball team roster
Players
Coaches

Pos.	No.	Name	Age – Date of birth	Height	Club
	4	Olivier Shyaka	18 – 14 August 1995		Espoir BC
SF	5	Patrice Twagirayezu	19 – 5 July 1994	2.00 m (6 ft 7 in)	Asheville Christian Academy
F/C	6	Thierry Suku Suku	24 – 12 July 1989	1.90 m (6 ft 3 in)
G	7	Lionel Hakizimana	20 – 13 December 1992	1.90 m (6 ft 3 in)	Espoir BC
G	8	Aristide Mugabe	25 – 11 February 1988	1.83 m (6 ft 0 in)	Espoir BC
G	9	Aboubakar Barame	29 – 26 April 1984	1.80 m (5 ft 11 in)	Espoir BC
F	10	Hamza Ruhezamihigo	28 – 27 March 1985	1.95 m (6 ft 5 in)	Riviere des Prairies Jaguars
F	11	Cameroun Bradley	22 – 27 February 1991	1.96 m (6 ft 5 in)	Espoir BC
F	12	Kenneth Gasana	28 – 9 November 1984	1.97 m (6 ft 6 in)	Chabab Rif Al Hoceima
F	13	Daniel Rugamba	26 – 16 March 1987	1.95 m (6 ft 5 in)	CSK Basket-Ball Club
C	14	Kami Kabangu	29 – 2 July 1984	2.03 m (6 ft 8 in)	Espoir BC

Head coach

- Moise Mutokambali

Legend

- Club – describes last
  club before the tournament
- Age – describes age
  on 20 August 2013

At AfroBasket 2015 qualification:

AfroBasket 2015 qualification

Rwanda men's national basketball team roster
Players
Coaches

Pos.	No.	Name	Age – Date of birth	Height	Club
		Aboubakar Ally Barame	31 – 26 April 1984		Espoir BC	(Rwanda)
		Cameroun Curtis Bradley	24 – 27 February 1991	1.96 m (6 ft 5 in)	Michiana Monarch	(United States)
G		Kenneth Gasana	30 – 9 November 1984	1.97 m (6 ft 6 in)	Al Gezira Cairo	(Egypt)
		Nicolas Frédéric Robert Gihana	30 – 24 March 1985
		Pacifique Habyarimana	19 – 16 August 1996			(Rwanda)
		Steven Hagumintwari	21 – 1 October 1993			(Rwanda)
		Lionel Hakizimana	22 – 13 December 1992	1.90 m (6 ft 3 in)	Espoir BC	(Rwanda)
		Parfait Ishimwe	20 – 28 May 1995			(Rwanda)
		Kami Kabangu	31 – 2 July 1984	2.03 m (6 ft 8 in)	Espoir BC	(Rwanda)
		Elie Kaje	20 – 17 March 1995			(Rwanda)
		Pascal Karekezi Rurangirwa	20 – 1 December 1994			(Rwanda)
		Ali Kubwimana Kazingufu	19 – 29 December 1995			(Rwanda)
		Dan Manzi	19 – 2 October 1995			(Rwanda)
		Nestor Ernest Manzi	20 – 4 December 1994			(Rwanda)
		Aristide Mugabe (C)	27 – 11 February 1988	1.83 m (6 ft 0 in)	Espoir BC	(Rwanda)
		Olivier Muhizi	27 – 20 March 1988	1.98 m (6 ft 6 in)		(Rwanda)
		Niyomugabo Sunny Munyandamutsa	20 – 1 October 1994
		Jean Paul Ndoli	20 – 30 April 1995			(Rwanda)
		Hamza Ruhezamihigo	30 – 27 March 1985	1.93 m (6 ft 4 in)	Rivière des Prairies Jaguars	(Canada)
		Jean-Paul Adonis Rwabigwi	20 – 9 June 1995
		Olivier Shyaka	20 – 14 August 1995	1.94 m (6 ft 4 in)	Kigali BC	(Rwanda)
		Thierry Suku Suku	26 – 12 July 1989	1.94 m (6 ft 4 in)	ASS Lagnieu	(France)
SF	5	Patrice Twagirayezu	21 – 5 July 1994	2.00 m (6 ft 7 in)	Asheville Christian Academy	(United States)

Head coach

- (Rwanda) Moise Mutokambali

Legend

- Club – describes last
  club before the tournament
- Age – describes age
  on 19 August 2015

== Kit ==
=== Manufacturer ===
2013 – Nike

2017–present Erreà

== See also ==
- Rwanda national under-19 basketball team
- Rwanda national under-17 basketball team
- Rwanda women's national basketball team
- Rwanda national 3x3 team
