= Kubwimana Kazingufu Ali =

Rwandan basketball player (born 1995)

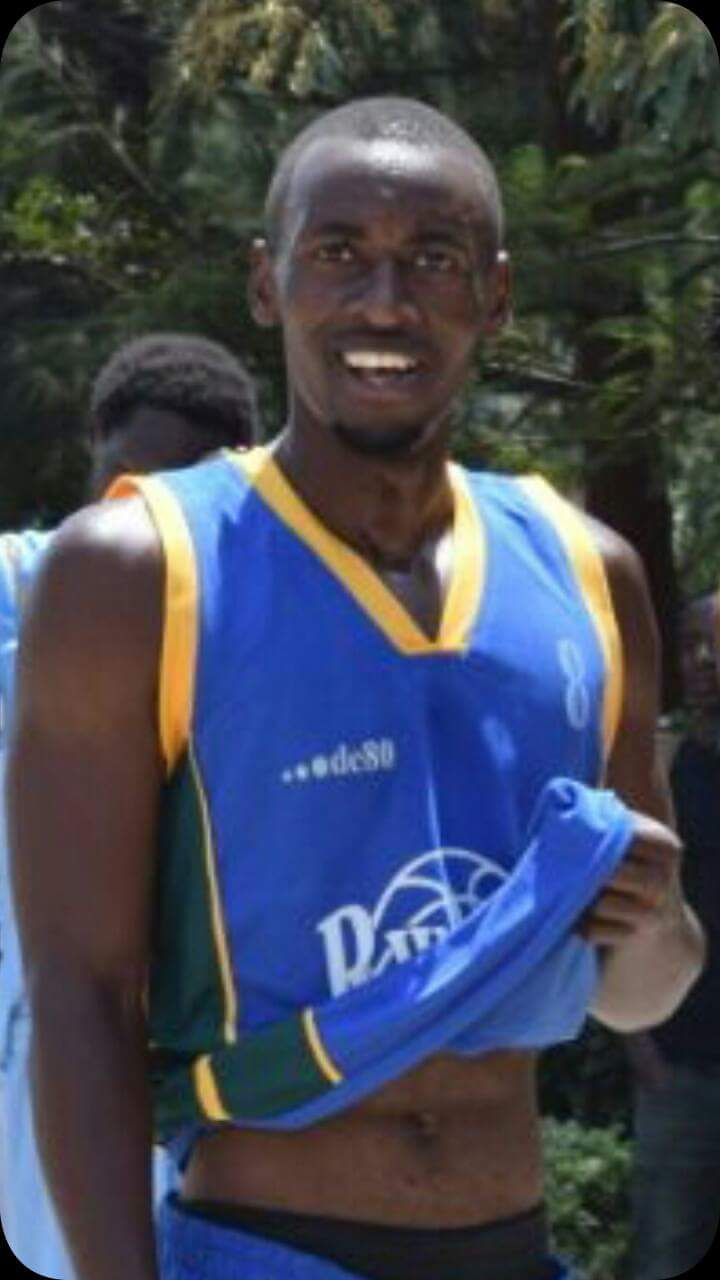
- Kubwimana in a match against KBC in 2014

REG BBC
- Position: Point guard
- League: NBL

Personal information
- Born: 29 December 1995 (age 30) Gisenyi, Rwanda
- Listed height: 180 cm (5 ft 11 in)

Career information
- Playing career: 2011–present

Career history
- 2011–2014: KBC
- 2014–2018: Patriots
- 2018–present: REG

Kubwimana Kazingufu Ali (born 29 December 1995) is a Rwandan professional basketball player for REG and Rwanda. Standing at 1.80 m (5 ft 11 in), he plays as point guard.

== Early life ==
Ali was born in Rubavu (Western province). He and his four siblings are children of local business people Kazingufu Jean and Uwamariya Marie. His little brother and sister are also into basketball and they consider him as an inspiration. He has studied at Stella Maris, a well-known local primary school; pursued his Ordinary level at ESEGI in Rubavu, then completed high school in History Economics and Geography (HEG) combinations at College APE Rugunga, in Kigali. He is currently completing his bachelor's degree in Business Management at the University of Tourism and Business (UTB) in Kigali.

Ali is a point guard mostly known for his speed, as some fans often call him "Homme à quatre poumons" (Man with 4 lungs); he can alsobe deployed as a Shooting Guard, and is an excellent three point shooter. He has played with several other well known professionals such as Shime (point guard at IPRC Kigali Basketball club); Sani Eric (center at IPRC South Basketball club) and Marc Rushagaza (Shooting Guard at Patriots BBC).

== Basketball career ==
Ali started playing basketball as a hobby when he was 12, played within the school basketball team as he went to high school then in 2008; he joined the Marine Basketball Club juniors where they got the opportunity to train with the club's seniors at times.

=== Professional career ===
During a local interschool championship in 2011, Ali was noticed by the Kigali Basketball Club (KBC) President Rutajogerwa Callixte. He recommended Ali to the team's Coach Kalima Cyril who welcomed him in the club that same year.

=== KGC ===
After he joined KBC in his official debut he had 22 points, 7 assists, 4 rebounds and 6 steals. Ali helped the team win the 2012 championship pre-season and came second during the FIBA Africa Zone 5 championship and that same year,

He was among the selectees representing team Rwanda in the EAC Military Games where they won the gold medal.

In 2013, Ali received the Improved Player award by the Rwandan Basketball Federation (FERWABA) with averages of 23.6 points, 3.8 rebounds, 3.1 assists and 4.4 steals per game.

=== Patriots BBC ===
He left KBC in 2014, and then joined the Patriots Basketball Club where he currently plays. In October 2015; he was selected for the 3 on 3 Rwandan team during FIBA Zone 5 championship where the team won Ali was awarded the Best Three Point Shooter.

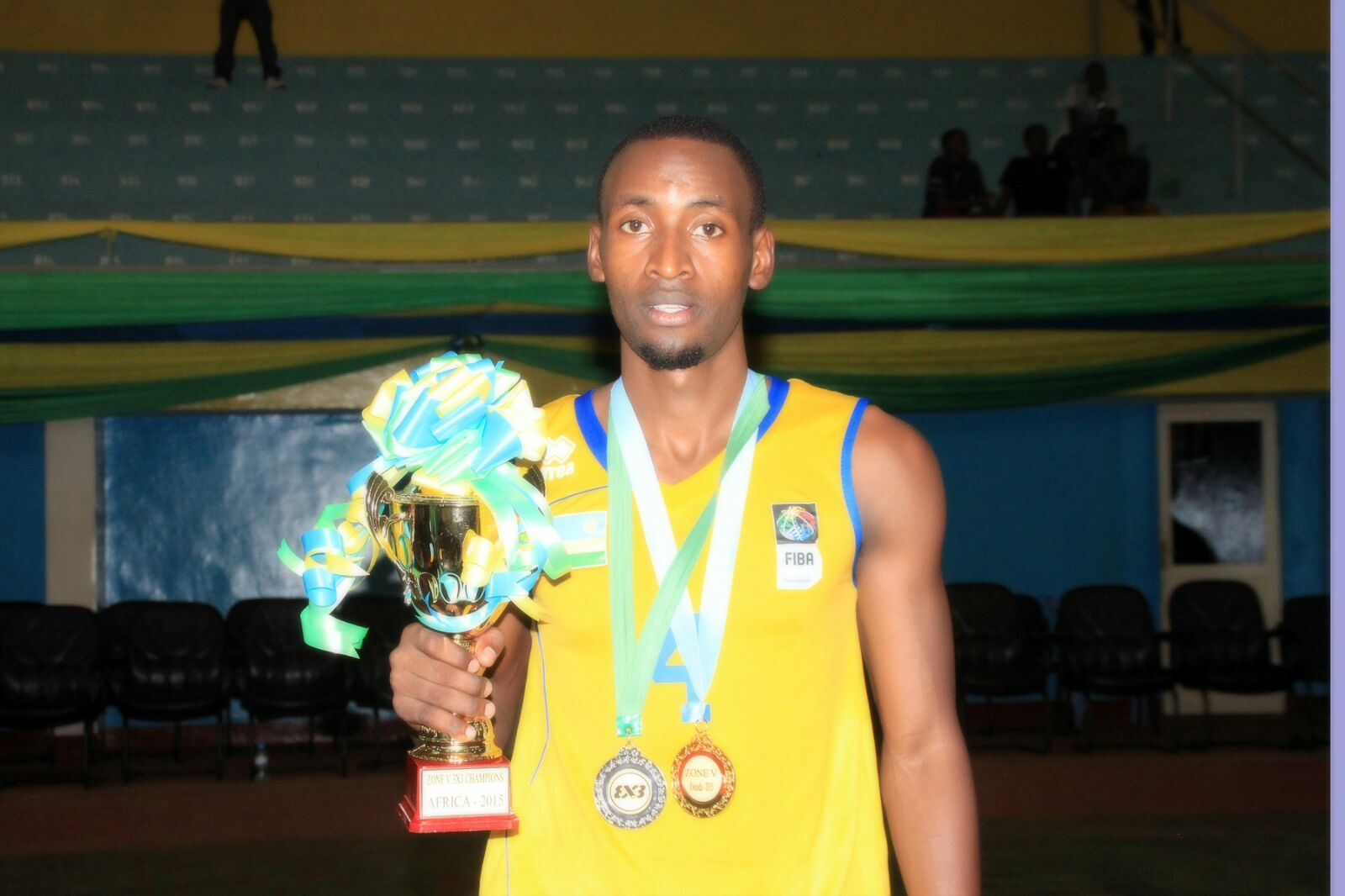
Kazingufu Ali with the Award of the Best Three Point Shooter in FIBA AFRICA Zone 5 3X3

Ali has been playing for the Rwanda national basketball team from 2014.
