= Aliou Diarra =

Malian basketball player (born 2001)

- Diarra with Virtus Bologna in 2026

No. 31 – Virtus Bologna
- Position: Center
- League: LBA; EuroLeague

Personal information
- Born: 31 December 2001 (age 24) Kayes, Mali
- Listed height: 6 ft 9 in (2.06 m)
- Listed weight: 210 lb (95 kg)

Career information
- NBA draft: 2023: undrafted
- Playing career: 2022–present

Career history
- 2022–2023: Stade Malien
- 2023–2024: FUS Rabat
- 2024–2025: APR
- 2025–present: Virtus Bologna

Career highlights
- 2× BAL Defensive Player of the Year (2023, 2025); 3× All-BAL First Team (2023–2025); 3× BAL All-Defensive Team (2023–2025); BAL rebounding leader (2023); 2× BAL blocks leader (2023, 2025); 2× RBL champion (2024, 2025); RBL Regular Season MVP (2025); Rwanda Cup winner (2024); Division Excellence champion (2024); Ligue 1 champion (2022); Malian Super Cup winner (2023)
Medals
Men's basketball
Representing Mali
AfroBasket
Silver medal – second place	2025 Angola

Aliou Fadiala Diarra (born 31 December 2001) is a Malian professional basketball player for Virtus Bologna of the Lega Basket Serie A (LBA). Diarra was recruited on outside courts by Stade Malien and was an unknown in professional basketball circles until he gained attention in 2023 for his performance in the Basketball Africa League (BAL). In his rookie season, he was named the BAL Defensive Player of the Year and was named to the All-BAL First Team. He won his second Defensive Player award in 2025. At the international level, Diarra debuted for the Mali national team in 2023 and led them to a silver medal at FIBA AfroBasket 2025.

== Early life ==
After initially playing soccer, Diarra picked up basketball in his hometown Kayes after he was encouraged to play by a stranger because of his notable height. There, he made a name for himself in the local community by playing on open courts and was eventually recruited by coach Kaba Kanté of Stade Malien, who spotted him playing at an outside court.

== Career ==
=== Stade Malien (2022–2023) ===
==== 2022–23: Breakout rookie season ====
Diarra, who says he models his game after Anthony Davis, made his first notable appearances in professional basketball with Stade Malien in the 2023 Road to BAL games. With 11.8 points and 11.5 rebounds per game, he helped Stade qualify for their first-ever BAL season on 19 November 2022. Diarra scored 16 points and grabbed 18 rebounds in the decisive third place game against Bangui Sporting Club.

On 18 March, Diarra had 20 points and 16 rebounds in a surprise win over REG. He led the Sahara Conference in rebounds and blocks per game. Over eight games, Diarra had eight double-doubles as he averaged 18.3 points and league-leading numbers of 12.8 rebounds and 2.3 blocks per game. Stade Malien finished in a surprising third place, and Diarra was named the BAL Defensive Player of the Year. Diarra was also honoured with a place in the All-BAL First Team.

=== FUS Rabat (2023–2024) ===
In the 2023 offseason, Diarra transferred to the Moroccan champions FUS Rabat of the Division Excellence (DEX-H). He played with the team in the 2024 tournament of the Road to BAL in October-November. On 4 November 2023, Diarra had a double-double of 18 points and 21 rebounds in the 78–60 win over FAP, that clinched the team's spot in the 2024 BAL season.

In the 2024 BAL season, Diarra was named to his second straight All-BAL First Team and All-Defensive Team selections. First-seed FUS Rabat, however, was eliminated in the quarterfinals by the eight-seeded Cape Town Tigers. Diarra helped FUS win the Division Excellence championship.

=== APR (2024–2025) ===
On 17 July 2024, Diarra signed a one-year contract with Rwandan champions APR of the Rwanda Basketball League (RBL). He won the double of both the RBL and the Rwandan Cup in his first season with the Lions.

On 26 May 2025, Diarra set a new BAL record for most blocks in a game when he had eight blocks against the Nairobi City Thunder, breaking the former record of seven by Anas Mahmoud and Khaman Maluach. In the playoffs, he helped APR finish in the third place, the best result ever by a Rwandan team. Diarra was also named the BAL Defensive Player of the Year for a second time in his career, after averaging 17.4 points, 11.6 rebounds, 3.4 blocks and one steal in eight games.

Diarra helped APR win the 2025 RBL championship too, and was named the Regular Season MVP.

Diarra opted play with the Dallas Mavericks in the 2025 NBA Summer League, thus leaving the RBL finals in the middle of the series.

=== Virtus Bologna (2025–present) ===
On 30 August 2025, Diarra signed a multi-year contarct with Virtus Bologna of the Lega Basket Serie A (LBA) and the EuroLeague.

== National team career ==
Diarra was selected for the Mali men's national basketball team for the first time in 2023, when he was selected for the 2023 FIBA AfroCan roster. He eventually did not play in the 2023 AfroCan.

He was selected for the FIBA AfroBasket 2025, where Diarra led Mali to a silver medal. On 21 August 2025, Diarra had 35 points and 14 rebounds in the quarterfinal win over Ivory Coast. Mali lost to hosts Angola in the final. Diarra averaged 15.7 points and a tournament-high 10.5 rebounds per game, and was name to the All-Tournament Team.

== Honours ==
APR

- Rwanda Basketball League: 2024
- Rwanda Basketball Cup: 2024
- Rwanda Basketball Supercup: 2024

FUS Rabat

- Division Excellence: 2023–24

Mali

- AfroBasket runners-up: 2025

Individual awards

- BAL Defensive Player of the Year: 2023, 2025
- All-BAL First Team: 2023, 2024
- BAL All-Defensive First Team: 2023, 2024, 2025
- Basketball Africa League rebounding leader: 2024
- Basketball Africa League blocks leader: 2024, 2025
- FIBA AfroBasket All-Tournament Team: 2025

== BAL career statistics ==
Legend
GP	Games played	GS	Games started	MPG	Minutes per game
FG%	Field goal percentage	3P%	3-point field goal percentage	FT%	Free throw percentage
RPG	Rebounds per game	APG	Assists per game	SPG	Steals per game
BPG	Blocks per game	PPG	Points per game	**Bold**	Career high
*	Led the league

Year	Team	GP	GS	MPG	FG%	3P%	FT%	RPG	APG	SPG	BPG	PPG
2023	Stade Malien	**8**	**8**	26.9	.553	.000	.417	**12.8***	1.4	**1.5**	2.3*	18.3
2024	FUS Rabat	6	6	24.5	**.667***	–	**.633**	10.0	1.0	1.0	2.2	16.5
2025	APR	**8**	**8**	**29.7**	.557*	.111	.558	11.8	**2.9**	1.4	**3.2***	**17.4**

== Personal ==
Diarra is fluent in Bambara and has been learning French and English.
