= Cheikh Sarr (basketball) =

Senegalese basketball coach (born 1968)

Rwanda
- Position: Head coach

Personal information
- Born: 25 July 1968 (age 58) Joal-Fadiouth, Senegal

Career history

Coaching
- 2012–2015: Senegal
- 2021–present: Rwanda
Medals
AfroBasket
Representing Senegal
Bronze medal – third place	2013 Ivory Coast
FIBA AfroCan
Representing Rwanda
Bronze medal – third place	2023 Angola

Dr. Cheikh Sarr (born 25 July 1968) is a Senegalese professional basketball coach. He is the current coach for the Rwanda national basketball team.

Sarr coached Senegal at the 2014 FIBA Basketball World Cup.

== Early life ==
Sarr is a native of Joal-Fadiouth where he was born. He went to "CAMP GMI -Thies" primary school, before continuing his middle school classes at Amady Coly Diop (ex Camp Faidherbe). Sarr finished his high school degree at the Lycee Malick Sy where he earned a bachelor's degree. At his younger age, he played many sports (Volleyball, handball, soccer, high jump, etc.) but basketball was his favorite. Sarr spent all his youth playing at US Rail Club in Thiès Region, under coach Gora Mbaye. When he reached 18 years old, he decided to stop playing in order to focus on his studies. Later, he continues with US Goree club after succeeding to INSEPS first year entry in 1992.

Sarr is a FIBA instructor of instructors and holds a PhD in sports psychology and a Master's degree in educational leadership, obtained at the University of Delaware, amongst numerous educational accreditations.

== Coaching career ==
From 2012 to 2015, Sarr was the head coach of the Senegal national basketball team. At the 2014 FIBA Basketball World Cup, he helped the team reach the second round for the first time in the nation's history. In 2018, he repeated the same performance with th Senegalese women's national team in Tenerife where the World Women's Basketball has been held.

In April 2021, Sarr signed a one-year contract to become the head coach of Rwanda. He later extended his contract until 2023. In March 2022, his contract has been extended for 2 more years with FERWABA, which runs into 2024.

In July 2023, Sarr guided Rwanda to a bronze medal at the 2023 FIBA AfroCan, the country's first-ever podium finish.

== Honours ==
Senegal

- Gold Zone 2 Cabo verde 2012
- Bronze AfroBasket 2013
- Silver AfroBasket 2019
