= BAL Defensive Player of the Year =

Annual Basketball Africa League award

BAL Dikembe Mutombo Defensive Player of the Year
- Sport: Basketball
- League: Basketball Africa League
- Awarded for: Best defensive player in the season of the Basketball Africa League

History
- First award: 2021
- Most wins: Aliou Diarra (2 times)
- Most recent: Mangok Mathiang (2026)

The Basketball Africa League Dikembe Mutombo Defensive Player of the Year is an annual Basketball Africa League (BAL) award given to the best defensive player of a given season. The award is named after Congolese basketball legend Dikembe Mutombo. The award was first handed out in the inaugural season to Anas Osama Mahmoud.

Players of the four teams that qualified for the semifinals can be selected. The selection committee exists of a number of BAL experts, including the head coaches of all teams.

Aliou Diarra holds the record for most awards won, as he received the honour two times. Jo Lual-Acuil, winner of the award in 2024, is the only player to win both the Defensive Player of the Year and the Most Valuable Player in the same season.

== Winners ==
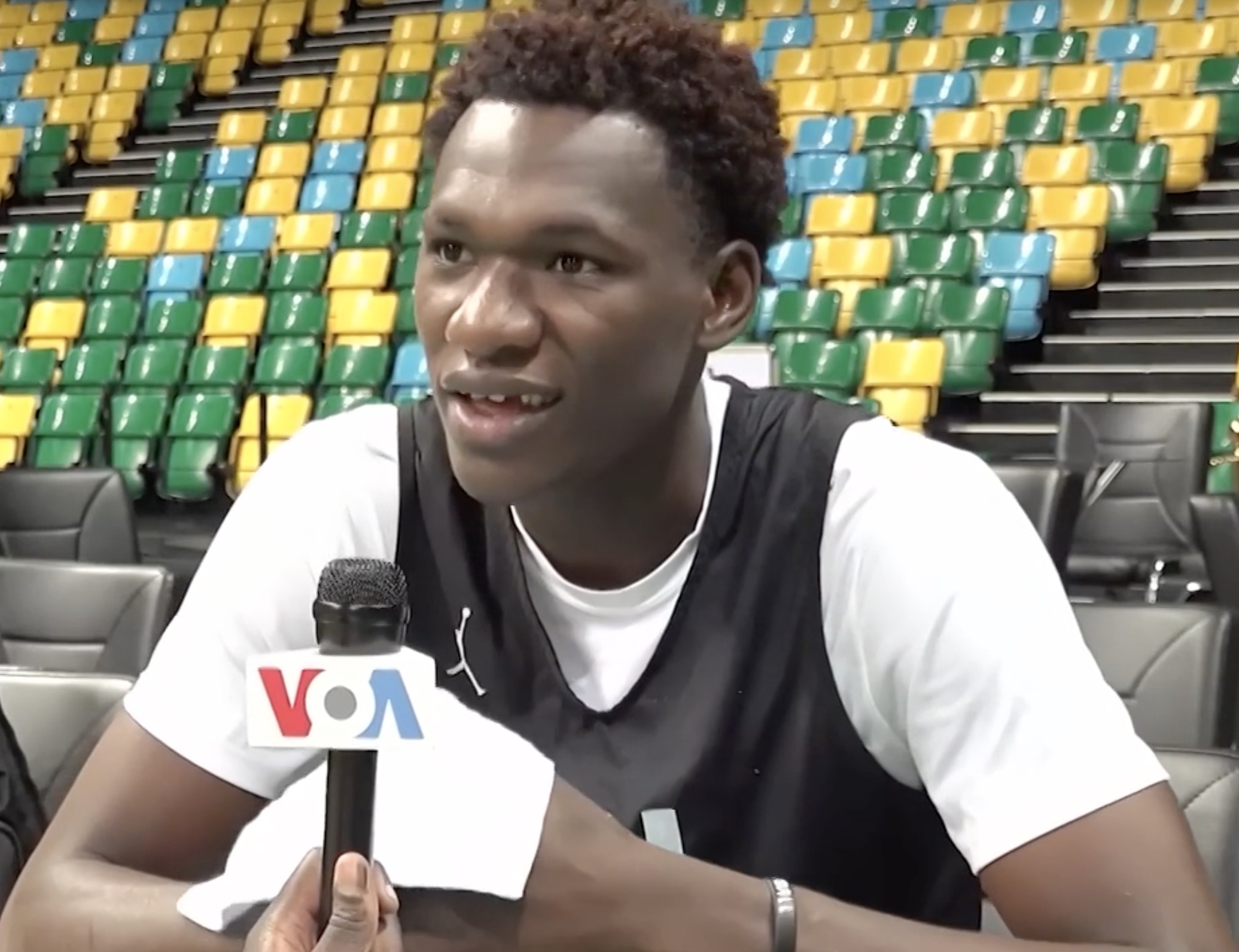
Aliou Diarra has won two awards

Season	Player	Position	Nationality	Club	Ref
2021	Anas Mahmoud	Center	Egypt	(Egypt) Zamalek	
2022	Ater Majok	Center	South Sudan (Note: Majok owns the Australian and Lebanese nationality, but played as an African import in the BAL due to his South Sudanese heritage.)	(Tunisia) US Monastir	
2023	Aliou Diarra	Center	Mali	(Mali) Stade Malien	
2024	Jo Lual-Acuil	Center	South Sudan	(Libya) Al Ahly Ly	
2025	Aliou Diarra (2)	Center	Mali	(Rwanda) APR	
2026	Mangok Mathiang	Center	South Sudan	(Rwanda) RSSB Tigers	
