= Dieudonné Ndizeye =

Rwandan basketball player (born 1996)

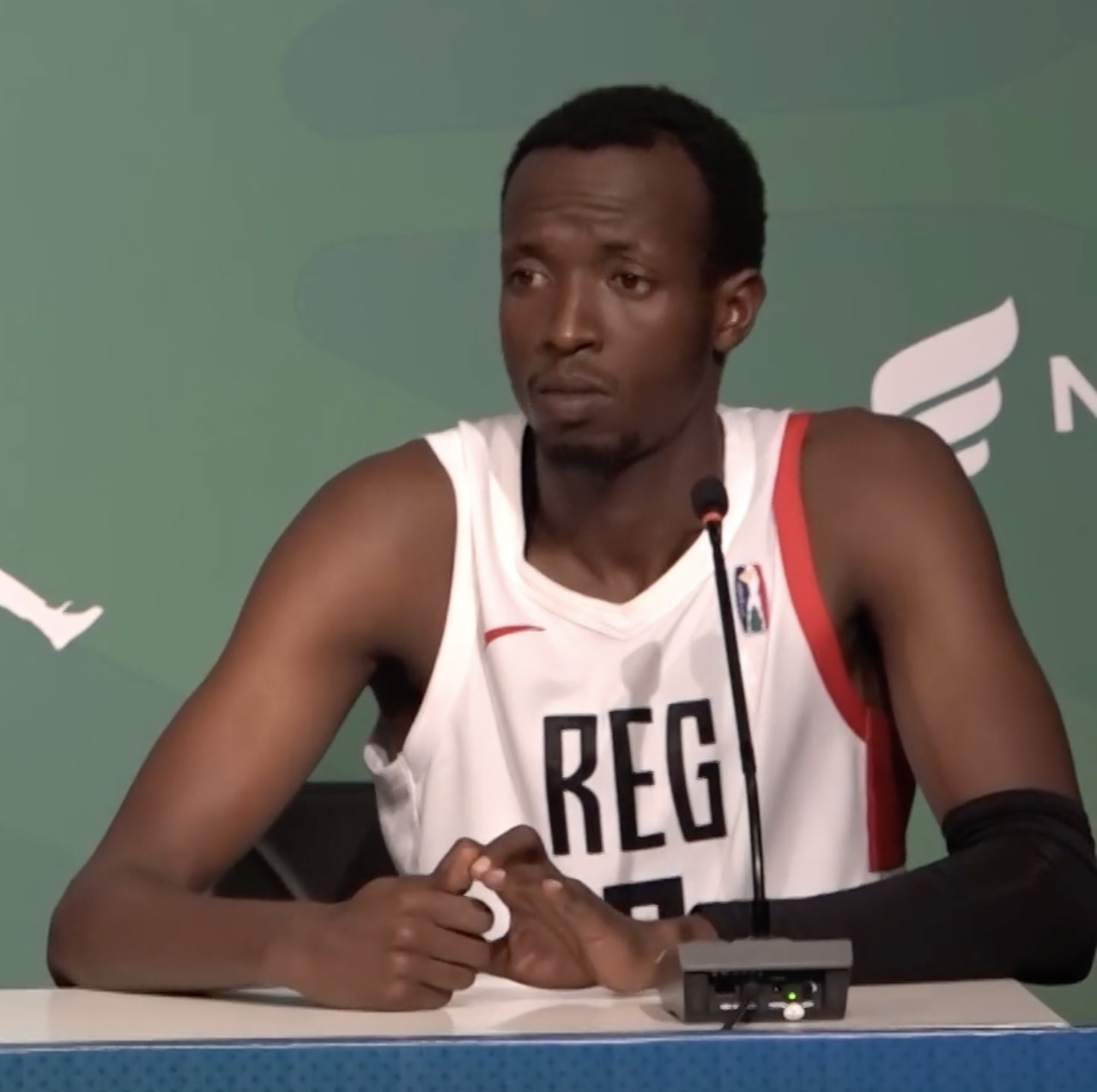
- Ndizeye in 2023

RSSB Tigers
- Position: Small forward
- League: RBL; BAL

Personal information
- Born: 14 October 1996 (age 30) Nyanza District, Rwanda
- Listed height: 2.03 m (6 ft 8 in)

Career information
- Playing career: 2015–present

Career history
- 2015–2017: IPRC-Kigali
- 2017–2024: Patriots
- 2021: →Cobra Sport
- 2022: →REG
- 2023: →REG
- 2024: →Kriol Star
- 2024–2025: REG
- 2025: MAS Fes
- 2025–2026: APR
- 2026–present: RSSB Tigers

Career highlights
- BAL champion (2026); 3× RBL champion (2018–2020); RBL MVP (2019); 2× First-team All-RBL (2019, 2021); 2× RBL All-Star (2021, 2022)
Medals
Men's basketball
Representing Rwanda
FIBA AfroCan
Bronze medal – third place	Angola 2023

Dieudonné Ndayisaba Ndizeye (born 14 October 1996) is a Rwandan basketball player for APR BBC of the Rwanda Basketball League (RBL) and the Rwanda national team. He is a three-time RBL champion and a one-time league MVP winner in 2019. Ndizeye has played two seasons in the BAL as well with REG.

== Professional career ==
Ndizeye started his career with IPRC-Kigali in the National Basketball League in 2015.

In 2017, Ndizeye joined Patriots BBC. He was named the national league MVP for the 2018–19 season.

In November 2021, he joined the South Sudanese side Cobra Sport to play for them in the 2022 BAL qualifying tournaments. He helped Cobra qualify for the BAL for the first time.

On February 14, 2022, Ndizeye was sent on loan to REG to play in the 2022 BAL season. He stayed on the Patriots team for the Rwanda Basketball League games.

In October 2024, he joined Cape Verdean team Kriol Star for the 2025 BAL qualification.

On October 9, 2024, Ndizeye signed a long-term deal with REG, as the club paid a transfer fee of FRw 80,000,000 to the Patriots. In January 2025, he joined MAS Fes in the Moroccan Division Excellence.

In October 2025, it was confirmed that Ndizeye had signed a one-year contract with APR.

== National team career ==
Since 2017, Ndizeye has been a member of the Rwanda national basketball team and has played in qualifying tournaments with his country.

Ndizeye won the bronze medal of 2023 FIBA AfroCan with Rwanda, and was named to the All-Tournament Team.

== BAL career statistics ==
Legend
GP	Games played	GS	Games started	MPG	Minutes per game
FG%	Field goal percentage	3P%	3-point field goal percentage	FT%	Free throw percentage
RPG	Rebounds per game	APG	Assists per game	SPG	Steals per game
BPG	Blocks per game	PPG	Points per game	**Bold**	Career high

Year	Team	GP	GS	MPG	FG%	3P%	FT%	RPG	APG	SPG	BPG	PPG
2021	Patriots	6	6	**28.4**	.338	**.343**	.750	5.0	1.8	.7	.5	11.5
2022	REG	6	6	28.1	**.386**	.342	**1.000**	**5.8**	**2.0**	.7	.5	**12.7**
