= Olivier Shyaka =

Rwandan basketball player

No. 10 – REG BBC
- Position: Shooting guard / small forward
- League: NBL Rwanda

Personal information
- Born: 14 August 1995 (age 31) Kavumu, Rwanda
- Listed height: 6 ft 6 in (1.98 m)

Career information
- Playing career: 2012–present

Career history
- 2012–2013: Kigali City BC
- 2013–2018: Espoir
- 2018–present: REG

Career highlights
- 4× NBL Rwanda champion (2014, 2015, 2021, 2022); 2× NBL Rwanda MVP (2015, 2021); 3× Rwandan Heroes Cup winner (2018–2020)

Olivier Shyaka (born 14 August 1995) is a Rwandan basketball player who plays for REG BBC club of the NBL Rwanda. He also plays for the Rwanda national basketball team. Shyaka is a two-time Rwandan League MVP, having won the award in 2015 and 2021.

== Club career ==
Since 2018, Shyaka plays for REG BBC. In the 2020–21 season, Shyaka won his first national championship with REG. He was named MVP of the league after scoring 30 points in Game 1 of the finals, and scoring 22 points in Game 2.

== National team career ==
Shyaka represented Rwanda's national basketball team on many occasions. At AfroBasket 2013, Shyaka was one of Rwanda's main players. He also played at AfroBasket 2017 and AfroBasket 2021.

== BAL career statistics ==
Legend
GP	Games played	GS	Games started	MPG	Minutes per game
FG%	Field goal percentage	3P%	3-point field goal percentage	FT%	Free throw percentage
RPG	Rebounds per game	APG	Assists per game	SPG	Steals per game
BPG	Blocks per game	PPG	Points per game	**Bold**	Career high

Year	Team	GP	GS	MPG	FG%	3P%	FT%	RPG	APG	SPG	BPG	PPG
2022	REG	5	0	12.3	.450	.462	–	2.0	0.4	0.0	0.0	4.8
