= Alan Major =

American basketball coach (born 1968)

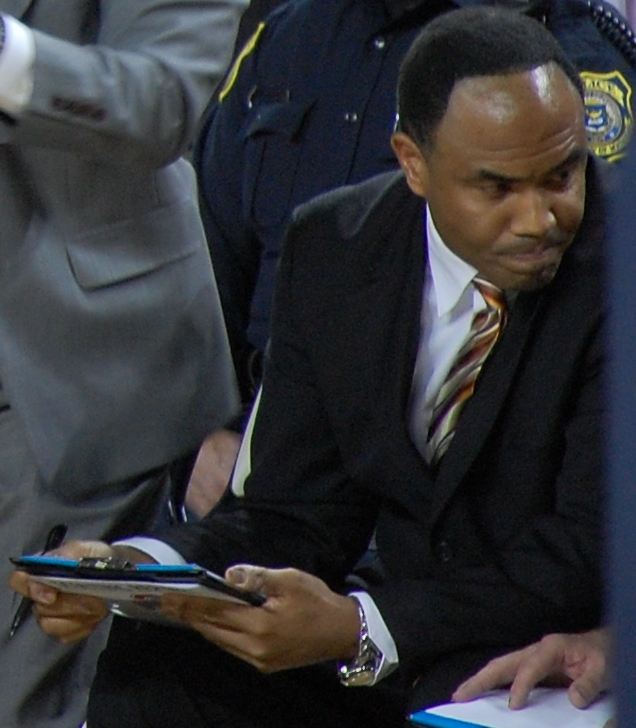
- Major in 2009 with Ohio State.

Personal information
- Born: June 21, 1968 (age 58) Indianapolis, Indiana, U.S.
- Position: Head coach
- Coaching career: 1992–present

Career history

Coaching
- 1992–1995: Cal Lutheran (assistant)
- 1995–1998: Pacific (assistant)
- 1998–1999: Southern Illinois (assistant)
- 1999–2000: Pacific (assistant)
- 2001–2004: Xavier (assistant)
- 2004–2010: Ohio State (assistant)
- 2010–2015: Charlotte
- 2021: Patriots
- 2021: Nigeria (assistant)

Career highlights
- As assistant coach: 3× Big Ten regular season (2006–2007, 2010); 2× Big Ten tournament (2007, 2010); 2× Atlantic 10 tournament (2002, 2004); 2× Atlantic 10 regular season (2002–2003); Big West tournament (1997); 2× Big West regular season (1997–1998); SCIAC playoffs (1994); 2× SCIAC regular season (1993–1994)

Alan Major
Biographical details
- Education: Purdue ('92)

Head coaching record
- Overall: 67–70
- Tournaments: 0–1 (NIT)

Alan M. Major (born June 21, 1968) is an American basketball coach who is the head coach of Patriots BBC of the Basketball Africa League (BAL). He was the head coach at the University of North Carolina at Charlotte from 2010 to 2015.

Before being named coach of the Charlotte 49ers, Major spent nine years working with Thad Matta at Ohio State and Xavier universities. Born in Indianapolis, Indiana, he is a 1992 graduate of Purdue. Major took an indefinite medical leave of absence due to multiple health issues in January 2015, and was replaced on an interim basis by his associate head coach, Ryan Odom. As of mid-2016, Major has a clean bill of health. He returned to the sidelines in 2016 as Director of Player Development back at Ohio State from 2016 to 2017. During his time away from coaching, Major traveled the U.S. to visit dozens of successful college and NBA teams. He also assisted several overseas tour teams to China, Israel, and the Philippines.

Major served as a student manager under Gene Keady during his undergraduate tenure at Purdue. After graduating in 1992, Major became an assistant coach at Cal Lutheran, a Div. III school, and then spent three years working under all-time Big West Conference wins leader Bob Thomason at University of the Pacific. He spent one season, 1998–1999, on the staff of fellow Purdue alumnus Bruce Weber before returning to Pacific. In 2001, he became an assistant coach at Xavier under Thad Matta. He followed Matta to Ohio State in 2004 where he worked as an assistant coach for six seasons. On April 12, 2010, he was named the head coach of Charlotte.

Major coached two No. 1 overall picks in the NBA draft during his time as an assistant. At Pacific, Major worked with Michael Olowokandi who was the top pick in the 1998 draft. At Ohio State, Major was the big men coach when Greg Oden came to the school. Oden was the number one pick in the 2007 NBA draft.

Following the conclusion of the 2014–15 season, it was announced that Major would step down as head coach in order to fully recover and re-energize himself. His record as 49ers head coach was 67 wins and 70 losses with the program attaining an overall record during his tenure of 75–81. Significant milestones included winning the 2012 Great Alaska Shootout and 2013 Puerto Rico Tip-off tournaments and victories over #7 ranked Tennessee, #10 ranked Butler, and previous National Championship runners-up, #14 ranked Michigan.

In April 2021, Major signed as head coach of the Rwandan club Patriots BBC to coach the team in the first-ever Basketball Africa League (BAL) season. He was also an assistant coach on the Nigeria national basketball team during AfroBasket 2021.

== Head coaching record ==
Record table
Season	Team	Overall	Conference	Standing	Postseason
Charlotte 49ers (Atlantic 10 Conference) (2010–2013)
2010–11	Charlotte	10–20	2–14	13th	
2011–12	Charlotte	13–17	5–11	11th	
2012–13	Charlotte	21–12	8–8	T-8th	NIT First Round
Charlotte 49ers (Conference USA) (2013–2015)
2013–14	Charlotte	17–14	7–9	T-5th	
2014–15*	Charlotte*	6–7*	0–1*	11th*	
Charlotte:		67–70	22–43		
Total:		67–70			
National champion Postseason invitational champion Conference regular season champion Conference regular season and conference tournament champion Division regular season champion Division regular season and conference tournament champion Conference tournament champion

*Alan Major took an indefinite leave of absence due to medical reasons on January 6, 2015. Charlotte's record at the time was 6–7 (0–1 C-USA).
