= Kami Kabange =

Rwandan basketball player (born 1984)

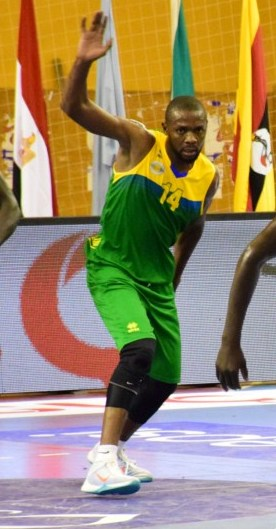
- Kabange with Rwanda in 2017

Personal information
- Born: 2 July 1984 (age 42) Likasi, Democratic Republic of the Congo
- Listed height: 6 ft 8 in (2.03 m)

Career information
- Playing career: 2007–2023
- Position: Center
- Number: 20

Career history
- 2007–2011: APR
- 2012–2013: Espoir
- 2013–2016: City Oilers
- 2017–2023: REG
- 2019: →ASB Mazembe

Career highlights
- 6× RBL champion (2008, 2009, 2013, 2017, 2021, 2022); 4× NBL Uganda champion (2013–2016); 2× NBL Uganda Playoffs MVP (2013, 2015); 3× NBL Uganda Top Scorer (2013, 2014, 2015); 2× USPA Male Basketball Player of the Year (2013, 2015)

Kami Kabange (born 2 July 1984) is a Congolese-born naturalized Rwandan former basketball player. Standing at 2.03 m (6 ft 8 in), he plays as center. He had a 12-season long career for different clubs in East Africa. Born in the Democratic Republic of Congo, he is a naturalised Rwandan citizen and represented the Rwanda national team.

== Early life ==
Born in Likasi, Kabange started playing basketball at a young age, inspired by his brothers. When he was 17, he was noticed by Lubumbashi Sport, who offered him to play in the topflight Congolese league.

== Professional career ==
After playing one season with Lubumbashi Sport, Kabange appeared two seasons for Besa Mazembe.

Kabange started his professional career in Rwanda with APR, under head coach Cliff Owuor. In his first season, he helped the team win consecutive Rwandan National League titles.

After four seasons with APR, he transferred to Espoir and helped the team win the 2012 national title.

In 2013, Kabange signed with the City Oilers club of the NBL Uganda league. In 2021, Kabange was on the REG squad again.

In 2019, he played for ASB Mazembe from Congo in the 2020 BAL Qualifying Tournaments.

Kabange represented Rwanda's national basketball team on many occasions. At the 2013 AfroBasket he played most minutes for his team and was Rwanda's top rebounder and shot blocker.

In September 2023, Kabange retired at age 39.

== National team career ==
Kabange debuted for the Rwanda national team in 2009, and played with the team at AfroBasket during four tournaments, in 2009, 2011, 2013, 2017.

== BAL career statistics ==
Legend
| GP | Games played | GS | Games started | MPG | Minutes per game |
| FG% | Field goal percentage | 3P% | 3-point field goal percentage | FT% | Free throw percentage |
| RPG | Rebounds per game | APG | Assists per game | SPG | Steals per game |
| BPG | Blocks per game | PPG | Points per game | **Bold** | Career high |

| Year | Team | GP | GS | MPG | FG% | 3P% | FT% | RPG | APG | SPG | BPG | PPG |
|---|---|---|---|---|---|---|---|---|---|---|---|---|
| 2022 | REG | 1 | 0 | 1.2 | – | – | – | 0.0 | 1.0 | 0.0 | 0.0 | 0.0 |
