= Heroes' Cup (Rwanda) =

- Country: Rwanda
- Federation: FERWABA
- Most championships: Men's: REG (3 titles); Women's: Ubumwe (2 titles)

The Heroes' Cup, also known as the Heroes' Day Tournament, is an annual basketball cup competition for the premier teams in Rwanda. The Heroes Cup tournaments are organised by their respective federations in partnership with the Chancellery for Heroes, National Orders and Decorations of Honour (CHENO). The final of the cup is played each year on National Heroes' Day on February 1.

Since 2024, Rwandan men's teams have another FERWABA-organised cup competition in the Rwanda Basketball Cup.

== Men tournament ==
| Season | Champions | Runners-up | Score | MVP | Ref. |
|---|---|---|---|---|---|
| 2015 | Espoir | KBC | 81–61 | Aristide Mugabe | |
| 2016 | Patriots | Espoir | 84–72 | Aristide Mugabe | |
| 2018 | REG | | | | |
| 2019 | REG | Patriots | 92–72 | Beleck Bell Engelbert | |
| 2020 | REG | APR | 71–62 | | |
| 2021 | Cancelled due to the coronavirus pandemic | | | | |

== Women tournament ==
| Season | Champions | Runners-up | Score | Stadium | MVP | Ref. |
|---|---|---|---|---|---|---|
| 2015 | Ubumwe | APR | 61–52 | | Lisanne Comean | |
| 2016 | Ubumwe | APR | 74–66 | | | |
| 2019 | The Hoops Rwanda | Ubumwe | 55–54 | Amahoro Indoor Stadium | Marie Laurence Imanizabayo | |
| 2020 | IPRC Huye | The Hoops Rwanda | 70–47 | Amahoro Indoor Stadium | | |

== See also ==
- National Basketball League (Rwanda)
