= Kenny Gasana =

Rwandan basketball player (born 1984)

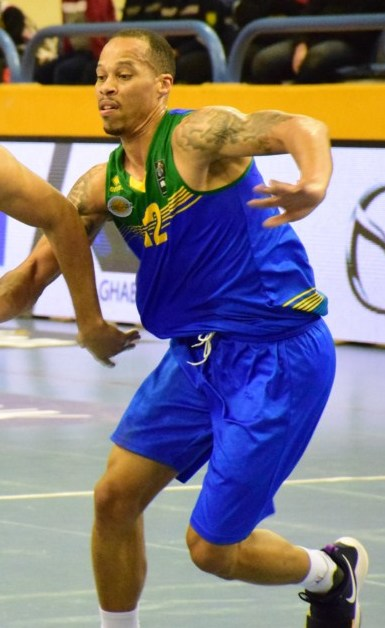
- Gasana with Rwanda in 2017

No. 12 – RSSB Tigers
- Title: Assistant coach
- League: BAL

Personal information
- Born: November 9, 1984 (age 42) San Antonio, Texas, U.S.
- Listed height: 1.90 m (6 ft 3 in)

Career information
- High school: John Jay HS (San Antonio, Texas)
- College: McLennan CC (2003–2005); Boise State (2005-2007)
- NBA draft: 2007: undrafted
- Playing career: 2007–present
- Position: Shooting guard

Career history

Playing
- 2010–2011: Chabab Rif Al Hoceima
- 2011–2012: Plaza Sports
- 2014–2015: Gezira
- 2015–2016: Texas Fuel
- 2018–2019: Ittihad Tanger
- 2019: REG
- 2019–present: Patriots
- 2021: →New Star
- 2022: Bahrain Club
- 2022: →REG
- 2022: Bangui Sporting Club

Coaching
- 2026–present: RSSB Tigers

Career highlights
- As player: RBL champion (2020); First-team All-RBL (2022); 2× RBL All-Star (2021, 2022); ABA All Star-Game (2011); As assistant coach: BAL champion (2026)

Kenneth Gasana (born Kenneth Wilson; November 9, 1984) is a Rwandan former basketball player and current coach. Born in the United States, he represents the team of Rwanda internationally.

== Playing career ==
Gasana played his final two years of college basketball for Boise State.

Gasana started his professional career in 2007. In 2010, Gasana joined Moroccan club Chabab Rif Al Hoceima for one season which was followed by another season at Spaza Sports BC. In the 2014–15 season, he played in Egypt with Gezira.

His third team in Morocco was Ittihad Tanger, which he joined in 2018.

In 2019, Gasana signed with Rwanda-based REG BBC to play in the Rwandan National Basketball League. In October 2019, he joined the defending champions Patriots BBC. He went on to win the championship in 2019 and 2020 with Patriots. He also played with the team in the 2021 BAL season, where he led his team in scoring with 14.3 points per game. The Patriots finished in the fourth place of the tournament.

In November 2021, Gasana joined Burundian team New Star on a temporary contract, to join them in the 2022 BAL qualifiers. New Star failed to qualify, as the team was disqualified after players tested positive for COVID-19.

On January 5, 2022, Gasana signed with Bahrain Club of the Bahraini Premier League.

In May 2022, Gasana joined REG for a second stint ahead of the team's campaign in the 2022 BAL Playoffs. They were eliminated after just one game, losing to FAP. After the BAL, Gasana returned to Patriots BBC.

In November 2022, Gasana played for Bangui Sporting Club in the Road to BAL.

== Coaching career ==
In November 2025, Gasana was an assistant with the Rwanda national team. In December 2025, Gasana joined Tigers BBC as assistant coach.

== National team career ==
Although he was born in San Antonio, Texas, Gasana plays for the Rwandan national team and has been one of its top scorers through various editions of AfroBasket. He played with Rwanda at the AfroBasket five times: in 2009, 2011, 2013, 2017 and 2021.

== BAL career statistics ==
Legend
GP	Games played	GS	Games started	MPG	Minutes per game
FG%	Field goal percentage	3P%	3-point field goal percentage	FT%	Free throw percentage
RPG	Rebounds per game	APG	Assists per game	SPG	Steals per game
BPG	Blocks per game	PPG	Points per game	**Bold**	Career high

Year	Team	GP	GS	MPG	FG%	3P%	FT%	RPG	APG	SPG	BPG	PPG
2021	Patriots	6	6	30.9	.424	.412	.941	4.2	3.7	1.3	.3	14.3
2022	REG	1	0	24.0	.167	.200	1.000	5.0	2.0	3.0	–	7.0

== Personal ==
Gasana holds a bachelor's degree in Communications from Boise State University.
