= APR BBC =

APR
- 2026 BAL season
- Nickname: The Lions
- Division: Division 1
- Leagues: Rwanda Basketball League; BAL
- Founded: 1993
- History: APR BBC (1993–present)
- Arena: BK Arena
- Capacity: 10,000
- Location: Kigali, Rwanda
- Chairman: Richard Murefu
- Head coach: James Maye Jr.
- Ownership: Ministry of Defence
- 2026 position: 1st of 14
- Championships: 17 Rwandan Leagues; 1 Rwandan Cup
Home	Away	Third

Armée Patriotique Rwandaise Basketball Club, commonly known simply as APR, is a Rwandan basketball club based in Kigali. Owned and funded by the Ministry of Defence of Rwanda, the team plays in the Rwanda Basketball League (RBL) and in the Basketball Africa League (BAL). Nicknamed the "Lions", the team is the most decorated team in the country, as APR has won a record 17 national championships.

== History ==
Originating during the Rwandan Patriotic Front (RPF)'s liberation struggle during the Rwandan Civil War in 1993, the club was established to serve as a means to engage and occupy soldiers during a ceasefire amid the peace talks that eventually led to the signing of the Arusha Accords. Alongside the basketball team, the RPF introduced teams in volleyball and football, which continue to operate successfully.

From 1995 to 2003, APR won nine consecutive national championships.

The Lions were taken over by Kenya-born head coach Cliff Uwuor in 2005. They won the FIBA Africa Zone 5 Club Championship in 2008, and won league titles in 2005, 2006, 2009 and 2010.

In 2008, APR became the first team in league history to finish the regular season unbeaten. Its successes were partly due to APR's high-quality foreign players, mainly from the DR Congo. After its thirteenth championship in 2009, the team went a decade without notable performances. The club opted to play with homegrown players in these years, a decision that coach Uwuor named as a reason for less titles in these years.

In the 2023 offseason, the Lions acquired national team player Axel Mpoyo, Jean Jacques Nshobozwabyosenumukiza and Ntore Habimana, among others. APR eventually ended its 13-year long title drought before by winning another title in the 2023 RBL season, under head coach Maz Trakh.

APR made its BAL debut in the 2024 season, receiving direct qualification to the main tournament as Rwandan champion. The Lions were allocated in the Sahara Conference, but disappointingly finished in the fourth place in the group, becoming the first Rwandan team in league history to miss out on the playoffs. In August, they won the inaugural Rwanda Cup title. APR also won the 2024 league title, qualifying them for a second BAL season.

In the 2025 BAL season, APR finished in the third place of the league, the best result by a Rwandan team in league history, surpassing Patriots' fourth place in 2021. The Lions also set a league record for most points scored in a game in the third place game, after beating Al Ittihad 123–90. Center Aliou Diarra was named the BAL Defensive Player of the Year. On July 12, 2025, they won their 16th national championship. They won another championship in 2026.

== Honours ==
=== National ===
Rwanda Basketball League / National Basketball League

- Champions (16): 1995, 1996, 1997, 1998, 1999, 2000, 2001, 2002, 2003, 2005, 2006, 2008, 2009, 2023, 2024, 2025, 2026
  - Runners-up (2): 2013, 2014

Rwanda Cup

- Winners (1): 2024

Rwandan Heroes Cup

- Runners-up (1): 2020

Genocide Memorial Tournament

- Winners (1): 2024

=== International ===
Basketball Africa League (BAL)

- Third Place (1): 2025

FIBA Africa Clubs Champions Cup

- Third Place (1): 2009

FIBA Africa Zone 5 Club Championship

- Winners (3): 2002, 2007, 2008

=== Friendly ===
Legacy Basketball Tournament

- Winners (1): 2024

== In FIBA and BAL competitions ==
FIBA Africa Clubs Champions Cup (3 appearances)

2007 – 6th Place
2008 – 8th Place
2009 – (bronze) Third place

Basketball Africa League (BAL) (1 appearance)

2024 – To be determined

== Season by season ==
Season	Regular season				Playoffs	Cup competition
Season	Finish	Wins	Losses	Pct.	Playoffs	Cup competition
APR
2017–18	Season was not held					
2018–19	4th	7	6	.538	Lost semifinals (Patriots) 2–3	
2019–20	3rd (Note: In the 2019–20 season, the season was shortened due to the COVID-19 pandemic, and as such APR only played a group phase of three games.)	2	1	.667	Lost semifinals (Patriots) 68–75	Runners-up (HC)
2020–21	4th	10	1	.909	Won quarterfinals (UGB) 93–51; Lost semifinals (Patriots) 0–2	
2021–22	3rd	21	3	.875	Lost semifinals (REG) 1–2	
2023	3rd	19	3	.864	Won semifinals (Patriots, 3–0); Won finals (REG, 4–0)	
2024	2nd	16	2	.889	Won semifinals (REG, 3–0) Won finals (Patriots, 4–2)	Winners (RC)
2025	1st	15	1	.938	Won semifinals (Patriots, 3–2) Won finals (REG, 4–1)	4th Place
2026	1st	14	2	.875	Won semifinals (Tigers, 3–2) Won finals (Patriots, 4–0)	TBD
Regular season record		104	19	.841		
Play-down record		25	13	.658		

== Players ==
=== Current roster ===
Note: Flags indicate national team eligibility at FIBA-sanctioned events. Players may hold other non-FIBA nationalities not displayed.

APR roster
Players
Coaches

Pos.	No.	Nat.	Name	Ht.		Age
G	00	(Rwanda)	Filer, Adonis	1.83 m (6 ft 0 in)		33 – 11 July 1993
G	2	(United States)	Noel, Obadiah (I)	1.92 m (6 ft 4 in)	80 kg (176 lb)	27 – 28 June 1999
F/C	4	(United States)	Hunt, Dario	2.06 m (6 ft 9 in)		37 – 2 May 1989
F	5	(Rwanda)	Ruta, Christopher	2.08 m (6 ft 10 in)		25 – 9 November 2000
SG	6	(Rwanda)	Robeyns, William	1.91 m (6 ft 3 in)		30 – 23 February 1996
F	7	(Rwanda)	Mpoyo, Axel	2.01 m (6 ft 7 in)		29 – 5 January 1997
G	11	(Rwanda)	Nshobozwabyosenumukiza, Jean Jacques	1.83 m (6 ft 0 in)		28 – 26 June 1998
PF	14	(Kenya)	Wamukota, Tom	2.13 m (7 ft 0 in)		33 – 28 September 1993
PG	15	(Rwanda)	Habimana, Ntore	1.96 m (6 ft 5 in)		29 – 15 August 1997
SF	23	(Rwanda)	Kimasa, Dan	1.98 m (6 ft 6 in)		31 – 1 January 1995
G/F	28	(Senegal)	Camara, Mohamed (E)	2.03 m (6 ft 8 in)		21 – 1 April 2005
F/C	34	(Egypt)	Abdullah, Mohamed (I)	2.06 m (6 ft 9 in)		23 – 3 November 2003
PG	45	(Rwanda)	Larson, Niyibizi	1.83 m (6 ft 0 in)		20 – 14 October 2006

Head coach

- (United States) Maz Trakh

Assistant coach(es)

- (United States) Bill Bayno
- (Rwanda) Daniel Zigirinshuti

Legend

- (C) Team captain
- (I) Import player
- (E): BAL Elevate player
- Injured

- Roster
Updated: May 4, 2024

=== Notable players ===
Note: Flags indicate national team eligibility at FIBA-sanctioned events. Players may hold other non-FIBA nationalities not displayed.

Criteria

To appear in this section a player must have either:

- Set a club record or won an individual award while at the club
- Played at least one official international match for their national team at any time
- Played at least one official NBA match at any time.

- (Rwanda) Wilson Nshobozwabyosenumukiza
- (Rwanda) Cedric Isom
- (Rwanda) (Canada) Ntore Habimana
- (Cameroon) Ulrich Chomche
- (Democratic Republic of the Congo) Kami Kabange
- (Serbia) Darko Balaban
- (Kenya) Tom Wamukota
- (United States) Jordan McRae

== Head coaches ==
The following people have been head coaches of APR:

- (Kenya) Cliff Uwuor: (2005–2023)
- (United States) Maz Trakh: (2023–2024)
- (United States) James Maye Jr.: (2024–present)

== Women's team ==
APR WBBC is the club's women's team plays in the Rwanda Women's Basketball League and have represented the country in the 2022 FIBA Africa Women's Champions Cup.
