= BK Arena =

Arena in Kigali, Rwanda

- Interactive map of BK Arena
- Former names: Kigali Arena (2019–2022)
- Location: Kigali, Rwanda
- Coordinates: 1.951719°S 30.115580°E
- Owner: Rwanda Ministry of Sports & Rwanda Housing Authority
- Capacity: 10,000
- Type: Indoor arena
- Record attendance: 10,152
- Field size: 28,750 m^{2} (construction area)

Construction
- Groundbreaking: 19 January 2019
- Opened: 9 August 2019
- Cost: $104 Million
- Builder: SUMMA
- Main contractor: Rwanda Housing Authority

Tenant
- Rwanda Basketball League

Website
- www.kigaliarena.rw

BK Arena (formerly known as Kigali Arena) is a multi-purpose indoor arena in Kigali, Rwanda, used mostly for basketball and volleyball matches. Built and finished in 2019, it hosts sporting events and concerts. It is the biggest indoor arena in East Africa and is located next to the Amahoro Stadium.

The arena is regularly used for games in the Rwanda Basketball League (RBL). It was constructed by SUMMA, a Turkish international contractor.

In 2021 Kigali Arena signed a contract with Rwandan singer Bruce Melodie for him to be its brand ambassador for the next three years with a shared objective to position the venue as a regional entertainment hub.

On 24 May 2022, the arena's name was changed to the BK Arena after a six-year sponsorship deal worth 7 billion RF with the Bank of Kigali.

== Construction ==
Construction of the Kigali Arena, a joint project of the Rwandan government through the Rwanda Housing Authority (RHA) and Turkish firm Summa, began in January 2019. The construction of the indoor arena was supervised by the RHA. Construction progressed at a fast rate, with around 1,000 to 2,000 people employed to work on the project both in day and night shifts. By mid-June 2019, the indoor arena was at least 70 percent complete and was completed in July 2019.

== Events ==
The Kigali Arena has hosted various sports events that the 2019 FIBA Under-16 Women's African Championship, the AfroBasket 2021, and the 2021 African Nations Volleyball Championships. It will host the 2023 Women's Afrobasket.

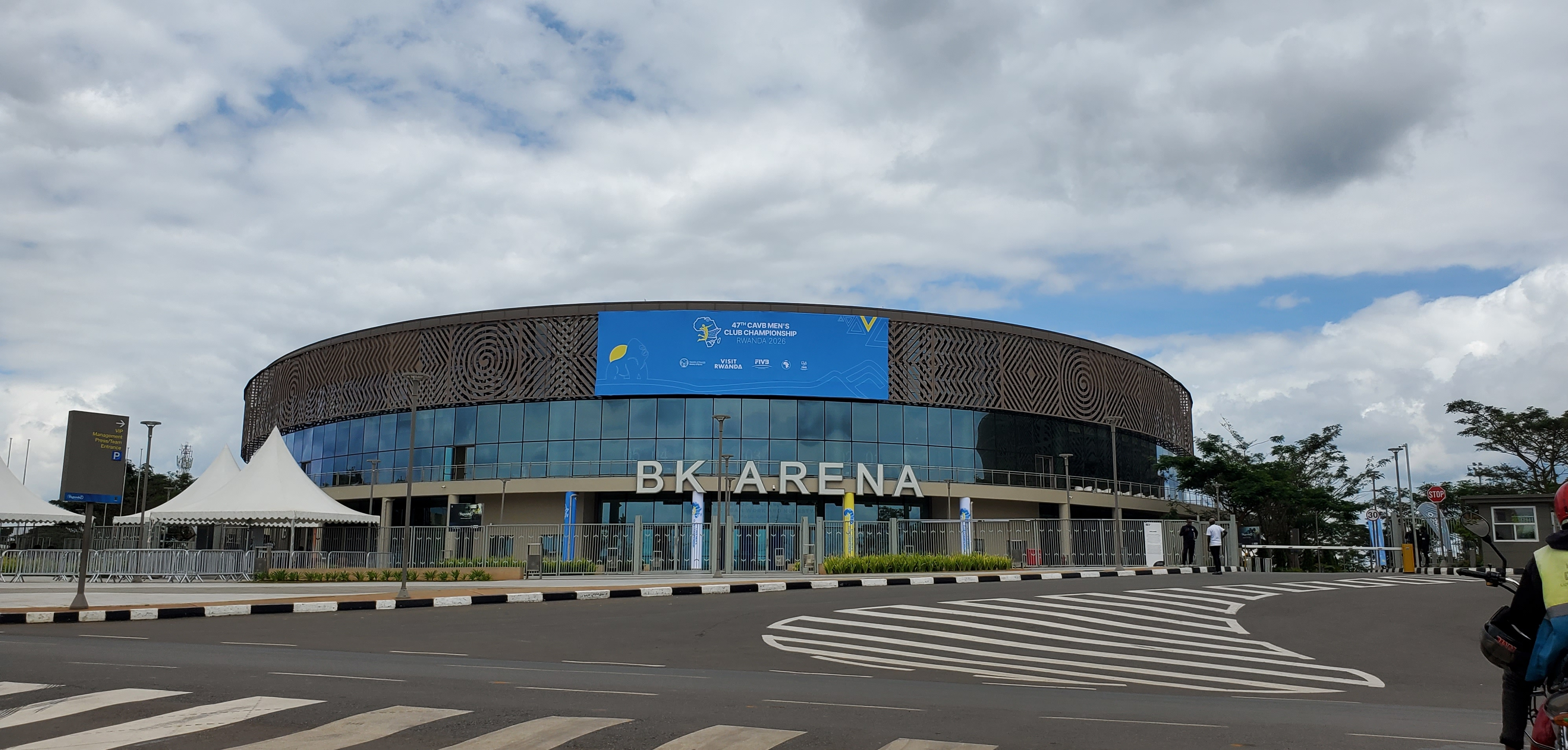
BK ARENA-KIGALI RWANDA

It has hosted the finals of the 2019 Rwandan National Basketball League, selling out multiple games. The arena was supposed to host the Final Four of the inaugural season of the Basketball Africa League (BAL), but eventually hosted the entire regular season of 2021 due to the COVID-19 pandemic. The BK Arena also hosted the playoffs in 2022 and 2023, following an agreement between the BAL and the Ministry of Sport.

On 9 August 2019, the arena was inaugurated with a basketball game between Patriots BBC and REG BBC, with Rwandan President Paul Kagame in attendance.

In 2021, Kigali Arena played host to the inaugural edition of the Basketball Africa League (BAL) and the 2021 Afrobasket championship. In 2022, the second season of the BAL held its playoffs in the arena.

On 16 March 2023, the arena hosted the 73rd FIFA Congress.

On 17 March 2026, the BK Arena was host to Global Citizen's Move Afrika Festival tour, featuring American rapper and singer-songwriter Doja Cat.

== Features ==
Kigali Arena is a 10,000 capacity indoor arena for indoor sports such as basketball, handball, volleyball, and tennis, as well as concerts and conferences. The sports venue is situated nearby the 45,000 capacity Amahoro Stadium and the 2,500 capacity Amahoro Indoor Stadium. .video of a tour to BK ARENA :https://www.youtube.com/watch?v=tQY4TWRHPZA

== See also ==
- List of basketball arenas
- List of indoor arenas by capacity
