= Patriots BBC =

Patriots
- Leagues: Rwanda Basketball League
- Founded: 2014
- History: Patriots BBC (2014–present)
- Arena: Amahoro Indoor Stadium / Kigali Arena
- Capacity: 2,500 / 10,000
- Location: Kigali, Rwanda
- Team colors: Red, Black, Gold, White
- Main sponsor: Rwanda Development Bank
- President: Brian Kirungi
- Head coach: Sunny Niyomugabo
- Championships: 4 Rwandan Leagues
Home	Away

Patriots Basketball Club, also known as Patriots, is a professional basketball club based in Kigali, Rwanda. Established in 2014, it plays its home games at Amahoro Indoor Stadium. The team is a four-time champion of the Rwanda Basketball League (RBL).

In the 2021 season, the Patriots played in the Basketball Africa League (BAL). The club gained worldwide attention when American star rapper J. Cole signed with the team to play in the BAL.

== History ==
The club Patriots BBC was founded in 2014 by a group of top corporate executives from diverse sectors of the economy. In the Patriots' debut season, they immediately reached the playoff finals, but lost to Espoir 1–3. Two years later, the Patriots won their first national championship.

On 21 September 2019, the Patriots won their fourth league title after defeating REG BBC in Game 7 of the finals, in a sold out Kigali Arena. On 26 October, head coach Henry Mwinuka, who won three league championships with Patriots, parted ways with the club to join REG. On 6 November, assistant coach Carey Odhiambo was promoted to become head coach.

Patriots were part of the qualifiers for the 2021 Basketball Africa League season, winning the east division and qualifying for the first season of the BAL. In April 2021, ahead of the first-ever BAL season, the team signed American Alan Major as new head coach. On 10 May 2021, American rapper Jermaine Cole (known under his artist name J. Cole) signed with the Patriots four days before the release of his sitxth studio album, The Off-Season. Cole played three pool games in the BAL, but left the team ahead of the quarterfinals after his contract ended.

The Patriots played their first BAL game on 16 May 2021 at home in Kigali, beating Nigerian side Rivers Hoopers 83–60. Eventually, the team finished in fourth place at the inaugural tournament, losing to Angolan side Petro de Luanda in the third place game.

After the 2023–24 season, Mwinuka left the team, and was replaced by new head coach Sunny Niyomugabo.

== Sponsorships ==
In 2024, Patriots BBC signed a five-year sponsorship contract with the Rwanda Development Bank (RDB).

== Players ==
=== Current roster ===
As of 14 July 2024

Note: Flags indicate national team, as has been defined under FIBA eligibility rules. Players may hold more than one non-FIBA nationality.

2024 Patriots BBC roster
No.	Pos.	Nat.	Player
0	SG	(Rwanda) RWA	Bruno Nyamwasa
1	F	(Rwanda) RWA	Furaha de Dieu
2	SG	(United States) USA	Will Perry
5	PG	(Rwanda) RWA	Sedar Sagamba
10	C	(Rwanda) RWA	Frank Betoudji
12	SG	(Rwanda) RWA	Kenny Gasana
13	F/C	(Rwanda) RWA	Bienvenu Niyonsaba
15	F/C	(Rwanda) RWA	Olivier Kamilindi
23	F	(Rwanda) RWA	Steven Hagumintwari
32	SG	(Rwanda) RWA	Samuel Ndayizeye
34	SG	(Rwanda) RWA	Dieudonné Ndizeye

=== Retired numbers ===
Patriots BBC retired numbers
N°	Player	Position	Tenure	Ceremony date
88	Aristide Mugabe	SG	2015–2023	2 March 2024

=== Past rosters ===
- 2021 BAL season

=== Notable players ===
Note: Flags indicate national team eligibility at FIBA-sanctioned events. Players may hold other non-FIBA nationalities not displayed.

Criteria

To appear in this section a player must have either:

- Set a club record or won an individual award while at the club
- Played at least one official international match for their national team at any time
- Played at least one official NBA match at any time.

- (Rwanda) Aristide Mugabe
- (Rwanda) Walter Nkurunziza
- (Rwanda) Sedar Sagamba
- (Burundi) Jean de Dieu Niagunduka

== Honours ==
National Basketball League

- Winners (4): 2016, 2018, 2019, 2020

BAL

- Fourth Place (1): 2021

== Season by season ==
League champions	Playoff berth

Season	Tier	League	Regular season					Postseason	Cup competitions	Head coach
Season	Tier	League	Finish	Played	Wins	Losses	Win %	Postseason	Cup competitions	Head coach
Patriots BBC
2016–17	1	NBL	1st					Not held		Henry Mwinuka
2017–18	League not played									Henry Mwinuka
2018–19	1	NBL	1st	16	14	2	.875	Won semifinals (APR) 3–2; Won finals (REG) 4–3	Runners-up (HC)	Henry Mwinuka
2019–20	1	NBL	1st	3	3	0	1.000	Won semifinals (IPRC-Kigali) 88–59; Won finals (REG) 76–61		Carey Odhiambo
2020–21	1	NBL	1st	12	11	1	.917	Won quarterfinals (30 Plus) 106–61; Won semifinals (APR) 2–0; Lost finals (REG) 0–2	Cancelled	Dean Murray
2021–22	1	RBL	1st	24	22	2	.917	Won semifinals (Tigers) 2–0; Lost finals (REG) 2–3	Not organised	Ogolla Benson
2022–23	1	RBL	2nd	22	19	3	.864	Lost semifinals (APR) 0–2	Not organised	Henry Mwinuka
2023–24	1	RBL	1st	18	17	1	.944	Won semifinals (Kepler) 3–0 Lost finals (APR) 2–4	Semifinalist (RC)	Henry Mwinuka
2024–25	1	RBL	4th	16	10	6	.625	Lost quarterfinals (APR) 2–3 Lost third place game (UGB)	TBD	Sunny Niyomugabo
Regular season record				111	96	15	.865	4 NBL/RBL championships		
Playoffs record				46	23	20	.535			

== Head coaches ==
Coach	From	To	Honours
(Tanzania) Henry Mwinuka	December 2016	October 2019	4x NBL champion
(Kenya) Carey Odhiambo	November 2019	February 2020	
(United States) Dean Murray	February 2020	March 2021	1x NBL champion
(Kenya) Bernard Oluoch	March 2021	April 2021	
(United States) Alan Major	April 2021	May 2021	
(Kenya) Ogolla Benson	May 2021	December 2022	
(Tanzania) Henry Mwinuka	January 2023	December 2024	
(Rwanda) Sunny Niyomugabo	January 2025		
