= REG BBC =

REG
- Leagues: Rwanda Basketball League
- Founded: 2016
- History: REG BBC; 2016–present
- Arena: Amahoro Indoor Stadium; Kigali Arena
- Capacity: 2,500; 10,000
- Location: Kigali, Rwanda
- Main sponsor: Rwanda Energy Group Limited
- President: Francis Murindabigwi
- Team manager: Eric Bugingo
- Head coach: Charles Mushumba
- Team captain: Elie Kaje
- Ownership: Rwanda Energy Group Limited
- 2021 position: Rwandan NBL, 1st of 14
- Championships: 3 (2017, 2021, 2022)
Home	Away

Rwanda Energy Group BBC, commonly known as REG, is a Rwandan basketball club based in Kigali. It is owned and named after the company Rwanda Energy Group Limited. It plays in the Rwanda Basketball League (RBL), the highest tier of basketball in Rwanda. REG has won the national championship thrice, in 2017, 2021 and 2022.

The club played in the Sahara Conference of the Basketball Africa League (BAL) in 2022 and 2023, and was a quarter-finalist in both seasons. REG shares a rivalry with Patriots BBC.

== History ==
Established in 2016, the club won the NBL Rwanda in 2017. Then, REG played in an African competition for the first time when it entered the 2018–19 Africa Basketball League.

On 2 November 2019, Henry Mwinuka signed for two years as the new head coach.

On 30 October 2021, REG won its first Rwandan national championship after defeating arch-rivals Patriots 2–0 in the finals. Olivier Shyaka was named the league's Most Valuable Player after scoring 30 points in Game 1 and 22 points in Game 2. As a result of the championship, REG also qualified for the 2022 season of the Basketball Africa League (BAL). On February 18, 2022, the team signed ex-NBA player and coach Robert Pack as its new head coach.

The team won their third national title after once again defeating Patriots in the finals, 3–2, in the 2022 season. Subsequently, REG represented Rwanda in the BAL for the 2023 season and was once again a quarter-finalist, this time being eliminated by the later to be champions Al Ahly.

== Honours ==
Rwanda Basketball League

- Champions (3): 2017, 2021, 2022
  - Runners-up (3): 2018, 2019, 2020

Rwanda Cup

- Runners-up (2): 2024, 2025

Heroes Cup

- Winners (3): 2018, 2019, 2020

== Season by season ==
Season	Tier	League	Position	Heroes Cup	African competitions	
2016–17	1	NBL Rwanda / RBL	1st			
2017–18	1	NBL Rwanda / RBL	2nd	Winners		
2018–19	1	NBL Rwanda / RBL	2nd	Winners	Africa Basketball League	RS
2019–20	1	NBL Rwanda / RBL	2nd	Winners		
2020–21	1	NBL Rwanda / RBL	1st	Cancelled		
2021–22	1	NBL Rwanda / RBL	1st	Not held	BAL	QF
2022–23	1	NBL Rwanda / RBL	2nd		BAL	QF

- RS: Regular season
- QF: Quarterfinals

== In African competitions ==
FIBA Africa Basketball League (1 appearance)

2018–19 – Group Stage

Basketball Africa League (BAL) (2 appearances)

- 2022 – Quarterfinalist
- 2023 – Quarterfinalist

== Players ==
=== Current roster ===
The following roster is REG's final team for the 2022 BAL season.

REG BBC roster
Players
Coaches

Pos.	No.	Nat.	Name	Ht.	Age
PG	0	(Rwanda)	Filer, Adonis	1.88 m (6 ft 2 in)	32 – 11 July 1993
G	1	(Rwanda)	Vandriessche, Pierre	1.94 m (6 ft 4 in)	25 – 21 July 2000
SF	2	(Rwanda)	Ndizeye, Dieudonné	1.98 m (6 ft 6 in)	28 – 14 October 1996
G	5	(United States)	Thomas, Cleveland (I)	1.93 m (6 ft 4 in)	31 – 2 December 1993
SG	10	(Rwanda)	Shyaka, Olivier	1.98 m (6 ft 6 in)	30 – 14 August 1995
PG	11	(Rwanda)	Nshobozwabyosenumukiza, Wilson	1.83 m (6 ft 0 in)	27 – 26 July 1998
PG	12	(Nigeria)	Ighovodja, Joy (E)	1.90 m (6 ft 3 in)	20 – 12 October 2004
C	13	(Rwanda)	Kaje, Elie (C)	1.90 m (6 ft 3 in)	30 – 17 March 1995
G	15	(Rwanda)	Habimana, Ntore	1.96 m (6 ft 5 in)	28 – 15 August 1997
F/C	21	(Rwanda)	Mpoyo, Axel	2.01 m (6 ft 7 in)	28 – 5 January 1997
F/C	28	(Rwanda)	Kabange, Kami	2.03 m (6 ft 8 in)	41 – 2 July 1984
C	34	(Democratic Republic of the Congo)	Kambuy Manga, Pitchou (I)	2.08 m (6 ft 10 in)	36 – 12 December 1988
C	41	(United States)	Walker, Anthony (I)	2.06 m (6 ft 9 in)	32 – 22 July 1993

Head coach

- (United States) Robert Pack

Legend

- (C) Team captain
- (E): BAL Elevate player
- Injured

- Roster
Updated: March 8, 2022

=== Notable players ===
- (Rwanda) Kubwimana Kazingufu Ali (2018–)
- (United States) Cleveland Thomas
- (Rwanda) Kendall Gray (2024–present)
- (Democratic Republic of the Congo) Pitchou Kambuy Manga
- (Rwanda) Jean Jacques Nshobozwabyosenumukiza (2018–2022; 2023)
- (Rwanda) Dieudonné Ndizeye
- (Cameroon) Ulrich Chomche (2021)

== Head coaches ==
- (Tanzania) Henry Mwinuka: (2019–2022)
- (United States) Robert Pack: (2022 BAL season)
- (Tanzania) Henry Mwinuka: (2022–2023)
- (United States) Dean Murray: (2023)
- (Rwanda) Charles Mushumba: (2023–present)

== Women's team ==
Their women's team will take part in the 2023 Africa Women's Basketball League.
