= Road to BAL =

- Organising body: FIBA Africa
- Founded: 2019; 6 years ago
- First season: 2021
- Confederation: FIBA Africa
- Number of teams: 25 (2026 season)
- Current champions: West Division: (Libya) Al Ahly Ly (1st title); East Division: (Kenya) Nairobi City Thunder (2nd title) (2026)
- Most championships: (South Africa) Cape Town Tigers & (Kenya) Nairobi City Thunder (2 titles)
- TV partners: YouTube; Courtside 1891
- Website: Link
- 2026 BAL qualification

The Road to BAL, also known as the BAL Qualifying Tournaments, are the qualifying tournaments of the Basketball Africa League (BAL). While the main tournament is co-organised by FIBA and the NBA, the organization of the qualifiers is completely done by FIBA. The first qualifying rounds began on 16 October 2019 during the 2021 BAL qualification.

The qualifiers are geographically divided into the West and East Division, with three teams qualifying out of each division. Semi-finals and finals are played to determine the winners of the qualifying tournaments.

== History ==
The first BAL qualifying game was played on October 16, 2019, in the qualification for the 2021 season. The City Oilers from Uganda defeated Dynamo 71–57 in Dar es Salaam.

During the second season, the name "Road to BAL" was used for the first time, which would later become the event name.

The following years, the competition was held in different venues in several countries, but held the same format which led to six teams qualifying for the main tournament.

== Format ==
The national champions of each national federation (associated with FIBA Africa) can sign up for the BAL qualifiers.

In the inaugural edition, a total of 31 teams from 31 countries participate in the qualifying tournaments to determine which six teams will play in the 2020 BAL regular season, along with six directly placed six teams.

The qualifying tournaments are divided into the first round and the Elite 16; teams are also divided into the East Division and the West Division. Out of each division, three teams advance to the main tournament.

== Venues ==
The qualifying rounds are usually played in groups of four to six teams that play each other once in a venue in a pre-determined location. The following arenas have hosted at least one group in either the first round or elite 16:

List of venues that have hosted one or more Road to BAL phase or group (2021–present)
Venue	City	Country	Seasons hosted
Ellis Park Arena	Johannesburg	South Africa	1 (2023)
Wembley Stadium	Johannesburg	South Africa	2 (2021, 2022)
Palais des Sports de Treichville	Abidjan	Ivory Coast	3 (2023, 2025, 2026)
Palais du 29 Juillet	Niamey	Niger	1 (2023)
Palais des Sports Mahamasina	Antananarivo	Madagascar	2 (2021, 2023)
Palais des Sports du 28 Septembre	Conakry	Guinea	1 (2022)
National Indoor Stadium	Dar es Salaam	Tanzania	3 (2022–2024, 2026)
The Filbert Bayi Olympafrica Centre	Kibaha	Tanzania	1 (2025)
Kigali Arena	Kigali	Rwanda	1 (2021)
Yaoundé Multipurpose Sports Complex	Yaoundé	Cameroon	3 (2021–2023)
Palais des Sports Salamatou Maïga	Bamako	Mali	2 (2021, 2026)
Palais des Sports de Cotonou	Cotonou	Benin	1 (2021)
Palais des Sports de Libreville	Libreville	Gabon	1 (2021)
Tripoli Great Hall	Tripoli	Libya	1 (2025)
Japoma Multisports Complex Gymnasium	Douala	Cameroon	1 (2025)
City Sports Center	Harare	Zimbabwe	1 (2025)
Kasarani Indoor Arena	Nairobi	Kenya	2 (2025, 2026)
Gymnase Multisports de la Police Nationale C	Kinshasa	Democratic Republic of the Congo	1 (2026)
NASDEC Sports Complex	Lusaka	Zambia	1 (2026)
Pavilhão Desportivo Vavá Duarte	Praia	Cape Verde	1 (2026)

== Results ==
Qualified for the Basketball Africa League proper

=== East Division ===
Ed.	Year	Finals host	First place game			Third place game			Num. teams	Ref.
Ed.	Year	Finals host	Winners	Score	Runners-up	Third place	Score	Fourth place	Num. teams	Ref.
1	2021	Kigali	(Rwanda) Patriots BBC	94–63	(Madagascar) GNBC	(Mozambique) Ferroviário de Maputo	74–57	(Uganda) City Oilers	16	
2	2022	Johannesburg	(Mozambique) Ferroviário da Beira	91–65	(South Sudan) Cobra Sport	(South Africa) Cape Town Tigers	20–0 (Note: Players of New Star tested positive for COVID-19 and thus were given the automatic loss.)	(Burundi) New Star	10 (Note: In the 2022 BAL qualification, initially 26 teams would participate but six teams withdrew.)	
3	2023	Johannesburg	(South Africa) Cape Town Tigers	81–71	(Mozambique) Ferroviário da Beira	(Uganda) City Oilers	71–62	(Burundi) Urunani	10 (Note: In 2023, 21 teams participated after 8 teams withdrew.)	
4	2024	Johannesburg	(South Africa) Cape Town Tigers	70–68	(Uganda) City Oilers	(Burundi) Dynamo	79–78	(Madagascar) COSPN	14	
5	2025	Nairobi	(Kenya) Nairobi City Thunder	99–86	(Cape Verde) Kriol Star	(Burundi) Urunani	77–75	(Uganda) City Oilers	14	
6	2026	Nairobi	(Kenya) Nairobi City Thunder	94–84	(South Africa) Johannesburg Giants	(Tanzania) Dar City	92–77	(Mozambique) Ferroviário da Beira	9	

=== West Division ===
Ed.	Year	Finals host	First place game			Third place game			Num. teams	Ref.
Ed.	Year	Finals host	Winners	Score	Runners-up	Third place	Score	Fourth place	Num. teams	Ref.
1	2021	Yaoundé	(Algeria) GS Pétroliers	92–88	(Cameroon) FAP	(Mali) AS Police	71–69	(Ivory Coast) ABC Fighters	13	
2	2022	Yaoundé	(Cameroon) FAP	81–34	(Guinea) SLAC	(Democratic Republic of the Congo) Espoir Fukash	93–87 (OT)	(Mali) AS Police	8 (Note: In the 2022 BAL qualification, initially 26 teams would participate but six teams withdrew.)	
3	2023	Abidjan	(Ivory Coast) ABC Fighters	81–70	(Guinea) SLAC	(Mali) Stade Malien	62–59	(Central African Republic) Bangui Sporting Club	10 (Note: In 2023, 21 teams participated after 8 teams withdrew.)	
4	2024	Yaoundé	(Central African Republic) Bangui Sporting Club	93–90	(Morocco) FUS Rabat	(Libya) Al Ahly Benghazi	93–84	(Cameroon) FAP	9	
5	2025	Abidjan	(Libya) Al Ahli Tripoli	71–68	(Mali) Stade Malien	(Ivory Coast) ABC Fighters	92–53	(Cameroon) KSA	12	
6	2026	Praia	(Libya) Al Ahli Ly	105–92	(Ivory Coast) JCA Abidjan	(Mali) CRB Tombouctou	90–64	(Ghana) Spintex Knights	11	

=== Performance by country ===
As of November 2024, 13 different clubs from 12 countries have qualified for the BAL's main tournament. As of the 2023 season, Nigeria, Rwanda, Egypt, Senegal and Tunisia are given a bye for the qualifiers as they qualify directly for the BAL. In 2021, Morocco was also given an automatic spot.

Rank	Nation	Gold	Silver	Bronze	Total
1	South Africa	2	1	1	4
2	Libya	2	0	1	3
3	Kenya	2	0	0	2
4	Ivory Coast	1	1	1	3
4	Mozambique	1	1	1	3
6	Cameroon	1	1	0	2
7	Algeria	1	0	0	1
7	Central African Republic	1	0	0	1
7	Rwanda	1	0	0	1
10	Guinea	0	2	0	2
11	Mali	0	1	3	4
12	Uganda	0	1	1	2
13	Cape Verde	0	1	0	1
13	Madagascar	0	1	0	1
13	Morocco	0	1	0	1
13	South Sudan	0	1	0	1
17	Burundi	0	0	2	2
18	DR Congo	0	0	1	1
18	Tanzania	0	0	1	1
Totals (19 entries)		12	12	12	36

== All-time participants ==
The following is a list of clubs who have played in the BAL Qualifying Tournaments at any time since its formation in 2019, or will play in the upcoming season.

Defunct	Defunct teams
1st	Champions
2nd	Runners-up
3rd	Third place
SF	Semi-finalists
E16	Elite 16
R1	First round
W	Withdrew

Team	21	22	23	24	25	26	Total seasons	Times qualified
(Algeria) GS Pétroliers	1st place, gold medalist(s)	–	–	–	–	–	1	1
(Algeria) WA Boufarik	–	W	–	–	–	–	–	–
(Botswana) Dolphins	R1	–	–	R1	–	R1	3	–
(Benin) ASPAC	R1	E16	–	–	–	–	2	–
(Benin) Elan Coton	–	–	R1	R1	R1	R1	4	–
(Burkina Faso) AOA	–	W	–	–	–	–	–	–
(Burkina Faso) AS Douanes	–	–	–	–	–	R1	1	–
(Burkina Faso) USFA	–	–	–	–	W	–	–	–
(Central African Republic) Abeilles	W	–	–	–	R1	–	2	–
(Central African Republic) Tondema	–	R1	–	–	–	–	1	–
(Central African Republic) Bangui Sporting Club	–	–	4th	1st place, gold medalist(s)	–	–	2	1
(Central African Republic) New Tech Bantou	–	–	–	–	–	E16 (Note: New Tech Bantou withdrew from the Elite 16 after it failed to travel to Praia in time.)	1	–
(Chad) Lamantins	–	–	–	R1 (Note: Lamantins from Chad forfeited during their first game and were subsequently disqualified in the 2024 qualifying tournament.)	–	–	1	–
(Chad) Tempo	–	–	W	–	–	–	–	–
(Comoros) Djabal	–	–	R1	–	–	R1	2	–
(Comoros) Usoni	R1	–	–	–	–	–	1	–
(Comoros) Ushindzi	–	–	–	R1	W	–	1	–
(Ivory Coast) ABC Fighters	4th	–	1st place, gold medalist(s)	E16	3rd place, bronze medalist(s)	–	3	1
(Ivory Coast) SOA	–	E16	–	–	–	–	1	–
(Ivory Coast) Jeunesse Club d'Abidjan	–	–	–	–	–	2nd place, silver medalist(s)	1	1
(Cameroon) FAP	2nd place, silver medalist(s)	1st place, gold medalist(s)	E16	4th	–	–	4	1
(Cameroon) KSA	–	–	–	–	4th	–	1	–
(Cameroon) BEAC	–	–	–	–	–	W	–	–
(Democratic Republic of the Congo) Chaux Sport	–	–	–	–	E16	–	1	–
(Democratic Republic of the Congo) Mazembe	E16	–	–	–	–	–	1	–
(Democratic Republic of the Congo) Espoir Fukash	–	3rd place, bronze medalist(s)	–	–	–	–	1	1
(Democratic Republic of the Congo) Vita Club	–	–	W	–	–	–	–	–
(Democratic Republic of the Congo) Virunga	–	–	–	R1	–	–	1	–
(Democratic Republic of the Congo) New Generation	–	–	–	–	–	E16	1	–
(Cape Verde) Prédio	–	W	–	–	–	–	–	–
(Cape Verde) Kriol Star	–	–	–	–	R1	E16	2	–
(Gabon) Manga BB	E16	–	–	–	–	–	1	–
(Gabon) Moanda	–	–	–	–	E16	E16	2	–
(Gabon) Espoir	–	–	R1	R1	–	–	2	–
(Guinea) SLAC	R1	2nd place, silver medalist(s)	2nd place, silver medalist(s)	E16	–	–	4	2
(Guinea) Centre Fédéral de Guinée	–	–	–	–	–	R1	1	–
(Equatorial Guinea) Virgen María de África	R1	–	–	–	–	–	1	–
(Equatorial Guinea) Nueva Era	–	–	E16	–	–	–	1	–
(Equatorial Guinea) Malabo Kings	–	W	–	–	–	–	–	–
(Ghana) Braves of Customs	R1	–	–	–	–	–	1	–
(Ghana) Reformers of Prisons	–	–	W	–	–	–	–	–
(Ghana) Spintex Knights	–	–	–	–	E16	4th	2	–
(Ethiopia) Hawassa City	R1	W		–	W	–	1	–
(Uganda) City Oilers	4th	E16	3rd place, bronze medalist(s)	2nd place, silver medalist(s)	4th	–	5	2
(Uganda) Namuwongo Blazers	–	–	–	–	–	E16	1	–
(Mali) AS Police	3rd place, bronze medalist(s)	4th	–	–	–	–	2	1
(Mali) Stade Malien	–	–	3rd place, bronze medalist(s)	W	2nd place, silver medalist(s)	–	2	2
(Mali) CRB Tombouctou	–	–	–	–	–	3rd place, bronze medalist(s)	1	–
(Tanzania) ABC (Army)	–	–	R1	–	–	–	1	–
(Tanzania) JKT	E16	–	–	–	R1	–	1	–
(Tanzania) Kurasini Heat	–	E16	–	–	–	–	1	–
(Tanzania) Pazi	–	–	–	E16	–	–	1	–
(Tanzania) Dar City	–	–	–	–	–	3rd place, bronze medalist(s)	1	1
(South Sudan) Cobra Sport	E16	2nd place, silver medalist(s)	W	–	–	–	2	–
(South Sudan) Fox	–	–	–	–	R1	–	1	–
(Burundi) Dynamo	R1	–	–	3rd place, bronze medalist(s)	–	W	2	–
(Burundi) New Star	–	4th	–	–	–	–	1	–
(Burundi) Urunani	–	–	4th	–	3rd place, bronze medalist(s)	–	2	–
(South Africa) Jozi Nuggets	R1	–	–	–	–	–	1	–
(South Africa) Cape Town Tigers	–	3rd place, bronze medalist(s)	1st place, gold medalist(s)	1st place, gold medalist(s)	–	–	3	3
(South Africa) Johannesburg Giants	–	–	–	–	–	2nd place, silver medalist(s)	1	1
(Mozambique) Costa do Sol	–	–	–	–	R1	–	1	–
(Mozambique) Ferroviário de Maputo	3rd place, bronze medalist(s)	–	–	–	–	–	1	1
(Mozambique) Ferroviário da Beira	–	1st place, gold medalist(s)	2nd place, silver medalist(s)	E16	–	4th	4	2
(Mauritius) Roche-Bois Warriors	–	R1	W		–	–	1	–
(Namibia) Lions	R1	–	–	–	–	–	1	–
(Seychelles) Beau Vallon Heat	R1	–	–	R1	R1	–	2	–
(Libya) Al Ahly Ly	–	–	–	3rd place, bronze medalist(s)	–	1st place, gold medalist(s)	2	2
(Libya) Al Ahli Tripoli	–	–	–	–	1st place, gold medalist(s)	–	1	1
(Libya) Al-Nasr Benghazi	E16	–	–	–	–	–	1	–
(Morocco) AS Salé	–	W	E16	–	–	–	1	–
(Morocco) FUS Rabat	–	–	–	2nd place, silver medalist(s)	–	–	1	1
(Madagascar) ASCUT	–	W	–	–	–	–	–	–
(Madagascar) COSPN	–	–	E16	4th	–	W	2	–
(Madagascar) GNBC	2nd place, silver medalist(s)	–	–	–	R1	–	2	1
(Malawi) Brave Hearts	–	R1	–	W	E16	R1	3	–
(Kenya) Nairobi City Thunder	–	–	–	–	1st place, gold medalist(s)	1st place, gold medalist(s)	2	2
(Kenya) KPA	E16	–	E16	R1	–	–	3	–
(Kenya) Ulinzi Warriors	–	E16	–	–	–	–	1	–
(Zambia) Matero Magic	–	E16	E16	–	E16	E16	4	–
(Zambia) Munali Suns	–	–	–	R1	–	–	1	–
(Zambia) UNZA Pacers	E16	–	–	–	–	–	1	–
(Niger) Nigelec	E16	E16	R1	W	–	–	3	–
(Liberia) Mighty Barrolle	–	–	–	–	R1	–	1	–
(Liberia) NPA Pythons	R1	–	–	–	–	–	1	–
(Liberia) LPRC Oilers	–	–	–	–	–	R1	1	–
(Rwanda) Patriots	1st place, gold medalist(s)	–	–	–	–	–	1	1
(Zimbabwe) JBC	–	–	–	E16	–	–	1	–
(Zimbabwe) Hounds	–	–	–	–	R1	R1	2	–
(Zimbabwe) Mercenaries	R1	W	–	–	–	–	1	–
(Zimbabwe) Vixens-Foxes	–	–	W	–	–	–	1	–
NBA Academy Africa (Note: The NBA Academy Africa has joined the competition since 2023, but is ineligible to advance as they represent the NBA.)	–	–	E16	E16	Q	–	3	–

== All-time record by club ==
As of 8 October 2022.

Club	Years	Pld	W	L	4th	3rd	RU	W
(Cameroon) FAP	3	17	13	4	–	–	1	1
(Ivory Coast) ABC	3	17	11	6	1	–	–	1
(Rwanda) Patriots	1	9	9	0	–	–	–	1
(Mozambique) Ferroviário de Maputo	1	10	8	2	–	1	–	–
(Mali) AS Police	2	14	7	7	1	1	–	–
(Uganda) City Oilers	2	11	7	4	1	–	–	–
(Guinea) SLAC	3	14	6	8	–	–	2	–
(Madagascar) GNBC	1	9	6	3	–	–	1	–
(Algeria) GS Pétroliers	1	8	6	2	–	–	–	1
(Mali) Stade Malien	1	8	6	2	–	1	–	–
(Kenya) KPA	1	7	6	1	–	–	–	–
(Mozambique) Ferroviário da Beira	1	7	6	1	–	–	–	1
(Niger) Nigelec	3	17	5	12	–	–	–	–
(Zambia) UNZA Pacers	1	8	5	3	–	–	–	–
(South Africa) Cape Town Tigers	1	7	5	2	–	1	–	–
(Central African Republic) Bangui Sporting Club	1	6	5	1	1	–	–	–
(South Sudan) Cobra Sport	2	13	4	9	–	–	1	–
(Burundi) New Star	1	6	4	2	1	–	–	–
(Gabon) Manga BB	1	6	4	2	–	–	–	–
(Democratic Republic of the Congo) Espoir Fukash	1	6	3	3	–	1	–	–
(Libya) Al-Nasr Benghazi	1	3	3	3	–	–	–	–
(Zimbabwe) Mercenaries	1	5	3	2	–	–	–	–
(Benin) Elan Coton	1	6	2	4	–	–	–	–
(Tanzania) JKT	1	7	2	5	–	–	–	–
(Benin) ASPAC	2	6	2	4	–	–	–	–
(Ivory Coast) SOA	1	4	2	2	–	–	–	–
(Zambia) Matero Magic	3	8	1	7	–	–	–	–
(Democratic Republic of the Congo) Mazembe	1	6	1	5	–	–	–	–
(Equatorial Guinea) Nueva Era	1	5	1	4	–	–	–	–
(Central African Republic) Tondema	1	5	1	4	–	–	–	–
(South Africa) Jozi Nuggets	1	5	1	4	–	–	–	–
(Namibia) Lions	1	5	1	4	–	–	–	–
(Botswana) Dolphins	1	5	1	4	–	–	–	–
(Burundi) Dynamo	1	4	1	3	–	–	–	–
(Ghana) Braves of Customs	1	4	1	3	–	–	–	–
(Kenya) Ulinzi Warriors	1	4	1	3	–	–	–	–
(Liberia) NPA Pythons	1	4	1	3	–	–	–	–
(Seychelles) Beau Vallon Heat	1	4	1	3	–	–	–	–
(Morocco) AS Salé	1	3	1	2	–	–	–	–
(Tanzania) ABC	1	3	1	2	–	–	–	–
(Ethiopia) Hawassa City	1	4	0	4	–	–	–	–
(Comoros) Usoni	1	4	0	4	–	–	–	–
(Equatorial Guinea) Virgen María de África	1	3	0	3	–	–	–	–
(Mauritius) Roche-Bois Warriors	1	3	0	3	–	–	–	–
(Central African Republic) Tondema	1	2	0	2	–	–	–	–
(Malawi) Brave Hearts	1	2	0	2	–	–	–	–
(Comoros) Djabal Iconi	1	2	0	2	–	–	–	–
(Gabon) Espoir	1	2	0	2	–	–	–	–

== Records ==
=== Team records ===
- Best performance by record:
  - Patriots in the 2019 qualification (9–0)
- Largest win
  - 96 points difference (Ferroviário da Beira 132–36 Roche-Bois Warriors) on October 22, 2021
  - 83 points difference (Djabal Iconi 37–120 KPA) on October 22, 2022
  - 77 points difference (KPA 131–54 Usoni Club) on November 1, 2019
- Most points scored in a game
  - 131 by KPA (131–54 vs. Usoni Club) on November 1, 2019
- Fewest points scored in a game
  - 36 by Roche-Bois Warriors (vs. Ferroviário da Beira) on October 30, 2019

=== Individual records ===
- Most points scored in a game
  - 55 by Raphiael Putney, Dar City (vs. Djabal Iconi) on October 17, 2025
- Most rebounds in a game
  - 26 by Michael Mukumbutaa, Lions Windhoek (vs. UNZA Pacers) on October 27, 2019
  - 22 by Ameh Eric Ejeh, ASPAC (vs. Nigelec) on October 30, 2019
- Most assists in a game
  - 12 by Stephane Mshana, JKT (vs. Dynamo) on October 20, 2019
  - 12 by Solo Diabate, Al Ahly Benghazi (vs. FAP) on November 5, 2023
- Most steals in a game
  - 9 by Abdoulaye Harouna, Nigelec (vs. FAP) on November 28, 2019
- Most blocks in a game
  - 9 by Frank Kamndoh Betoudji, Virunga (vs. FAP) on October 9, 2023
- Most 3-point field goals made in a game
  - 9 by Timothy Kwaor, Nigelec (vs. NPA Pythons) on November 1, 2019
- Oldest player to play in a game
  - James Truman Bedeah, Mighty Barrolle at 45 years old in the 2025 BAL qualification
