= 2021 BAL season =

Inaugural season of the Basketball Africa League

- League: Basketball Africa League
- Season: 2021
- Dates: 16 – 30 May 2021
- Games played: 26
- Teams: 12

Regular season
- Season MVP: Walter Hodge (Zamalek)

Finals
- Champions: (Egypt) Zamalek (1st title)
- Runners-up: (Tunisia) US Monastir
- Third place: (Angola) Petro de Luanda
- Fourth place: (Rwanda) Patriots

Statistical leaders
Points	Terrell Stoglin (AS Salé)	30.8
Rebounds	Ibrahima Thomas (Police)	12.0
Assists	Myck Kabongo (Ferroviário)	6.8

Records
- Biggest home win: 47 points GNBC 66–113 US Monastir (12 May 2021)
- Winning streak: 6 games Zamalek
- Highest attendance: 1,789; US Monastir 63–76 Zamalek (30 May 2021)

Seasons
- ← 2019 (FIBA ABL) 2022 (Season 2) →

The 2021 BAL season, also known as BAL Season 1, was the inaugural season of the Basketball Africa League (BAL). Established as a joint effort between the National Basketball Association (NBA) and FIBA, the BAL is the highest tier continental league of Africa, replacing the FIBA Africa Basketball League. Due to the COVID-19 pandemic, the BAL held its inaugural season one year later as planned, with the season beginning in 2021. Initially the league planned to play in six venues in six countries; however, due to the pandemic the season was held in a bio-secure bubble in Kigali, Rwanda. The season began on 16 May 2021 and ended on 30 May 2021.

The qualifying rounds for the season were held from 16 October to 21 December 2019, with national champion of each African country has the opportunity to qualify through the qualifying rounds. Meanwhile, six national champions directly qualified for the regular season to make a total of twelve teams in the main tournament.

Zamalek won the first-ever BAL championship after beating US Monastir in the finals and going undefeated over the season.

== Organisation ==
The plans to establish the BAL by FIBA and the NBA were first revealed in February 2019 during the 2019 NBA All-Star Game.

In August 2019, the seven host cities for the BAL season were announced. Additionally, it was revealed that the inaugural BAL Final Four would be played in the Kigali Arena in Kigali, Rwanda. BAL president Amadou Gallo Fall, later announced at the NBA All-Star 2020 Africa Luncheon in Chicago, that the season was planned to tip off on 13 March 2020. On 20 February 2020, it was announced that the 12 teams were to be drawn in two conferences, named the Sahara and Nile Conferences.

=== Impact of the COVID-19 pandemic ===
On 3 March 2020, the BAL announced it was postponing its inaugural season due to the COVID-19 pandemic. The decision was made following recommendations of the Senegalese government.

In November, the start of the inaugural season was delayed for a second time and the new season was moved to a later to be announced date in 2021. In March it was announced the league would commence in May 2021. The complete event was rescheduled to be held in the Kigali Arena and the regular season changed its format from two groups to three groups of four. All twelve teams were hosted in a bio-secure bubble in which all players were regularly tested for COVID-19. All games were broadcast live by ESPN Africa.

== Qualification ==
The twelve teams for the inaugural BAL season had to qualify in their domestic competitions to be able to play in the league, similar to other FIBA-organised competitions. Six teams qualified directly as their national champions while an additional six teams qualified through regional qualifying tournaments.

=== Direct qualification ===
FIBA announced that the national champions of six member associations would be directly qualified for the regular season. These teams are from countries which are also hosts cities for the regular season, except for Final Four host Rwanda. On 23 October 2019, AS Douanes won the Senegalese national championship, becoming the first club to qualify.

Directly qualified teams

No.	Country	Team	Notes
1	Angola	Petro de Luanda	Directly Qualified
2	Egypt	Zamalek	Directly Qualified
3	Morocco	AS Salé	Directly Qualified

No.	Country	Team	Notes
4	Nigeria	Rivers Hoopers	Directly Qualified
5	Senegal	AS Douanes	Directly Qualified
6	Tunisia	US Monastir	Directly Qualified

=== Qualifying tournaments ===
Each of the FIBA Africa member associations was able to register one team from its country to participate in the qualifying tournaments. A total of 31 teams played in the first round, which was divided into six groups in six different host cities. The qualification tournaments started on 16 October and will end 21 December 2019.

Teams and countries playing in the 2020 BAL Qualifying Tournaments

No.	Country	Team	Notes
1	Algeria	GS Pétroliers	Qualified
2	Benin	ASPAC	
3	Botswana	Dolphins	
4	Burundi	Dynamo	
5	Cameroon	FAP	Qualified
6	CAF	Abeilles	Withdrew
7	Comoros	Usoni	
8	DR Congo	ASB Mazembe	
9	Ethiopia	Hawassa City	
10	Gabon	Manga	
11	Ghana	Braves of Customs	
12	Guinea	SLAC	
13	Ivory Coast	ABC	
14	Kenya	KPA	
15	Liberia	NPA Pythons	
16	Libya	Al-Nasr Benghazi	

No.	Country	Team	Notes
17	Madagascar	GNBC	Qualified
18	Malawi	Brave Hearts	Withdrew
19	Mali	AS Police	Qualified
20	Mozambique	Ferroviário de Maputo	Qualified
21	Namibia	Lions Club	
22	Niger	AS Nigelec	
23	Rwanda	Patriots	Qualified
24	Seychelles	Beau Vallon Heat	
25	South Africa	Jozi Nuggets	
26	South Sudan	Cobra	
27	Tanzania	JKT	
28	Uganda	City Oilers	
29	Zambia	UNZA Pacers	
30	Zimbabwe	Mercenaries	
31	Equatorial Guinea	Virgen Maria de Africa	

== Teams ==
=== Qualified teams ===
Team	Home city	Qualified as	Qualified on
(Tunisia) US Monastir	Monastir, Tunisia	Winners of the 2018–19 Championnat National A	1 May 2019
(Egypt) Zamalek	Cairo, Egypt	Winners of the 2018–19 Egyptian Super League	4 May 2019
(Angola) Petro de Luanda	Luanda, Angola	Winners of the 2018–19 Angolan Basketball League	25 May 2019
(Morocco) AS Salé	Salé, Morocco	Winners of the 2018–19 Division Excellence	30 May 2019
(Senegal) AS Douanes	Dakar, Senegal	Winners of the 2019 Nationale 1 season	23 October 2019
(Nigeria) Rivers Hoopers	Port Harcourt, Nigeria	Winners of the 2019 NBBF President Cup	17 November 2019
(Algeria) GS Pétroliers	Algiers, Algeria	West Division winners	30 November 2019
(Cameroon) FAP	Yaoundé, Cameroon	West Division runners-up	30 November 2019
(Mali) AS Police	Bamako, Mali	West Division third place	1 December 2019
(Rwanda) Patriots	Kigali, Rwanda	East Division winners	21 December 2019
(Madagascar) GNBC	Antsirabe, Madagascar	East Division runners-up	21 December 2019
(Mozambique) Ferroviário de Maputo	Maputo, Mozambique	East Division third place	22 December 2019

=== Personnel and sponsorship ===
Team	Head coach	Team captain
AS Douanes	(Senegal) Pabi Gueye	(Senegal) Alkaly Ndour
AS Salé	(Morocco) Said El Bouzidi	(Morocco) Zakaria El Masbahi
AS Police	(Mali) Babacar Kanouté	(Mali) Badra Samaké
FAP	(Cameroon) Lazare Adingono	(Cameroon) Ebaku Akumenzoh
Ferroviário de Maputo	(Mozambique) Milagre Macome	(Mozambique) Custódio Muchate
GNBC	(Madagascar) Lova Navalona Raharidera	(Madagascar) Francis Mory
GS Pétroliers	(Algeria) Sofiane Boulahia	(Algeria) Mustapha Adrar
Patriots	(United States) Alan Major	(Rwanda) Aristide Mugabe
Petro de Luanda	(Brazil) José Neto	(Angola) Leonel Paulo
Rivers Hoopers	(Nigeria) Ogoh Odaudu	(Nigeria) Belema Alamin
US Monastir	(Tunisia) Mounir Ben Slimane	(Tunisia) Radhouane Slimane
Zamalek	(Spain) Augustí Julbe	(Egypt) Haytham Elsaharty

=== Foreign players ===
In line with league rules, each BAL team was allowed to have four foreign players on its roster, including only two non-African players.

Team
Team	Player 1	Player 2	Player 3	Player 4
AS Douanes	(United States) Chris Cokley	(Egypt) Hassan Attia	(Libya) Mohamed Sadi	—N/a
AS Salé	(United States) Ra'Shad James	(United States) Terrell Stoglin	(Central African Republic) Johndre Jefferson	—N/a
AS Police	(Senegal) Ibrahima Thomas	(Nigeria) Jawachi Nzeakor	(United States) Mylo Mitchell	—N/a
FAP	(Niger) Abdoulaye Harouna	(United States) Marcus Thomas	(United States) Matthew Hezekiah	—N/a
Ferroviário de Maputo	(Ivory Coast) Adjehi Baru	(Spain) Álvaro Calvo Masa	(United States) Demarcus Holland	(Democratic Republic of the Congo) Myck Kabongo
GNBC	(United States) Cameron Ridley	—N/a	—N/a	—N/a
GS Pétroliers	—N/a	—N/a	—N/a	—N/a
Patriots	(United States) Jermaine Cole	(Kenya) Bush Wamukota	(United States) Brandon Costner	—N/a
Petro de Luanda	(United Kingdom) Ryan Richards	(United States) Antwan Scott	—N/a	—N/a
Rivers Hoopers	(Uganda) Robinson Opong	(United States) Chris Daniels	(United States) Taren Sullivan	—N/a
US Monastir	(South Sudan) Ater Majok	(Lebanon) Wael Arakji	(United States) Chris Crawford	—N/a
Zamalek	(Nigeria) Chinemelu Elonu	(Nigeria) Michael Fakuade	(United States Virgin Islands) Walter Hodge	(Ivory Coast) Mouloukou Diabate

== Venues ==
Location of venues of the 2020 BAL season.
Red: Sahara Conference; Yellow: Nile Conference; Grey: Playoffs & Finals.

On 1 August 2019, the NBA announced the seven host cities for the regular season. Six cities in six countries would host the regular season games, with three assigned to each conference. The Kigali Arena in Kigali, Rwanda was announced as the venue for the inaugural Final Four. Because of the COVID-19 pandemic outbreak, it was later decided that the entire event was to be played at the Kigali Arena.

Proposed venues of the inaugural BAL season before the format change
Arena	Capacity	Location
Dakar Arena	15,000	Dakar, Senegal
Cairo Stadium Indoor Halls Complex	16,500	Cairo, Egypt
Salle El Bouâzzaoui	2,000	Salé, Morocco
Kilamba Arena	12,270	Luanda, Angola
Kigali Arena (Final Four)	10,000	Kigali, Rwanda
National Stadium	3,000	Lagos, Nigeria
Mohamed-Mzali Sports Hall	4,075	Monastir, Tunisia

== Schedule ==
Phase	Round	Draw date	Games
Qualifying	First round	9 October 2019	15 October – 3 November 2019
Qualifying	Elite 16	21 November 2019	26 November – 22 December 2019
Group phase		29 March 2021	16–24 May 2021
Playoffs	Quarter-finals	29 March 2021	26–27 May 2021
Playoffs	Semi-finals	29 March 2021	29 May 2021
Playoffs	Final and third place	29 March 2021	30 May 2021

== Qualifying tournaments ==
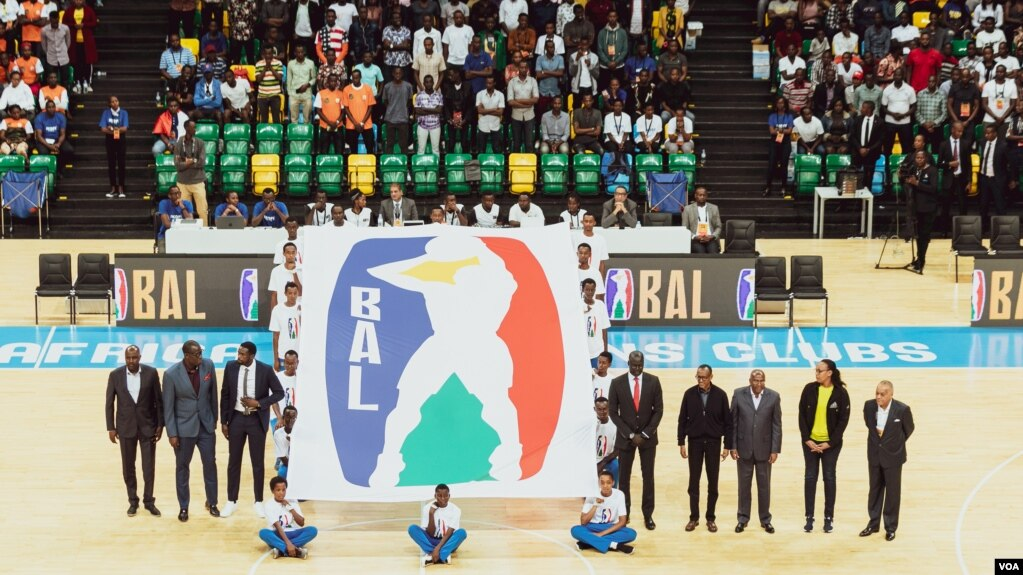
The official reveal of the Basketball Africa League logo during the qualifiers in Kigali

In the qualifying rounds, 32 teams from 32 countries participated in the West and East Division. The first round began 15 October and ended 3 November 2019, with sixteen teams advancing to the second round. The second-round games began 26 November and will end 22 December 2019, with six teams qualifying for the regular season.

== Group phase ==
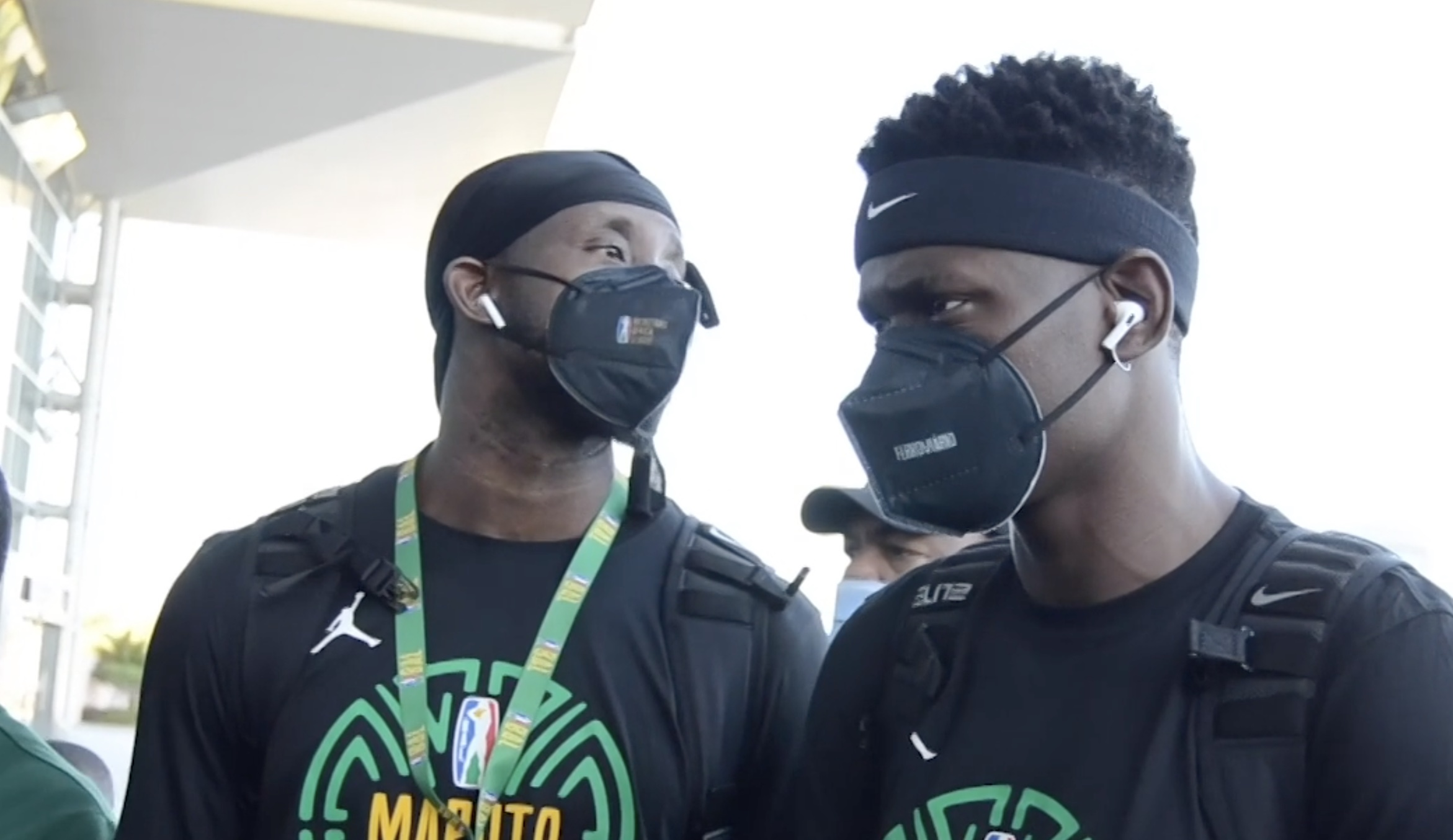
BAL players wearing masks due to the measurements taken against COVID-19 at the tournament

The group phase began on 16 May 2021 and ended on 24 May 2021. Initially, it was planned that in the regular season, the twelve teams would play in two Conferences with six teams each. Each team would play five games, one against each opponent, inside its conference. The top three teams from each conference would advance to the Super 6. The regular season would be played in six arenas divided over the African continent.

The format was changed to a group phase as a result of the COVID-19 pandemic, which was completely played at the Kigali Arena. In three groups of four each team plays the other one time and the first, second and best third-placed teams advance to the playoffs.

=== Group A ===
Pos	Team	Pld	W	L	PF	PA	PD	Pts	Qualification	USM	PAT	RIV	GNB
1	(Tunisia) US Monastir	3	3	0	303	211	+92	6	Advance to playoffs	—	—	91–75	—
2	(Rwanda) Patriots (H)	3	2	1	236	223	+13	5	Advance to playoffs	—	—	83–60	78–72
3	(Nigeria) Rivers Hoopers	3	1	2	210	251	−41	4		70–99	—	—	—
4	(Madagascar) GNBC	3	0	3	207	271	−64	3		66–113	—	69–80	—

Source: BAL
Legend: Blue = home team win; Red = away team win.
(H) Hosts

=== Group B ===
Pos	Team	Pld	W	L	PF	PA	PD	Pts	Qualification	PDL	ASS	FAP	POL
1	(Angola) Petro de Luanda	3	3	0	247	208	+39	6	Advance to playoffs	—	97–78	—	84–66
2	(Morocco) AS Salé	3	2	1	253	260	−7	5	Advance to playoffs	—	—	87–84	88–79
3	(Cameroon) FAP	3	1	2	235	218	+17	4	Advance to playoffs	64–66	—	—	87–65
4	(Mali) AS Police	3	0	3	210	259	−49	3			—	—	—

Source: BAL
Legend: Blue = home team win; Red = away team win.

=== Group C ===
Pos	Team	Pld	W	L	PF	PA	PD	Pts	Qualification	ZAM	FVM	ASD	GSP
1	(Egypt) Zamalek	3	3	0	254	181	+73	6	Advance to playoffs	—	71–55	—	97–64
2	(Mozambique) Ferroviário de Maputo	3	2	1	229	218	+11	5	Advance to playoffs	—	—	88–74	—
3	(Senegal) AS Douanes	3	1	2	230	250	−20	4	Advance to playoffs	62–86	—	—	94–76
4	(Algeria) GS Pétroliers	3	0	3	213	277	−64	3		—	73–86	—	—

Source: BAL
Legend: Blue = home team win; Red = away team win.

=== Ranking of third-placed teams ===
Pos	Grp	Team	Pld	W	L	PF	PA	PD	Pts	Qualification
1	B	(Cameroon) FAP	3	1	2	235	218	+17	4	Advance to playoffs
2	C	(Senegal) AS Douanes	3	1	2	230	250	−20	4	Advance to playoffs
3	A	(Nigeria) Rivers Hoopers	3	1	2	210	251	−41	4	

Source: BAL

== Playoffs ==
All eight qualified teams from the group stage were ranked and seeded to determine the match-ups. The play-offs games were played in a single-elimination format. The playoffs began on 26 May and ended on 30 May 2021 with the 2021 BAL Finals.

=== Bracket ===
Quarterfinals
27 May
1 (Tunisia) US Monastir	86
8 (Senegal) AS Douanes	62
27 May
4 (Rwanda) Patriots	73
5 (Mozambique) Ferroviário de Maputo	71
26 May
2 (Egypt) Zamalek	82
7 (Cameroon) FAP	53
26 May
3 (Angola) Petro de Luanda	79
6 (Morocco) AS Salé	72

Semifinals
29 May
1 (Tunisia) US Monastir	87
4 (Rwanda) Patriots	46
29 May
2 (Egypt) Zamalek	89
3 (Angola) Petro de Luanda	71

Finals
30 May
1 (Tunisia) US Monastir	63
2 (Egypt) Zamalek	76
Third place game
30 May
4 (Rwanda) Patriots	68
3 (Angola) Petro de Luanda	97

== Final standings ==
Position	Team	Record
1	(Egypt) Zamalek	6–0
2	(Tunisia) US Monastir	5–1
3	(Angola) Petro de Luanda	5–1
4	(Rwanda) Patriots	3–3
5	(Mozambique) Ferroviário de Maputo	2–2
6	(Morocco) AS Salé	2–2
7	(Cameroon) FAP	1–3
8	(Senegal) AS Douanes	1–3
9	(Nigeria) Rivers Hoopers	1–2
10	(Mali) AS Police	0–3
11	(Algeria) GS Pétroliers	0–3
12	(Madagascar) GNBC	0–3

== Awards ==
- Most Valuable Player: (United States Virgin Islands) Walter Hodge (Zamalek)
- Defensive Player of the Year: (Egypt) Anas Mahmoud (Zamalek)
- Sportsmanship Award: (Tunisia) Makrem Ben Romdhane (US Monastir)
- Ubuntu Award: (Algeria) Hicham Benayad-Cherif (GS Pétroliers)
- Scoring Champion: (United States) Terrell Stoglin (AS Salé)
- All-BAL First Team:
  - (Tunisia) Omar Abada (US Monastir)
  - (United States Virgin Islands) Walter Hodge (Zamalek)
  - (Lebanon) Wael Arakji (US Monastir)
  - (Tunisia) Makrem Ben Romdhane (US Monastir)
  - (Egypt) Anas Mahmoud (Zamalek)

== Statistics ==
The following were the statistical leaders in 2021 BAL season.

=== Individual statistic leaders ===
Category	Player	Team(s)	Statistic
Points per game	(United States) Terrell Stoglin	AS Salé	30.8
Rebounds per game	(Senegal) Ibrahima Thomas	AS Police	12.0
Assists per game	(Democratic Republic of the Congo) Myck Kabongo	Ferroviário de Maputo	6.8
Steals per game	(Senegal) Bara Diop	AS Douanes	2.5
Blocks per game	(Egypt) Anas Mahmoud	Zamalek	3.2
Turnovers per game	(United States) Demarcus Holland	Ferroviário de Maputo	4.3
Minutes per game	(United States) Demarcus Holland	Ferroviário de Maputo	36.2
FG%	(Egypt) Mohab Yasser	Zamalek	69.7%
3P%	(Ivory Coast) Mouloukou Diabate	Zamalek	59.1%
FT%	(Rwanda) Kenny Gasana	Patriots	94.1%

=== Individual game highs ===
Category	Player	Team	Statistic
Points	(United States) Terrell Stoglin	AS Salé	40
Rebounds	(Angola) Jone Pedro	Petro de Luanda	17
Rebounds	(Senegal) Ibrahima Thomas	AS Police	17
Assists	(Democratic Republic of the Congo) Myck Kabongo	Ferroviário de Maptuo	12
Steals	(Tunisia) Mokhtar Ghyaza	US Monastir	5
Blocks	(Egypt) Anas Mahmoud	Zamalek	5
Three pointers	(Tunisia) Radhouane Slimane	US Monastir	6
Three pointers	(Rwanda) Aristide Mugabe	Patriots	6

=== Team statistic leaders ===
Category	Team	Statistic
Points per game	US Monastir	89.9
Rebounds per game	FAP	42.0
Assists per game	US Monastir	24.4
Steals per game	US Monastir	11.0
Blocks per game	Rivers Hoopers	5.3
Turnovers per game	GS Pétroliers	22.0
Fouls per game	GS Pétroliers	25.7
FG%	Zamalek	49.9%
FT%	Ferroviário de Maputo	78.9%
3FG%	US Monastir	36.1%

== Controversies ==
The BAL has faced criticism by The Guardian over its close ties with the Rwandan government in organising the league, using the league as a vehicle for sportswashing by Rwandan President Paul Kagame, pointing to ongoing repression and human rights abuses under his regime.

On May 10, 2021, American rapper J. Cole signed a contract with the Rwanda-based Patriots. In three games with the team, he scored five points, had three assists and five rebounds in 45 minutes of gameplay. Terrell Stoglin of AS Salé states about the signing: "For a guy who has so much money and has another career to just come here and average, like, one point a game and still get glorified is very disrespectful to the game. It's disrespectful to the ones who sacrificed their whole lives for this."
