= 2021 BAL qualification =

2021 BAL qualification (Road to BAL 2021)
- Association: FIBA Africa
- League: Road to BAL
- Sport: Basketball
- Duration: 16 October – 21 December 2019
- Games: 89
- Teams: 31

West Division
- Division champions: (Algeria) GS Pétroliers
- Top scorer: Timothy Kwaor (Nigelec)

East Division
- Division champions: (Rwanda) Patriots
- Top scorer: Baraka Athumani (JKT)

Seasons
- 2022 →

The 2020 BAL Qualifying Tournaments were the inaugural qualifying tournaments of the Basketball Africa League (BAL), the newly launched premier basketball league of Africa jointly organized by the NBA and FIBA. While the NBA will co-organise from the regular season, the qualifiers are completely organised by FIBA Africa.

A total of 31 teams from 31 countries participate in the qualifying tournaments in order to determine which six teams will play in the 2020 BAL regular season, along with six directly placed six teams. The qualifying tournaments are divided into the First round and Second round, which run from 16 October until 21 December 2019.

== Team allocation ==
A total of 31 teams from 31 countries played in the qualifying tournaments. League positions after eventual playoffs of the previous season shown in parentheses. On 9 October 2019, the official list of participating teams in the qualifying rounds was announced by FIBA.

First round
West Division		East Division	
(Algeria) GS Pétroliers (1st)	(Libya) Al-Nasr (1st)	(Rwanda) Patriots (1st)	(Ethiopia) Hawassa City (1st)
(Ivory Coast) ABC (1st)	(Benin) ASPAC (1st)	(Burundi) Dynamo (1st)	(South Sudan) Cobra Sport
(Liberia) NPA Pythons (1st)	(Cameroon) FAP (2nd)	(Zimbabwe) Mercenaries (1st)	(Zambia) UNZA Pacers (1st)
(Democratic Republic of the Congo) Mazembe (1st)	(Equatorial Guinea) Virgen María de África	(Kenya) KPA (1st)	(Madagascar) GNBC (1st)
(Ghana) Braves of Customs (1st)	(Niger) Nigelec (1st)	(Comoros) Usoni (1st)	(Botswana) Dolphins (1st)
(Guinea) SLAC (1st)	(Mali) AS Police (1st)	(Uganda) City Oilers (1st)	(Tanzania) JKT (1st)
(Gabon) Manga (1st)	(Central African Republic) ~~Abeilles~~ (1st)	(Mozambique) Ferroviário de Maputo (1st)	(South Africa) Jozi Nuggets (1st)
		(Namibia) Lions (1st)	(Seychelles) Beau Vallon Heat (1st)
		(Malawi) ~~Brave Hearts~~ (1st)	

Notes

1. Cameroon (CMR): FAP, runners-up of the Cameroon Basketball League, replaced national champions Condor.
2. FIBA: Brave Hearts from Malawi and Abeilles from the Central African Republic were announced by FIBA on the team list released on 9 October 2019. However, eventually the teams did not participate in their respective allocated groups.
3. South Sudan (SSD): Cobra of South Sudan was not listed on the official team list released on 9 October 2019. They were placed in Group F.

== First round ==
Location of tournaments of the 2020 BAL Qualifying Tournaments.
Red: Group A; Yellow: Group B; Green: Group C; Dark Green: Group D; Purple: Group E. Pink: Group F; Blue: Group G.

In the first round, thirtytwo teams participate in six groups divided over two geographical divisions (West and East). Groups were selected by geographical criteria. The winners and runners-up of each group qualify for the second round while four other teams were invited with wild cards, chosen by FIBA.

The first games were played at 15 October and the last on 3 November 2019.

=== West Division ===
==== Group A ====
Venue: Bamako, Mali

Pos	Team	Pld	W	L	PF	PA	PD	Pts	Qualification	POL	GSP	ALN	SLAC
1	(Mali) Police (H)	3	2	1	231	222	+9	5 (Note: Head to head: Police 83, GS Pétroliers 76.)	Advance to second round	—		79–71	69–75
2	(Algeria) GS Pétroliers	3	2	1	278	213	+65	5	Advance to second round	76–83	—	106–80	
3	(Libya) Al Naser (W)	3	1	2	227	257	−30	4 (Note: Head to head: Al Naser 76, SLAC 72.)	Advance to second round			—	76–72
4	(Guinea) SLAC	3	1	2	197	241	−44	4			50–96		—

Source: FIBA
(H) Hosts; (W) Advanced with a wild card
Notes:

25 October 2019	GS Pétroliers (Algeria)	106–80	(Libya) Al Naser	Bamako
18:00	Scoring by quarter: 31-12, 23-21, 21-26, 31-21
	Pts: Benayad-Cherif 22; Rebs: Bourkaib 9 Asts: Bourkaib 7	Boxscore	Pts: Cole 19; Rebs: Cole 9 Asts: Four players 3	Arena: Palais des Sports Salamatou Maïga

25 October 2019	AS Police (Mali)	69–75	(Guinea) SLAC	Bamako
20:30	Scoring by quarter: 20-19, 19-12, 13-30, 17-14
	Pts: Tandina 20; Rebs: Diarouma 14; Asts: Traoré 3	Boxscore	Pts: McFarlan 24; Rebs: Pohohoulou 10; Asts: McFarlan 5	Arena: Palais des Sports Salamatou Maïga

26 October 2019	SLAC (Guinea)	50–96	(Algeria) GS Pétroliers	Bamako
18:00	Scoring by quarter: 7-26, 14-21, 16-26, 13-23
	Pts: Pohohoulou 13; Rebs: Pohohoulou 8 Asts: Fofana 4	Boxscore	Pts: Hamdini 19; Rebs: Koibe 14; Asts: Touati 10	Arena: Palais des Sports Salamatou Maïga

26 October 2019	AS Police (Mali)	79–71	(Libya) Al Naser	Bamako
20:30	Scoring by quarter: 23-18, 19-24, 20-11, 17-18
	Pts: Diarouma 20; Rebs: Diarouma 17; Asts: Tandina 5	Boxscore	Pts: Cole 25; Rebs: Thomas 21; Asts: Al Beigow, Alfaqlyah 4	Arena: Palais des Sports Salamatou Maïga

27 October 2019	Al Naser (Libya)	76–72	(Guinea) SLAC	Bamako
18:00	Scoring by quarter: 9-16, 23-20, 16-20, 28-16
	Pts: Thomas 22; Rebs: Thomas 7 Asts: Mohamed 4	Boxscore	Pts: McFarlan 29; Rebs: McFarlan 16; Asts: McFarlan, Pohohoulou 3	Arena: Palais des Sports Salamatou Maïga

27 October 2019	GS Pétroliers (Algeria)	76–83	(Mali) Police	Bamako
20:30	Scoring by quarter: 12-18, 17-19, 19-16, 28-30
	Pts: Hamdini 16; Rebs: Hamdini 11; Asts: Kante 4	Boxscore	Pts: White 20; Rebs: White 14; Asts: Coulibaly 4	Arena: Palais des Sports Salamatou Maïga

==== Group B ====
Venue: Cotonou, Benin

Pos	Team	Pld	W	L	PF	PA	PD	Pts	Qualification	ABC	NIG	ASP	NPA	BRA
1	(Ivory Coast) ABC	4	3	1	286	241	+45	7 (Note: Head-to-head: ABC 74, Nigelec 68.)	Advance to second round	—	74–68		76–62	
2	(Niger) Nigelec	4	3	1	292	257	+35	7	Advance to second round		—	65–60		64–46
3	(Benin) ASPAC (H)	4	2	2	257	265	−8	6		55–83		—		82–59
4	(Liberia) NPA Pythons	4	1	3	271	301	−30	5 (Note: Head-to-head: NPA Pythons 74, Braves of Customs 70.)			77–95	58–60	—	
5	(Ghana) Braves of Customs	4	1	3	231	273	−42	5		56–53			70–74	—

Source: FIBA
Legend: Blue = home team win; Red = away team win.
(H) Hosts
Notes:

29 October 2019	ASPAC (Benin)	82–59	(Ghana) Braves of Customs	Cotonou
	Scoring by quarter: 15-18, 22-11, 22-15, 23-15
	Pts: Lougbegnon 34; Rebs: Three players 7 Asts: Sassou 5	Boxscore	Pts: Aryee 18; Rebs: Dzogbetsi, Pappoe 5 Asts: Aryee 3	Arena: Palais des Sports de Cotonou

29 October 2019	ABC (Ivory Coast)	74–68	(Niger) Nigelec	Cotonou
	Scoring by quarter: 19-20, 15-14, 24-16, 16-18
	Pts: Konaté 20; Rebs: Konaté 10; Asts: Traoré, Kone 2	Boxscore	Pts: Kwaor 16; Rebs: Ademola 10; Asts: Kwaor, Moussa 2	Arena: Palais des Sports de Cotonou

30 October 2019	Braves of Customs (Ghana)	70–74(OT)	(Liberia) NPA Pythons	Cotonou
	Scoring by quarter: 18-20, 19-9, 12-13, 8-12, Overtime: 8-12
	Pts: Aryee 15; Rebs: Alhassan 9 Asts: Brimah 5	Boxscore	Pts: Davidson 14; Rebs: Davidson 21; Asts: Baker Jr., Petors 3	Arena: Palais des Sports de Cotonou

30 October 2019	Nigelec (Niger)	65–60(OT)	(Benin) ASPAC	Cotonou
	Scoring by quarter: 13-14, 9-16, 12-12, 20-12, Overtime: 11-6
	Pts: Ademola 18; Rebs: Ademola 21; Asts: Ademola 2	Boxscore	Pts: Lougbegnon 17; Rebs: Ejeh 22; Asts: Ahivohozin 5	Arena: Palais des Sports de Cotonou

31 October 2019	Nigelec (Niger)	64–46	(Ghana) Braves of Customs	Cotonou
		Boxscore		Arena: Palais des Sports de Cotonou

31 October 2019	ABC (Ivory Coast)	76–62	(Liberia) NPA Pythons	Cotonou
		Boxscore		Arena: Palais des Sports de Cotonou

1 November 2019	NPA Pythons (Liberia)	77–95	(Niger) Nigelec	Cotonou
		Boxscore		Arena: Palais des Sports de Cotonou

1 November 2019	ASPAC (Benin)	55–83	(Ivory Coast) ABC	Cotonou
		Boxscore		Arena: Palais des Sports de Cotonou

2 November 2019	Braves of Customs (Ghana)	56–53	(Ivory Coast) ABC	Cotonou
		Boxscore		Arena: Palais des Sports de Cotonou

2 November 2019	NPA Pythons (Liberia)	58–60	(Benin) ASPAC	Cotonou
		Boxscore		Arena: Palais des Sports de Cotonou

==== Group C ====
Venue: Libreville, Gabon

Pos	Team	Pld	W	L	PF	PA	PD	Pts	Qualification	FAP	MAN	MAZ	VMA
1	(Cameroon) FAP	3	3	0	236	176	+60	6	Advance to second round	—	64–63		101–46
2	(Gabon) Manga (H)	3	2	1	244	186	+58	5	Advance to second round		—	60–59	121–63
3	(Democratic Republic of the Congo) ASB Mazembe (W)	3	1	2	211	186	+25	4	Advance to second round	67–71		—	
4	(Equatorial Guinea) Virgen María de África	3	0	3	164	307	−143	3				55–85	—

Source: FIBA
Legend: Blue = home team win; Red = away team win.
(H) Hosts; (W) Advanced with wild card

16 October 2019	Manga (Gabon)	121–63	(Equatorial Guinea) Virgen María de África	Libreville
	Scoring by quarter: 26-26, 26-15, 22-7, 48-15
	Pts: Tsangue 34; Rebs: Moupomo 11; Asts: Ndong 5		Pts: Shuj 16; Rebs: Shuj 9 Asts: Shuj 7	Arena: Palais des Sports de Libreville

17 October 2019	Mazembe (Democratic Republic of the Congo)	67–71	(Cameroon) FAP	Libreville
	Scoring by quarter: 15-13, 10-21, 24-16, 18-21
	Pts: Fula Nganga 19; Rebs: Mwamba 10; Asts: Mwamba 5		Pts: Keumoe 12; Rebs: Hezekiah 7 Asts: Kome 3	Arena: Palais des Sports de Libreville

18 October 2019	FAP (Cameroon)	101–46	(Equatorial Guinea) Virgen María de África	Libreville
	Scoring by quarter: 25-4, 22-8, 28-10, 26-24
	Pts: Kome 24; Rebs: Dzou 10; Asts: Rezendes 4		Pts: Maye 13; Rebs: Diouf 8 Asts: Diouf 3	Arena: Palais des Sports de Libreville

18 October 2019	Manga (Gabon)	60–59	(Democratic Republic of the Congo) Mazembe	Libreville
	Scoring by quarter: 28-15, 15-12, 9-17, 18-15
	Pts: Bidias 15; Rebs: Nolba 10; Asts: Nguyabama, Moupomo 2		Pts: Fula Nganga 20; Rebs: Kabange 11; Asts: Mwamba 5	Arena: Palais des Sports de Libreville

19 October 2019	Virgen María de África (Equatorial Guinea)	55–85	(Democratic Republic of the Congo) Mazembe	Libreville
	Scoring by quarter: 16-15, 15-27, 8-26, 16-17
	Pts: Nzang 19; Rebs: Roku 5 Asts: Diouf 5		Pts: Kabange 30; Rebs: Kabange, Isungu 9 Asts: Kabange, Banzai 4	Arena: Palais des Sports de Libreville

19 October 2019	FAP (Cameroon)	64–63	(Gabon) Manga	Libreville
	Scoring by quarter: 25-11, 12-22, 15-14, 12-16
	Pts: Rezendes 12; Rebs: Dzou 6 Asts: Kalume 6		Pts: Bidias 15; Rebs: Mopoumo 12; Asts: Ndong 4	Arena: Palais des Sports de Libreville

=== Division West ===
==== Group D ====
Venue: Dar es Salaam, Tanzania

Pos	Team	Pld	W	L	PF	PA	PD	Pts	Qualification	PAT	CIT	JKT	DYN	HAW
1	(Rwanda) Patriots	4	4	0	351	242	+109	8	Advance to second round	—	74–63	79–65		125–50
2	(Uganda) City Oilers	4	3	1	319	236	+83	7	Advance to second round		—	85–54	71–57	
3	(Tanzania) JKT (H, W)	4	2	2	296	279	+17	6	Advance to second round			—		87–47
4	(Burundi) Dynamo	4	1	3	279	275	+4	5		64–73		68–88	—	
5	(Ethiopia) Hawassa City	4	0	4	189	402	−213	4			49–100		43–90	—

Source: FIBA
Legend: Blue = home team win; Red = away team win.
(H) Hosts; (W) Advanced with wild card

16 October 2019
City Oilers (Uganda)	71–57	(Burundi) Dynamo
JKT (Tanzania)	87–47	(Ethiopia) Hawassa City
17 October 2019
Dynamo (Burundi)	64–73	(Rwanda) Patriots
Hawassa City (Ethiopia)	49–100	(Uganda) City Oilers
18 October 2019
City Oilers (Uganda)	85–54	(Tanzania) JKT
Patriots (Rwanda)	125–50	(Ethiopia) Hawassa City
19 October 2019
Hawassa City (Ethiopia)	43–90	(Burundi) Dynamo
Patriots (Rwanda)	79–65	(Tanzania) JKT
20 October 2019
Patriots (Rwanda)	74–63	(Uganda) City Oilers
Dynamo (Burundi)	68–88	(Tanzania) JKT

==== Group E ====
Venue: Johannesburg, South Africa

Pos	Team	Pld	W	L	PF	PA	PD	Pts	Qualification	FER	UZP	MER	LIO	JZN	DOL
1	(Mozambique) Ferroviário de Maputo	5	5	0	467	335	+132	10	Advance to second round	—	84–69				94–64
2	(Zambia) UNZA Pacers	5	4	1	365	348	+17	9	Advance to second round		—	80–74		72–54	72–54
3	(Zimbabwe) Mercenaries	5	3	2	356	366	−10	8		72–100		—	64–55		
4	(Namibia) Lions Club	5	1	4	343	396	−53	6 (Note: Head-to-head point difference: Lions Club +2, Jozi Nuggets 1, Dolphins –3.)		60–102	66–70		—		
5	(South Africa) Jozi Nuggets (H)	5	1	4	338	361	−23	6		70–87		63–66	67–74	—	
6	(Botswana) Dolphins	5	1	4	339	402	−63	6				68–80	93–88	60–68	—

Source: FIBA
Legend: Blue = home team win; Red = away team win.
(H) Hosts
Notes:

22 October 2019	Mercenaries (Zimbabwe)	64–55	(Namibia) Lions	Johannesburg
13:00	Scoring by quarter: 13-17, 27-10, 7-21, 17-7
	Pts: Maturure 17; Rebs: Maturure 12; Asts: Chitsinde 5	Boxscore	Pts: Nghixulifwa 13; Rebs: Nghixulifwa 11; Asts: Mukumbutaa 4	Arena: Wembley Arena

22 October 2019	Ferroviário de Maputo (Mozambique)	94–64	(Botswana) Dolphins	Johannesburg
15:30	Scoring by quarter: 19-14, 27-21, 25-15, 23-14
	Pts: Martins 19; Rebs: Calvo Masa 14; Asts: Matos 4	Boxscore	Pts: Warikandwa 21; Rebs: Ramabu 12; Asts: Barrows, Ndawanyana 3	Arena: Wembley Arena

22 October 2019	UNZA Pacers (Zambia)	74–70(OT)	(South Africa) Jozi Nuggets	Johannesburg
18:00	Scoring by quarter: 21-16, 17-21, 17-13, 10-15, Overtime: 9-5
	Pts: Lubinda 18; Rebs: Kashishi 12; Asts: Mauwe 5	Boxscore	Pts: Mothiba 20; Rebs: Mabotja 12; Asts: Mothiba 4	Arena: Wembley Arena

23 October 2019	Lions (Namibia)	60–102	(Mozambique) Ferroviário de Maputo	Johannesburg
13:00	Scoring by quarter: 12-9, 9-28, 15-23, 24-32
	Pts: Kazeurua, Mukumbutaa 13; Rebs: Mukumbutaa 12; Asts: Three players 3	Boxscore	Pts: De Barros 18; Rebs: Calvo Masa 10; Asts: Novela 5	Arena: Wembley Arena

23 October 2019	UNZA Pacers (Zambia)	80–74(OT)	(Zimbabwe) Mercenaries	Johannesburg
15:30	Scoring by quarter: 15-21, 16-21, 16-12, 23-16, Overtime: 10-4
	Pts: Banda, Chelebela 13; Rebs: Kashishi 12; Asts: Lubinda 7	Boxscore	Pts: Maturure 30; Rebs: Chivanganye 13; Asts: Pfachi 5	Arena: Wembley Arena

23 October 2019	Dolphins (Botswana)	60–68	(South Africa) Jozi Nuggets	Johannesburg
18:00	Scoring by quarter: 17-8, 15-25, 19-20, 12-15
	Pts: Ramadu 19; Rebs: Ramabu 9 Asts: Ramoshebi, Warikandwa 3	Boxscore	Pts: Mothiba 18; Rebs: Mothiba 13; Asts: Mothiba, Selepe 3	Arena: Wembley Arena

24 October 2019	Mercenaries (Zimbabwe)	72–100	(Mozambique) Ferroviário de Maputo	Johannesburg
13:00	Scoring by quarter: 21-20, 21-28, 14-28, 16-24
	Pts: Maturure 27; Rebs: Sithole 7 Asts: Maturure 3	Boxscore	Pts: Calvo Masa 28; Rebs: Calvo Masa 12; Asts: Canivete Jr. 5	Arena: Wembley Arena

24 October 2019	UNZA Pacers (Zambia)	72–54	(Botswana) Dolphins	Johannesburg
15:30	Scoring by quarter: 10-16, 19-16, 22-17, 21-5
	Pts: Banda, Mapani 15; Rebs: Banda, Ngonga 13; Asts: Hara 3	Boxscore	Pts: Barrows 19; Rebs: Ramabu 16; Asts: Ramabu 5	Arena: Wembley Arena

24 October 2019	Jozi Nuggets (South Africa)	67–74	(Namibia) Lions	Johannesburg
18:00	Scoring by quarter: 13-19, 25-14, 15-21, 14-20
	Pts: Sithole; Rebs: Mothiba 15; Asts: Nyawo, Sithole 3	Boxscore	Pts: Nghixulifwa 20; Rebs: Mukumbutaa 15; Asts: Three players 3	Arena: Wembley Arena

26 October 2019	Dolphins (Botswana)	93–88(OT)	(Namibia) Lions	Johannesburg
13:00	Scoring by quarter: 20-24, 22-26, 19-18, 23-16, Overtime: 9-4
	Pts: Barrows 25; Rebs: Ramabu 13; Asts: Warikandwa 6	Boxscore	Pts: Banda 28; Rebs: Mukumbutaa 15; Asts: Mukumbutaa 5	Arena: Wembley Arena

26 October 2019
15:30

Box score

Ferroviário de Maputo (Mozambique)	84–69	(Zambia) UNZA Pacers
Scoring by quarter: 20–17, 21–18, 25–12, 18–22
Pts: Calvo Masa 22; Rebs: Calvo Masa 13; Asts: Novela 5		Pts: Banda 15; Rebs: Banda 8 Asts: Lubinda 4

Wembley Stadium, Johannesburg, South Africa

26 October 2019
18:00 (GMT+2)

Box score

Jozi Nuggets (South Africa)	66–63	(Zimbabwe) Mercenaries
Scoring by quarter: 21–8, 18–26, 12–18, 15–11
Pts: Mothiba 20; Rebs: Mthembu 9 Asts: Nyawo 3		Pts: Chitsinde 17; Rebs: Chivanganye 20; Asts: Five players 2

Wembley Stadium, Johannesburg, South Africa

27 October 2019	Lions Club (Namibia)	66–70	(Zambia) UNZA Pacers	Johannesburg
13:00	Scoring by quarter: 15-20, 10-14, 23-8, 18-28
	Pts: Mukumbutaa 26; Rebs: Mukumbutaa 26; Asts: Mukumbutaa 3	Boxscore	Pts: Hara 16; Rebs: Mauwe, Ngonga 7 Asts: Kashishi 3	Arena: Wembley Arena

27 October 2019	Dolphins (Botswana)	68–80	(Zimbabwe) Mercenaries	Johannesburg
15:30	Scoring by quarter: 19-15, 15-29, 17-19, 17-17
	Pts: Barrows 26; Rebs: Ramabu 16; Asts: Ramabu 6	Boxscore	Pts: Maturure 16; Rebs: Chivanganye 10; Asts: Tswatswa 6	Arena: Wembley Arena

27 October 2019	Jozi Nuggets (South Africa)	70–87	(Mozambique) Ferroviário de Maputo	Johannesburg
18:00	Scoring by quarter: 21-21, 25-24, 14-23, 10-19
	Pts: Selepe 23; Rebs: Mafeto 11; Asts: Selepe 7	Boxscore	Pts: Canivete Jr., Chimonzo 19; Rebs: Muchate 11; Asts: Novela 4	Arena: Wembley Arena

==== Group F ====
Venue: Antananarivo, Madagascar

Pos	Team	Pld	W	L	PF	PA	PD	Pts	Qualification	KPA	GNBC	COB	BVH	USO
1	(Kenya) KPA	4	4	0	431	290	+141	8	Advance to second round	—	98–84	81–78		
2	(Madagascar) GNBC (H)	4	3	1	386	281	+105	7	Advance to second round		—		92–67	124–53
3	(South Sudan) Cobra (W)	4	2	2	359	259	+100	6	Advance to second round		63–86	—		124–48
4	(Seychelles) Beau Vallon Heat	4	1	3	185	317	−132	5		54–131		44–94	—	
5	(Comoros) Usoni	4	0	4	175	389	−214	4		74–121			0–20	—

Source: FIBA
Legend: Blue = home team win; Red = away team win.
(H) Hosts; (W) Advanced with wild card

30 October 2019	Beau Vallon Heat (Seychelles)	44–94	(South Sudan) Cobra Sport	Antananarivo
20:00	Scoring by quarter: 8–25, 7–16, 13–17, 16–36
	Pts: Adam 9 Rebs: Hoareau 10; Asts: Adam, Bouchereau 3	Boxscore	Pts: Anthony 29; Rebs: Leek 13; Asts: Morris 7	Arena: Palais des Sports et la Culture

30 October 2019	GNBC (Madagascar)	124–53	(Comoros) Usoni	Antananarivo
22:30	Scoring by quarter: 27-6, 21-26, 38-11, 38-10
	Pts: Razafimanantsoa 17; Rebs: De Claisse 13; Asts: Mandimbison 6	Boxscore	Pts: Said 16; Rebs: Said 6 Asts: Abdallah 4	Arena: Palais des Sports et la Culture

31 October 2019	Usoni (Comoros)	0–20 (Note: Usoni withdrew its game against Beau Vallon Heat on 31 October 2019, automatically losing 0–20.)	(Seychelles) Beau Vallon Heat	Antananarivo
20:00
				Arena: Palais des Sports et la Culture

31 October 2019	KPA (Kenya)	98–84	(Madagascar) GNBC	Antananarivo
22:30	Scoring by quarter: 26-23, 25-20, 23-19, 24-22
	Pts: Ayodi 20; Rebs: Nyakinda 12; Asts: Odendo, Kazunguzibwa 5	Boxscore	Pts: Mory 36; Rebs: Rakotonirina, Randriamampionona 8 Asts: Mandimbison 5	Arena: Palais des Sports et la Culture

1 November 2019	Cobra Sport (South Sudan)	124–48	(Comoros) Usoni	Antananarivo
20:30	Scoring by quarter: 27-9, 35-5, 19-10, 43-24
	Pts: Makuei 24; Rebs: Rumubu 10; Asts: Tony Anthony 7	Boxscore	Pts: El-Had 19; Rebs: Maamoune 7 Asts: Abdallah, El-Had 2	Arena: Palais des Sports et la Culture

1 November 2019	Beau Vallon Heat (Seychelles)	54–131	(Kenya) KPA	Antananarivo
22:30	Scoring by quarter: 12-33, 6-28, 12-34, 24-36
	Pts: Adam 24; Rebs: Hoareau 8 Asts: Aglae 3	Boxscore	Pts: Wachira 27; Rebs: Koranga 11; Asts: Oyugi 9	Arena: Palais des Sports et la Culture

2 November 2019	KPA (Kenya)	81–78	(South Sudan) Cobra Sport	Antananarivo
20:00	Scoring by quarter: 24-15, 16-20, 17-21, 24-22
	Pts: Kazunguzibwa 20; Rebs: Koranga 14; Asts: Koranga 5	Boxscore	Pts: Three players 20; Rebs: Anthony 10; Asts: Lado 5	Arena: Palais des Sports et la Culture

2 November 2019	GNBC (Madagascar)	92–67	(Seychelles) Beau Vallon Heat	Antananarivo
22:30	Scoring by quarter: 22-19, 21-9, 30-14, 19-25
	Pts: Mandimbison 30; Rebs: De Claisse 10; Asts: Razafimanantsoa 6	Boxscore	Pts: Bouchereau 14; Rebs: N'Ganga 9 Asts: Bouchereau 3	Arena: Palais des Sports et la Culture

3 November 2019	Usoni (Comoros)	74–121	(Kenya) KPA	Antananarivo
20:00	Scoring by quarter: 17-34, 13-25, 15-28, 29-34
	Pts: El-Had 33; Rebs: Dachir 7 Asts: Dachir, Yousmine 4	Boxscore	Pts: Ayodi 24; Rebs: Ayodi 11; Asts: Oyugi 5	Arena: Palais des Sports et la Culture

3 November 2019	Cobra (South Sudan)	63–86	(Madagascar) GNBC	Antananarivo
22:30	Scoring by quarter: 16-20, 15-25, 9-22, 23-19
	Pts: Lado, Rumudu 11; Rebs: Magol 11; Asts: Morris 3	Boxscore	Pts: Randriamampionona 22; Rebs: Rakotonirina 9 Asts: Randriamampionona 4	Arena: Palais des Sports et la Culture

== Second round ==
In the Second Round (also referred to as "Elite 16" by FIBA), the sixteen teams that advanced from the first round teams play in four groups of four, divided over two geographical divisions. The top two teams of each group advance to the semi-finals. Winners of each semi-finals qualify for the regular season while the losers play in a third place game for the final regular season spot. On 7 November, FIBA announced the four wild card receivers.

The Division West tournament will be played at the Kigali Arena in the Rwandan city of Kigali. The Division East tournament is played in the Multipurpose Sports Complex in Yaoundé, Cameroon. The Elite 16 will start on 26 November and end 22 December 2019.

=== Qualified teams ===
The draw was held on 21 November in Abidjan.

Division	Group	Winners	Runners-up	Wild cards
West	A	(Mali) Police	(Algeria) GS Pétroliers	(Libya) Al Naser
West	B	(Ivory Coast) ABC	(Niger) Nigelec	
West	C	(Cameroon) FAP	(Gabon) Manga	(Democratic Republic of the Congo) ASB Mazembe
East	D	(Rwanda) Patriots	(Uganda) City Oilers	(Tanzania) JKT
East	E	(Mozambique) Ferroviário de Maputo	(Zambia) UNZA Pacers	
East	F	(Kenya) KPA	(Madagascar) GNBC	(South Sudan) Cobra

=== West Division – Group G ===
==== Group A ====
Pos	Team	Pld	W	L	PF	PA	PD	Pts	Qualification
1	(Algeria) GS Pétroliers	3	2	1	286	257	+29	5 (Note: Head-to-head point difference: GS Pétroliers +3, FAP –1, Al Naser –2.)	Advance to Semi-finals
2	(Cameroon) FAP	3	2	1	256	255	+1	5	Advance to Semi-finals
3	(Libya) Al Naser	3	2	1	261	245	+16	5	
4	(Niger) Nigelec	3	0	3	231	277	−46	3	

Source: FIBA
Notes:

26 November 2019	Nigelec (Niger)	89–115	(Algeria) GS Pétroliers	Yaoundé
	Pts: Kwaor 29; Rebs: Amadou 7 Asts: Amadou 3 PIR: Kwaor 15	Boxscore	Pts: Touati 26; Rebs: Three players 8 Asts: Bourkaib 4	Arena: Yaoundé Multipurpose Sports Complex

26 November 2019	FAP (Cameroon)	95–99	(Libya) Al Naser	Yaoundé
	Pts: Rezendes & Kalume 21; Rebs: Bileg II 9 Asts: Rezendes 7 PIR: Rezendes 24	Boxscore	Pts: Ali Haidar 39; Rebs: Ali Haiadar 11; Asts: Sadi 5	Arena: Yaoundé Multipurpose Sports Complex

27 November 2019	Al Naser (Libya)	85–67	(Niger) Nigelec	Yaoundé
		Boxscore		Arena: Yaoundé Multipurpose Sports Complex

27 November 2019	GS Pétroliers (Algeria)	85–87	(Cameroon) FAP	Yaoundé
		Boxscore		Arena: Yaoundé Multipurpose Sports Complex

28 November 2019	GS Pétroliers (Algeria)	86–81	(Libya) Al Naser	Yaoundé
		Boxscore		Arena: Yaoundé Multipurpose Sports Complex

28 November 2019	FAP (Cameroon)	77–75	(Niger) Nigelec	Yaoundé
		Boxscore		Arena: Yaoundé Multipurpose Sports Complex

==== Group B ====
Pos	Team	Pld	W	L	PF	PA	PD	Pts	Qualification
1	(Ivory Coast) ABC	3	2	1	249	231	+18	5 (Note: Head-to-head point difference: ABC +12, AS Police –2, Manga –10.)	Advance to Semi-finals
2	(Mali) Police	3	2	1	229	220	+9	5	Advance to Semi-finals
3	(Gabon) Manga	3	2	1	232	214	+18	5	
4	(Democratic Republic of the Congo) ASB Mazembe	3	0	3	232	277	−45	3	

Source: FIBA
Notes:

26 November 2019	ABC (Ivory Coast)	77–78	(Mali) Police	Yaoundé
		Boxscore		Arena: Yaoundé Multipurpose Sports Complex

26 November 2019	ASB Mazembe (Democratic Republic of the Congo)	70–98	(Gabon) Manga	Yaoundé
		Boxscore		Arena: Yaoundé Multipurpose Sports Complex

27 November 2019	Manga (Gabon)	67–80	(Ivory Coast) ABC	Yaoundé
		Boxscore		Arena: Yaoundé Multipurpose Sports Complex

27 November 2019	Police (Mali)	87–76	(Democratic Republic of the Congo) ASB Mazembe	Yaoundé
		Boxscore		Arena: Yaoundé Multipurpose Sports Complex

28 November 2019	Manga (Gabon)	67–64	(Mali) Police	Yaoundé
		Boxscore		Arena: Yaoundé Multipurpose Sports Complex

28 November 2019	ABC (Ivory Coast)	92–86	(Democratic Republic of the Congo) ASB Mazembe	Yaoundé
		Boxscore		Arena: Yaoundé Multipurpose Sports Complex

==== Final round ====
Qualification finals

Semi-finals
30 November
(Algeria) GS Pétroliers	76
(Mali) Police	61
30 November
(Cameroon) FAP	77
(Ivory Coast) ABC	64

Final
1 December
(Algeria) GS Pétroliers	92
(Cameroon) FAP	88
Third place game
1 December
(Mali) Police	71
(Ivory Coast) ABC	69

===== Semi-finals =====
30 November 2019	GS Pétroliers (Algeria)	76–61	(Mali) Police	Yaoundé
15:30	Scoring by quarter: 23–17, 22–14, 14–14, 17–16
	Pts: Belkacemi 21; Rebs: Touati 17; Asts: Green 4 PIR: Touati 25	Boxscore	Pts: Haidara & Steed 14; Rebs: Keita 8 Asts: Traore 4 PIR: Haidara 14	Arena: Yaoundé Multipurpose Sports Complex

30 November 2019	FAP (Cameroon)	77–64	(Ivory Coast) ABC	Yaoundé
19:00	Scoring by quarter: 23–16, 10–16, 24–15, 20–17
	Pts: Beleck & Rezendes 15; Rebs: Bileg II 15; Asts: Rezendes 4 PIR: Bileg II 21		Pts: S. Konaté 20; Rebs: S. Konaté & L. Konaté 11; Asts: Sie 5 PIR: S. Konaté 19	Arena: Yaoundé Multipurpose Sports Complex

===== Third place game =====
1 December 2019	Police (Mali)	71–69	(Ivory Coast) ABC	Yaoundé
13:30	Scoring by quarter: 19–20, 23–11, 15–17, 14–21
	Pts: White 20; Rebs: Diarouma 13; Asts: Steed 8 PIR: White 20	Boxscore	Pts: Sie 25; Rebs: L. Konaté 11; Asts: Sie 8 PIR: Sie & L. Konaté 21	Arena: Yaoundé Multipurpose Sports Complex

===== Final =====
1 December 2019	GS Pétroliers (Algeria)	92–88	(Cameroon) FAP	Yaoundé
19:00	Scoring by quarter: 26–21, 26–12, 17–22, 23–33
	Pts: Benayad-Cherif & Touati 20; Rebs: Touati 14; Asts: Bourkaib & Green 5 PIR: Touati 31	Boxscore	Pts: Rezendes 15; Rebs: Beleck 8 Asts: Rezendes 5 PIR: Kome 16	Arena: Yaoundé Multipurpose Sports Complex

=== East Division – Group H ===
==== Group A ====
Pos	Team	Pld	W	L	PF	PA	PD	Pts	Qualification
1	(Rwanda) Patriots	3	3	0	283	205	+78	6	Advance to Semi-finals
2	(Madagascar) GNBC	3	2	1	253	232	+21	5	Advance to Semi-finals
3	(Zambia) UNZA Pacers	3	1	2	197	209	−12	4	
4	(Tanzania) JKT	3	0	3	179	269	−90	3	

First match(es) will be played: 17 December 2019. Source: FIBA

==== Group B ====
Pos	Team	Pld	W	L	PF	PA	PD	Pts	Qualification
1	(Mozambique) Ferroviário de Maputo	3	2	1	233	225	+8	5	Advance to Semi-finals
2	(Uganda) City Oilers	3	2	1	215	163	+52	5	Advance to Semi-finals
3	(Kenya) KPA	3	2	1	162	140	+22	5	
4	(South Sudan) Cobra	3	0	3	183	265	−82	3	

First match(es) will be played: 17 December 2019. Source: FIBA

==== Final round ====
;Qualification finals

Semi-final round
21 December
(Rwanda) Patriots	81
(Uganda) City Oilers	59
21 December
(Mozambique) Ferroviário de Maputo	90
(Madagascar) GNBC	94

Final round
22 December
(Rwanda) Patriots	94
(Madagascar) GNBC	63
Third place
22 December
(Uganda) City Oilers	57
(Mozambique) Ferroviário de Maputo	74

===== Semi-finals =====
21 December 2019	Patriots (Rwanda)	81–59	(Uganda) City Oilers	Kigali
18:00	Scoring by quarter: 25-19, 17-14, 19-13, 20-13
	Pts: Nijimbere 14; Rebs: Kaje 12; Asts: Gasana 5 PIR: Kaje 17	Boxscore	Pts: Mayes 9 Rebs: Lumanyika 9 Asts: Opong & Lumanyika 4 PIR: Elliott 10	Arena: Kigali Arena

21 December 2019	Ferroviário de Maputo (Mozambique)	90–94	(Madagascar) GNBC	Kigali
20:30	Scoring by quarter: 28–17, 29–14, 19–29, 14–24
	Pts: Calvo Masa 33; Rebs: Muchate 10; Asts: Muchate & Novela 5 PIR: Calvo Masa 28	Boxscore	Pts: Randriamampionona & Mandimbison 22; Rebs: Mandimbison 10; Asts: Ralison 6 PIR: Mandimbison 33	Arena: Kigali Arena

===== Third place game =====
22 December 2019	City Oilers (Uganda)	57–74	(Mozambique) Ferroviário de Maputo	Kigali
	Scoring by quarter: 16–16, 17–13, 15–23, 9–22
	Pts: Opong 18; Rebs: Komakech 10; Asts: Komakech, Petty 4	Boxscore	Pts: Calvo Masa 20; Rebs: Three players 8 Asts: Novela 4	Arena: Kigali Arena

===== Final =====
22 December 2019	Patriots (Rwanda)	94–63	(Madagascar) GNBC	Kigali
	Scoring by quarter: 16–15, 28–14, 21–18, 29–16
	Pts: Mukama 18; Rebs: Ndizeye 11; Asts: Gasana 6	Boxscore	Pts: Randriamampionona 14; Rebs: Mandimbison 6 Asts: Mandimbison 5	Arena: Kigali Arena

== Statistical leaders ==
As retrieved from FIBA.

=== Individual statistics leaders ===
Category	Player	Team	Statistic
Efficiency per game	(Spain) Álvaro Calvo Masa	Ferroviário de Maputo	23.6
Points per game	(Tanzania) Baraka Athumani	JKT	25.3
Rebounds per game	(Namibia) Michael Mukumbutaa	Lions Club	14.8
Assists per game	(Rwanda) Kenny Gasana	Patriots	5.1
Steals per game	(Mali) Ibrahima Haidara	AS Police	3.4
Blocks per game	(Mali) Ibrahima Haidara	AS Police	2.6
Turnovers per game	(Botswana) Ofentse Barrows	Dolphins	5.4
Minutes per game	(Namibia) Joe Sinala Banda	Lions Club	38.8
FG%	(Kenya) Okall Oranga	KPA	58.3%
3P%	(Kenya) Kennedy Wachira	KPA	50.0%

=== Individual game highs ===
Category	Player	Team	Statistic
Points	(Tanzania) Braka Athumani	JKT	45
Rebounds	(Namibia) Michael Mukumbutaa	Lions	26
Assists	(Tanzania) Stephano Mshana	JKT	12
Steals	(Niger) Abdoulaye Harouna	Nigelec	9
Blocks	(Democratic Republic of the Congo) Pitchou Kambuy Manga	ASB Mazembe	5
Three pointers	(Nigeria) Timothy Kwaor	Nigelec	9
