= Abraham Sie =

Ivorian basketball player (1999–2022)

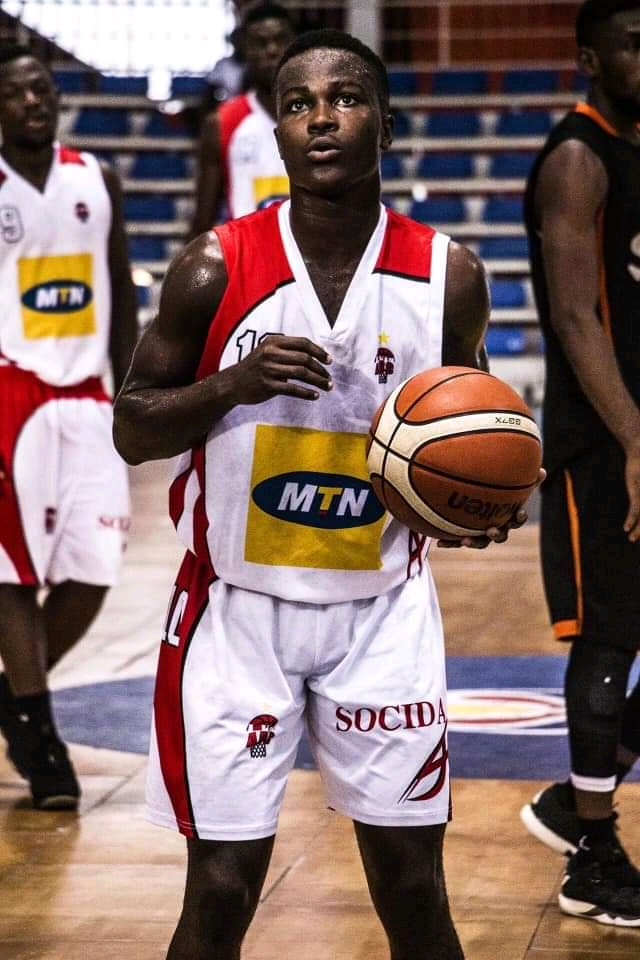
- Sie playing with ABC in 2019

Personal information
- Born: 31 August 1999
- Died: 6 April 2022 (aged 22) Abidjan, Ivory Coast
- Listed height: 1.80 m (5 ft 11 in)
- Listed weight: 88 kg (194 lb)

Career information
- Playing career: 2019–2022
- Position: Point guard
- Number: 14

Career history
- 2019–2021: ABC / ABC Fighters
- 2021–2022: DUC

Louis Cyrille Jean Benoît She (31 August 1999 – 6 April 2022), better known as Abraham Sie, was an Ivorian basketball player. During his career he played for the Ivory Coast national basketball team.

== Club career ==
Sie was a former football player and taekwondo fighter, he was the Ivorian taekwondo champion twice before he started playing basketball. He played for the Ivorian side Abidjan Basket Club, he participated in the Basketball Africa League qualifiers where he averaged 14.33 points, 3.4 rebounds and 4.7 assists.

In October 2021, Sie signed with DUC Dakar, the champions of Senegal.

== Ivorian national team ==
Sie represented the Ivory Coast national basketball team. He was included in the Ivorian team roster for the 2019 FIBA Basketball World Cup, but he did not play a match based on the decision of the coach.

== Death ==
Sie died on 6 April 2022 in Abidjan at age 22, as was announced by his club DUC Dakar.

== Honours ==
ABC Fighters

- Ivorian Basketball Championship winner: 2019, 2020; runner-up: 2021

== See also ==
- List of basketball players who died during their careers
