= Badra Samaké =

Malian basketball player (born 1998)

No. 4 – AS Police
- Position: Point guard
- League: Basketball Africa League

Personal information
- Born: 12 December 1998 (age 27) Mali
- Listed height: 1.82 m (6 ft 0 in)

Career history
- 2017–present: AS Police

Badra "Beneko" Samaké (born 12 December 1998) is a Malian basketball player who plays for AS Police. Standing at 1.82 m (5 ft 11 1/2 in), he plays as point guard.

== Professional career ==
Samaké plays for AS Police and as the captain of the team, he helped the team qualify for the inaugural BAL season.

== National team career ==
He played with Mali U19 at the 2017 U19 World Cup. He also played with the Mali senior team at FIBA AfroCan 2019.

== BAL career statistics ==
Legend
| GP | Games played | GS | Games started | MPG | Minutes per game |
| FG% | Field goal percentage | 3P% | 3-point field goal percentage | FT% | Free throw percentage |
| RPG | Rebounds per game | APG | Assists per game | SPG | Steals per game |
| BPG | Blocks per game | PPG | Points per game | **Bold** | Career high |

| Year | Team | GP | GS | MPG | FG% | 3P% | FT% | RPG | APG | SPG | BPG | PPG |
|---|---|---|---|---|---|---|---|---|---|---|---|---|
| 2021 | AS Police | 2 | 1 | 13.2 | .125 | .000 | .500 | 1.5 | 1.5 | .5 | .0 | 2.0 |
| Career | | 2 | 1 | 13.2 | .125 | .000 | .500 | 1.5 | 1.5 | .5 | .0 | 2.0 |
