= Tanzania Basketball Federation =

- Founded: 1964; 62 years ago
- Affiliation: FIBA
- Regional affiliation: FIBA Africa
- Headquarters: Dar-es-Salaam

Official website
- tanzaniabasketball.or.tz

The Tanzania Basketball Federation (Swahili: Shirikisho la Mpira wa Kikapu Tanzania) is the governing body of basketball in Tanzania. It operates the Tanzania national basketball team as well as the NBL and other amateur leagues.
