= Frank Mba =

Equatoguinean basketball player

Vírgen María de África
- Position: Point guard

Personal information
- Born: 14 February 1989 (age 37) Nsamadulu-Nsomo, Equatorial Guinea
- Listed height: 1.94 m (6 ft 4 in)

Career history
- 2007–2008: CDE Basket Torrejón
- 2009: CB Tíjola
- 2013–2014: Malabo Kings
- 201?: The Panthers
- 201?–present: Vírgen María de África

Francisco Mba Nzang (born 14 February 1989), known as Frank Mba, is an Equatorial Guinean basketball player who plays as a point guard for Vírgen María de África and the Equatorial Guinea national team. He also holds Spanish citizenship.

== Club career ==
Mba has been at the youth ranks of Real Madrid Baloncesto and Baloncesto Fuenlabrada. In 2013, he joined Malabo Kings in Equatorial Guinea.

== International career ==
Mba has joined the Equatorial Guinea men's national basketball team in January 2020. He is a former youth international player for Spain.
