= Al-Nasr SC (Benghazi, basketball) =

Al-Nasr
- Leagues: Libyan Division I Basketball League
- Founded: 1956; 70 years ago
- Location: Benghazi, Libya
Home	Away

Al-Nasr Sports, Cultural and Social Club (Arabic: نادي النصر الرياضي، ثقافي إجتماعي), also spelled as Al Naser, is a Libyan basketball club based in Benghazi. Founded in 1956, the team has won the Libyan championship three times. Its most recent title was in 2018.

Al-Nasr, which was previously funded by the family of Muammar Gaddafi, was featured in the 2013 memoir Qaddafi's Point Guard by Alex Owumi, who played for the team leading up to the Libyan Civil War in 2011.

== Honours ==
Libyan Division I Basketball League: 3

2009, 2017, 2018

Libyan Cup: 3

2009, 2014, 2017

== In international competitions ==
Year	Competition	Result	Record
2008	Arab Club Basketball Championship	Second Stage	3–3
2010	Arab Club Basketball Championship	Preliminary Round	1–2
2021	BAL Qualifying Tournaments	Second round	3–3

== Players ==
=== Notable players ===
Note: Flags indicate national team eligibility at FIBA-sanctioned events. Players may hold other non-FIBA nationalities not displayed.

Criteria

To appear in this section a player must have either:

- Set a club record or won an individual award while at the club
- Played at least one official international match for their national team at any time
- Played at least one official NBA match at any time.

- (Nigeria) Alex Owumi
- (Nigeria) Stanley Gumut
- (Senegal) Ibrahima Thomas
- (United States) Mike Taylor
- (United States) Donald Cole
- (United States) Terrell Stoglin
- (Ukraine) Kyrylo Fesenko

== Head coaches ==
Coach	From	To	Honours
(Egypt) Tareq Salim	2017	2018	
