= Mohamed Touati =

Tunisian cyclist

Personal information
- Born: 17 January 1931 (age 95) Tunis, Tunisia
- Height: 168 cm (5 ft 6 in)
- Weight: 65 kg (143 lb)

Cycling career
- Sport: Cycling

Mohamed Touati (Arabic: محمد تواتي, born 17 January 1939) is a former Tunisian cyclist. He was born in Tunis and his profession was a repairman. He competed in the individual road race and team time trial events at the 1960 Summer Olympics.
