= Braves of Customs =

Ghanaian basketball club

- Leagues: Accra Basketball League
- Founded: 2018; 7 years ago
- Location: Accra, Ghana
- Ownership: CEPS
Home	Away

Braves of Customs, also known as simply Customs, is a Ghanaian basketball club based in Accra. The team plays in the Accra Basketball League (ABL). It is the basketball team of the Customs Excise and Preventive Service (CEPS), Ghana's customs organization.

Established in 2018, the team won the ABL championship in 2018 and 2019. In October 2019, Braves played in the qualifying tournaments for the Basketball Africa League.

== Honours ==
Accra Basketball League

- Winners (3): 2018, 2019, 2022

== In African competitions ==
Road to BAL (1 appearance)

2020 – First Round
