= JKT BC =

JKT
- Leagues: National Basketball League
- Location: Dar es Salaam, Tanzania
- Head coach: Alfred Makoye Ng'Halaliji
| Home | Away |

Jeshi la Kujenga Taifa Basketball Club, commonly known as JKT, is a Tanzanian basketball club from Dar es Salaam. The team plays in the National Basketball League(NBL), and have won the national championship in 2003, 2017 and 2023.

The team made two appearances in the Road to BAL, the qualifiers of the Basketball Africa League (BAL), in the 2021 and 2025 tournaments.

== Honours ==
Tanzanian National League

- Winners: 2003, 2017, 2023
  - Runners-up (2): 2001, 2010

== In African competitions ==
Road to BAL (2 appearances)

2021 – First Round (hosts)
2025 – First Round (hosts)

== Players ==
=== Current roster ===
The following was JKT's roster in November 2019.

Note: Flags indicate national team eligibility at FIBA-sanctioned events. Players may hold other non-FIBA nationalities not displayed.

JKT roster
Players
Coaches

| Pos. | No. | Nat. | Name |
|---|---|---|---|
| | 4 | (Tanzania) | Mushi, Jonas |
| | 5 | (Tanzania) | Kusiga, Frank |
| | 6 | (Tanzania) | Tukunjoba, Kaikai |
| | 7 | (Tanzania) | Majura, Enerico |
| | 8 | (Tanzania) | Mshana, Stephano |
| | 9 | (Tanzania) | Lukumay, Richard |
| | 10 | (Tanzania) | Mwenda, Ally |
| | 11 | (Tanzania) | Athumani, Baraka |
| | 12 | (Tanzania) | Chibura, Denis |
| | 13 | (Tanzania) | Mbegu, Haji |
| | 14 | (Tanzania) | Mgaza, Cornelius |
| | 15 | (Tanzania) | Mwamwifu, Gwalugano |

Head coach

- (Tanzania) Alfred Makoye Ng'Halaliji

Legend

- (C) Team captain
- (I) Import player
- Injured

- Roster
Updated: 26 November 2019
