= UNZA Pacers =

Zambian basketball team

- Leagues: Midlands Basketball Association
- Head coach: Cuthbert Tembo
- Ownership: University of Zambia

The University of Zambia Pacers, better known as UNZA Pacers, is a Zambian basketball team based in Lusaka. The team plays in the Midlands Basketball Association (MBA). It is the basketball section of the University of Zambia.

Representing Zambia, the Pacers played in the qualifying tournaments for the inaugural BAL season. The Pacers finished second in Group E to advance to the Elite 16.

== Honours ==
Zambia Basketball League

- Champions: 2013, 2018

== In African competitions ==
BAL Qualifiers (1 appearance)

2020 – first round
