= Álvaro Calvo Masa =

Spanish basketball player (born 1983)

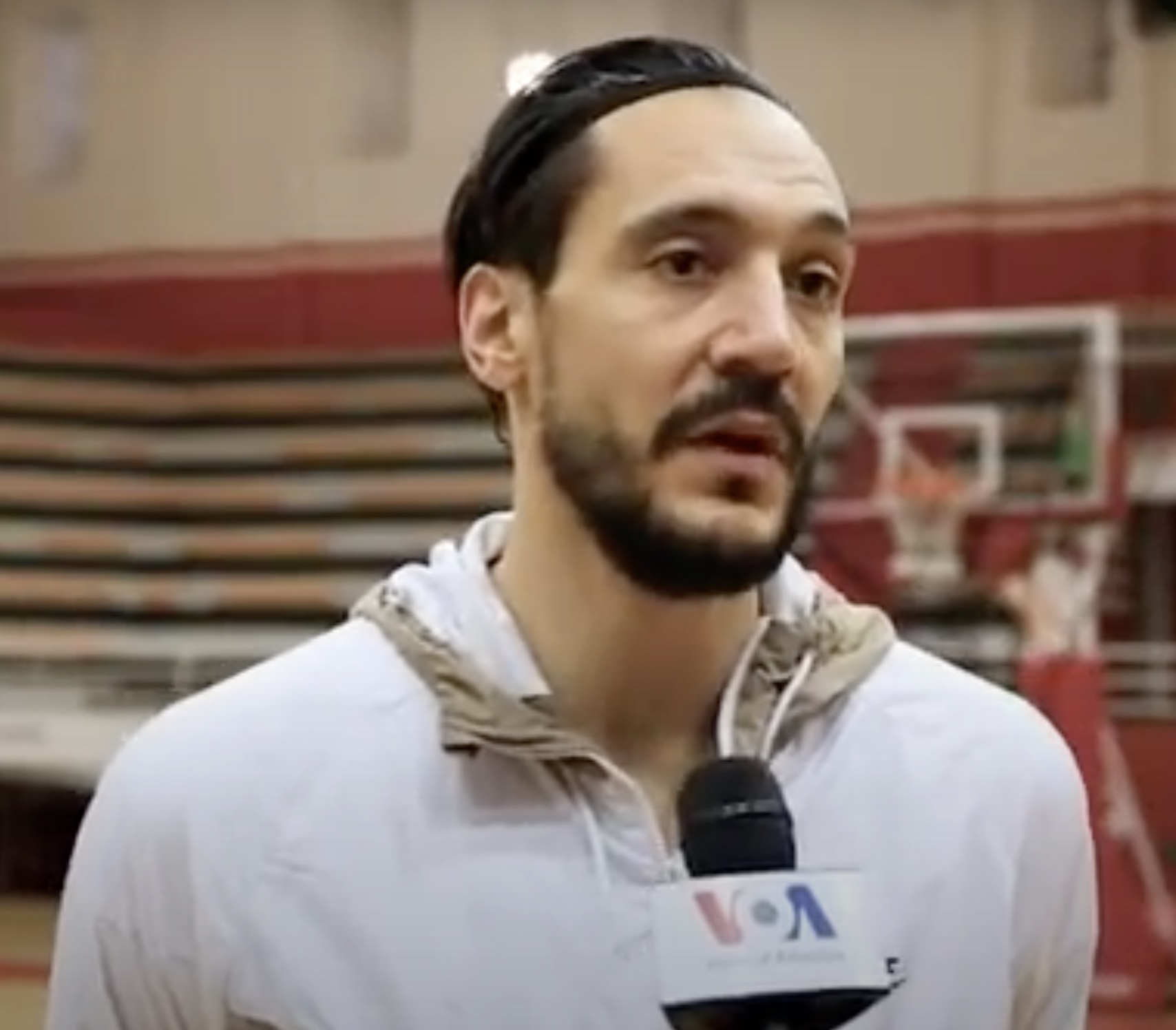
- Calvo Masa in 2022

No. 25 – Costa do Sol
- Position: Power forward
- League: Mozambican Basketball League

Personal information
- Born: 27 March 1983 (age 42) Palencia, Spain
- Listed height: 2.03 m (6 ft 8 in)
- Listed weight: 95 kg (209 lb)

Career information
- NBA draft: 2005: undrafted
- Playing career: 2001–present

Career history
- 2001–2002: Caja Rioja
- 2002–2003: Tenerife Baloncesto
- 2003–2004: Doncel La Serena
- 2004: Melilla
- 2004: CI Rosalía de Castro
- 2006–2007: Valladolid
- 2007–2008: Lausanne Morges Basket
- 2008–2009: Canarias
- 2009–2010: La Romana Chola
- 2010: Santiago Plaza Valerio
- 2010: Centro
- 2010: Acereros de Guayana
- 2010: Rojos de Sucre
- 2011: Toros de Aragua
- 2011–2013: AE São José
- 2013–2014: Trepça
- 2014–2015: Rio Claro Basquete
- 2015–2016: Vitória
- 2016–2017: Ferro Carril Oeste
- 2017–2018: CD Valdivia
- 2018–2021: Ferroviário de Maputo
- 2018: CD Aleman Concepcion
- 2021: New Star
- 2022: AS Salé
- 2022: Urunani
- 2023: Kigali Titans
- 2024–present: Costa do Sol

Career highlights
- Moroccan League champion (2022); 2× Mozambican League MVP (2018, 2019); 2× Mozambican League champion (2018, 2019)

Álvaro Calvo Masa (born 27 March 1983) is a Spanish basketball player who plays for Costa do Sol of the Liga Moçambicana de Basquetebol (LMB). Standing at 2.03 m (6 ft 8 in), he plays as power forward. He is a two-time Most Valuable Player of the Mozambican League.

== Career ==
In his career, he has spent time in Europe, South America and Africa. Since 2018, Masa plays for Ferroviário de Maputo in Mozambique. He is a two-time Mozambican League champion and most valuable player. He was the leading scorer for his team in the 2021 BAL season with 19.8 points, helping Ferroviário reach the quarterfinals.

On 15 February 2023, Calvo Masa signed for the Kigali Titans of the Rwanda Basketball League (RBL).

In September 2024, he joined Costa do Sol, the reigning champions of Mozambique.

== BAL career statistics ==
Legend
GP	Games played	GS	Games started	MPG	Minutes per game
FG%	Field goal percentage	3P%	3-point field goal percentage	FT%	Free throw percentage
RPG	Rebounds per game	APG	Assists per game	SPG	Steals per game
BPG	Blocks per game	PPG	Points per game	**Bold**	Career high

Year	Team	GP	GS	MPG	FG%	3P%	FT%	RPG	APG	SPG	BPG	PPG
2021	Ferroviário	4	4	**34.5**	.407	.292	.857	**9.5**	**2.3**	**1.3**	**.5**	**19.8**
2022	Salé	**6**	**6**	28.0	**.480**	**.400**	.857	8.5	1.2	1.2	.3	11.7
