= Kurasini Heat =

- League: Regional Basketball League; National Basketball League
- Location: Dar es Salaam, Tanzania
- Championships: '1 NBL championship 1 RBL championship 1 Siwhata Cup
Home	Away

Kurasini Heat is a Tanzanian basketball club based in Dar es Salaam. The team competes in the Regional Basketball League (RBL) and the National Basketball League (NBL).

In 2020, the Heat won its first NBL championship. As such, the team claimed a ticket to play in the qualifiers for the 2022 BAL season.

== Honours ==
National Basketball League

- Champions (1): 2020

Regional Basketball League (RBL)

- Champions (1): 2020

Shiwata Cup

- Champions (1): 2007

== Players ==
=== Current roster ===
The following is the Kurasini Heat roster for the 2022 BAL Qualifying Tournaments.

Note: Flags indicate national team eligibility at FIBA-sanctioned events. Players may hold other non-FIBA nationalities not displayed.

Kurasini Heat roster
Players
Coaches

Pos.	No.	Nat.	Name
	7	(Tanzania)	Musongole, Alimani
	8	(Tanzania)	Mhoja, Deogratius
	9	(Tanzania)	Simba, Maftah
	10	(Tanzania)	Augustino, Enerico
	11	(Tanzania)	Basco, Jimmy
	13	(Tanzania)	Fundi, Yassin
	15	(Tanzania)	Muruga, Musa
	16	(Tanzania)	Chuma, Fadhili
	22	(Tanzania)	Mwaipyanah, Jackson
	24	(Tanzania)	Lugora, Erick
	28	(Tanzania)	Njovu, Dominick
	34	(Tanzania)	Mwamwaja, Isaya

Head coach

- (Tanzania)

Legend

- (C) Team captain
- Injured

- Roster
Updated: October 31, 2021
