= Hawassa City B.C. =

Ethiopian basketball club based in Hawassa

Hawassa City
- Leagues: Ethiopian Basketball Premier League; BAL Qualifying Tournaments
- Founded: 1977 (1970 in the Ethiopian calendar)
- Location: Hawassa, Ethiopia

Hawassa City Basketball Club is an Ethiopian basketball club from Hawassa. The team plays in the Ethiopian Basketball Premier League.

In October 2019, Hawassa City made their debut in the qualifying tournaments for the Basketball Africa League.

The team was originally scheduled to play in the 2022 BAL Qualifying Tournaments but withdrew.

== In African competitions ==
BAL Qualifiers (2 appearances)

2021 – First round
2022 – Withdrew
