= National Basketball League (Tanzania) =

- Organising body: Tanzania Basketball Federation
- Country: Tanzania
- Number of teams: 10
- Level on pyramid: 1
- Relegation to: First Division
- International cup(s): Basketball Africa League (BAL)
- Current champions: Dar City (1st title) (2024)

The National Basketball League (NBL), for sponsorships reasons known as the betPawa National Basketball League, is the premier basketball league for clubs in Tanzania. The league is organized by the Tanzania Basketball Federation (TBF) and consist out of 10 teams.

The champions of the NBL are eligible to play in Road to BAL, the qualifying rounds of the Basketball Africa League (BAL).

== Format ==
As of the 2024 season, ten teams are divided in three groups (A, B and C) for the first round, from which the best eight teams qualify for the quarterfinals. In the 2024 season, the champions received TSh 2,800,000, while the runners-up received TSh 1,400,000. Teams receive a "Lockerroom Bonus" of TSh 140,000 per won game.

== Current teams ==
The following were the twelve teams for the 2020 season:

- ABC
- Chang'ombe Boys
- Chui
- JKT
- Oilers Club
- Pazi
- PT Stars
- Savio Basketball Club
- Tanzania Prisons
- Don Bosco Panthers
- Vijana City Bulls
- Kurasini Heat

== Champions ==
| Season | Champions | Runners-up | Finals score | Third place | Ref. |
|---|---|---|---|---|---|
| 2008 | Savio | | | | |
| 2010 | Savio | JKT | | | |
| 2013 | ABC | Vijana City Bulls | 93–81 | | |
| 2014 | ABC | | | | |
| 2017 | JKT | Oilers Club | 90–82 | | |
| 2018 | Savio | | | | |
| 2020 | Kurasini Heat | Oilers Club | 76–59 | Don Bosco Panthers | |
| 2021 | ABC | | | | |
| 2022 | Pazi | Tarangire | 119–48 | ABC | |
| 2023 | JKT | ABC | 68-45 | Kisasa Heroes | |
| 2024 | Dar City | ABC | 2–0 (series) | UDSM-Outsiders | |

== Supercup winners ==
| Season | Champions | Runners-up | Ref. |
|---|---|---|---|
| 2008 | Savio | Vijana City Bulls | |
