= Nigelec BC =

Nigelec
- Nickname: Électriciens (Electricians)
- Arena: Palais du 29 Juillet
- Location: Niamey, Niger
- Head coach: Amadou Karimou
- Ownership: NIGELEC
Home	Away

Association Sportive Nigelec Basket Club, commonly known as Nigelec, is a basketball team based in Niamey, Niger. The team is owned by NIGELEC, a state-owned electric power generator company in the country. The team is nicknamed Électriciens (Electricians).

Representing Niger, the team participated in the Road to BAL in the 2021, 2022 and 2023 tournaments. Under head coach Amadou Karimou, they reached the second round Elite 16 twice, despite never qualifying for the main tournament.

== Arena ==
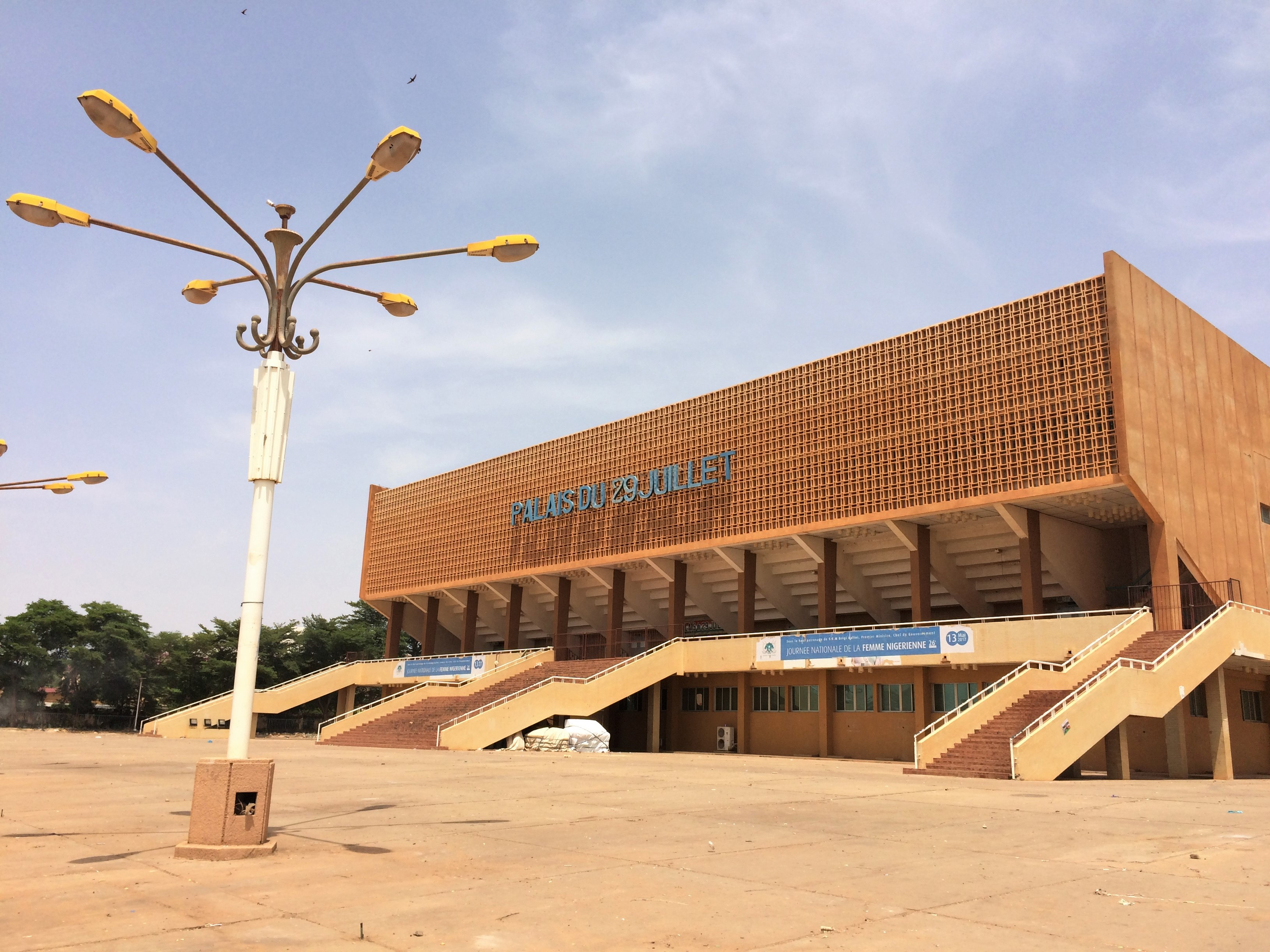
The Palais de 29 Juillet, where the team plays most of its games

Games of AS Nigelec, as for other basketball teams in Niger, are usually played at the Palais de 29 Juillet (Palace of 29 July).

== Honours ==
Coupe du Président de la République

- Champions: 2019

== Performance in the Road to BAL ==
Competition	Season	Coach	Won	Lost	Win %	Final stage	Top scorer
Road to BAL	2021	Amadou Karimou	3	4	.429	Eliminated in Elite 16 group stage	Abdoulaye Harouna (24.3)
Road to BAL	2022	Amadou Karimou	2	2	.500	Eliminated in Elite 16 group stage	Timothy Kwaor (19.0)
Road to BAL	2023	Amadou Karimou	0	3	.000	Eliminated in first round	Not recorded
Road to BAL	2024	Withdrew participation					
Totals			5	9	.357	—	

== Players ==
=== 2022 roster ===
The following was the Nigelec BC roster in the 2022 BAL Qualifying Tournaments.

Note: Flags indicate national team eligibility at FIBA-sanctioned events. Players may hold other non-FIBA nationalities not displayed.

Nigelec roster
Players
Coaches

Pos.	No.	Nat.	Name
PG	4	(Niger)	Moumouni, Issoufou
	5	(Niger)	Abdou, Mamane
	7	(Niger)	Elh Kadir, Abdouikarim
	8	(Niger)	Yaye, Abdoul
F	10	(Niger)	Mamane, Djibrilla
F	14	(Niger)	Tahirou, Abdoul
PG	15	(Niger)	Moussa, Mahamadou
		(Niger)	Maidoka, Ferdjani
F		(Nigeria)	Goodwin, David
		(Nigeria)	Gar, Kator
		(Nigeria)	Okoye, Basil

Head coach

- (Niger) Amadou Karimou

Legend

- (C) Team captain
- Injured

- Roster
Updated: October 29, 2021

== Notable players ==
- Abdoulaye Harouna (2019–2020)
