= Palais des Sports de Libreville =

Multi-sports arena in Libreville, Gabon

- Interactive map of Palais des Sports de Libreville
- Full name: Palais des Sports de Libreville
- Location: Quartier Petit-Paris, 3rd arrondissement, Libreville, Gabon
- Coordinates: 0°23′41″N 9°27′10″E
- Owner: Government of Gabon
- Capacity: 5,358 (seated); c. 6,000 (total)
- Type: Multi-purpose indoor arena
- Surface: 15,220 m² total; 8,000 m² playing area

Construction
- Groundbreaking: 13 April 2017
- Built: 2017–2018
- Opened: 16 January 2018
- Project manager: Société nouvelle générale d'études (SNGE)
- General contractor: China State Construction Engineering Corporation

The Palais des Sports de Libreville (English: Sports Palace of Libreville) is a multi-purpose indoor arena in Libreville, the capital of Gabon. Situated in the Petit-Paris neighbourhood of the city's 3rd arrondissement, immediately adjacent to the Stade Omar Bongo omnisports complex, the venue was purpose-built to host the 2018 African Men's Handball Championship and inaugurated on 16 January 2018 by President Ali Bongo Ondimba. With a total built area of 15,220 m², including an 8,000 m² playing surface, and a capacity of roughly 6,000, it is one of the largest indoor venues in Central Africa.

== Construction ==
The arena was developed as a flagship of Sino-Gabonese cooperation under a public–private partnership. The main contractor was the China State Construction Engineering Corporation (CSCEC), the same firm that had recently completed the Michel Essongue gymnasium in Port-Gentil, while project supervision and technical control were entrusted to the Gabonese firm Société nouvelle générale d'études (SNGE). Ground was broken in April 2017, and works were scheduled so the building could be delivered before the start of the 23rd African Men's Handball Championship, which Gabon was due to host in January 2018. In September 2017, four months ahead of the tournament, Minister of Sports Mathias Otounga Ossibadjouo reported that the project had reached around 40% completion.

Published capacities for the arena vary. At the time of the inauguration, Gabonese news outlet Le Nouveau Gabon reported 5,358 seats, whereas more recent official and media references describe the venue as having "around 6,000 places". The building was conceived as a multi-functional venue able to host handball, basketball, volleyball, tennis, futsal and combat sports, and was also designed with accessibility features for athletes with disabilities.

== Inauguration ==
President Ali Bongo Ondimba formally inaugurated the Palais des Sports on 16 January 2018, on the eve of the African Men's Handball Championship. The ceremony was attended by members of government, the then-Mayor of Libreville Rose Christiane Ossouka Raponda and officials of the Confederation of African Handball, and was presented as the centrepiece of the government's "seven-year plan for youth".

== Events ==
=== Handball ===
The arena hosted every match of the 2018 African Men's Handball Championship, held from 17 to 27 January 2018. The tournament gathered ten national teams and served as the African qualifying competition for the 2019 World Men's Handball Championship. In the final, played at the Palais des Sports, Tunisia defeated Egypt 26–24 to claim a record-extending tenth continental title, while hosts Gabon finished fifth—their best-ever placement in the competition.

=== Basketball ===
In October 2019, the Palais des Sports hosted Group C of the West Division first round of the inaugural Basketball Africa League qualifying tournament (the "Road to BAL"). Matches were played between Forces Armées et Police (Cameroon), Manga Sport of Gabon, ASB Mazembe of the Democratic Republic of the Congo and Virgen María de África of Equatorial Guinea. In April 2025, the president of FIBA Africa Zone 4, Éric Aimé Niat, visited the facility during the Super Coupe du Gabon and pledged to support the federation's efforts to return the arena to international competition.

=== COVID-19 repurposing ===
On 19 May 2020, during the COVID-19 pandemic, the venue was requisitioned by the government and converted into a large-scale biomedical laboratory. Named the Laboratoire Pr Daniel Gahouma—in memory of the Gabonese paediatrician Daniel Gahouma, who had died the previous day after contracting COVID-19—the facility was designed to process up to 10,000 PCR tests per day. It became operational on 25 May 2020 at a reported cost of close to 3 billion CFA francs; by mid-July 2020, the laboratory was responsible for more than 42% of all COVID-19 tests performed in Gabon.

The prolonged presence of the laboratory took a heavy toll on the building's sporting fittings. In March 2024, the Ministry of Sports acknowledged that the arena's parquet floor was "no longer suitable" for national or international competition and announced that two companies had submitted bids for refurbishment works, with the explicit aim of "restoring the lustre of the Palais des Sports and enabling it to reconnect with national and international competition".

=== Inclusive National Dialogue (2024) ===
Following the 2023 Gabonese coup d'état, the arena hosted the opening ceremony of the Dialogue national inclusif (Inclusive National Dialogue) on 2 April 2024, presided over by transitional president Brice Oligui Nguema in the presence of Central African Republic president Faustin-Archange Touadéra and Archbishop of Libreville Jean-Patrick Iba-Ba, who chaired the talks. Around 600 delegates met at the venue between 2 and 30 April 2024 to prepare a roadmap for the country's return to constitutional rule.

== Location ==
The arena stands in the Petit-Paris neighbourhood of Libreville's 3rd arrondissement, between the Stade Omar Bongo and the former annex stadium, and within walking distance of the Mont-Bouët market.

== See also ==
- Sport in Gabon
- Stade Omar Bongo
- 2018 African Men's Handball Championship
