= Lions B.C. =

Lions
- Leagues: KBA Premier League
- Location: Windhoek, Namibia
- Head coach: Anthony Williams Auchab
- Championships: 1 (2018)
Home	FF0000

Lions Basketball Club, also known as simply Lions, is a Namibian basketball team based in Windhoek. The team plays in the Khomas Region's KBA Premier League.

The team won the KBA Premier League title twice, in 2015 after suffering just one defeat in the season, as well as in 2018.

In October 2019, under coach Anthony Williams Auchab, the Lions represented Namibia in the 2021 qualification tournaments for the Basketball Africa League (BAL), as the first Namibian team to play in the competition. On 24 October 2019, they won their first game against South African side Jozi Nuggets, defeating them 74-67. The Lions finished with in the 4th place of Group E with a 1-4 record.

== Honours ==
KBA Premier League

- Champions (1): 2015, 2018

== In African competitions ==
Road to BAL (1 appearance)

2021 – first round

== Players ==
=== 2019 roster ===
The following was the Lions roster in the 2021 BAL qualifiers:

Note: Flags indicate national team eligibility at FIBA-sanctioned events. Players may hold other non-FIBA nationalities not displayed.

Lions Club roster
Players
Coaches

Pos.	No.	Nat.	Name
	00	(Namibia)	Iyambo, Petrus
	2	(Namibia)	Chonhi, Guilherme
	5	(Namibia)	Paulus, Make
	6	(Namibia)	Nghixulifwa, Alan
	8	(Namibia)	Prinzonsky, Corbin
	9	(Namibia)	Kazeurua, Mabeth
	10	(Namibia)	Mukumbutaa, Michael
	11	(Namibia)	Mael, Firmino
	13	(Namibia)	Katoko, Michael
	14	(Namibia)	Ndjavera, Yarouvandu
	17	(Namibia)	Tjirimuje, Kautjeza
	23	(Zambia)	Banda, Joe

Head coach

- (Namibia) Anthony Williams Auchab

Legend

- (C) Team captain
- Injured

- Roster
Updated: 20 October 2019
