= ASPAC BC =

Basketball club in Cotonou, Benin

ASPAC
- Nickname: Les Bleus et blancs (The Blue and whites)
- Leagues: Benin Basketball Super League
- Founded: 1968
- Location: Cotonou, Benin
- President: Wahabou Adam Chabi
- Ownership: Port of Cotonou
Home

Association Sportive du Port Autonome de Cotonou BC, better known as ASPAC BC is a Beninese basketball club based in Cotonou. It is the basketball team of the Port Autonome de Cotonou, one of the chief ports in Benin. The team plays in the Benin Basketball Super League.

In 2005 and 2007, ASPAC played in the FIBA Africa Champions Cup with its best result being the 5th place in 2007. In October 2019, ASPAC played in the qualifying tournaments for the Basketball Africa League.

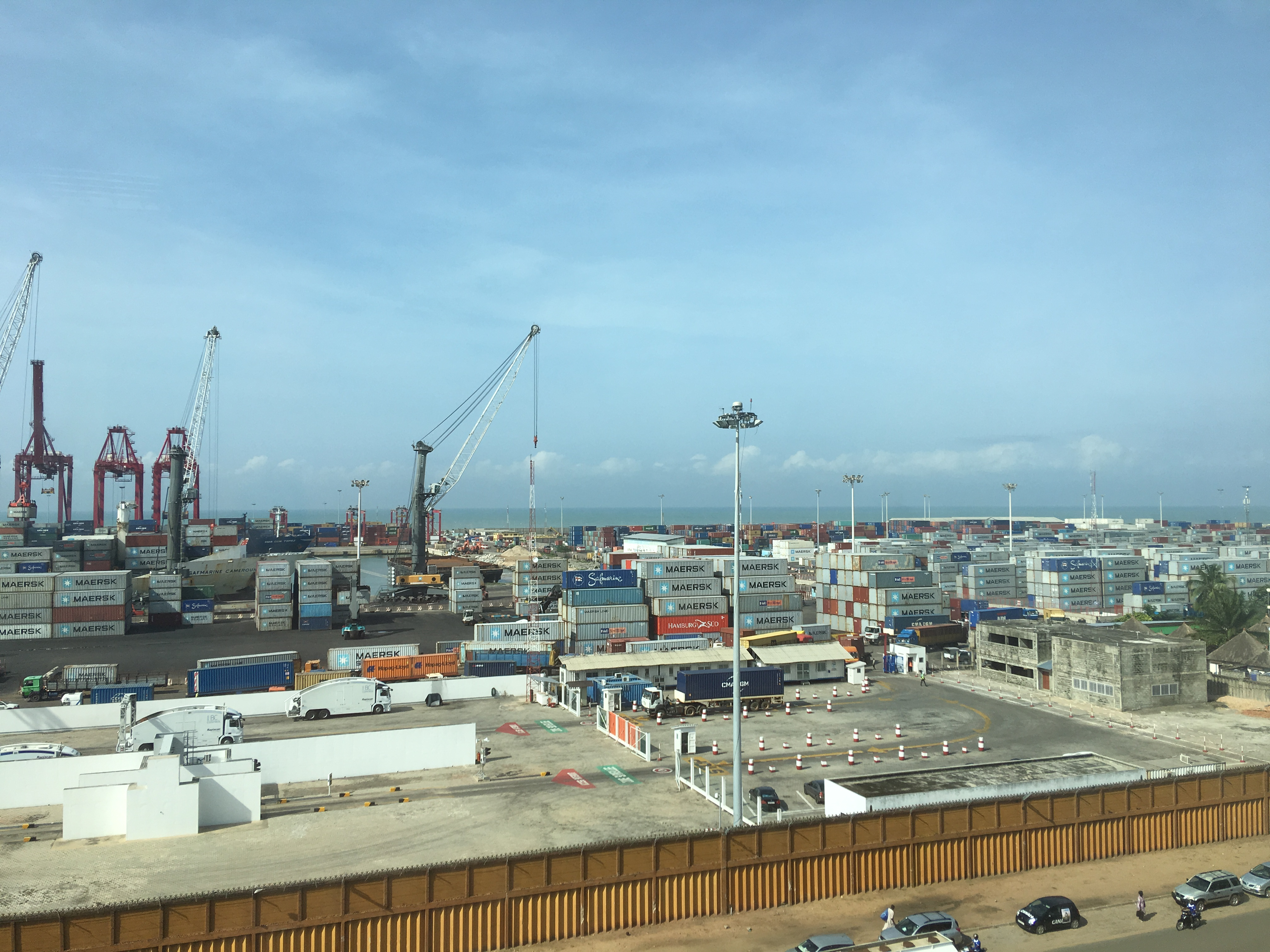
The Port of Cotonou, which fully owns the team

== In African competitions ==
FIBA Africa Clubs Champions Cup (2 appearances)

2007 – Tenth Place
2009 – Sixth Place

BAL Qualifiers (1 appearance)

2020 – First Round

== Players ==
=== Current roster ===
The following is the ASPAC BC roster for the 2022 BAL Qualifying Tournaments.

Note: Flags indicate national team eligibility at FIBA-sanctioned events. Players may hold other non-FIBA nationalities not displayed.

ASPAC roster
Players
Coaches

Pos.	No.	Nat.	Name
	4	(Benin)	Alassane, Fadayilou
F	5	(Benin)	Adjado, Roland
G	6	(Benin)	Gbegnon, Ayi
	7	(Benin)	Baboni Mama, Tawadioun
PG	9	(Benin)	Ahivohozin, Tankpinou
PG	11	(Benin)	Lougbegnon, Bernard
	12	(Togo)	Koudoyor, Ekue
F	14	(Benin)	Houenou, Joel
C	15	(Benin)	Yabi, Daniel
C	20	(Nigeria)	Ejeh, Ameh

Head coach

- Vacant

Legend

- (C) Team captain
- Injured

- Roster
Updated: October 31, 2021
