= NPA Pythons =

- Leagues: Liberia Basketball Association
- Location: Monrovia, Liberia
- Championships: 2007, 2009

The National Port Authority Pythons, better known as simply NPA Pythons, is a Liberian basketball team based in Monrovia. It is the basketball team of the National Port Authority organization. The team plays in the LBA League, the top professional league in Libera.

== Honours ==
- LBA League

2007, 2019

== In African competitions ==
BAL Qualifiers (1 appearance)

2020 – First Round
