= Beau Vallon Heat =

Basketball team in Seychelles

- Nickname: BV Heat
- Leagues: Seychelles Basketball League
- Location: Beau Vallon, Seychelles
- Head coach: Augustin Scholastique

Beau Vallon Heat is a basketball club based in Beau Vallon, Seychelles. The team plays in the Seychelles Basketball League (SBL).

In 2020, the Heat made its debut in the first year of qualifying rounds of the Basketball Africa League (BAL). They made their second appearance in 2023.

== Honours ==
Seychelles Basketball League

- Champions: 2016, 2018, 2022

SBF Cup / Land Marine Cup

- Winners: 2017, 2022

Seychelles End-of-the-Year Tournament

- Winners: 2020

== In African competitions ==
BAL Qualifiers (2 appearances)

2020 – first round
2023 – To be determined

== Players ==
=== Current roster ===
The following is the Beau Vallon Heat roster for the 2024 BAL qualification.

Note: Flags indicate national team eligibility at FIBA-sanctioned events. Players may hold other non-FIBA nationalities not displayed.

Beau Vallon Heat roster
Players
Coaches

Pos.	No.	Nat.	Name	Ht.	Age
G	5	(Seychelles)	Bristol, Gerald	1.79 m (5 ft 10 in)	26 – 24 August 1998
SG	7	(Seychelles)	Adam, Timmy Michel	1.96 m (6 ft 5 in)	38 – 6 March 1987
G	10	(Seychelles)	Malbrook, Stephen	1.83 m (6 ft 0 in)	38 – 22 February 1987
PF	11	(Seychelles)	Maimee, Aurélien	1.93 m (6 ft 4 in)	25 – 12 November 1999
G	20	(Seychelles)	Alao, Solomon	1.88 m (6 ft 2 in)	37 – 31 May 1987
C	21	(Nigeria)	Oliseh, Uneadi James	1.98 m (6 ft 6 in)	30 – 22 September 1994
PG	22	(Seychelles)	Andre, Kris	1.86 m (6 ft 1 in)	24 – 5 May 2000
PG	23	(Zimbabwe)	Mutyambizi, Denzel	1.88 m (6 ft 2 in)	28 – 15 November 1996
C	34	(Seychelles)	Naiken, Faisel Jossy	1.93 m (6 ft 4 in)	37 – 11 May 1987
PF	36	(Seychelles)	Baron, Alex	1.92 m (6 ft 4 in)	41 – 22 May 1983
PG	45	(Seychelles)	Agathine, Ervin	1.80 m (5 ft 11 in)	31 – 5 November 1993
C	82	(Seychelles)	Chang-Time, Damien	1.95 m (6 ft 5 in)	25 – 28 June 1999

Head coach

- (Seychelles) Augustin Scholastique

Assistant coach(es)

- (Seychelles) Steven Ronny Andrew

Legend

- (C) Team captain
- Injured

- Roster
Updated: 8 October 2023

== Head coaches ==
- Timmy Adam (2019)
- Augustin Scholastique (2023)
