= Virgen María de África BC =

Virgen María de África
- Nickname: VMA
- Location: Equatorial Guinea
Home	Away

Virgen María de África BC is an Equatoguinean basketball club. The club's colors are orange and white.

In 2019, the team competed in the inaugural qualifiers for the Basketball Africa League. In Group C, Virgen ended with a 0–3 record while Francisco Mba Nzang led the team in scoring.

== In African competitions ==
BAL Qualifiers (1 appearance)

2020 – first round

== Notable players ==
- (Equatorial Guinea) Frank Mba
