= Usoni Club =

- Leagues: Comoros Basketball Championship
- Arena: Stade Missiri
- Location: Mutsamudu, Comoros
- Championships: 2 (2016, 2017)

Usoni Club de Mutsamudu, better known as simply Usoni, is a Comorian basketball club based in Mutsamudu. The club's colors are blue and white and they play in the Comoros Basketball Championship.

In 2019, the team competed in the inaugural qualifiers for the Basketball Africa League. The team had a 0–4 record while Soula El Had led the team in scoring.

== Honours ==
Comoros Basketball Championship

- Champions: 2016, 2017
