= Yaoundé Multipurpose Sports Complex =

Indoor sports venue in Cameroon

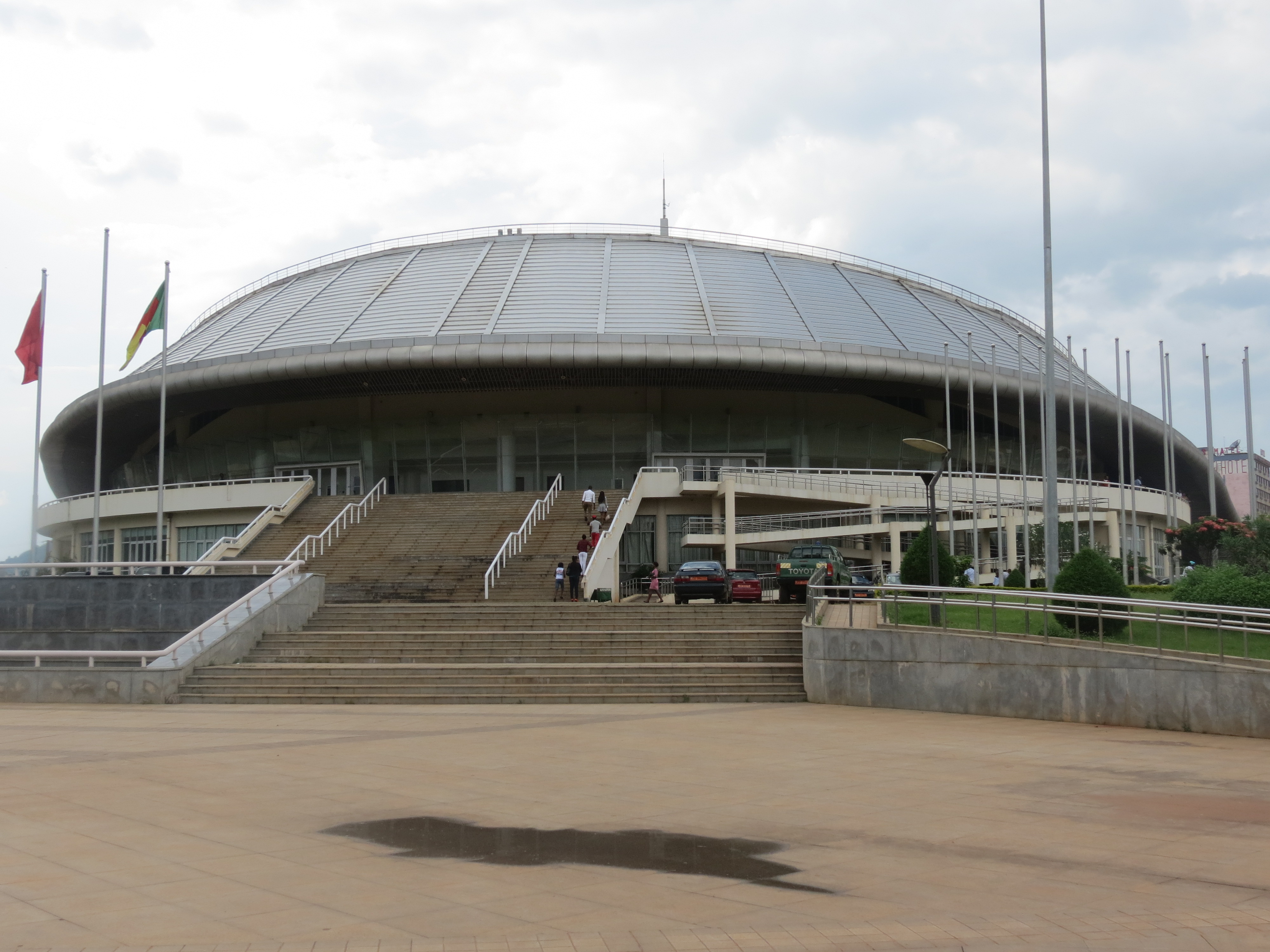
- Yaoundé Multipurpose Sports Complex
- Interactive map of Yaoundé Multipurpose Sports Complex
- Location: Yaoundé, Cameroon
- Coordinates: 3.873974°N 11.512041°E
- Owner: State-owned
- Capacity: 5,263

Construction
- Opened: 19 June 2009

The Yaoundé Multipurpose Sports Complex (French: Palais polyvalent des sports de Yaoundé) is an indoor sporting arena located in Yaoundé, Cameroon. The capacity of the arena is 5,263 people. It is used to host indoor sports such as basketball.

It was built by the People's Republic of China and was inaugurated on 19 June 2009.

== Photos ==
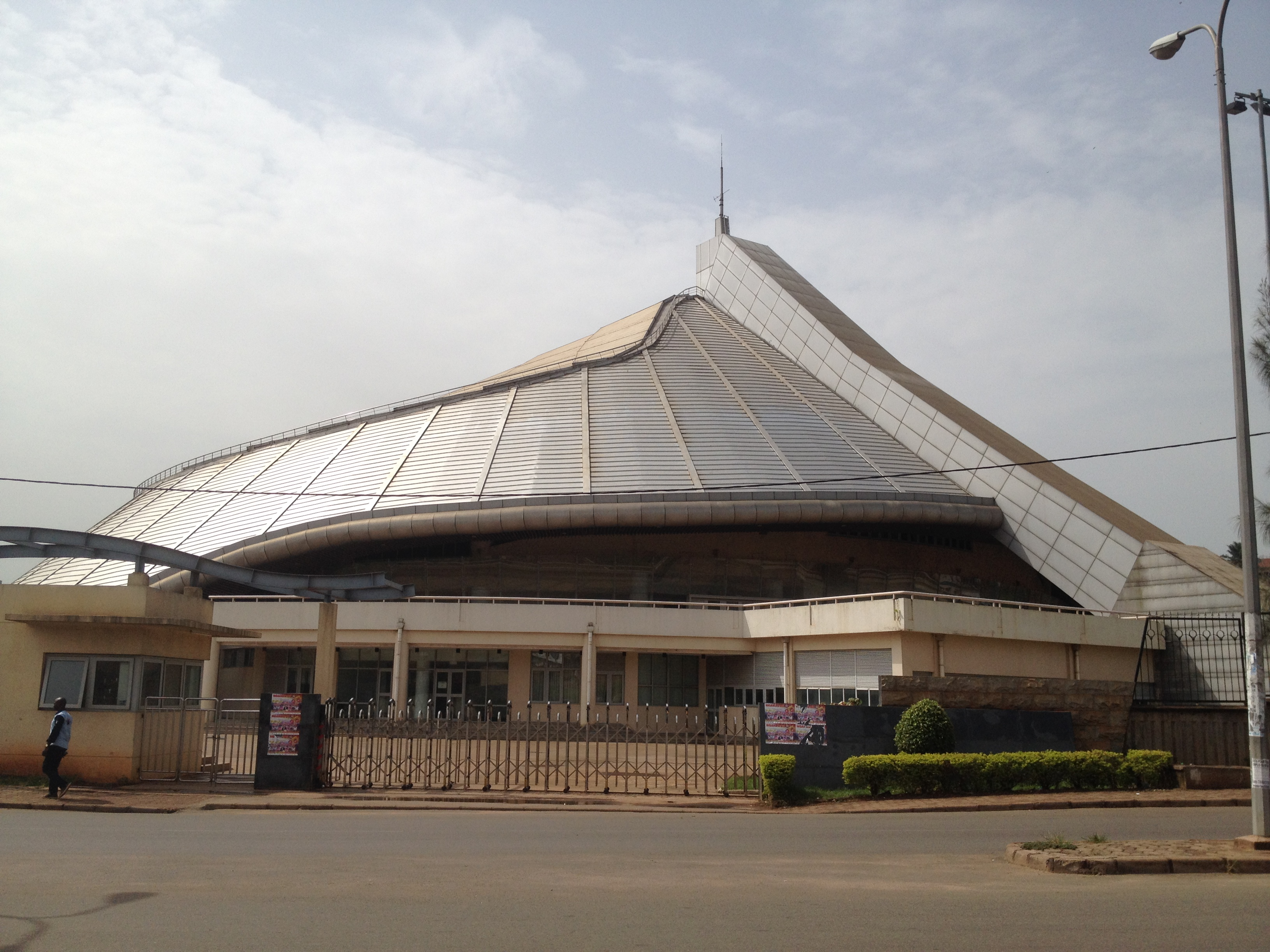
Side view

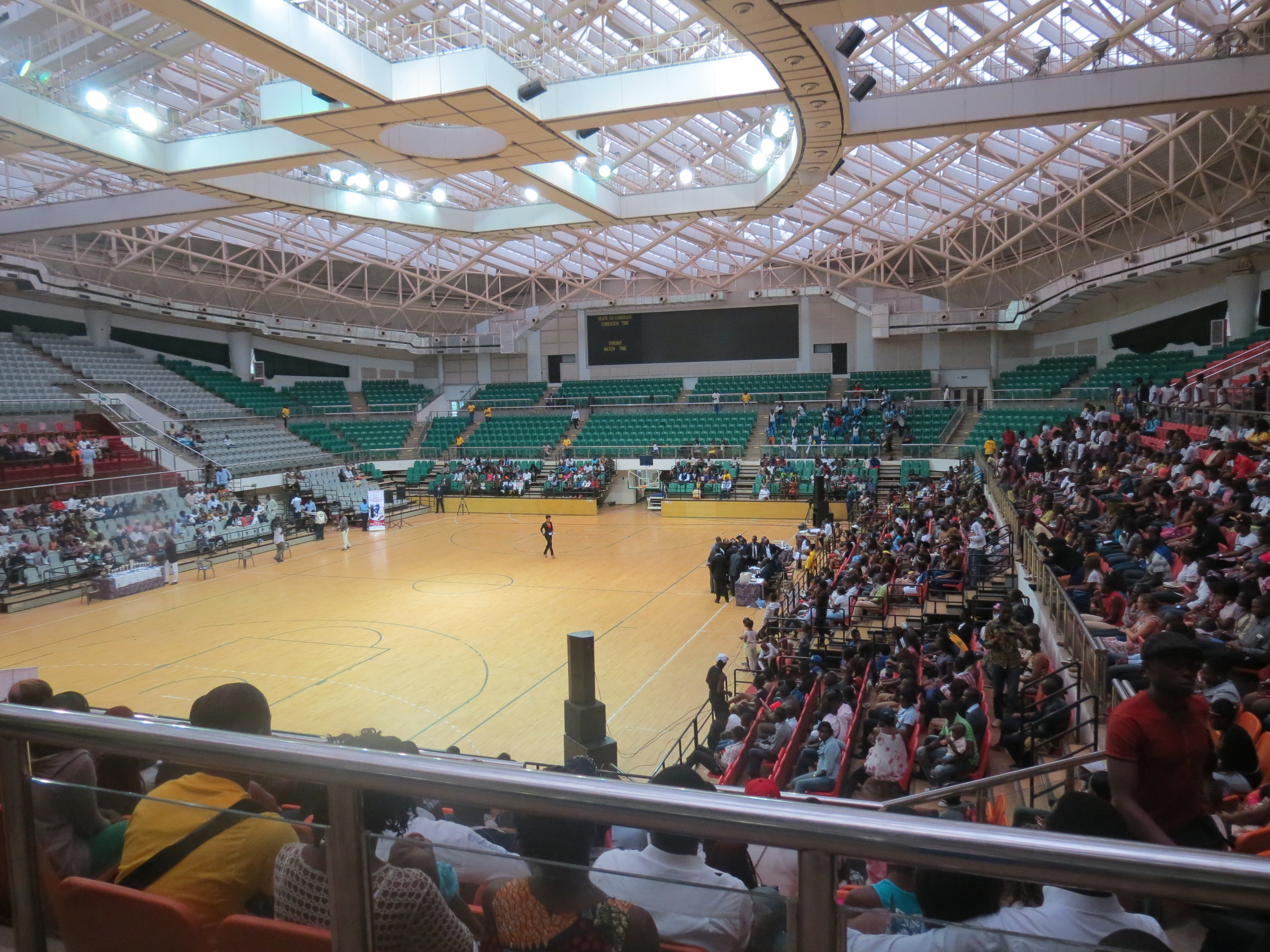
Inside view

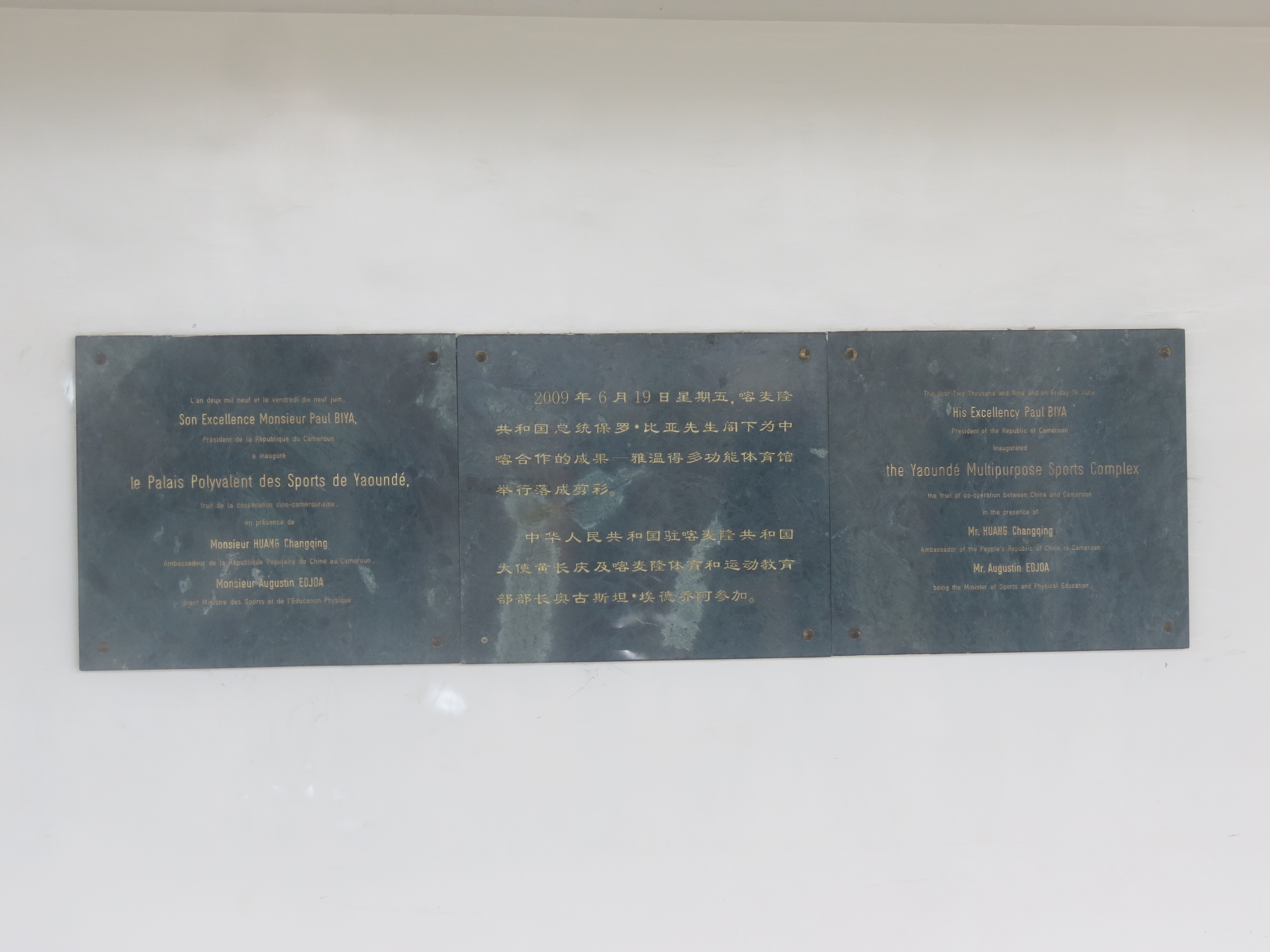
A plaque commemorating the inauguration

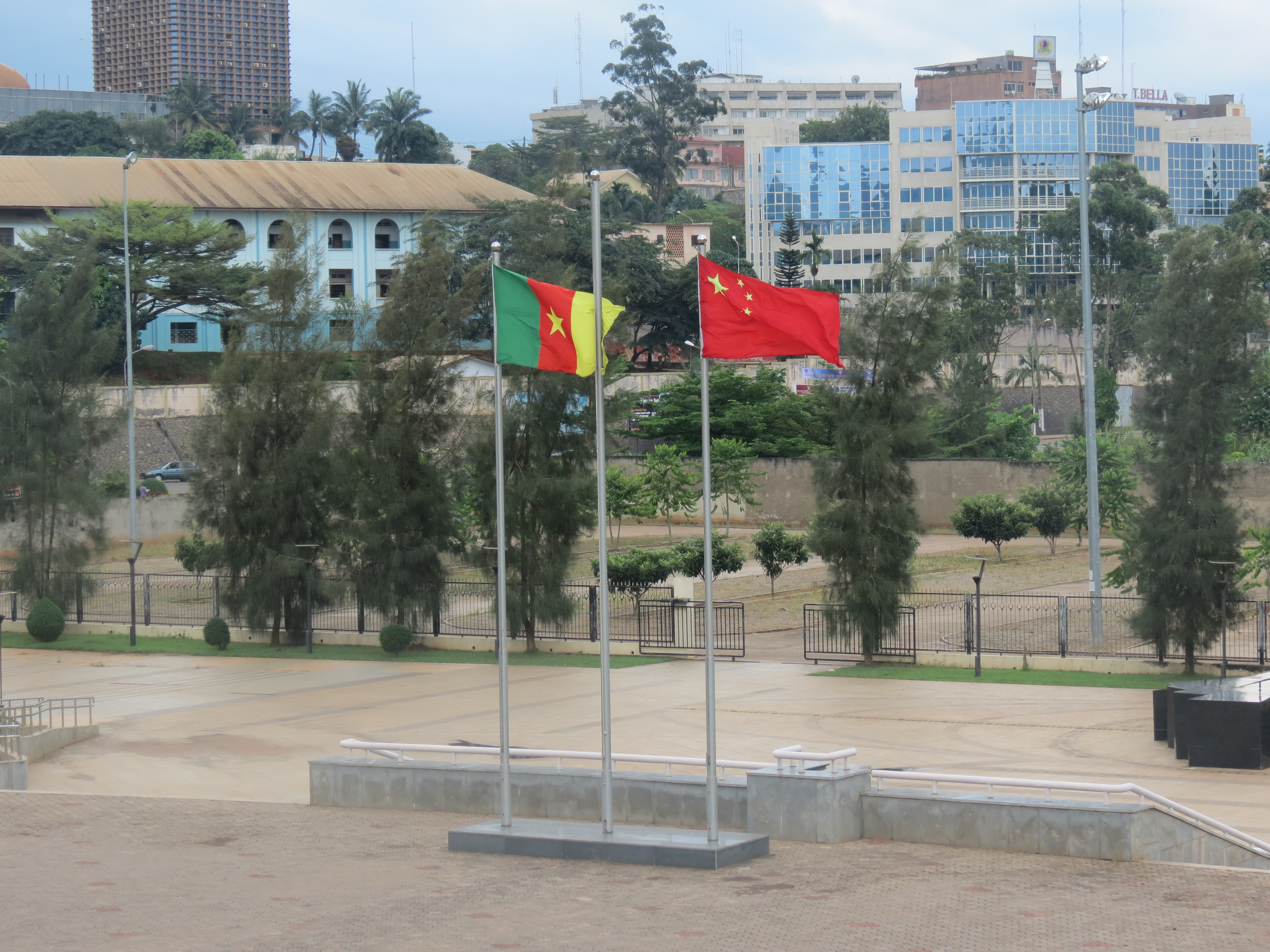
Cameroonian and Chinese flags flying in front of the Sports Palace
