= 2021–22 Cobra Sport season =

The 2021–22 Cobra Sport season was a season of Cobra Sport, a South Sudanese basketball club. They qualified for the 2022 BAL season, as the first team from South Sudan to do so.

In the 2021 BAL qualification, Cobra was led by head coach John Omondi and progressed through the first round with a wild card, despite not winning any games. In the Elite 16, following a win over the Ulinzi Warriors, they advanced to the semifinals. There, on 10 December 2021, Cobra defeated New Star from Burundi, to qualify for their first-ever BAL season.

The team was coached by Manny Berberi and played in the Nile Conference, where they finished in the fifth place with a 1–4 record. Cobra player Mayan Kiir led the league in rebounds per game, and also set a then-record of most rebounds in a game.

== Rosters ==
=== BAL roster ===
Cobra Sport roster
Players
Coaches

Pos.	No.	Nat.	Name	Ht.	Age
PG	00	(South Sudan)	Dieu, Gatwang	1.84 m (6 ft 0 in)	22 – 1 January 2003
PF	1	(South Sudan)	Kiir, Mayan	2.06 m (6 ft 9 in)	27 – 1 January 1998
SF	2	(South Sudan)	Wek, Nyang	1.98 m (6 ft 6 in)	29 – 6 March 1996
G	5	(South Sudan)	Wang, Padiet	1.93 m (6 ft 4 in)	27 – 13 January 1998
PG	10	(United States)	Harrington, Jared (I)	1.96 m (6 ft 5 in)	27 – 23 April 1997
PF	11	(South Sudan)	Lado, Alex (C)	2.01 m (6 ft 7 in)	29 – 13 May 1995
PF	14	(South Sudan)	Deng, David	2.04 m (6 ft 8 in)	24 – 25 June 2000
C	21	(United States)	Hampton, Leon (I)	2.13 m (7 ft 0 in)	29 – 13 June 1995
F	23	(South Sudan)	Malual, Malual	1.87 m (6 ft 2 in)	24 – 30 July 2000
C	24	(South Sudan)	Maluach, Khaman (E)	2.13 m (7 ft 0 in)	18 – 14 September 2006
C	34	(South Sudan)	Akuei, Lual	2.08 m (6 ft 10 in)	34 – 12 January 1991
C		(Kenya)	Wamukota, Tom (injured) (I)	2.13 m (7 ft 0 in)	31 – 8 September 1993

Head coach

- (South Sudan) Manny Berberi

Assistant coach(es)

- (Kenya) John Omondi
- (South Sudan) Majak Kou

Legend

- (C) Team captain
- (I) Import player
- (E): BAL Elevate player
- Injured

- Roster
Updated: April 9, 2022

== Games ==
=== Road to BAL ===
==== First round ====
29 October 2021 1	New Star (Burundi)	67–46	(South Sudan) Cobra Sport	Dar es Salaam, Tanzania

31 October 2021 2	Cobra Sport (South Sudan)	47–53	(Kenya) Ulinzi Warriors	Dar es Salaam, Tanzania

==== Elite 16 ====
===== Group phase =====
6 December 2021 1	Ferroviário da Beira (Mozambique)	76–46	(South Sudan) Cobra Sport	Johannesburg, South Africa
				Arena: Wembley Stadium

7 December 2021 2	Cobra Sport (South Sudan)	77–67	(Kenya) Ulinzi Warriors	Johannesburg, South Africa

===== Semifinal =====
10 December 2021	New Star (Burundi)	76–78	(South Sudan) Cobra Sport	Wembley Stadium, Johannesburg
15:30	Scoring by quarter: 18-13, 19–28, 13–26, 26–11
	Pts: Calvo Masa 33; Rebs: Ndikumana 11; Asts: Gasana 6 PIR: Masa 27	Report	Pts: Tang 27; Rebs: Wamukota 13; Asts: Wamukota, Deng 5 PIR: Ndizeye 20	Arena: Wembley Stadium

===== Final =====
11 December 2021	Cobra Sport (South Sudan)	65–91	(Mozambique) Ferroviário da Beira	Wembley Stadium, Johannesburg
20:00	Scoring by quarter: 12–17, 18–28, 17–30, 18–16
	Pts: Malual 21; Rebs: Mabior 6 Asts: Wamukota 6 PIR: Wamukota 23	Report	Pts: Nurmamade 25; Rebs: Ubisse 9 Asts: Kennedy 7 PIR: Nurmamade 18	Arena: Wembley Stadium

=== BAL ===
9 April 2022 1	Zamalek (Egypt)	80–63	(South Sudan) Cobra Sport	Cairo
20:00	Scoring by quarter: 21–11, 14–17, 27–17, 18–18
Replay	Pts: Ike Diogu 17; Rebs: Anas Mahmoud 11; Asts: Édgar Sosa 8 PIR: Anas Mahmoud 29	Boxscore	Pts: Mayan Kiir 18; Rebs: Mayan Kiir 22; Asts: Padiet Wang 4 PIR: Mayan Kiir 23	Arena: Hassan Moustafa Sports Hall; Attendance: 230; Referees: Julian McFadden, Yann Vezo Davidson, Dorothy Okatch

12 April 2022 2	Petro de Luanda (Angola)	92–56	(South Sudan) Cobra Sport	Cairo
18:30	Scoring by quarter: 37–13, 16–16, 24–11, 15–16
Replay	Pts: Aboubakar Gakou 17; Rebs: Aboubakar Gakou 8 Asts: Carlos Morais 6 PIR: Aboubakar Gakou 22	Boxscore	Pts: Padiet Wang 15; Rebs: Mayan Kiir, Khaman Maluach 6 Asts: Padiet Wang 3 PIR: Padiet Wang 13	Arena: Hassan Moustafa Sports Hall; Attendance: 250; Referees: Omar Bermudez, Amir Taboubi, Monicca Nassuuna

13 April 2022 3	Cobra Sport (South Sudan)	108–82	(Democratic Republic of the Congo) Espoir Fukash	Cairo
18:30	Scoring by quarter: 28–17, 30–21, 27–23, 23–21
Replay	Pts: Mayan Kiir, Padiet Wang 24; Rebs: Mayan Kiir 11; Asts: Padiet Wang 8 PIR: Mayan Kiir 29	Boxscore	Pts: Rolly Fula Nganga 14; Rebs: Emmanuel Okorafor 10; Asts: Arsène Mwamba, Emmanuel Isungu 3 PIR: Emmanuel Okarafor 17	Arena: Hassan Moustafa Sports Hall; Attendance: 100; Referees: Julian McFadden, Dorothy Okatch, Mahamadou Diallo

15 April 2022 4	Cobra Sport (South Sudan)	79–83	(South Africa) Cape Town Tigers	Cairo
18:30	Scoring by quarter: 18–22, 16–13, 24–27, 21–21
Replay	Pts: Mayan Kiir 22; Rebs: Leon Hampton 11; Asts: Padiet Wang 13; PIR: Mayan Kiir 21	Boxscore	Pts: Billy Preston 23; Rebs: Billy Preston 14; Asts: Myck Kabongo 6 PIR: Billy Preston 36	Arena: Hassan Moustafa Sports Hall; Attendance: 208; Referees: Omar Bermudez, Babacar Gueye, Monicca Nassuuna

18 April 2022 5	FAP (Cameroon)	71–64	(South Sudan) Cobra Sport	Cairo
22:00	Scoring by quarter: 24–13, 22–10, 7–18, 18–23
Replay	Pts: Deshaun Morman 16; Rebs: Brice Eyaga Bidias, Tyjhai Byers 8 Asts: Deshaun Morman 7 PIR: Deshaun Morman, Joel Almeida 12	Boxscore	Pts: Mayan Kiir 22; Rebs: Nyang Wek 10; Asts: Padiet Wang 7 PIR: Mayan Kiir 19	Arena: Hassan Moustafa Sports Hall; Attendance: 452; Referees: Paul Tuomey, Jean Sauveur Ruhamiriza, Dorothy Okatch
