= 2022 BAL Nile Conference =

The Nile Conference of the 2022 BAL season began on 9 April 2022 and ended on 19 April 2022. In a group of six teams, all teams played each other one time. The top four teams in the standings advanced to the 2022 BAL Playoffs.

All games were hosted in the Hassan Moustafa Sports Hall in Cairo, Egypt. The teams and schedule were revealed on 8 February.

== Standings ==
Pos	Team	Pld	W	L	PF	PA	PD	PCT	Qualification	ZAM	PDL	CTT	FAP	CBS	ESF
1	(Egypt) Zamalek (H)	5	5	0	444	367	+77	1.000	Advance to playoffs	—	85–72	—	77–63	80–63	—
2	(Angola) Petro de Luanda	5	4	1	421	326	+95	.800	Advance to playoffs	—	—	—	73–60	92–56	94–64
3	(South Africa) Cape Town Tigers	5	2	3	386	436	−50	.400 (Note: Head-to-head: Cape Town Tigers 73–70 FAP on 13 April 2022.)	Advance to playoffs	77–101	61–90	—	—	—	—
4	(Cameroon) FAP	5	2	3	341	347	−6	.400	Advance to playoffs	—	—	70–73	—	71–64	77–60
5	(South Sudan) Cobra Sport	5	1	4	370	408	−38	.200 (Note: Head-to-head: Cobra Sport 108–82 Espoir Fukash on 13 April 2022.)		—	—	79–83	—	—	108–82
6	(Democratic Republic of the Congo) Espoir Fukash	5	1	4	394	472	−78	.200		92–101	—	96–92	—	—	—

Source: BAL, Afrobasket
(H) Hosts

== Games ==
All times are in Egypt Standard Time (GMT+2).

=== 9 April ===
9 April 2022	Zamalek (Egypt)	80–63	(South Sudan) Cobra Sport	Cairo
20:00	Scoring by quarter: 21–11, 14–17, 27–17, 18–18
Replay	Pts: Ike Diogu 17; Rebs: Anas Mahmoud 11; Asts: Édgar Sosa 8 PIR: Anas Mahmoud 29	Boxscore	Pts: Mayan Kiir 18; Rebs: Mayan Kiir 22; Asts: Padiet Wang 4 PIR: Mayan Kiir 23	Arena: Hassan Moustafa Sports Hall; Attendance: 230; Referees: Julian McFadden, Yann Vezo Davidson, Dorothy Okatch

=== 10 April ===
10 April 2022	FAP (Cameroon)	77–60	(Democratic Republic of the Congo) Espoir Fukash	Cairo
18:30	Scoring by quarter: 18–24, 22–17, 22–7, 15–12
Replay	Pts: Joel Almeida 23; Rebs: Tyjhai Byers 8 Asts: Cedric Kenfack, Brice Bidias, Deshaun Morman 2 PIR: Brice Bidias 17	Boxscore	Pts: Bobo Kabongo Kasasa 14; Rebs: Chris Mpaka Laza 11; Asts: Narcisse Ambanza 4 PIR: Rolly Fula Nganga 19	Arena: Hassan Moustafa Sports Hall; Attendance: 100; Referees: Hortensia Sanchez-Carrizales, Kingsley Ojeaburu, Mbaye Seye

10 April 2022	Cape Town Tigers (South Africa)	61–90	(Angola) Petro de Luanda	Cairo
22:00	Scoring by quarter: 18–23, 15–21, 15–21, 13–25
Replay	Pts: Evans Ganapamo 17; Rebs: Nkosinathi Sibanyoni 10; Asts: Myck Kabongo 9 PIR: Nkosinathi Sibanyoni 16	Boxscore	Pts: Carlos Morais 23; Rebs: Jone Pedro 15; Asts: Olímpio Cipriano 5 PIR: Carlos Morais 21	Arena: Hassan Moustafa Sports Hall; Attendance: 100; Referees: Paul Tuomey, Babacar Gueye, Jean Sauveur Ruhamiriza

=== 12 April ===
12 April 2022	Petro de Luanda (Angola)	92–56	(South Sudan) Cobra Sport	Cairo
18:30	Scoring by quarter: 37–13, 16–16, 24–11, 15–16
Replay	Pts: Aboubakar Gakou 17; Rebs: Aboubakar Gakou 8 Asts: Carlos Morais 6 PIR: Aboubakar Gakou 22	Boxscore	Pts: Padiet Wang 15; Rebs: Mayan Kiir, Khaman Maluach 6 Asts: Padiet Wang 3 PIR: Padiet Wang 13	Arena: Hassan Moustafa Sports Hall; Attendance: 250; Referees: Omar Bermudez, Amir Taboubi, Monicca Nassuuna

12 April 2022	Cape Town Tigers (South Africa)	77–101	(Egypt) Zamalek	Cairo
22:00	Scoring by quarter: 21–25, 19–11, 16–31, 21–34
Replay	Pts: Billy Preston 26; Rebs: Nkosinathi Sibanyoni 10; Asts: Myck Kabongo 3 PIR: Billy Preston 22	Boxscore	Pts: Édgar Sosa 25; Rebs: Anas Mahmoud 11; Asts: Anas Mahmoud, D. J. Strawberry 5 PIR: Anas Mahmoud 29	Arena: Hassan Moustafa Sports Hall; Attendance: 250; Referees: Stephanie Barksdale, Mbaye Seye, Yann Vezo Davidson

=== 13 April ===
13 April 2022	Cobra Sport (South Sudan)	108–82	(Democratic Republic of the Congo) Espoir Fukash	Cairo
18:30	Scoring by quarter: 28–17, 30–21, 27–23, 23–21
Replay	Pts: Mayan Kiir, Padiet Wang 24; Rebs: Mayan Kiir 11; Asts: Padiet Wang 8 PIR: Mayan Kiir 29	Boxscore	Pts: Rolly Fula Nganga 14; Rebs: Emmanuel Okorafor 10; Asts: Arsène Mwamba, Emmanuel Isungu 3 PIR: Emmanuel Okarafor 17	Arena: Hassan Moustafa Sports Hall; Attendance: 100; Referees: Julian McFadden, Dorothy Okatch, Mahamadou Diallo

13 April 2022	FAP (Cameroon)	70–73	(South Africa) Cape Town Tigers	Cairo
22:00	Scoring by quarter: 10–17, 24–10, 10–14, 26–32
Replay	Pts: Cédric Kenfack 16; Rebs: Brice Bidias, Joel Almeida 7 Asts: Cedric Kenfack, Pierre Essome 3 PIR: Cedric Kenfack, Tyjhai Byers 13	Boxscore	Pts: Evans Ganapamo 24; Rebs: Nkosinathi Sibanyoni 9 Asts: Myck Kabongo 12; PIR: Evans Ganapamo 25	Arena: Hassan Moustafa Sports Hall; Attendance: 100; Referees: Hortensia Sanchez-Carrizales, Kingsley Ojeaburu, Jean Sauveur Ruhamiriza

=== 15 April ===
15 April 2022	Cobra Sport (South Sudan)	79–83	(South Africa) Cape Town Tigers	Cairo
18:30	Scoring by quarter: 18–22, 16–13, 24–27, 21–21
Replay	Pts: Mayan Kiir 22; Rebs: Leon Hampton 11; Asts: Padiet Wang 13; PIR: Mayan Kiir 21	Boxscore	Pts: Billy Preston 23; Rebs: Billy Preston 14; Asts: Myck Kabongo 6 PIR: Billy Preston 36	Arena: Hassan Moustafa Sports Hall; Attendance: 208; Referees: Omar Bermudez, Babacar Gueye, Monicca Nassuuna

15 April 2022	Zamalek (Egypt)	85–72	(Angola) Petro de Luanda	Cairo
22:00	Scoring by quarter: 20–23, 25–19, 17–14, 23–16
Replay	Pts: Édgar Sosa 19; Rebs: Anas Mahmoud 11; Asts: D. J. Strawberry 6 PIR: Anas Mahmoud 26	Boxscore	Pts: Childe Dundão 16; Rebs: Jone Pedro, Aboubakar Gakou 8 Asts: Gerson Gonçalves 5 PIR: Childe Dundão, Jone Pedro 14	Arena: Hassan Moustafa Sports Hall; Attendance: 1,132; Referees: Stephanie Barksdale, Mbaye Seye, Amir Taboubi

=== 16 April ===
16 April 2022	Petro de Luanda (Angola)	73–60	(Cameroon) FAP	Cairo
18:30	Scoring by quarter: 18–10, 16–15, 20–15, 19–20
Replay	Pts: Childe Dundão 16; Rebs: Aboubakar Gakou 9 Asts: Gerson Gonçalves 8 PIR: Yanick Moreira 17	Boxscore	Pts: Joel Almeida 13; Rebs: Tyjhai Byers 8 Asts: Cyrille Keumoe 3 PIR: Joel Almeida 12	Arena: Hassan Moustafa Sports Hall; Attendance: 105; Referees: Paul Tuomey, Mbaye Seye, Yann Vezo Davidson

16 April 2022	Espoir Fukash (Democratic Republic of the Congo)	92–101	(Egypt) Zamalek	Cairo
22:00	Scoring by quarter: 11–26, 28–20, 22–36, 31–19
Replay	Pts: Rolly Fula Nganga 28; Rebs: Emmanuel Okorafor 12; Asts: Arsène Mwamba 6 PIR: Emmanuel Okorafor 21	Boxscore	Pts: Mikh McKinney 28; Rebs: Mostafa Kejo 10; Asts: Mikh McKinney 7 PIR: Mikh McKinney 29	Arena: Hassan Moustafa Sports Hall; Attendance: 259; Referees: Julian Mcfadden, Amir Taboubi, Mahamadou Diallo

=== 18 April ===
18 April 2022	Petro de Luanda (Angola)	94–64	(Democratic Republic of the Congo) Espoir Fukash	Cairo
18:30	Scoring by quarter: 25–16, 25–15, 22–13, 22–20
Replay	Pts: Yanick Moreira 17; Rebs: Valdelicio Joaquim 6 Asts: Childe Dundão 8 PIR: Yanick Moreira 21	Boxscore	Pts: Narcisse Ambanza 12; Rebs: Narcisse Ambanza 11; Asts: Arsène Mwamba, Emmanuel Isungu 4 PIR: Narcisse Ambanza 17	Arena: Hassan Moustafa Sports Hall; Attendance: 49; Referees: Hortensia Sanchez-Carrizales, Mbaye Seye, Monicca Nassuuna

18 April 2022	FAP (Cameroon)	71–64	(South Sudan) Cobra Sport	Cairo
22:00	Scoring by quarter: 24–13, 22–10, 7–18, 18–23
Replay	Pts: Deshaun Morman 16; Rebs: Brice Eyaga Bidias, Tyjhai Byers 8 Asts: Deshaun Morman 7 PIR: Deshaun Morman, Joel Almeida 12	Boxscore	Pts: Mayan Kiir 22; Rebs: Nyang Wek 10; Asts: Padiet Wang 7 PIR: Mayan Kiir 19	Arena: Hassan Moustafa Sports Hall; Attendance: 452; Referees: Paul Tuomey, Jean Sauveur Ruhamiriza, Dorothy Okatch

=== 19 April ===
19 April 2022	Espoir Fukash (Democratic Republic of the Congo)	96–92(OT)	(South Africa) Cape Town Tigers	Cairo
18:30	Scoring by quarter: 17–29, 17–19, 27–25, 26–14, Overtime: 9–5
Replay	Pts: Rolly Fula Nganga 29; Rebs: Emmanuel Okorafor 15; Asts: Narcisse Ambanza 9 PIR: Rolly Fula Nganga 32	Boxscore	Pts: Billy Preston 25; Rebs: Pieter Prinsloo 11; Asts: Billy Preston 6 PIR: Billy Preston 32	Arena: Hassan Moustafa Sports Hall; Attendance: 142; Referees: Stephanie Barksdale, Babacar Gueye, Mahamadou Diallo

19 April 2022	Zamalek (Egypt)	77–63	(Cameroon) FAP	Cairo
22:00	Scoring by quarter: 11–12, 24–21, 19–13, 23–17
Replay	Pts: Édgar Sosa 27; Rebs: Ike Diogu 11; Asts: Mikh McKinney, Anas Mahmoud 5 PIR: Anas Mahmoud 29	Boxscore	Pts: Brice Eyaga Bidias 17; Rebs: Cedric Kenfack 9 Asts: Cyrille Keumoe 4 PIR: Brice Eyaga Bidias 19	Arena: Hassan Moustafa Sports Hall; Attendance: 865; Referees: Omar Bermudez, Kingsley Ojeaburu, Yann Vezo Davidson
