= List of Basketball Africa League annual statistical leaders =

The following is a overview of all annual statistical leaders in a given season of the Basketball Africa League (BAL).

== Key ==
^		Denotes player who is still active in the BAL			
*		Inducted into the Naismith Memorial Basketball Hall of Fame			
†		Denotes player who won the Most Valuable Player award that year			
Player (X)		Denotes the number of times the player had been the scoring leader up to and including that season			
G	Guard	F	Forward	C	Center

== Scoring leaders ==
Season	Player	Pos.	Nationality	Team	Games played	Field goals made	3-point field goals made	Free throws made	Total points	Points per game	References
2021	Terrell Stoglin^	G	United States	(Morocco) AS Salé	4	38	9	38	123	30.1	
2022	Terrell Stoglin (2)^	G	United States	(Morocco) AS Salé	6	58	23	46	185	30.8	
2023	Falando Jones	G	United States	(Uganda) City Oilers	5	36	13	23	108	21.6	
2024	Jo Lual-Acuil	C	South Sudan	(Libya) Al Ahly Ly	10	91	0	29	211	21.1	
2025	Teafale Lenard (Note: While Teafale Lenard led the league in scoring with 22.7 points per game while only playing in the group phase, the Top Scorer award was given to Jean Jacques Boissy, who averaged 18.9 points per game but also played in the playoffs.)	F	United States	(South Africa) MBB	6	42	12	40	136	22.7	

== Rebounding leaders ==
Season	Player	Pos.	Nationality	Team	Games played	Offensive rebounds	Defensive rebounds	Total rebounds	Rebounds per game	References
2021	Ibrahima Thomas	C	Senegal	(Mali) AS Police	3	13	23	36	12.0	
2022	Mayan Kiir	C	South Sudan	(South Sudan) Cobra Sport	5	15	41	56	11.4	
2023	Aliou Diarra	C	Mali	(Mali) Stade Malien	8	41	51	92	13.4	
2024	Khaman Maluach	C	South Sudan	(Uganda) City Oilers	6	30	51	81	13.5	
2025	Assem Marei	C	Egypt	(Libya) Al Ahli Tripoli	10				12.6	

== Assists leaders ==
Season	Player	Pos.	Nationality	Team	Games played	Total assists	Assists per game	References
2021	Myck Kabongo	G	DR Congo	(Mozambique) Ferroviário de Maputo	4	27	6.8	
2022	Hameed Ali	G	United States	(Senegal) DUC	5	42	8.4	
2023	Cleveland Thomas	G	United States	(Rwanda) REG	6	39	6.7	
2024	Chris Crawford	G	United States	(Tunisia) US Monastir	8	72	9.0	
2025	Cameron Parker	G	United States	(Cape Verde) Kriol Star				

== Steals leaders ==
Season	Player	Pos.	Nationality	Team	Games played	Total steals	Steals per game	References
2021	Bara Diop^	F	Senegal	(Senegal) AS Douanes	4	10	2.5	
2022	Childe Dundão^	G	Angola	(Angola) Petro de Luannda	5	42	3.0	
2023	Dane Miller Jr.	F	United States	(Guinea) SLAC	5	17	3.2	
2024	Abdoulaye Harouna	G	Niger	(Senegal) AS Douanes	8	32	4.0	
2025	Teafale Lenard	G	United States					

== Blocks leaders ==
Season	Player	Pos.	Nationality	Team	Games played	Total blocks	Blocks per game	References
2021	Anas Mahmoud	C	Egypt	(Egypt) Zamalek	6	17	3.2	
2022	Chris Obekpa^	C	Nigeria	(Guinea) SLAC	5	42	4.6	
2023	Aliou Diarra	C	Mali	(Mali) Stade Malien	8	19	2.3	
2024	Abdou Ndoye	C	Senegal	(South Africa) Cape Town Tigers	8	14	3.5	
2025	Aliou Diarra (2)^	C	Mali	(South Africa) Cape Town Tigers	8		3.3	

== Field goal percentage ==
Season	Player	Pos.	Nationality	Team	Games played	FGA	FGM	FG%	References
2021	Mohab Yasser	G	Egypt	(Egypt) Zamalek	6	33	23	69.7%	
2022	Mohamed Keita	C	Guinea	(Guinea) SLAC	6	20	15	75.0%	
2022	Soufiane Kourdou	F	Morocco	(Morocco) AS Salé	6	16	12	75.0%	
2023	Dane Miller Jr.	F	United States	(Guinea) SLAC	5	72	40	55.6%	
2024	Aliou Diarra	C	Mali	(Morocco) FUS Rabat	6	40	60	66.7%	
2025	Aliou Diarra (2)	C	Mali	(Rwanda) APR				55.7%	

== Three-point field goals made ==
Season	Player	Pos.	Nationality	Team	Games played	3PT made	References
2021	Chris Crawford^	G	United States	(Tunisia) US Monastir	6	16	
2022	Édgar Sosa	G	Dominican Republic	(Egypt) Zamalek	8	27	
2023	Carlos Morais	F	Angola	(Angola) Petro de Luannda	8	26	
2024	Will Perry	G	United States	(Nigeria) Rivers Hoopers	10	27	
2024	Kelvin Amayo	G	Nigeria	(Nigeria) Rivers Hoopers	9	27	
2025	Jean Jacques Boissy	G	Angola	(Angola) Petro de Luannda	10	37	

== Three-point field goal percentage ==
Season	Player	Pos.	Nationality	Team	Games played	Attempted	Made	3P%	References
2021	Solo Diabate^	G	Ivory Coast	(Egypt) Zamalek	6	33	13	59.1%	
2022	Michael Dixon	G	Georgia	(Tunisia) US Monastir	8	38	18	47.4%	
2023	Corey Webster	G	New Zealand	(Egypt) Al Ahly	8	35	15	45.7%	
2024	Billy Preston	F	United States	(South Africa) Cape Town Tigers	4	7	14	50.0%	
2025	Madut Akec	F	South Sudan	(Nigeria) Rivers Hoopers				48.8%	
