= BAL Ubuntu Award =

African basketball award

The Basketball Africa League Ubuntu Award is an annual Basketball Africa League (BAL) award that recognises a player who participated in the BAL and who best represents the league through his efforts in the community. The name "Ubuntu" is taken from the word in the Nguni and Bantu languages, symbolizes essential human virtues, such as compassion, respect and humanity. Along with giving out the individual award, the BAL donates to a social organisation of choice by the winning player. The donation was originally $5,000, and was increased to $10,000 from the 2026 season, when Qatar Foundation became the trophy's presenting partner.

== Winners ==
Season	Player	Nationality	Club	Merit	Nominees	Ref
2021	Hicham Benayad-Cherif	Algeria	(Algeria) GS Pétroliers	Benayad-Cherif founded the Elite Student Athlete Academy in Algeria, where he has developed basketball camps and training programs for 800 children since 2018.	—N/a	
2022	Jean Jacques Nshobozwabyosenumukiza	Rwanda	(Rwanda) REG	At Club Rafiki, Jean Jacques helped children and young adults to integrate into society through developmental basketball programming and competitions.	Gerson Gonçalves; Brice Eyaga Bidias	
2023	Tonny Drileba	Uganda	(Uganda) City Oilers	As an assistant coach for Angels Basketball Club – a professional women’s team that competes in the Ugandan Basketball League – Drileba participated in the club’s community outreach projects across the country, including youth clinics and life-skills seminars at Nakivale Refugee Camp in Western Uganda.	Stéphane Konaté; Ehab Amin; Ibrahima Kalil Fofana	
2024	Alkaly Ndour	Senegal	(Senegal) AS Douanes	Ndour is recognized for founding a basketball tournament in his Dakar neighborhood of Bopp, involving nearly 250 amateur players. He also conducts youth basketball camps and supports the unemployed, promoting community engagement and peace.	–	
2025	Joel Almeida	Cape Verde	(Cape Verde) Kriol Star	Almeida organised basketball camps and clinics that reached more than 100 aspiring players and coaches over the past year, including from underserved communities in his native Cape Verde.	–	
2026	Ariel Okall Koranga	Kenya	(Kenya) Nairobi City Thunder	Okall Koranga founded and leads a women’s basketball initiative in Kenya that combines high-level training with mentorship, life-skills and mental-health support, reaching more than 300 players from diverse backgrounds, including participants from the deaf basketball community.	Joshua Ozabor; Ibrahim Famouke Doumbia; Hasheem Thabeet	
