= Terrell Stoglin =

American basketball player (born 1991)

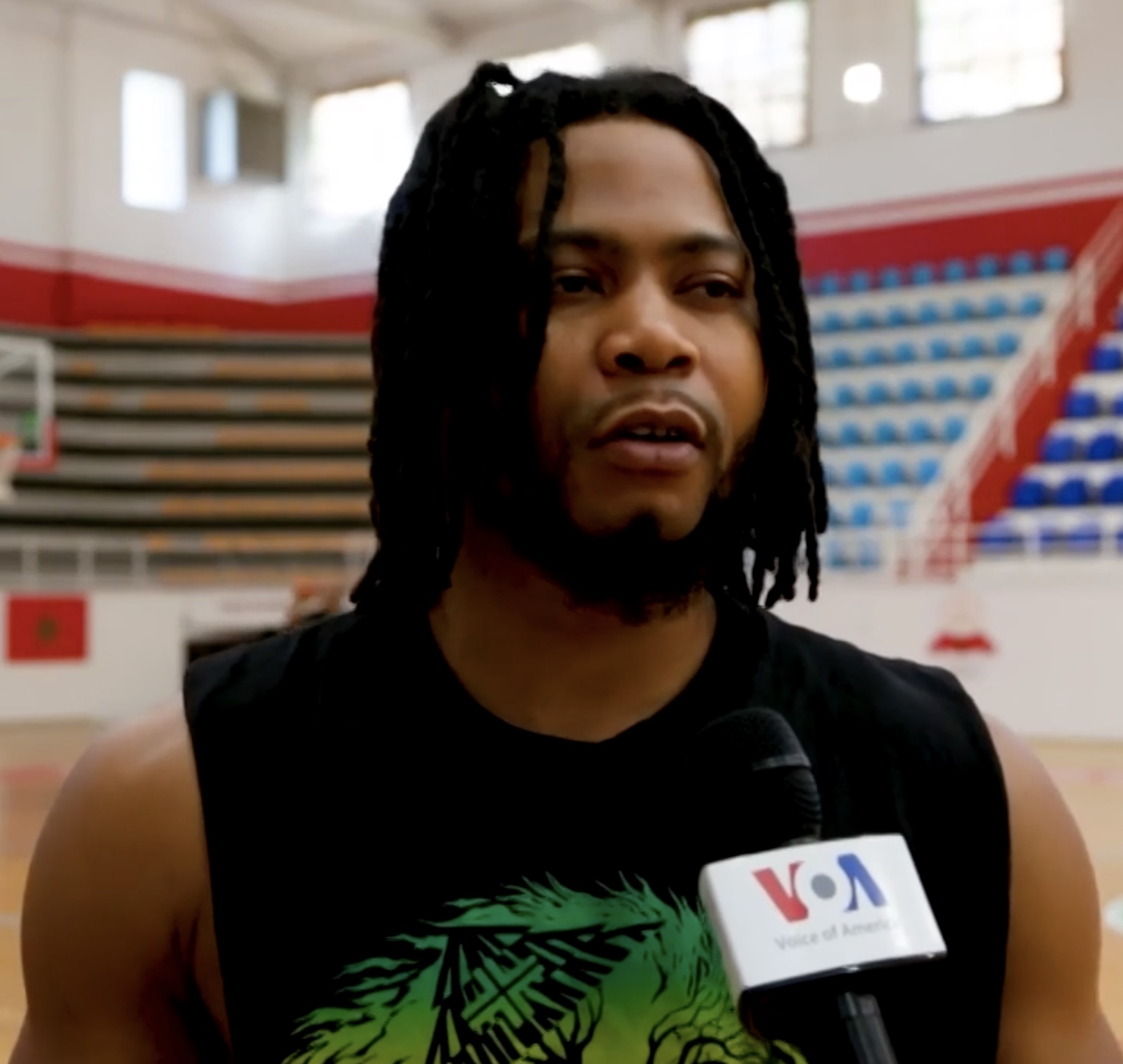
- Stoglin during an interview in 2022

Personal information
- Born: November 10, 1991 (age 35) Tucson, Arizona, U.S.
- Listed height: 6 ft 1 in (1.85 m)
- Listed weight: 185 lb (84 kg)

Career information
- High school: Santa Rita (Tucson, Arizona)
- College: Maryland (2010–2012)
- NBA draft: 2012: undrafted
- Playing career: 2012–present
- Position: Point guard / shooting guard

Career history
- 2012–2013: Ilysiakos
- 2013–2014: Cholet
- 2014: Azovmash Mariupol
- 2014: Stelmet Zielona Góra
- 2014: Pallacanestro Varese
- 2014–2015: Club Sagesse
- 2015–2016: Adanaspor
- 2016–2017: Club Sagesse
- 2017: Hunan Yongsheng
- 2018: Al Rayyan
- 2018: Manama Bahrain
- 2018: Trotamundos de Carabobo
- 2018–2019: Zamalek
- 2020–2021: Al-Ahli Jeddah
- 2021: AS Salé
- 2021: Al-Shorta
- 2022: AS Salé
- 2022: Al-Nasr Benghazi
- 2022–2023: Al-Ittihad Aleppo
- 2023: AS Douanes
- 2024–2025: Al Shamal
- 2025–present: Al Ittihad Tripoli

Career highlights
- All-BAL First Team (2022); 2× BAL scoring champion (2021, 2022); Moroccan League champion (2021); Egyptian Super League champion (2019); Egyptian League MVP (2019); Second-team All-ACC (2012); ACC All-Freshman team (2011)

Terrell DeVon Stoglin (born November 10, 1991) is an American professional basketball player. He served as the starting shooting guard for the University of Maryland, where he played college basketball for two seasons.

== Early life ==
Stoglin was born and raised in Tucson, Arizona. The hometown team being the Arizona Wildcats, he did not have much exposure to the Maryland basketball program while growing up. He said, "The only thing I knew about Maryland was that Steve Francis went there." The Washington Post described him as the city's best eighth-grade basketball player. Stoglin attended Santa Rita High School in Tucson, where he earned a spot on the varsity basketball team as a freshman. His high school coach, Jim Ferguson, described Stoglin as confident without being arrogant. During his sophomore year, he scored 35 points during a tournament against DeMar DeRozan. As a junior, he recorded an average 27 points, seven assists, and two steals per game. During his senior year, he compiled an average of 29.4 points, 6.4 assists, and 2.6 steals per game. Stoglin helped lead Santa Rita to a 4-A state championship, and The Arizona Republic named him to its All-Arizona team.

Stoglin received scholarship offers from Maryland, Texas A&M, Penn State, and San Diego, while he also received interest from Arizona, Arizona State, California, Georgetown, Loyola Marymount, UCLA, Georgia Tech, and Southern California. He chose the University of Maryland because of its great sports tradition.

== College career ==
As a college prospect, Stoglin garnered early interest from the staff of Maryland coach Gary Williams. Assistant coach Rob Ehsan first observed Stoglin during the summer of 2008 at the Nike Hoop Jamboree in St. Louis, Missouri. Maryland's recruitment progressed throughout the following year. Stoglin declined to wait for the University of Arizona to hire its next basketball coach, and committed to attend Maryland in April 2009. He said, "I was weighing my options, and as a matter of fact, I was going to wait until the summer [to commit] ... my family sat down at the dinner table and discussed it. I like the D.C. area, and I like the climate. I like the way Coach Williams coaches and I like the program overall. Maryland has a great guard history and I just thought I'd pull the trigger." Williams said he expected Stoglin to contribute immediately as a freshman.

=== 2010–11 season ===
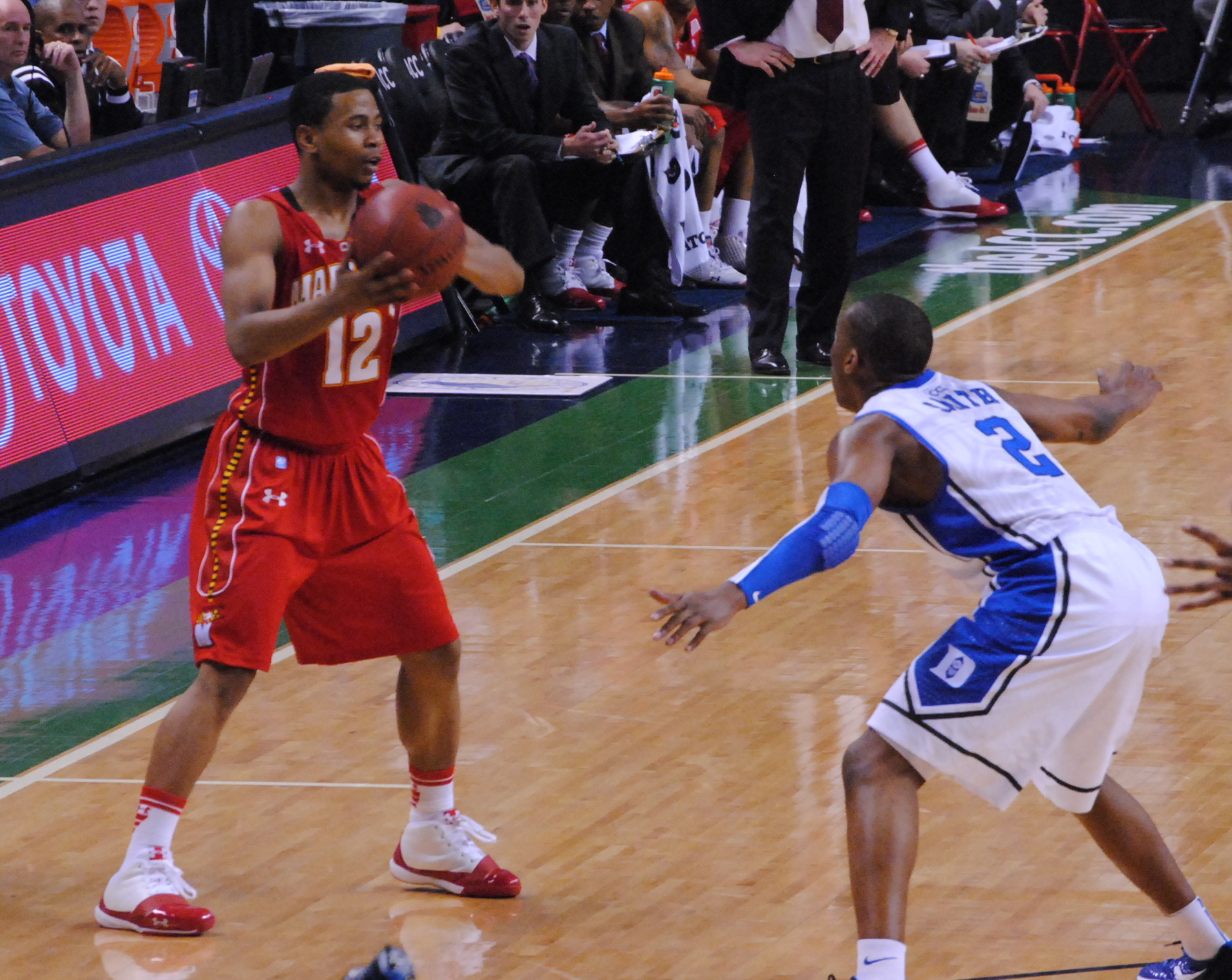
Stoglin defended by Duke's Nolan Smith

During the 2010–11 season, Stoglin averaged 11.6 points per game, including at least 20 points in each of Maryland's last four games. Against Temple, Stoglin came off the bench with 16 points, 12 of which came in the second half, sparking a comeback from a 15-point halftime deficit that fell just short in the 64–61 loss. His first collegiate start came against Colgate, where he scored 12 points on 4–8 shooting.

Late in the season, Stoglin emerged as a prolific scorer. In Maryland's 91–83 loss at Virginia Tech, Stoglin tallied 25 points, including 10–10 from the free-throw line, and six assists in 28 minutes of playing time. In the 87–80 victory over NC State, he recorded 25 points, 8–14 from the floor and 9–10 from the free-throw line, and a team season high of nine assists. For his effort in those two games, Stoglin was named the ACC Rookie of the Week. After the game, head coach Gary Williams compared him to the previous season's senior point guard and Bob Cousy Award winner, Greivis Vasquez: "It's the great competitor that thinks he can score against anybody." The Washington Post noted that Stoglin "put the offense on his shoulders in the second half."

Stoglin repeated the feat by earning a second consecutive ACC Rookie of the Week recognition after his performance against Florida State and No. 19 North Carolina. In the 87–76 loss to North Carolina, he recorded a season-high 28 points on 11–20 shooting. It was the most points for a Maryland freshman in a single game since Joe Smith scored 29 points against Saint Louis in the 1994 NCAA tournament. In the 78–62 win against Florida State, he tallied 17 points and five assists. The Atlantic Coast Sports Media Association named him to the ACC All-Freshman Team.

=== 2011–12 season ===
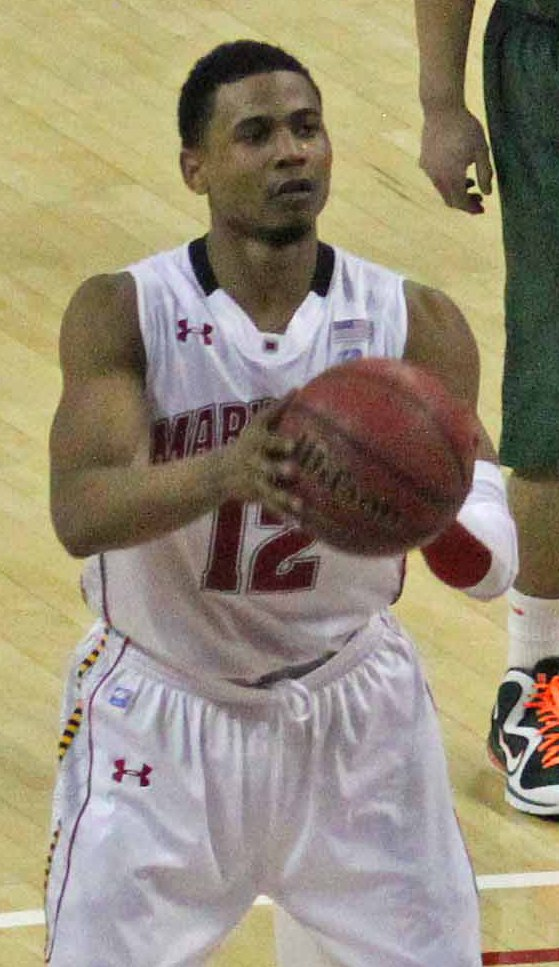
Stoglin with Maryland in 2012

Stoglin emerged as one of the nation's most prolific scorers in the 2011–12 season. While not a complete surprise, his scoring, almost double the next highest scorer on the Terps' roster, has been a welcome asset to a rebuilding Maryland Terrapins squad. On February 11, 2012, Stoglin posted derogatory comments about Terps head coach Mark Turgeon, following a game against the Duke Blue Devils in which Stoglin missed 10 of 14 shots, including all six three-point shots attempted. During the game, Turgeon removed Stoglin from the lineup in light of his poor shooting performance and disruption of the game's tempo.

On April 30, 2012, the University of Maryland announced that Stoglin was suspended from the school for a year due to a violation of student-athlete code of conduct. Stoglin declared for the 2012 NBA draft and went undrafted.

== Professional career ==
=== 2012–13 season ===
In November 2012, Stoglin signed a one-year deal with the Greek Basket League club Ilysiakos.

=== 2013–14 season ===
On July 22, 2013, Stoglin signed with Cholet Basket of France. On January 23, 2014, he was released by Cholet. Seven days later, he signed with Azovmash Mariupol of Ukraine. On March 3, 2014, he parted ways with Azovmash. Two days later, he signed with Stelmet Zielona Góra of Poland. The next month, he left Zielona Gora and signed with Pallacanestro Varese of Italy for the rest of the 2013–14 Lega Basket Serie A season.

=== 2014–15 season ===
On October 6, 2014, Stoglin signed with Club Sagesse of the Lebanese Basketball League. On January 30, 2015, he scored 74 points for Sagesse in a game against Champville. On April 15, 2015, he parted ways with Sagesse.

=== 2015–16 season ===
In July 2015, he signed with Adanaspor of the Turkish Basketball First League. On February 7, 2016, he left Adanaspor and returned to his former club Sagesse.

=== 2017–18 season ===
On February 1, 2018, Stoglin signed with Al Rayyan Doha of the Qatari Basketball League. He spent much of the 2018 season with Trotamundos de Carabobo of the Venezuelan LPB, averaging 22.1 points and 4.3 assists per game. In game 7 of the LPB Grand Final, after being ejected, Stoglin kicked the ball into the stands, removed his jersey, and made a middle finger gesture to the crowd before exiting the court.

=== 2018–19 season ===
On September 11, 2018, Stoglin signed with Zamalek of the Egyptian Basketball Super League. He won the 2018–19 Super League title with Zamalek and was named the league's MVP.

=== 2019–20 season ===
In February 2020, Stoglin signed in Morocco with AS Salé, member of the Division Excellence and the Basketball Africa League (BAL).

=== 2020–21 season ===
On November 18, 2020, he signed with Al-Ahli Jeddah of the Saudi Premier League.

In May 2021, Stoglin returned to AS Salé to play in the 2021 BAL season. On May 21, Stoglin became the first player ever to score 40 points in a BAL game after helping Salé defeat AS Police. He averaged a league-high 30.1 points and was given the Scoring Champion Award. On July 27, 2021, Stoglin won the Division Excellence championship with Salé.

=== 2021–22 season ===
On September 26, he signed with Al-Shorta of the Iraqi Basketball League.

In March 2022, Stoglin returned to AS Salé for a third stint to join the team for the 2022 BAL season. On March 11, Stoglin scored 41 points in a loss against US Monastir, breaking his own league record for most points in a BAL game. He guided Salé to the quarterfinals and was named to the All-BAL First Team for the first time; he also led the league in scoring for a second consecutive season with 30.8 points per game.

=== 2022–23 season ===
On June 29, 2022, Stoglin was announced to have signed with Al-Nasr Benghazi of the Libyan Division I Basketball League. On October 25, 2022, he joined Al-Ittihad Aleppo of the Syrian Basketball League, although it was reported earlier that he had a contract in place with Al Ahli Tripoli in Libya.

In January 2023, Stoglin signed with Senegalese champions AS Douanes with whom he played in his third consecutive BAL season. After the regular season, Stoglin was released by the club after appearing in two games.

=== 2023–24 season ===
In the 2023–24 season, Stoglin played in Libya with Al Ahli Tripoli again.

=== 2024–25 season ===
Stoglin began the season with Al-Shamal SC in the Qatari Basketball League (QBL). On April 13, 2025, Stoglin signed with Al Ittihad Tripoli in Libya.

== Statistics ==
=== College statistics ===
Legend
| GP | Games played | GS | Games started | MPG | Minutes per game |
| FG% | Field goal percentage | 3P% | 3-point field goal percentage | FT% | Free throw percentage |
| RPG | Rebounds per game | APG | Assists per game | SPG | Steals per game |
| BPG | Blocks per game | PPG | Points per game | **Bold** | Career high |
| * | Led the league |

| Year | Team | GP | GS | MPG | FG% | 3P% | FT% | RPG | APG | SPG | BPG | PPG |
|---|---|---|---|---|---|---|---|---|---|---|---|---|
| 2010–11 | Maryland | 33 | 15 | 21.5 | .460 | .359 | .827 | 1.3 | 3.3 | 0.8 | 0.1 | 11.4 |
| 2011–12 | Maryland | 32 | 30 | 32.7 | .413 | .384 | .787 | 3.4 | 1.9 | 0.7 | 0.1 | 21.6 |
| Career | | 65 | 45 | 27.0 | .429 | .377 | .800 | 2.4 | 2.6 | 0.7 | 0.1 | 16.4 |

=== BAL statistics ===
| Year | Team | GP | GS | MPG | FG% | 3P% | FT% | RPG | APG | SPG | BPG | PPG |
|---|---|---|---|---|---|---|---|---|---|---|---|---|
| 2021 | AS Salé | 4 | 4 | **33.8** | .447 | .243 | **.884** | **4.3** | 2.0 | **1.5** | .0 | 30.1* |
| 2022 | AS Salé | **6** | **6** | 30.8 | **.472** | **.411** | .807 | 3.0 | **4.8** | 0.5 | .0 | **30.8*** |
| 2023 | AS Douanes | 2 | 2 | 28.9 | .280 | .100 | .600 | 1.5 | 3.0 | 1.0 | .0 | 10.5 |
