= Basket Hounds =

- League: BUZ National Championship; HBA; MBA
- Founded: 2022
- History: Basket Hounds (2022–present )
- Location: Harare, Zimbabwe
- Head coach: Tawanda Nemutambwe
- Ownership: Vitalis Chikoko/ Tawanda Nemutambwe
- Championships: 8 (2024, 2025)

-National Champions 2024&2025 -Harare Super 6 Champions 2025 -Vixens Tournament champions 2024 -Byo Lakers Tournament 2022&2023 Champions -HBA Preseason Tournament Champions 2023 -Harare A League Champions 2023 -Played in The RoadToBAL 2024-25 & 2025–2026

Basket Hounds is a Zimbabwean basketball team based in Harare. The team plays in both the Harare Basketball Association (HBA), and the national BUZ National Championship. They have won two national championship.

== History ==
Basket Hounds was founded in 2022 by active professional player Vitalis Chikoko and coach Tawanda Nemutambwe. The long-term goal of the club was qualification for the Basketball Africa League (BAL), Africa's continental premier league.

The Hounds won their first national BUZ championship in 2024 under coach Nemutambwe, after downing the defending champions JBC in the final. As such, Hounds will make their debut in the Road to BAL, the continental qualifying rounds for the BAL. They became the third Zimbabwean team to play in the competition. The Hounds won another championship in 2025, after defeating Mbare Bulls in the final.
