= 2022 BAL qualification =

2022 BAL qualification (Road to BAL 2022)
- Association: FIBA Africa
- League: Road to BAL
- Sport: Basketball
- Duration: 19 October – 16 December 2021
- Games: 40
- Teams: 18

West Division
- Division champions: (Cameroon) FAP
- Top scorer: Rolly Fula Nganga (Espoir)

East Division
- Division champions: (Mozambique) Ferroviário da Beira
- Top scorer: Ismael Nurmamade (Ferroviário)

Seasons
- ← 2021 2023 →

The qualification tournaments for the 2022 BAL season, also known as the Road to BAL 2022, were the qualification rounds for the second season of the Basketball Africa League (BAL). The tournaments began on 19 October 2021 and ended 16 December 2021. Similar to the first season, the competition consisted out of two stages: the first round and the elite 16. Six teams advanced to the group phase of the BAL.

== Teams ==
On 13 October 2021, FIBA announced the 26 teams from 26 countries which participate in the qualification round.

- 1st, 2nd, etc.: ranking in national leagues
- CW: Cup winner

First round
| West Division | | East Division | |
|---|---|---|---|
| (Benin) ASPAC (1st) | (Ivory Coast) SOA (1st) | (Burundi) New Star (1st) | (Uganda) City Oilers (1st) |
| (Democratic Republic of the Congo) Espoir Fukash (1st) | (Guinea) SLAC (1st) | (Tanzania) Kurasini Heat (1st) | (South Sudan) Cobra Sport (1st) |
| (Mali) AS Police (1st) | (Central African Republic) Tondema (1st) | (Mauritius) Roche-Bois Warriors (1st) | (Zambia) Matero Magic (1st) |
| (Cameroon) FAP (1st) | (Niger) Nigelec | (Malawi) Brave Hearts (1st) | (South Africa) Cape Town Tigers (1st) |
| | | (Kenya) Ulinzi Warriors (1st) | (Mozambique) Ferroviário da Beira (1st) |

Notes

1. DR Congo (COD): In FIBA's team list of 13 October 2020 national champions ASB Mazembe was announced to be the Congolese representative. However, the Fédération de basketball du Congo (FEBACO) eventually decided to enter 2021 champions Espoir Fukash.
2. Zimbabwe (ZIM): The representative team from Zimbabwe, Mercenaries pulled out before its games in Group F started.

=== Withdrawing teams ===
Six teams were drawn in a group for the first round, but withdrew prior to the start of the games.

Group A
(Algeria) WA Boufarik

(Cape Verde) Prédio

Group B
(Burkina Faso) AOA
Group C

Group D
(Madagascar) ASCUT

(Ethiopia) Hawassa City

Group E

Group F
(Zimbabwe) Mercenaries

== First round ==
The first two teams of each group advance to the elite 16 and two wild cards were given to teams from each division.

=== West Division ===
==== Group A ====
Initially, four teams were drawn in Group A, which was played in Conakry, Guinea. However, Prédio and WA Boufarik failed to travel to Conakry.

| Pos | Team | Pld | W | L | PF | PA | PD | Pts | Qualification |
|---|---|---|---|---|---|---|---|---|---|
| 1 | (Mali) AS Police | 2 | 1 | 1 | 173 | 167 | +6 | 3 | Advance to Elite 16 |
| 2 | (Guinea) SLAC (H) | 2 | 1 | 1 | 167 | 173 | −6 | 3 | Advance to Elite 16 |
| 3 | (Cape Verde) Prédio (D) | 0 | 0 | 0 | 0 | 0 | 0 | 0 | Withdrew |
| 4 | (Algeria) WA Boufarik (D) | 0 | 0 | 0 | 0 | 0 | 0 | 0 | Withdrew |

Source: FIBA
(D) Disqualified; (H) Hosts

29 October 2021
| SLAC (Guinea) | 95–93 | (Mali) AS Police |
31 October 2021
| AS Police (Mali) | 80–72 | (Guinea) SLAC |

==== Group B ====
Venue: Conakry, Guinea

| Pos | Team | Pld | W | L | PF | PA | PD | Pts | Qualification |
|---|---|---|---|---|---|---|---|---|---|
| 1 | (Ivory Coast) SOA | 2 | 2 | 0 | 124 | 91 | +33 | 4 | Advance to Elite 16 |
| 2 | (Niger) Nigelec | 2 | 1 | 1 | 116 | 99 | +17 | 3 | Advance to Elite 16 |
| 3 | (Benin) ASPAC (W) | 2 | 0 | 2 | 75 | 125 | −50 | 2 | Advance to Elite 16 |
| 4 | (Burkina Faso) AOA (D) | 0 | 0 | 0 | 0 | 0 | 0 | 0 | Withdrew |

Source: FIBA
(D) Disqualified; (W) Advanced with wild card

29 October 2021
| SOA (Ivory Coast) | 64–51 | (Niger) Nigelec |
30 October 2021
| ASPAC (Benin) | 40–60 | (Ivory Coast) SOA |
31 October 2021
| Nigelec (Niger) | 65–35 | (Benin) ASPAC |

==== Group C ====
Group C was hosted in Yaoundé, Cameroon. FAP, who play in the 2021 regular season, returned while Tondema and Espoir Fukash made their debuts in the competition. Malabo Kings forfeited the last day.

| Pos | Team | Pld | W | L | PF | PA | PD | Pts | Qualification |
|---|---|---|---|---|---|---|---|---|---|
| 1 | (Cameroon) FAP (H) | 2 | 2 | 0 | 166 | 122 | +44 | 4 | Advance to Elite 16 |
| 2 | (Democratic Republic of the Congo) Espoir Fukash | 2 | 1 | 1 | 167 | 133 | +34 | 3 | Advance to Elite 16 |
| 3 | (Central African Republic) Tondema | 2 | 0 | 2 | 106 | 184 | −78 | 2 | |
| 4 | (Equatorial Guinea) Malabo Kings (D) | 0 | 0 | 0 | 0 | 0 | 0 | 0 | Forfeited |

Source: FIBA
(D) Disqualified; (H) Hosts

29 October 2021
| FAP (Cameroon) | 82–57 | (Central African Republic) Tondema |
30 October 2021
| Tondema (Central African Republic) | 49–102 | (Democratic Republic of the Congo) Espoir Fukash |
31 October 2021
| FAP (Cameroon) | 84–65 | (Democratic Republic of the Congo) Espoir Fukash |

=== East Division ===
Because Hawassa City and ASCUT of Group D withdrew, the groups were divided again. New Star was moved to Group D.

==== Group D ====
Venue: Dar es Salaam, Tanzania

| Pos | Team | Pld | W | L | PF | PA | PD | Pts | Qualification |
|---|---|---|---|---|---|---|---|---|---|
| 1 | (Burundi) New Star | 2 | 2 | 0 | 147 | 120 | +27 | 4 | Advance to Elite 16 |
| 2 | (Kenya) Ulinzi Warriors | 2 | 1 | 1 | 127 | 127 | 0 | 3 | Advance to Elite 16 |
| 3 | (South Sudan) Cobra Sport (W) | 2 | 0 | 2 | 93 | 120 | −27 | 2 | Advance to Elite 16 |
| 4 | (Ethiopia) Hawassa City (D) | 0 | 0 | 0 | 0 | 0 | 0 | 0 | Withdrew |
| 5 | (Madagascar) ASCUT (D) | 0 | 0 | 0 | 0 | 0 | 0 | 0 | Withdrew |

Source: FIBA
(D) Disqualified; (W) Advanced with wild card

29 October 2021
| New Star (Burundi) | 67–46 | (South Sudan) Cobra Sport |
30 October 2021
| Ulinzi Warriors (Kenya) | 72–80 | (Burundi) New Star |
31 October 2021
| Cobra Sport (South Sudan) | 47–53 | (Kenya) Ulinzi Warriors |

==== Group E ====
All times are GMT+3.

Venue: Dar es Salaam, Tanzania

| Pos | Team | Pld | W | L | PF | PA | PD | Pts | Qualification |
|---|---|---|---|---|---|---|---|---|---|
| 1 | (Uganda) City Oilers | 2 | 2 | 0 | 143 | 92 | +51 | 4 | Advance to Elite 16 |
| 2 | (Tanzania) Kurasini Heat (H) | 2 | 1 | 1 | 103 | 97 | +6 | 3 | Advance to Elite 16 |
| 3 | (Malawi) Brave Hearts | 2 | 0 | 2 | 70 | 127 | −57 | 2 | |

Updated to match(es) played on 30 October 2021. Source: FIBA
(H) Hosts

29 October 2021
20:00

Box score

| Brave Hearts (Malawi) | 27–54 | (Tanzania) Kurasini Heat |
Scoring by quarter: 7-13, 8-10, 4-14, 8-17
| Pts: Chizah 9 Rebs: Kadiwa 6 Asts: Limbe, Vernon 2 | | Pts: Lugora 16; Rebs: Basco 9 Asts: Musongole 5 |

Benjamin Mkapa Indoor Court, Dar es Salaam
Referees: Cherubin Leslie (MRI), Antonio Bernardo (ANG), Monicca Nassuuna (UGA)

29 October 2021
20:00

Box score

| City Oilers (Uganda) | 73–43 | (Malawi) Brave Hearts |
Scoring by quarter: 19-10, 16-14, 19-7, 19-12
| Pts: Balwigaire Jr. 14; Rebs: Okello 12; Asts: Three players 4 | | Pts: Mwambene 17; Rebs: Kadiwa, Mwambene 8 Asts: Nhira 3 |

Benjamin Mkapa Indoor Court, Dar es Salaam
Referees: Jean Sauveur Ruhamiriza (RWA), Shabani Mohamed Shabani (TUN), Erick Otieno (KEN)

29 October 2021
20:00

Box score

| Kurasini Heat (Tanzania) | 49–70 | (Uganda) City Oilers |
Scoring by quarter: 7-11, 17-19, 11-19, 14-21

Benjamin Mkapa Indoor Court, Dar es Salaam
Referees: Walelign Gebeto (ETH), Tonton Banza Kalume (DRC), Erick Otieno (KEN)

==== Group F ====
The venue of Group F was the Inzibio Hall in Soweto, Johannesburg, South Africa. Five teams were placed in this group, however, Mercenaries pulled out before the start. The Cape Town Tigers and Roche-Bois Warriors made their debut in the international level. The Group featured two former NBA players in Ben Uzoh and Billy Preston, who both played with Cape Town.

| Pos | Team | Pld | W | L | PF | PA | PD | Pts | Qualification |
|---|---|---|---|---|---|---|---|---|---|
| 1 | (South Africa) Cape Town Tigers (H) | 3 | 3 | 0 | 285 | 211 | +74 | 6 | Advance to Elite 16 |
| 2 | (Mozambique) Ferroviário da Beira | 3 | 2 | 1 | 298 | 173 | +125 | 5 | Advance to Elite 16 |
| 3 | (Zambia) Matero Magic (W) | 3 | 1 | 2 | 223 | 207 | +16 | 4 | Advance to Elite 16 |
| 4 | (Mauritius) Roche-Bois Warriors | 3 | 0 | 3 | 128 | 343 | −215 | 3 | |
| 5 | (Zimbabwe) Mercenaries (D) | 0 | 0 | 0 | 0 | 0 | 0 | 0 | Withdrew |

Source: FIBA
(D) Disqualified; (H) Hosts; (W) Advanced with wild card

21 October 2021
| Cape Town Tigers (South Africa) | 81–51 | (Zambia) Matero Magic |
| Ferroviário da Beira (Mozambique) | 116–49 | (Mauritius) Roche-Bois Warriors |
22 October 2021
| Roche-Bois Warriors (Mauritius) | 36–132 | (Mozambique) Ferroviário da Beira |
| Matero Magic (Zambia) | 77–83 | (South Africa) Cape Town Tigers |
23 October 2021
| Matero Magic (Zambia) | 95–43 | (Mauritius) Roche-Bois Warriors |
| Cape Town Tigers (South Africa) | 86–85 | (Mozambique) Ferroviário da Beira |

== Elite 16 ==
In the elite 16, two groups of eight teams were created consisting of the top two teams and wild cards of the first round. AS Salé, as the national champions of Morocco, directly enters this stage. Competition began on 2 December 2021 (Division East) in Johannesburg and 11 December 2021 (Division West) in Yaounde. The top three teams from each group advance to the 2022 BAL season.

On 20 November 2021, the draw was held in Abidjan. On 11 December, FIBA announced ASPAC had withdrawn and AS Salé was not available.

=== Division West ===
==== Group G1 ====
| Pos | Team | Pld | W | L | PF | PA | PD | Pts | Qualification |
|---|---|---|---|---|---|---|---|---|---|
| 1 | (Cameroon) FAP | 2 | 2 | 0 | 157 | 130 | +27 | 4 | Advance to semi-finals |
| 2 | (Mali) AS Police | 2 | 1 | 1 | 151 | 144 | +7 | 3 | Advance to semi-finals |
| 3 | (Ivory Coast) SOA | 2 | 0 | 2 | 134 | 168 | −34 | 2 | |
| 4 | (Benin) ASPAC (D) | 0 | 0 | 0 | 0 | 0 | 0 | 0 | Withdrew |

Source: FIBA
(D) Disqualified

11 December 2021
| SOA (Ivory Coast) | 64–83 | (Cameroon) FAP |
12 December 2021
| AS Police (Mali) | 85–70 | (Ivory Coast) SOA |
13 December 2021
| FAP (Cameroon) | 74–66 | (Mali) AS Police |

==== Group G2 ====
| Pos | Team | Pld | W | L | PF | PA | PD | Pts | Qualification |
|---|---|---|---|---|---|---|---|---|---|
| 1 | (Guinea) SLAC | 2 | 1 | 1 | 171 | 158 | +13 | 3 (Note: Ranking based on point difference: 1) SLAC +13; 2) Espoir Fukash +2; 3) Nigelec –15.) | Advance to semi-finals |
| 2 | (Democratic Republic of the Congo) Espoir Fukash | 2 | 1 | 1 | 195 | 193 | +2 | 3 | Advance to semi-finals |
| 3 | (Niger) Nigelec | 2 | 1 | 1 | 158 | 173 | −15 | 3 | |
| 4 | (Morocco) AS Salé (D) | 0 | 0 | 0 | 0 | 0 | 0 | 0 | Withdrew |

Source: FIBA
(D) Disqualified
Notes:

11 December 2021
| Nigelec (Niger) | 104–91 | (Democratic Republic of the Congo) Espoir Fukash |
12 December 2021
| Espoir Fukash (Democratic Republic of the Congo) | 104–89 | (Guinea) SLAC |
13 December 2021
| SLAC (Guinea) | 82–54 | (Niger) Nigelec |

==== Final stage ====
Semi-finals
15 December
(Cameroon) FAP | 70
(Democratic Republic of the Congo) Espoir Fukash | 56
15 December
(Guinea) SLAC (OT) | 81
(Mali) AS Police | 78

Final
16 December
(Cameroon) FAP | 81
(Guinea) SLAC | 34
Third place game
16 December
(Democratic Republic of the Congo) Espoir Fukash (OT) | 93
(Mali) AS Police | 87

===== Semi-finals =====
15 December 2021
15:00

Report

| SLAC (Guinea) | 81–78 (OT) | (Mali) AS Police |
Scoring by quarter: 13–15, 25–11, 18–20, 14–24, Overtime: 11–8
| Pts: Miller Jr. 26; Rebs: Miller Jr. 10; Asts: Miller Jr. 6 | | Pts: Konaté 24; Rebs: Diarouma 17; Asts: Kanouté 4 |

Yaoundé Multipurpose Sports Complex, Yaoundé

15 December 2021
18:00

Report

| FAP (Cameroon) | 70–56 | (Democratic Republic of the Congo) Espoir Fukash |
Scoring by quarter: 19–12, 21–11, 11–19, 19–14
| Pts: Lyle 17; Rebs: Ngaransou 10; Asts: Essome, Liale 3 | | Pts: Kapongo Kabuya 14; Rebs: Fula Nganga 9 Asts: Mwana Mwamba 3 |

Yaoundé Multipurpose Sports Complex, Yaoundé

===== Third place game =====
16 December 2021
15:00

Report

| Espoir Fukash (Democratic Republic of the Congo) | 93–87 (OT) | (Mali) AS Police |
Scoring by quarter: 20–22, 24–17, 14–22, 20–17, Overtime: 15–9
| Pts: Fula Nganga 29; Rebs: Mutomb Mbav 16; Asts: Mwana Mwamba 8 | | Pts: Kanouté 20; Rebs: Diarouma 21; Asts: Banza Kasongo 5 |

Yaoundé Multipurpose Sports Complex, Yaoundé

===== Final =====
16 December 2021
18:00

Report

| FAP (Cameroon) | 81–34 | (Guinea) SLAC |
Scoring by quarter: 21–8, 22–5, 21–15, 17–6
| Pts: Almeida 19; Rebs: Ngaransou 12; Asts: Liale 4 | | Pts: Poole 9 Rebs: Miller Jr. 11; Asts: Fofana 2 |

Yaoundé Multipurpose Sports Complex, Yaoundé

=== Division East ===
The Division East games were played from 6 December until 11 December at the Wembley Stadium in Johannesburg, South Africa.

==== Group H1 ====
| Pos | Team | Pld | W | L | PF | PA | PD | Pts | Qualification |
|---|---|---|---|---|---|---|---|---|---|
| 1 | (Burundi) New Star | 2 | 2 | 0 | 161 | 141 | +20 | 4 | Advance to semi-finals |
| 2 | (South Africa) Cape Town Tigers | 2 | 1 | 1 | 150 | 146 | +4 | 3 | Advance to semi-finals |
| 3 | (Zambia) Matero Magic | 2 | 0 | 2 | 133 | 157 | −24 | 2 | |
| 4 | (Tanzania) Kurasini Heat (D) | 0 | 0 | 0 | 0 | 0 | 0 | 0 | Withdrew |

Source: FIBA
(D) Disqualified

6 December 2021
| New Star (Burundi) | 83–71 | (South Africa) Cape Town Tigers |
7 December 2021
| Matero Magic (Zambia) | 70–78 | (Burundi) New Star |
8 December 2021
| Cape Town Tigers (South Africa) | 79–63 | (Zambia) Matero Magic |

==== Group H2 ====
| Pos | Team | Pld | W | L | PF | PA | PD | Pts | Qualification |
|---|---|---|---|---|---|---|---|---|---|
| 1 | (Mozambique) Ferroviário da Beira | 2 | 2 | 0 | 157 | 105 | +52 | 4 | Advance to semi-finals |
| 2 | (South Sudan) Cobra Sport | 2 | 1 | 1 | 123 | 143 | −20 | 3 | Advance to semi-finals |
| 3 | (Kenya) Ulinzi Warriors | 2 | 0 | 2 | 126 | 158 | −32 | 2 | |
| 4 | (Uganda) City Oilers (D) | 0 | 0 | 0 | 0 | 0 | 0 | 0 | Withdrew (Note: On 6 December 2021, it was announced City Oilers had withdrawn due to the COVID-19 pandemic.) |

Source: FIBA
(D) Disqualified

6 December 2021
| Ferroviário da Beira (Mozambique) | 76–46 | (South Sudan) Cobra Sport |
7 December 2021
| Cobra Sport (South Sudan) | 77–67 | (Kenya) Ulinzi Warriors |
8 December 2021
| Ferroviário da Beira (Mozambique) | 81–59 | (Kenya) Ulinzi Warriors |

==== Final stage ====
Semi-finals
10 December
(Burundi) New Star | 76
(South Sudan) Cobra Sport | 78
10 December
(Mozambique) Ferroviário da Beira | 77
(South Africa) Cape Town Tigers | 75

Final
11 December
(South Sudan) Cobra Sport | 65
(Mozambique) Ferroviário da Beira | 91
Third place game
11 December
(Burundi) New Star | 0
(South Africa) Cape Town Tigers | 20

===== Semi-finals =====
10 December 2021
15:30

Report

| New Star (Burundi) | 76–78 | (South Sudan) Cobra Sport |
Scoring by quarter: 18-13, 19–28, 13–26, 26–11
| Pts: Calvo Masa 33; Rebs: Ndikumana 11; Asts: Gasana 6 | | Pts: Tang 27; Rebs: Wamukota 13; Asts: Wamukota, Deng 5 |

Wembley Stadium, Johannesburg

10 December 2021
18:30

Report

| Ferroviário da Beira (Mozambique) | 77–75 | (South Africa) Cape Town Tigers |
Scoring by quarter: 27–15, 13–31, 18–20, 19–9
| Pts: Nurmamade 24; Rebs: Ubisse 11; Asts: Kennedy 8 | | Pts: Ganapamo 17; Rebs: Preston 10; Asts: Preston, Kabongo 6 |

Wembley Stadium, Johannesburg

===== Third place game =====
The third place game was supposed to be played on 11 December 2021, however, the game was cancelled after six players tested positive on COVID-19 hours before the tip-off. It was a later announced that Cape Town qualified as New Star was forced to forfeit.

Cancelled

| New Star (Burundi) | 0–20 | (South Africa) Cape Town Tigers |

Wembley Stadium, Johannesburg

===== Final =====
11 December 2021
20:00

Report

| Cobra Sport (South Sudan) | 65–91 | (Mozambique) Ferroviário da Beira |
Scoring by quarter: 12–17, 18–28, 17–30, 18–16
| Pts: Malual 21; Rebs: Mabior 6 Asts: Wamukota 6 | | Pts: Nurmamade 25; Rebs: Ubisse 9 Asts: Kennedy 7 |

Wembley Stadium, Johannesburg

== Statistics ==
The following were the statistical leaders in the qualification games.

=== Individual statistic leaders ===
| Category | Player | Team(s) | Statistic | Played |
|---|---|---|---|---|
| Efficiency per game | Benke Diarouma | AS Police | 24.5 | 4 |
| Points per game | Rolly Fula Nganga | Espoir Fukash | 19.8 | 6 |
| Rebounds per game | Benke Diarouma | AS Police | 14.0 | 4 |
| Assists per game | Tom Wamukota | Cobra Sport | 5.3 | 4 |
| Steals per game | Tom Wamukota | Cobra Sport | 3.3 | 4 |
| Blocks per game | Ibrahima Diallo | AS Police | 2.8 | 4 |
| Turnovers per game | Arsène Mwana Mwamba | Espoir Fukash | 4.0 | 6 |
| Minutes per game | Dane Miller Jr. | SLAC | 36.2 | 4 |
| FG% | Jermelle Kennedy | Ferroviário da Beira | 56.7% | 7 |
| 3P% | Joel Almeida | FAP | 80.0% | 4 |
| FT% | Landry Ndikumana | New Star | 71.4% | 5 |
| Double-doubles | Billy Preston | Cape Town Tigers | 3 | 5 |
| Double-doubles | Landry Ndikumana | New Star | 3 | 5 |

=== Individual game highs ===
| Category | Player | Team | Statistic |
|---|---|---|---|
| Efficiency | Benke Diarouma | AS Police | 39 |
| Points | Álvaro Calvo Masa | New Star | 33 |
| Rebounds | Benke Diarouma | AS Police | 21 |
| Assists | Micheal Afuwape | AS Nigelec | 11 |
| Steals | Jermelle Kennedy | Ferroviário da Beira | 7 |
| Steals | Micheal Afuwape | AS Nigelec | 7 |
| Blocks | Four players | – | 5 |
| Three pointers | Dieudonné Ndizeye | Cobra Sport | 7 |
| Three pointers | Timothy Terna Kwaor | AS Nigelec | 7 |
