= BUZ National Championship =

Top-level basketball league in Zimbabwe

- Organising body: Basketball Union of Zimbabwe
- Country: Zimbabwe
- Number of teams: 8 (men's); 8 (women's)
- Current champions: Men's: Harare Kings (1st title) (2026); Women's: UZ Sparks (Defending Champions) (2024)
- Most championships: Men's: JBC (6 titles)

The BUZ National Championship is the national championship for men's and women's basketball teams in Zimbabwe. It is organised by the Basketball Union of Zimbabwe (BUZ), and is typically held in May or June. In the current format, both tournaments exists of eight teams each. The current record-holders for men's team is JBC, who have won six championships.

The winners are eligible to play in the Road to BAL, the qualification rounds of the Basketball Africa League (BAL).

== Current teams ==
=== Men's teams ===
- JBC
- Arcadia Bucs
- Legends
- Warriors
- Foxes
- Southern Mavericks
- Leopards Academy
- Harare City Hornets
- Florida mambas

=== Women's teams ===
- UZ Sparks
- Harare City Hornets
- MSU Hawks
- JBC
- Vixens
- Lakers Mzansi
- Bunnies
- NUST Phoenix

== Men's champions ==
- 2004: Highdon Raiders
- 2005:
- 2006:
- 2007:
- 2008: JBC
- 2009: JBC
- 2010: JBC
- 2011:
- 2012: Cameo
- 2013: Cameo
- 2014:
- 2015: JBC
- 2016: JBC
- 2017:
- 2018: Harare City Hornets
- 2019: Mercenaries
- 2020: Cancelled
- 2021: Cancelled
- 2022: Foxes
- 2023: JBC
- 2024: Basket Hounds
- 2025: Basket Hounds
- 2026: Harare Kings

=== Titles by team ===
Team	Titles	Year(s) won
JBC	6	2008, 2009, 2010, 2015, 2016, 2023
Cameo	2	2012, 2013
Highdon Raiders	1	2004
Harare City Hornets	1	2018
Mercenaries	1	2019
Foxes	1	2022
Basket Hounds	1	2024
Harare Kings	1	2026

=== Men's finals ===
Year	Champions	Score	Runners-up	Host city
2012	Cameo	48-47	Mercenaries	Richwood Park
2013	Cameo			Bulawayo
2014				Gweru
2015	JBC	49-39	Cameo	Mutare (Mutare Boys High)
2016	JBC			
2019	Mercenaries	75-60	Foxes	
2022	Foxes	67-52	Mercenaries	Harare (Khanysile Sports Centre)
2023	JBC	68-66		Harare
2024	Basket Hounds	83–64	JBC	Gweru
2025	Basket Hounds	85–52	Mbare Bulls	Mutare
2026	Harare Kings	82–40	JBC	Bulawayo (BCD Courts)

== Women's champions ==
- 2008: JBC
- 2016: Mavericks
- 2019: Harare City Hornets
- 2022: Vixens
- 2023: UZ Sparks
- 2024: UZ Sparks
