= Roche-Bois Warriors =

Roche Bois Warriors
- League: MBBF Super League
- Founded: 2000
- History: Roche-Bois Warriors; 2000–present
- Arena: Gymnase de Phoenix
- Location: Roche Bois, Port Louis, Mauritius
- Head coach: Jerome Tonta
- Championships: 2 (2020, 2023)
Home

Roche-Bois Warriors is a Mauritian basketball club based in the Roche-Bois, a suburb of Port Louis. The team plays in the MBBF Super League, the highest level of basketball in Mauritius. The Warriors have won league championships in 2020 and 2023 and has represented Mauritius in the Road to BAL twice.

== History ==
Established in 2000, the Warriors won their first-ever national championship in 2020, after defeating Mahebourg Flippers in the finals. As a result, the Warriors qualified for the 2022 qualifying tournaments of the Basketball Africa League (BAL) for the first time. This marked the first international appearance of the Warriors. They lost all of their three games.

The Warriors won their second championship in the 2022–23 season. They were eligible to play in the 2024 BAL qualification, but withdrew their participation.

== Honours ==
'MBBF Super League'

- Champions (2): 2019–20, 2022–23

== Players ==
=== Current roster ===
Note: Flags indicate national team eligibility at FIBA-sanctioned events. Players may hold other non-FIBA nationalities not displayed.

Roche Bois Warriors roster
Players
Coaches

Pos.	No.	Nat.	Name
	3	(Mauritius)	Modliar, Jean
	5	(Mauritius)	Alexandrine, Clyde
	6	(Mauritius)	Adele, Otniel
	9	(Mauritius)	Charles, Mitchy
	11	(Mauritius)	Wong Moi Sang, Jean-Phil
	13	(Mauritius)	Laprovidence, Jacques
	12	(Mauritius)	Sissace, Désiré
	16	(Mauritius)	Alexandrine, Howard
	17	(Mauritius)	Frontin, Nathan
	18	(Mauritius)	Madelon, Stéphane
	32	(Mauritius)	Tonta, Louis
	91	(Mauritius)	Gerie, Jean

Head coach

- (Mauritius) Jerome Tonta

Assistant coach(es)

- (Mauritius) Paul Vincent Boitier

Legend

- (C) Team captain
- Injured

- Roster
Updated: October 21, 2021

== In the Basketball Africa League ==
Season	Road to BAL				Main competition		
Season	W	L	Result	Qualified	W	L	Result
2022	0	3	First phase	No	DNQ		
2023	Withdrew				DNQ		
2024							
Total	0	3	0/1				
