= 2022 BAL season =

2nd season of the Basketball Africa League

- Season: 2022
- Dates: 5 March – 28 May 2022
- Games played: 38
- Teams: 12

Regular season
- Season MVP: Michael Dixon (US Monsatir)

Finals
- Champions: (Tunisia) US Monastir (1st title)
- Runners-up: (Angola) Petro de Luanda
- Third place: (Egypt) Zamalek
- Fourth place: (Cameroon) FAP

Records
- Biggest home win: 39 points Monastir 106–67 Cape Town (22 May 2022)
- Winning streak: 6 games Zamalek
- Highest attendance: 10,000; 2022 BAL finals

Seasons
- ← 2021 (Season 1) 2023 (Season 3) →

The 2022 BAL season, also known as BAL Season 2, was the second season of the Basketball Africa League (BAL). The season began on 5 March 2022 and ended with the Finals on 28 May 2022. The group phase was played in the Dakar Arena in Dakar and the Hassan Moustafa Sports Hall in Cairo. The playoffs and finals were played in the BK Arena (Note: The BK Arena was named the Kigali Arena as the name was changed during the season. On May 24, 2022, the arena's name was changed to the BK Arena after a six-year sponsorship deal worth 7 billion RF with the Bank of Kigali.) in Kigali for a second year in a row.

Tunisian club US Monastir won the finals to win its first-ever BAL title, after defeating Angolan club Petro de Luanda in the 2022 BAL Finals. As winners, Monastir qualified for the 2023 FIBA Intercontinental Cup.

== Format ==
On December 9, 2021, the BAL announced a new format for the season, with an expansion of the number of total games to 38. The twelve qualified teams are divided over two conference of six teams, in which all teams play the other teams once. The top eight teams from both conferences advance to the playoffs, which remains a single-elimination tournament.

== Team allocation ==
On 13 October 2021, FIBA announced the 26 teams from 26 countries which participate in the qualification round. Eventually, 8 teams withdrew from the qualifications.

- 1st, 2nd, etc.: Place in the domestic competition
- TH: Title holder
- CW: Cup winner
- QT: National qualification tournament

Group phase
(Egypt) Zamalek^{TH} (1st)	(Tunisia) US Monastir (1st)	(Senegal) DUC (1st)	(Angola) Petro de Luanda (1st)
(Nigeria) ~~Rivers Hoopers~~ (1st)	(Rwanda) REG (1st)	(Morocco) AS Salé (1st)	
First qualifying round
(Algeria) ~~WA Boufarik~~	(Mali) AS Police (1st)	(Cape Verde) ~~Prédio~~	(Uganda) City Oilers (1st)
(Guinea) SLAC (1st)	(Burkina Faso) ~~AOA~~ (1st)	(Benin) ASPAC (1st)	(Niger) Nigelec
(Ivory Coast) SOA (1st)	(Democratic Republic of the Congo) Espoir Fukash (CW)	(Cameroon) FAP (1st)	(Equatorial Guinea) ~~Malabo Kings~~ (1st)
(Central African Republic) Tondema (1st)	(Madagascar) ~~ASCUT~~ (1st)	(South Sudan) Cobra Sport	(Ethiopia) ~~Hawassa City~~
(Tanzania) Kurasini Heat (1st)	(Burundi) New Star	(South Africa) Cape Town Tigers (1st)	(Mozambique) Ferroviário da Beira (QT)
(Mauritius) Roche-Bois Warriors	(Zambia) Matero Magic	(Zimbabwe) ~~Mercenaries~~	(Kenya) Ulinzi Warriors (1st)
(Malawi) Brave Hearts (1st)

Notes

1. DR Congo (COD): In FIBA's team list of 13 October, 2020 national champions ASB Mazembe was announced to be the Congolese representative. However, the Fédération de basketball du Congo (FEBACO) eventually decided to enter 2021 champions Espoir Fukash.
2. Morocco (MOR): AS Salé was initially drawn into the second qualifying round, which it withdrew from. Later, the team was awarded the void spot left after the exclusion of the Rivers Hoopers of Nigeria.
3. Nigeria (NGR): Nigeria's Rivers Hoopers were excluded from the competition as FIBA Africa ruled the championship it won was not valid because it was not hosted by the Nigeria Basketball Federation..
4. Rwanda (RWA): The national champions from Rwanda were given direct qualification, as the country will host the semi-finals and finals. Morocco's representative, AS Salé, has been dropped from the six countries which qualified directly and will enter the Elite 16 of the qualifying tournament.
5. Zimbabwe (ZIM): The representative team from Zimbabwe, Mercenaries pulled out before its games in Group F started.

== Teams ==
The twelve teams for the inaugural BAL season had to qualify in their domestic competitions to be able to play in the league, similar to other FIBA-organised competitions. Six teams qualify directly as domestic champions; six winners of the qualifying tournaments qualify as well.

=== Qualified teams ===
On 22 May 2020, Petro de Luanda was announced as the first qualified team for the 2021 BAL season. The Angolan FAB had abandoned the season due to the COVID-19 pandemic and awarded the team the place without naming it as champions. Four teams made their debut in the competition. On January 14, 2022, FIBA Africa decided to exclude the Rivers Hoopers as it stated that the Nigeria Basketball Federation failed to organise a national championship. The BAL chose to give AS Salé direct qualification to replace the Nigerian team. REG qualified directly for the regular season as Rwanda hosted the playoffs and finals.

The twelve teams were confirmed by the BAL on 9 December 2021.

Cape Town Tigers (South Africa), Cobra Sport (South Sudan), SLAC (Guinea) and Espoir Fukash (DR Congo) all were the first teams from their countries to play in the BAL.

Team	Home city	Qualified as	Qualified on	Previous BAL seasons	Arena	Capacity
(Angola) Petro de Luanda	Luanda, Angola	Champions of the 2020–21 Angolan Basketball League	22 May 2020	1 (2021)	Pavilhão da Cidadela	6,873
(Tunisia) US Monastir	Monastir, Tunisia	Champions of the 2020–21 Championnat National A	8 August 2020	1 (2021)	Mohamed-Mzali Sports Hall	4,075
(Egypt) Zamalek	Giza, Egypt	Champions of the 2020–21 Egyptian Basketball Super League	28 June 2021	1 (**2021**)	Abdulrahman Fawzi Hall	4,000
(Senegal) DUC Dakar	Dakar, Senegal	Champions of the 2021 Nationale 1	8 August 2021	Debut	Marius Ndiaye Stadium	3,000
(Rwanda) REG	Kigali, Rwanda	Champions of the 2020–21 NBL Rwanda	30 October 2021	Debut	Amahoro Indoor Stadium	2,000
(Morocco) AS Salé	Salé, Morocco	Champions of the 2020–21 Division Excellence	9 December 2021	1 (2021)	Salle El Bouâzzaoui	2,000
(South Sudan) Cobra Sport	Juba, South Sudan	Runners-up of East Division	10 December 2021	Debut	Dr. Biar Sports Complex	N/A
(Mozambique) Ferroviário da Beira	Beira, Mozambique	Winners of East Division	10 December 2021	Debut	Estádio do Ferroviário Indoor Hall	N/A
(Guinea) SLAC	Conakry, Guinea	Runners-up of West Division	15 December 2021	Debut	Palais des Sports du Stade du 28 Septembre	N/A
(Cameroon) FAP	Yaoundé, Cameroon	Winners of West Division	15 December 2021	1 (2021)	Yaoundé Multipurpose Sports Complex	5,263
(Democratic Republic of the Congo) Espoir Fukash	Kinshasa, DR Congo	Third place of West Division	16 December 2021	Debut	N/A	
(South Africa) Cape Town Tigers	Cape Town, South Africa	Third place of East Division	11 December 2021 (Note: The third place game between Cape Town Tigers and New Star was supposed to be played on 11 December 2021, however, the game was cancelled after six players tested positive on COVID-19 hours before the tip-off. It was a later announced that Cape Town qualified as New Star was forced to forfeit.)	Debut	N/A	

Bold: the team won the BAL championship in that year.

=== Personnel and sponsorship ===
Team	Head coach	Team captain
AS Salé	(Australia) Liz Mills	(Morocco) Yassine El Mahsini
Cape Town Tigers	(South Africa) Relton Booysen	(South Africa) Pieter Prinsloo
Cobra Sport	(South Sudan) Manny Berberi	(United States) Jared Harrington
DUC Dakar	(Senegal) Parfait Adjivon	(Senegal) Abel Diop
Espoir Fukash	(Democratic Republic of the Congo) Raven Mwimba	(Democratic Republic of the Congo) Rolly Fula
FAP	(Cameroon) François Enyegue	(Cameroon) Ebaku Akumenzoh
Ferroviário da Beira	(Spain) Luis Lopez Hernandez	(Mozambique) Armando Baptista
Petro de Luanda	(Brazil) José Neto	(Angola) Carlos Morais
REG	(United States) Robert Pack	(Rwanda) Elie Kaje
SLAC	(Serbia) Željko Zečević	(Guinea) Mamadi Keita
US Monastir	(Serbia) Miodrag Perišić	(Tunisia) Radhouane Slimane
Zamalek	(United States) Will Voigt	(Egypt) Mostafa Kejo

=== Foreign and Elevate players ===
Each BAL team was allowed to have four foreign players on its roster, including only two non-African players. Players in italics were signed only for the playoffs. If players have multiple nationalities, the nationality of an African nation is shown.

Each team also featured one player from the NBA Academy Africa, under the new BAL Elevate program.

Team	African		Non-African		Elevate player
Team	1	2	3	4	Elevate player
AS Salé	(Niger) Abdoulaye Harouna	(Guinea) Ousmane Drame	(United States) Terrell Stoglin	(Spain) Álvaro Calvo Masa	(Morocco) Nadir Bennis
Cape Town Tigers	(Democratic Republic of the Congo) Myck Kabongo	(Central African Republic) Evans Ganapamo	(United States) Billy Preston	(United States) Cleanthony Early (replaced (United States) Jamel Artis)	(Senegal) Matar Diop
Cobra Sport	(Kenya) Tom Wamukota	—N/a	(United States) Jared Harrington	(United States) Leon Hampton	(South Sudan) Khaman Maluach
DUC	(Ivory Coast) Abraham Sie	(Democratic Republic of the Congo) Chadrack Lufile	(United States) Hameed Ali	(France) Jordan Aboudou	(Senegal) Babacar Sané
Espoir Fukash	—N/a	—N/a	(Canada) Narcisse Ambanza	—N/a	(Nigeria) Emmanuel Okorafor
FAP	(Cape Verde) Joel Almeida	(Senegal) Abou Diallo	(United States) Tyjhai Byers	(United States) Deshaun Norman	(Cameroon) Ulrich Chomche
Ferroviário da Beira	—N/a	—N/a	(United States) Will Perry	(Canada) Jermel Kennedy	(Nigeria) Rueben Chinyelu
Petro de Luanda	(Cape Verde) Anderson Correia	—N/a	(United States) E. C. Matthews	—N/a	(Central African Republic) Thierry Darlan
REG	(Democratic Republic of the Congo) Pitchou Kambuy Manga	(Senegal) Abdoulaye N'Doye	(United States) Cleveland Thomas	(United States) Anthony Walker	(Nigeria) Joy Ighovodja
SLAC	(Nigeria) Josh Nzeakor	(Nigeria) Chris Obekpa	(United States) Dane Miller Jr.	(United States) Malcolm Griffin (replaced (United States) Chris Crawford)	(Senegal) Serigne Mbaye
US Monastir	(Ivory Coast) Solo Diabate	(South Sudan) Ater Majok	(Georgia (country)) Michael Dixon	(United States) Julius Coles Jr.	(Cameroon) Charles Loic Onana
Zamalek	(Cameroon) D. J. Strawberry	(Nigeria) Ike Diogu	(Dominican Republic) Édgar Sosa	(United States) Mikh McKinney	(Senegal) Khadim Rassoul Mboup

== Schedule ==
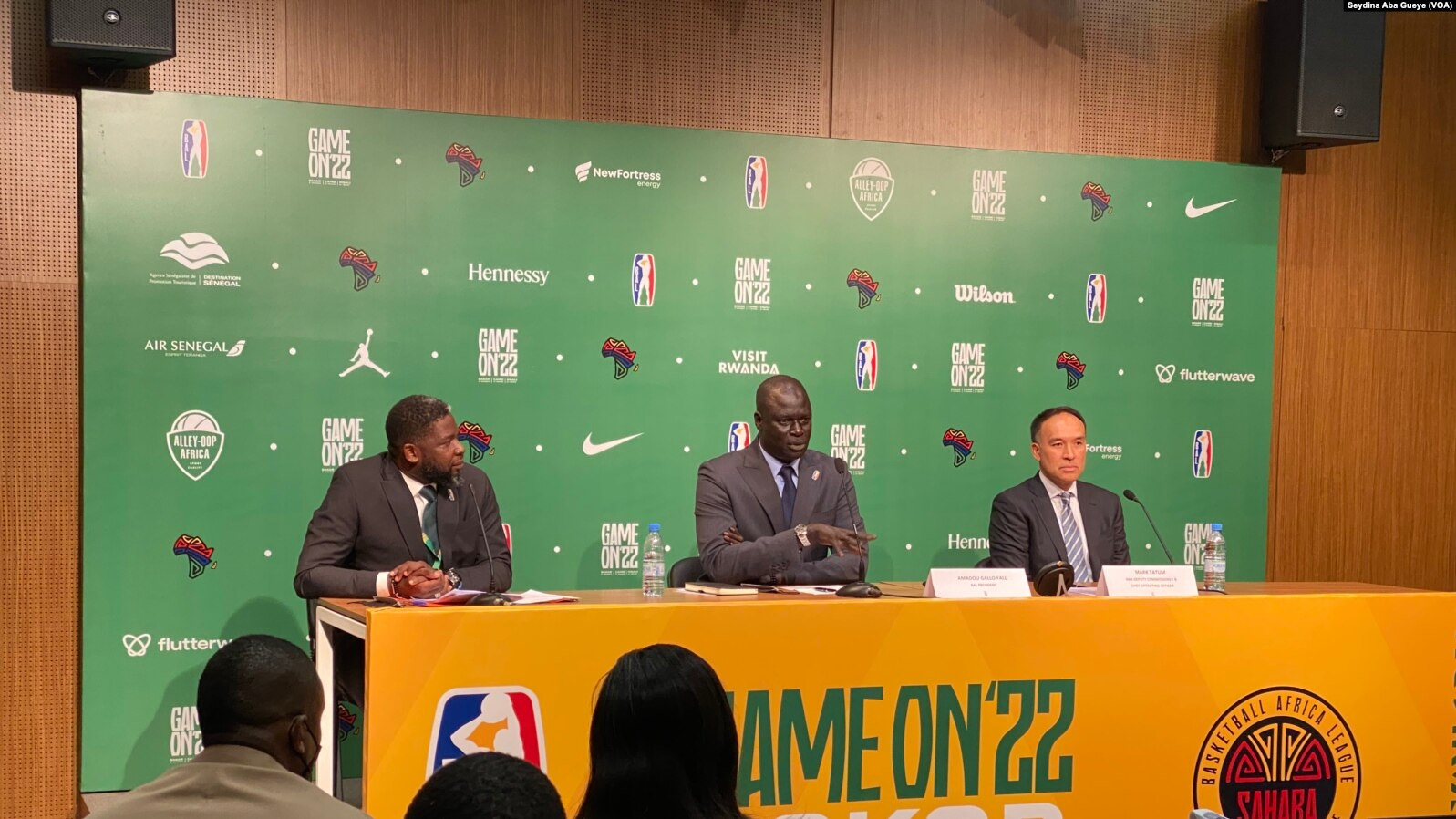
A press conference of the BAL in March 2022

Phase	Round	Draw date	Games
Qualifying	First round	13 October 2021	21–31 October 2021
Qualifying	Elite 16	20 November 2021	6–16 December 2021
Group phase	Dakar	–	5–15 March 2022
Group phase	Cairo	–	9–19 April 2022
Playoffs	Quarter-finals	–	21–28 May 2022
Playoffs	Semi-finals	–	21–28 May 2022
Playoffs	Final and third place	–	21–28 May 2022

== Qualifying tournaments ==
The qualifying tournaments started on 21 October 2021 and ended on 16 December 2021, with 23 teams from 23 countries participating. Six teams qualified for the group phase.

== Group phase ==
The group phase began on 5 March 2022 in the Dakar Arena in Dakar, where 15 games will be played. From 9 April to 19 April 2022, the group phase continued in Hassan Moustafa Sports Hall in Giza. The four best teams of each conference advanced to the playoffs.

=== Sahara Conference ===
Pos	Team	Pld	W	L	PF	PA	PD	PCT	Qualification	REG	USM	ASS	SLC	CFV	DUC
1	(Rwanda) REG	5	4	1	431	423	+8	.800 (Note: Head-to-head: REG 77–74 US Monastir on 14 March 2022.)	Advance to playoffs	—	77–74	91–87	83–81	—	—
2	(Tunisia) US Monastir	5	4	1	397	355	+42	.800	Advance to playoffs	—	—	—	—	77–71	74–62
3	(Morocco) AS Salé	5	3	2	454	438	+16	.600	Advance to playoffs	—	90–96	—	91–81	95–84	—
4	(Guinea) SLAC	5	2	3	392	394	−2	.400	Advance to playoffs	—	55–76	—	—	90–74	—
5	(Mozambique) Ferroviário da Beira	5	1	4	416	448	−32	.200 (Note: Head-to-head: Ferroviário da Beira 98–92 DUC on 8 March 2022.)		89–94	—	—	—	—	98–92
6	(Senegal) DUC (H)	5	1	4	402	434	−32	.200		92–86	—	86–91	70–85	—	—

Source: BAL, Afrobasket
Legend: Blue = home team win; Red = away team win.
(H) Hosts

=== Nile Conference ===
Pos	Team	Pld	W	L	PF	PA	PD	PCT	Qualification	ZAM	PDL	CTT	FAP	CBS	ESF
1	(Egypt) Zamalek (H)	5	5	0	444	367	+77	1.000	Advance to playoffs	—	85–72	—	77–63	80–63	—
2	(Angola) Petro de Luanda	5	4	1	421	326	+95	.800	Advance to playoffs	—	—	—	73–60	92–56	94–64
3	(South Africa) Cape Town Tigers	5	2	3	386	436	−50	.400 (Note: Head-to-head: Cape Town Tigers 73–70 FAP on 13 April 2022.)	Advance to playoffs	77–101	61–90	—	—	—	—
4	(Cameroon) FAP	5	2	3	341	347	−6	.400	Advance to playoffs	—	—	70–73	—	71–64	77–60
5	(South Sudan) Cobra Sport	5	1	4	370	408	−38	.200 (Note: Head-to-head: Cobra Sport 108–82 Espoir Fukash on 13 April 2022.)		—	—	79–83	—	—	108–82
6	(Democratic Republic of the Congo) Espoir Fukash	5	1	4	394	472	−78	.200		92–101	—	96–92	—	—	—

Source: BAL, Afrobasket
Legend: Blue = home team win; Red = away team win.
(H) Hosts

== Playoffs ==
The playoffs began on 21 May and ended on 28 May with the Finals. All games were played in a single-elimination format, and the entire tournament was played at the Kigali Arena in Kigali.

=== Bracket ===
Quarterfinals
21 May
N2 (Angola) Petro de Luanda	102
S3 (Morocco) AS Salé	89
21 May
S1 (Rwanda) REG	63
N4 (Cameroon) FAP	66
22 May
N1 (Egypt) Zamalek	66
S4 (Guinea) SLAC	49
22 May
S2 (Tunisia) US Monastir	106
N3 (South Africa) Cape Town Tigers	67

Semifinals
25 May
(Angola) Petro de Luanda	88
(Cameroon) FAP	74
25 May
(Egypt) Zamalek	81
(Tunisia) US Monastir	88

Finals
28 May
(Angola) Petro de Luanda	72
(Tunisia) US Monastir	83
Third place game
27 May
(Cameroon) FAP	74
(Egypt) Zamalek	97

== Awards ==
This season, the Coach of the Year award and All-Defensive First Team were introduced and announced on 27 May. The MVP and Defensive Player of the Year were announced on 28 May 2022. The BAL Ubuntu Award, for the player that made the greatest contribution to his community, was awarded on 16 March 2023 after a fan vote.

- Most Valuable Player: Michael Dixon, US Monastir
- Defensive Player of the Year: Ater Majok, US Monastir
- Coach of the Year: José Neto, Petro de Luanda
- Sportsmanship Award: Anas Mahmoud, Zamalek
- Ubuntu Award: Jean Jacques Nshobozwabyosenumukiza, REG
- All-BAL First Team:
  - Terrell Stoglin, AS Salé
  - Édgar Sosa, Zamalek
  - Carlos Morais, Petro de Luanda
  - Radhouane Slimane, US Monastir
  - Ater Majok, US Monastir
- All-Defensive Team:
  - Wilson Nshobozwabyosenumukiza, REG
  - Childe Dundão, Petro de Luanda
  - Aboubakar Gakou, Petro de Luanda
  - Brice Eyaga Bidias, FAP
  - Ater Majok, US Monastir

== Statistics ==
The following were the statistical leaders in 2022 BAL season, including all playoff games.

=== Individual statistic leaders ===
Category	Player	Team(s)	Statistic
Points per game	Terrell Stoglin	AS Salé	30.8
Rebounds per game	Mayan Kiir	Cobra Sport	11.4
Assists per game	Hameed Ali	DUC	8.4
Steals per game	Childe Dundão	Petro de Luanda	3.0
Blocks per game	Chris Obekpa	SLAC	4.6
Turnovers per game	Dane Miller Jr.	SLAC	4.4
Minutes per game	Dane Miller Jr.	SLAC	37.8
FG%	Mohamed Keita	SLAC	75.0%
FG%	Soufiane Kourdou	AS Salé	75.0%
3P%	Michael Dixon	US Monastir	47.4%
FT%	Mikh McKinney	Zamalek	90.7%

=== Individual game highs ===
Category	Player	Team	Statistic
Points	Terrell Stoglin	AS Salé	41
Rebounds	Mayan Kiir	Cobra Sport	22
Assists	Hameed Ali	DUC	15
Steals	Childe Dundão	Petro de Luanda	7
Blocks	Anas Mahmoud	Zamalek	6
Three pointers	Wilson Nshobozwabyosenumukiza	REG	8

=== Team statistic leaders ===
Category	Team	Statistic
Points per game	AS Salé	90.5
Rebounds per game	Espoir Fukash	47.8
Assists per game	Petro de Luanda	21.5
Steals per game	Petro de Luanda	10.6
Blocks per game	SLAC	4.8
Turnovers per game	Espoir Fukash	20.6
Fouls per game	REG	22.3
FG%	US Monastir	48.1%
FT%	US Monastir	75.3%
3FG%	AS Salé	38.9%
