= Nyang Wek =

South Sudanese basketball player

No. 24 – Bangui Sporting Club
- Position: Small forward
- League: Basketball Africa League

Personal information
- Born: 6 March 1996 (age 30) South Sudan
- Listed height: 1.98 m (6 ft 6 in)

Career information
- High school: French Camp Academy (French Camp, Mississippi)
- College: Lane College
- NBA draft: 2018: undrafted
- Playing career: 2018–present

Career history
- 2018: Dallas Ballers
- 2022: Cobra Sport
- 2023: JBC
- 2024–present: Bangui Sporting Club

Nyang Luol "Tako" Wek III (born 9 March 1996) is a South Sudanese basketball player who last played for Bangui SC of the Basketball Africa League (BAL). Wek has been a member of the South Sudan national team, and played at FIBA AfroBasket 2021 with his country.

== Early life and high school career ==
Wek was born in South Sudan but moved to the United States at age 9. He attended French Camp Academy in Mississippi, where he began playing basketball as a freshman. As a junior, Wek averaged 19 points per game and had consecutive 40-point games. He was expelled during his senior season. Wek moved to Memphis, Tennessee and earned a football scholarship to Lane College. He dropped out of Lane after a season, due to feeling that football was not right for him. Wek moved to Dallas, Texas and found work delivering plumbing supplies.

== Professional career ==
Wek played with the Dallas Ballers in the first season of the Junior Basketball Association (JBA). His girlfriend spotted the ad for the tryout and sent it to him. He was suspended for three games due to a conflict with another player.

On March 2, 2022, Wek signed with South Sudanese club Cobra Sport of the Basketball Africa League (BAL).

In November 2023, Wek played for Zimbabwean club JBC in the Road to BAL. In two games, he averaged 11 points and 10.5 rebounds for JBC, who failed to advance to the final round.

In April 2024, Wek joined Bangui Sporting Club for the 2024 BAL season.

== National team career ==
Wek was on the South Sudan national basketball team for AfroBasket 2021. As a starter, he contributed 5 points and 2.5 rebounds per game, helping South Sudan reach the quarterfinals.

== BAL career statistics ==
Legend
| GP | Games played | GS | Games started | MPG | Minutes per game |
| FG% | Field goal percentage | 3P% | 3-point field goal percentage | FT% | Free throw percentage |
| RPG | Rebounds per game | APG | Assists per game | SPG | Steals per game |
| BPG | Blocks per game | PPG | Points per game | **Bold** | Career high |

| Year | Team | GP | GS | MPG | FG% | 3P% | FT% | RPG | APG | SPG | BPG | PPG |
|---|---|---|---|---|---|---|---|---|---|---|---|---|
| 2022 | Cobra Sport | 5 | 3 | 25.8 | .419 | .320 | .286 | 5.8 | 1.4 | 1.6 | .4 | 9.6 |
| Career | | 5 | 3 | 25.8 | .419 | .320 | .286 | 5.8 | 1.4 | 1.6 | .4 | 9.6 |
