= Hicham Benayad-Cherif =

Canadian-Algerian basketball player

Personal information
- Born: 24 February 1990 (age 36) Laval, Quebec, Canada
- Listed height: 2.01 m (6 ft 7 in)
- Listed weight: 102 kg (225 lb)

Career information
- High school: Montmorency High School (Montreal, Canada)
- College: Fort Wayne (2010–2012); Armstrong Athletic (2012–2014)
- Playing career: 2016–2021
- Position: Small forward

Career history
- 2016–2017: KW Titans
- 2017–2021: GS Pétroliers

Career highlights
- BAL Ubuntu Award (2021)

Hicham Benayad-Cherif (born 24 February 1990) is a Canadian-Algerian former basketball player. He represents the Algeria national team. He was the winner of the BAL Ubuntu Award in 2021.

== Career ==
Benayad-Cherif played two seasons for Fort Wayne, and red-shirted his first season there.

Benayad-Cherif started his professional career with the KW Titans of the NBL Canada in 2016.

In 2019, he was a member of the GS Pétroliers team that qualified for the 2021 BAL season.

== Personal ==
Benayad-Cherif founded the Elite Student Academy in Algeria in 2018, an organisation which consists of 800 student athletes. He won the inaugural BAL Ubuntu Award in the 2021 season, "for his ongoing efforts to use the game of basketball to positively impact the lives of Algerian youth."

== BAL career statistics ==
Legend
GP	Games played	GS	Games started	MPG	Minutes per game
FG%	Field goal percentage	3P%	3-point field goal percentage	FT%	Free throw percentage
RPG	Rebounds per game	APG	Assists per game	SPG	Steals per game
BPG	Blocks per game	PPG	Points per game	**Bold**	Career high

Year	Team	GP	GS	MPG	FG%	3P%	FT%	RPG	APG	SPG	BPG	PPG
2021	GS Pétroliers	3	1	25.4	.231	.154	.250	2.0	.3	.0	.3	5.0
Career		3	1	25.4	.231	.154	.250	2.0	.3	.0	.3	5.0
