= Burkinabé Men's Basketball Championship =

- Sport: Basketball
- No. of teams: 20
- Country: Burkina Faso
- Most recent champion(s): AS Douanes (2025)

The Burkinabé Men's Basketball Championship (in French: Championnat du basket-ball hommes du Burkinabé) is the top division basketball league in Burkina Faso. The league is organised by the Burkinabé Basketball Federation (FEBBA) and existed of 20 teams in the 2021–22 season.

The championship is decided by a single-game final, and the champions are eligible to compete in the Road to BAL, although no team has yet participated.

== Champions ==
- 2011: Étoile Filante de Ouagadougou
- 2016: Rail Club du Kadiogo
- 2017: Rail Club du Kadiogo
- 2018: Rail Club du Kadiogo
- 2019: Rail Club du Kadiogo
- 2020: not held due to COVID-19
- 2021: AOA
- 2022: AS Sonabhy
- 2023: AOA
- 2024: USFA
- 2025: AS Douanes

== Finals ==
Season	Champions	Runners-up	Score
2011	Étoile Filante de Ouagadougou	AS Sonabel	49–45
2017–18	Rail Club du Kadiogo		
2018–19	Rail Club du Kadiogo	AS Sonabhy	68–57
2020–21	AOA	AS Sonabhy	65–61
2021–22	AS Sonabhy	AOA	56–55
2022–23	AOA	AS Sonabhy	
2023–24	USFA	AOA	47–43
2024–25	AS Douanes	USFA	51–29
