= Bopp =

Bopp IPA: /bɑːp/ is a surname. Notable people with the surname include:

- Edward S. Bopp (1930–2015), American politician
- Emery Bopp (1924–2007), American artist
- Eugen Bopp (born 1983), Ukrainian-born German footballer
- Franz Bopp (1791–1867), German linguist
- Friedrich Bopp (1909–1987) German physicist
- James Bopp Jr. (born 1948), American conservative lawyer
- Karl Bopp (1877–1934), German historian of mathematics
- Thomas Bopp (1949–2018), American astronomer, co-discoverer of Comet Hale-Bopp
- Yésica Bopp (born 1984), Argentine boxer

== See also ==
- Biaxially oriented polypropylene
