= Joel Almeida =

Joel Almeida may refer to:

- Joel Ayala Almeida (born 1946), Mexican politician
- Joel Almeida (basketball) (born 1985), Cape Verdean and Portuguese basketball player
