= Khaman Maluach =

South Sudanese basketball player (born 2006)

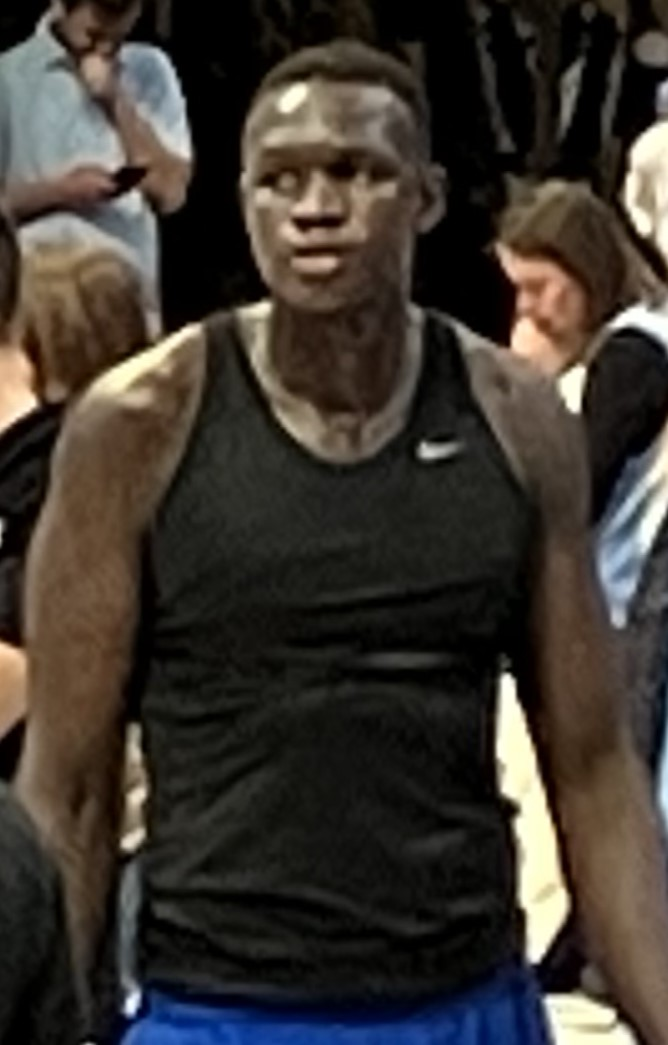
- Maluach with Duke in 2025

No. 10 – Phoenix Suns
- Position: Center
- League: NBA

Personal information
- Born: 14 September 2006 (age 20) Rumbek, South Sudan
- Listed height: 7 ft 1 in (2.16 m)
- Listed weight: 250 lb (113 kg)

Career information
- High school: Bethel Covenant College (Bwebajja, Central Region, Uganda); NBA Academy Africa (Saly, Senegal)
- College: Duke (2024–2025)
- NBA draft: 2025: 1st round, 10th overall pick
- Drafted by: Houston Rockets
- Playing career: 2022–present

Career history
- 2022: Cobra Sport
- 2023: AS Douanes
- 2024: City Oilers
- 2025–present: Phoenix Suns
- 2025: →Valley Suns

Career highlights
- BAL rebounding leader (2024); Basketball Without Borders MVP (2023); ACC All-Freshman Team (2025)
- Stats at NBA.com
- Stats at Basketball Reference

Khaman Madit Maluach (born 14 September 2006) is a South Sudanese professional basketball player for the Phoenix Suns of the National Basketball Association (NBA). He played college basketball for the Duke Blue Devils. Standing at 7 ft 1 in (2.16 m), he plays the center position. He is also a current member of the South Sudan national team, which he joined at the age of 16.

== Early life ==
Born in Rumbek, Sudan (now South Sudan), Maluach grew up in Kawempe, a small town in Uganda, as a refugee with his siblings and mother. He attended Bethel Covenant College in Bwebajja.

In 2019, Maluach was encouraged to play basketball by a boda boda motorcyclist who had stopped down when he saw the tall Maluach walking along the road. He attended a local camp organised by Luol Deng and started playing basketball. He later joined the NBA Academy Africa in Saly, Senegal, where basketball is combined with education.

== College career ==
On 6 March 2024, Maluach announced his commitment to Duke. Ranked as the third-best prospect in the 2025 NBA draft by ESPN at the time, he chose Duke over UCLA, Kentucky, and Kansas. He stated that this was due to the impression Zion Williamson had on him when he was younger. Maluach opted to play with number 9, honouring Luol Deng. He would be joined by two other top-rated prospects in Cooper Flagg and Kon Knueppel (both of whom would later end up being top-five selections in the 2025 NBA draft) during the season he was with Duke. Maluach averaged 8.6 points on 71.2% shooting, as well as 6.6 rebounds and 1.3 blocks per game at Duke.

== Professional career ==
=== Basketball Africa League (2022–2024) ===
Maluach played for the South Sudanese professional team Cobra Sport in the 2022 BAL season, as part of the BAL Elevate program. Through this programme, one NBA Academy Africa player was assigned to each Basketball Africa League (BAL) team on an amateur contract. He made his BAL debut on 9 April 2022 against defending champions Zamalek, scoring two points and recording two rebounds in seven minutes.

In March 2023, Maluach played in his second BAL season after he was drafted first among the academy prospects by the AS Douanes, the defending Senegalese champions. The Douanes reached the final, in which Maluach started and contributed 2 points and 4 rebounds, as they lost to Al Ahly.

He attended the 2023 Basketball Without Borders in Johannesburg, South Africa, and was named the camp's MVP.

On 4 March 2024, it was announced that Maluach was drafted by the Ugandan club City Oilers for the 2024 BAL season. On 19 April, Maluach had 16 points and 8 rebounds in his Oilers debut in a 76–99 loss to Al Ahly. One day later, on 20 April, Maluach set new career highs with 29 points and 11 rebounds in a 88–101 loss against Bangui. On 24 April, Maluach had 16 points, 19 rebounds and 7 blocks in a 68–79 loss to Al-Ahly Ly. His 19 rebounds set a new career high, and his 7 blocks set a then-league record for most blocks by any player in a BAL game. Despite the Oilers being eliminated, Maluach averaged 17.5 points, a league-leading 13.5 rebounds, and 2.8 blocks per game over his six performances.

=== Phoenix Suns (2025–present) ===
On 25 June 2025, Maluach was drafted 10th overall by the Houston Rockets in the 2025 NBA draft; however, he was traded to the Phoenix Suns as part of the Kevin Durant trade that was finalized on 6 July 2025. Alongside Maluach, the Suns acquired Jalen Green, Dillon Brooks, the draft rights to Rasheer Fleming and Koby Brea, and a 2026 second-round pick, all of which ultimately became a part of a seven-team deal. Maluach became the highest-drafted player ever from the NBA Academy Africa, as well as from the Basketball Africa League (BAL).

On 15 December 2025, Maluach was assigned to the Suns' NBA G League affiliate, the Valley Suns. On 8 April 2026, Maluach made his first NBA start, recording four points, 14 rebounds, and three blocks during a 112–107 victory over the Dallas Mavericks.

== National team career ==
In August 2023, Maluach was selected for the South Sudan national team roster for the 2023 FIBA Basketball World Cup. At age 16, he was the youngest player on the Bright Stars' roster. On 28 August 2023, he made his debut in a victory against China, becoming the third-youngest player to appear in a World Cup game. Maluach and South Sudan were the best-ranked African team in the tournament, and thus qualified for the 2024 Summer Olympics in Paris, another milestone in the national team's history.

He played with South Sudan at the 2024 Olympics and was the youngest player in the tournament. He averaged 0.7 points in 4.3 minutes per game over three games, playing a minor role for the Bright Stars.

== Player profile ==
Maluach has a 7 ft 6.75 in (2.31 m) wingspan, and has been praised for his work ethic and athletic abilities.

== Career statistics ==
Legend
GP	Games played	GS	Games started	MPG	Minutes per game
FG%	Field goal percentage	3P%	3-point field goal percentage	FT%	Free throw percentage
RPG	Rebounds per game	APG	Assists per game	SPG	Steals per game
BPG	Blocks per game	PPG	Points per game	**Bold**	Career high

*	League leader during season

=== NBA ===
==== Regular season ====
Year	Team	GP	GS	MPG	FG%	3P%	FT%	RPG	APG	SPG	BPG	PPG
2025–26	Phoenix	46	1	8.9	.533	.238	.710	2.9	.1	.1	.7	3.0
Career		46	1	8.9	.533	.238	.710	2.9	.1	.1	.7	3.0

==== Playoffs ====
Year	Team	GP	GS	MPG	FG%	3P%	FT%	RPG	APG	SPG	BPG	PPG
2026	Phoenix	4	0	11.3	.500	.000	–	2.3	.0	.0	.0	2.0
Career		4	0	11.3	.500	.000	–	2.3	.0	.0	.0	2.0

=== BAL ===
Year	Team	GP	GS	MPG	FG%	3P%	FT%	RPG	APG	SPG	BPG	PPG
2022	Cobra Sport	5	0	11.8	.364	.000	.500	3.4	.6	.2	1.0	2.2
2023	AS Douanes	**7**	2	11.5	.346	**.250**	.667	4.4	.4	.3	.4	3.4
2024	City Oilers	6	**5**	**34.3**	**.519**	.235	**.724**	**13.5***	**.8**	**.7**	**2.8**	**17.8**

=== College ===
Year	Team	GP	GS	MPG	FG%	3P%	FT%	RPG	APG	SPG	BPG	PPG
2024–25	Duke	39	39	21.2	.712	.250	.766	6.6	.5	.2	1.3	8.6
