= Académie d'Or des Archers =

AOA
- Nickname: Archers
- League: Burkinabé Men's Basketball Championship
- Location: Ouagadougou, Burkina Faso
- Championships: 1 (2021)
- Website: aoa-sports.com

Académie d'Or des Archers (in English: Golden Academy of Archers), shortly AOA or Archers, is a Burkinabé basketball club based in Ouagadougou. The club is an academy with several teams in the boys and girls junior level. Its men's team plays in the highest national championship.

On August 21, 2021, the Archers won the Burkinabé national championship after defeating AS Sonabhy in the final. As a result, the team qualified to play in the 2022 qualifying tournaments of the Basketball Africa League (BAL).

== Honours ==
Burkinabé Men's Basketball Championship

Champions: 2021

Burkinabé SuperCup

Winners: 2021
