= Santa Rita High School =

Location
- 3951 S Pantano Rd; Tucson, Arizona; United States; 32°10′34″N 110°49′21″W

Information
- Type: Public
- Established: September 2, 1969
- School district: Tucson Unified School District
- CEEB code: 030513
- Principal: Tamara Ray
- Staff: 26.60 (FTE)
- Enrollment: 333 (2023-2024)
- Student to teacher ratio: 12.52
- Colors: Green and gold
- Team name: Eagles
- Website: santaritahs.tusd1.org

Santa Rita High School is located in Groves Lincoln Park, Tucson, Arizona. The school was established in 1969. It was named after the Santa Rita Mountains, one of the mountain ranges surrounding the Tucson valley. Contemporary establishments Sahuaro High School and Sabino High School have similar facilities. The campus has three main two-story classroom buildings where most classes are held. The school educated about 950 students from grades 9 to 12. Graduating classes usually consisted of 300 students. In recent years, enrollment at Santa Rita has dropped. As of the 2023 school year, enrollment was at 392.

In the 1984–85 school year, it was honored as a Blue Ribbon school.

== Campus ==
Most classes are held in the one, two, and three hundred buildings with a few such as Band, Choir, Adv. Culinary Arts, Welding, Construction, Automotive Technology, and Drama held in other buildings. Vocational programs are held in the northernmost building of the campus.

Recently Santa Rita has expanded by adding a secondary, more current gymnasium to their campus.

== Athletics ==
=== Football ===
In the summer of 2007 it was announced that Santa Rita would be hiring a new football coach, Jeff Scurran. After a 0-10 2006–2007 season, the Eagles underwent a radical transformation to an 11-2 team, falling one game short of the championship game. For the next two seasons, the Eagles went to the title game but came up short. The 2008-2009 team had a record of 12-2 and lost to the defending champions from Notre Dame Preparatory High School by a score of 30–26. The 2009-2010 team returned to the state championship with a record of 11–3, but they lost in the coach's final game at the school as Cactus High School would shut them out 14–0.

In 2022, the Eagles were forced to forfeit most of their games due to academic issues and injuries. In Fall 2023, a 33-player squad under new head coach, Doug Smith took the field.

=== Basketball ===
In 98’-‘99 school year, the Eagles led by Coach Ferguson, defeated Thunderbird High for the 4A Boys state title.

In 2009–2010 school year the Eagles won the state championship for 4A-II boys' basketball.

== Notable people ==
- Ron Gould (1983), coach for the Los Angeles Rams
- Anthony Sanders (1993), former MLB outfielder, Olympic gold medalist
