= Narcisse Ambanza =

Congolese basketball player

Free agent
- Position: Guard

Personal information
- Born: December 3, 1996 (age 29) Toronto, Ontario, Canada
- Listed height: 6 ft 2 in (1.88 m)

Career information
- High school: Eastern Commerce Collegiate Institute (Toronto, Ontario)
- College: Winnipeg (2016–2020)
- CEBL draft: 2019: 12th round, 71st overall pick
- Drafted by: Edmonton Stingers

Career history
- 2019: Edmonton Stingers
- 2022: Espoir Fukash

Career highlights
- 2× Canada West Second Team All-Star (2019, 2020); Canada West Third Team All-Star (2018); Canada West All-Rookie Team (2017)

Narcisse Ambanza (born 3 December 1996) is a Congolese-Canadian professional basketball player. He plays for the DR Congo men's national basketball team since making his debut in 2022.

== Life and career ==
Born in Toronto to Congolese parents, he played four seasons of U Sports college basketball for the Winnipeg Wesmen and led the team in scoring in 2018 and 2019. In 2019, Ambanza joined the professional team Edmonton Stingers of the Canadian Elite Basketball League (CEBL).

After sitting out the 2020–21 season that was cancelled due to the COVID-19 pandemic, in 2022, Ambanza joined the Congolese club Espoir Fukash of the Basketball Africa League (BAL).

== Personal life ==
Ambanza graduated with a degree in business administration from the University of Winnipeg.
