= Mohamed Keita (basketball) =

Guinean-Burkinabé basketball player (born 2003)

No. 8 – Temple Owls
- Position: Center
- Conference: American Conference

Personal information
- Born: 20 March 2003 (age 23) Conakry, Guinea
- Listed height: 7 ft 1 in (2.16 m)
- Listed weight: 230 lb (104 kg)

Career information
- High school: NBA Academy Africa (Thiès, Senegal); The Winchendon School (Winchendon, Massachusetts)
- College: St. John's (2022–2023); Tulsa (2023–2024); Temple (2024–present)
- Playing career: 2022–present

Career history
- 2022: SLAC

Mohamed Lamine Keita (born 20 March 2003) is a Guinean-Burkinabé college basketball player for the Temple Owls of the American Conference. He previously played for the St. John's Red Storm and Tulsa Golden Hurricane. An NBA Academy Africa graduate, Keita previously played professionally with SLAC in the Basketball Africa League (BAL) in 2022.

Keita is a 7 ft 1 (2.16 m) tall center, who is known for his defensive and blocking abilities.

== Early career ==
Born in Conakry, Keita played for the NBA Academy Africa in Senegal in his younger years. He also played for The Winchendon School in Massachusetts. With Winchendon, Keita averaged 6.3 points, 8.2 rebounds and 3.4 blocks per game in the AA Division of the NEPSAC.

== College career ==
On 8 May 2022, Keita committed to play collegiately for St. John's, who scouted him during a during a live recruiting spring period with his Amateur Athletic Union (AAU) team, the New York Jayhawks. In his freshmen season at St. John's, he played in only seven games due to injury.

In June 2023, it was announced that Keita transferred to Tulsa for the 2023–24 season.

== Professional career ==
Keita joined the Guinean club SLAC for the Basketball Africa League's 2022 season. On 7 March 2022, Keita recorded his first BAL double-double with 10 points and 12 rebounds in a regular season loss against AS Salé.

== National team career ==
Keita represented the Guinean under-18 national team at the 2018 FIBA U18 African Championship in Egypt.

== Personal ==
Keita is the son of Sory Keita and Aminata Cherif, and he has three siblings.

== BAL career statistics ==
Legend
| GP | Games played | GS | Games started | MPG | Minutes per game |
| FG% | Field goal percentage | 3P% | 3-point field goal percentage | FT% | Free throw percentage |
| RPG | Rebounds per game | APG | Assists per game | SPG | Steals per game |
| BPG | Blocks per game | PPG | Points per game | **Bold** | Career high |
| * | Led the league |

| Year | Team | GP | GS | MPG | FG% | 3P% | FT% | RPG | APG | SPG | BPG | PPG |
|---|---|---|---|---|---|---|---|---|---|---|---|---|
| 2022 | SLAC | 6 | 1 | 16.3 | .750* | – | .250 | 5.0 | 0.2 | 0.2 | 1.4 | 6.4 |
| Career | | 6 | 1 | 16.3 | .750 | – | .250 | 5.0 | 0.2 | 0.2 | 1.4 | 6.4 |
