= Padiet Wang =

Basketball player

Personal information
- Born: January 13, 1998 (age 28) Beirut, Lebanon
- Listed height: 1.93 m (6 ft 4 in)
- Listed weight: 75 kg (165 lb)

Career information
- High school: Overland (Aurora, Colorado)
- College: UCCS (2016–2020)
- Playing career: 2020–2023
- Position: Point guard / shooting guard

Career history
- 2020: Bayer Giants Leverkusen
- 2021–2022: Académica Coimbra
- 2022: Cobra Sport
- 2022–2024: Surrey Scorchers

Padiet Wang (born January 13, 1998) is a South Sudanese-American former basketball player and a former member of the South Sudan national team. He received a lifetime ban from FIBA in 2025 for match fixing.

== Early life ==
Wang was born in Beirut, Lebanon, to South Sudanese parents. Around age 2, his family moved to the United States, settling in the state of Colorado. There, Wang picked up basketball in elementary school and started playing competitively in middle school. Growing up, he went to Denver Nuggets games.

Wang played for Overland High School and was a two-time Colorado 5A state champion. After graduating high school, he joined the University of Colorado Colorado Springs's basketball team in 2016.

== Professional career ==
In June 2020, amidst the COVID-19 pandemic, Wang signed for German club Bayer Giants Leverkusen of the ProA, the national second division.

Wang started his professional career in Portugal, playing for Académica Coimbra in the Liga Portuguesa de Basquetebol (LPB). He averaged 14.8 points for the team.

In April 2022, Wang played for Cobra Sport in the 2022 BAL season, the second season of the Basketball Africa League. He averaged 15.4 points (second on the team) and led Cobra in assists with 7 per game.

On August 11, 2022, Wang signed a one-year contract with the Surrey Scorchers of the British Basketball League (BBL). He resigned with the team for the 2023-2024 season. In March 2024, he played in the BBL All-Star game. On 18 April 2024, the Scorchers announced that Wang would miss the rest of the season for personal reasons. In 2025 he received a lifetime ban from FIBA for fixing matches while he was a member of the Scorchers.

== National team career ==
Wang represents the South Sudan men's national basketball team in international competitions. He played during the 2023 World Cup qualifiers and helped South Sudan qualify for their first-ever World Cup.
