= Mayan Kiir =

South Sudanese-American basketball player

Free agent
- Position: Power forward

Personal information
- Born: January 1, 1998 (age 28) South Sudan
- Listed height: 2.06 m (6 ft 9 in)
- Listed weight: 99 kg (218 lb)

Career information
- High school: Victory Rock Prep (Bradenton, Florida)
- College: LSU (2017–2018); South Florida (2018–2019); New Mexico State (2019–2021); Central Baptist College (2021–2022)
- NBA draft: 2022: undrafted
- Playing career: 2022–present

Career history
- 2022: Cobra Sport
- 2022: Westchester Knicks

Career highlights
- BAL rebounding leader (2022)

Mayan Keer Kiir (born 1 January 1998) is a South Sudanese-American professional basketball player who last played for the Westchester Knicks of the NBA G League.

== Early life and career ==
Kiir was born in South Sudan but fled the country when he was four, along with his mother and siblings, leaving his father behind who was fighting in the Second Sudanese Civil War.

The family moved to Melbourne, Australia, where Kiir started playing for the development team Longhorns where he was discovered by coach Manny Berberi. He then earned a scholarship to play high school basketball for Victory Rock Prep in Florida. He led his team in scoring and rebounding in his senior season.

== College career ==
Kiir played for LSU in his first college season, for South Florida in his second and after a transfer year he played for New Mexico State. He was also on the roster for Central Baptist College during the 2021–22 season and played his last game on January 13, 2022.

== Professional career ==
On April 9, 2022, Kiir made his professional debut with Cobra Sport in the Basketball Africa League (BAL). He had a double-double of 18 points and 22 rebounds in a loss to Zamalek, setting a league record for most rebounds in a game. Kiir averaged 18.8 points and a league-leading 11.2 rebounds in five games in the Nile Conference, as Cobra finished in the fifth place.

=== Westchester Knicks (2022) ===
On October 24, 2022, Kiir joined the Westchester Knicks training camp roster. He was picked by the Knicks in the 2022 NBA G League draft with the 15th overall pick, becoming the first BAL player to be selected in an NBA G League draft. However, he was waived on December 29.

== Personal ==
Kiir is the cousin of Mangok Mathiang, a professional basketball player who has played for the National Basketball Association (NBA) team Charlotte Hornets.

== BAL career statistics ==
Legend
| GP | Games played | GS | Games started | MPG | Minutes per game |
| FG% | Field goal percentage | 3P% | 3-point field goal percentage | FT% | Free throw percentage |
| RPG | Rebounds per game | APG | Assists per game | SPG | Steals per game |
| BPG | Blocks per game | PPG | Points per game | **Bold** | Career high |
| * | Led the league |

| Year | Team | GP | GS | MPG | FG% | 3P% | FT% | RPG | APG | SPG | BPG | PPG |
|---|---|---|---|---|---|---|---|---|---|---|---|---|
| 2022 | Cobra Sport | 5 | 5 | 29.4 | .474 | .278 | .586 | 11.2* | 2.2 | .8 | .8 | 18.8 |
| Career | | 5 | 5 | 29.4 | .474 | .278 | .586 | 11.2 | 2.2 | .8 | .8 | 18.8 |
