= JBC Basketball =

JBC
- League: Harare Basketball Association; BUZ National Championship
- Location: Harare, Zimbabwe
- President: Addison Chiware
- Head coach: Addison Chiware
- Championships: 6 BUZ National Championships

JBC is a Zimbabwean basketball team based in Harare. The team plays in the Harare Basketball Association (HBA) and has won a record of six BUZ National Championship titles. JBC plays in the Road to BAL in the 2023 tournament, becoming the second team from Zimbabwe to do so. In the first round, JBC won two out of three games to become the first Zimbabwean team to advance to the elite 16.

The club is owned by Addison Chiware, who is also JBC's president and head coach, as well as the president of the country's federation Basketball Union of Zimbabwe (BUZ).

The JBC is also known for winning multiple awards and have gone international in 2022.

== Honours ==
BUZ National Championship

- Champions (6): 2008, 2009, 2010, 2015, 2016, 2023

== Performance in the Road to BAL ==
Competition	Season	Coach	Won	Lost	Win %	Final stage	Top scorer
Road to BAL	2024	Addison Chiware	2	4	.333	Eliminated in Elite 16 group stage	Tafadzwa Tela (15.0 PPG)
Totals			2	4	.333	—	

== Players ==
=== Current roster ===
The following is JBC's roster in the 2024 BAL qualification, which was played in October 2023.

Note: Flags indicate national team eligibility at FIBA-sanctioned events. Players may hold other non-FIBA nationalities not displayed.

JBC roster
Players
Coaches

Pos.	No.	Nat.	Name	Ht.	Age
C	00	(United States)	Byers, Tyjhai	2.11 m (6 ft 11 in)	27 – 1 April 1998
PF	5	(Zimbabwe)	Muratu, Tadisa	1.96 m (6 ft 5 in)	19 – 20 November 2005
SG	6	(Zimbabwe)	Pote, Kudakwashe	1.75 m (5 ft 9 in)	31 – 8 June 1994
SF	7	(Zimbabwe)	Phiri, Saul	1.96 m (6 ft 5 in)	28 – 23 March 1997
SF	8	(Zimbabwe)	Penduka, Noah Jotham	1.91 m (6 ft 3 in)	29 – 30 November 1995
SG	10	(Zimbabwe)	Chidzomba, Munyaradzi	1.90 m (6 ft 3 in)	24 – 16 July 2001
PF	12	(Zimbabwe)	Nyatanga, Benson	1.93 m (6 ft 4 in)	34 – 4 September 1991
PG	14	(Zimbabwe)	Pfachi, Dyvonne	1.89 m (6 ft 2 in)	30 – 9 May 1995
PF	15	(Zimbabwe)	Zhomwa, Innocent	1.94 m (6 ft 4 in)	26 – 20 April 1999
SF	30	(Zimbabwe)	Changara, Rolland Kudakwashe	1.75 m (5 ft 9 in)	30 – 13 September 1995
PF	33	(Zimbabwe)	Zamani, Takutdzwa	1.96 m (6 ft 5 in)	30 – 4 August 1995
C	34	(Zimbabwe)	Chiimba, Tashinga	1.98 m (6 ft 6 in)	23 – 22 November 2001

Head coach

- (Zimbabwe) Addison Chiware

Assistant coach(es)

- (Zimbabwe) Johnson Shumba
- (United States) Craig Lambert

Legend

- (C) Team captain
- Injured

- Roster
Updated: 22 October 2023
