= Mercenaries (basketball) =

- Leagues: Manicaland Basketball Association
- Founded: 2004; 21 years ago
- Location: Mutare, Zimbabwe
- Team colors
- Head coach: Innocent Sithole
- Championships: 1 National Championship; 13 Manicaland League
Home

Mercenaries is a basketball club based in Mutare, Zimbabwe. Since 2006, the team has competed in the Manicaland Basketball Association (MBA), winning a league championship in each season.

== History ==
Mercenaries was founded in 2004 by a group of friends from Mutare, led by Innocent Sithole, who hoped to make money playing together in basketball tournaments. In 2006, the club joined the Manicaland Basketball Association (MBA). Since then, it has won 13 consecutive league titles without losing a single game.

In 2019, Mercenaries won its first National Basketball Club Championship, becoming the first team from outside Harare and Bulawayo to do so.

== Honours ==
Zimbabwe National Championship

- Champions (1): 2019

Manicaland Basketball Association

- Champions (13): 2007, 2008, 2009, 2010, 2011, 2012, 2013, 2014, 2015, 2016, 2017, 2018, 2019

== In African competitions ==
BAL Qualifiers (1 appearance)

2020 – First Round

== Personnel ==
=== Current roster ===
The following is the Mercenaries roster for the 2020 BAL Qualifying Tournaments:

Note: Flags indicate national team eligibility at FIBA-sanctioned events. Players may hold other non-FIBA nationalities not displayed.

Mercenaries roster
Players
Coaches

Pos.	No.	Nat.	Name
	2	(Zimbabwe)	Jumburu, Timothy
PG	5	(Zimbabwe)	Chitsinde, Tawanda
G	8	(Zimbabwe)	Njovo, Tinashe
	10	(Zimbabwe)	Muchakubvura, Peterson
	11	(Zimbabwe)	Sanyatwe, Trevor-Joe
	12	(Zimbabwe)	Sithole, Innocent
	14	(Zimbabwe)	Pfachi, Dyvonne
C	15	(Zimbabwe)	Chivanganye, Neville
SG	21	(Zimbabwe)	Maturure, Tatenda
	23	(Zimbabwe)	Dowera, Tanaka
	35	(Zimbabwe)	Tswatswa, Tatenda

Head coach

- (Zimbabwe) Innocent Sithole

Legend

- (C) Team captain
- Injured

- Roster
Updated: 2 November 2019

=== Notable players ===
Note: Flags indicate national team eligibility at FIBA-sanctioned events. Players may hold other non-FIBA nationalities not displayed.

Criteria

To appear in this section a player must have either:

- Set a club record or won an individual award while at the club
- Played at least one official international match for their national team at any time
- Played at least one official NBA match at any time.

- (Zimbabwe) Tatenda Maturure
