= New Star BBC =

Basketball team in Burundi

New Star
- Nickname: Les Rouge-Noirs (The Red-Blacks)
- League: Burundian Championship
- Founded: 2002
- Location: Bujumbura, Burundi
- President: Ildephonse Nahimana
- Vice-president: Yannick Chokola Shang
- Head coach: Christian Nshimirimana
- Team captain: Gaël Nijimbere
- Championships: 2007, 2008, 2013, 2018, 2021
Home

New Star Basketball Club is a Burundian basketball club. The team plays in the National League of Burundi, and has won the championship in 2021. One of New Stars' most notable players has been Guibert Nijimbere.

== Basketball Africa League ==
New Star qualified for the 2022 BAL Qualifying Tournaments. There, New Star won its first four games. The winning streak was finally stopped in the semi-finals by South Sudan's Cobra Sport who won the decisive match 78-76.

== Honours ==
Burundian Championship

- Champions: 2007, 2008, 2013, 2018, 2021

== In African competitions ==
BAL Qualifiers (1 appearance)

2022 – Fourth Place

== Players ==
=== Current roster ===
The following is the New Star BBC roster for the second round of the 2022 BAL qualification.

Note: Flags indicate national team eligibility at FIBA-sanctioned events. Players may hold other non-FIBA nationalities not displayed.

New Star BBC roster
Players
Coaches

Pos.	No.	Nat.	Name	Ht.	Age
PG	4	(Burundi)	Nijimbere, Guibert	1.86 m (6 ft 1 in)	30 – 1 January 1995
PG	5	(Burundi)	Ngenzahayo, Malick	1.76 m (5 ft 9 in)	28 – 21 October 1996
PF	6	(Burundi)	Ishimwe, Clovis	1.87 m (6 ft 2 in)	24 – 16 November 2000
SF	8	(Burundi)	Nsabimana, Hervé	1.85 m (6 ft 1 in)	28 – 13 October 1997
SG	9	(Burundi)	Kabura, Rodrigue	1.87 m (6 ft 2 in)	32 – 21 May 1993
PF	10	(Kenya)	Ereng, Paul (I)	2.08 m (6 ft 10 in)	29 – 10 July 1996
SG	11	(Rwanda)	Gasana, Kenny (I)	1.90 m (6 ft 3 in)	40 – 9 November 1984
SF	12	(Burundi)	Ndikumana, Landry	1.98 m (6 ft 6 in)	30 – 14 February 1995
C	13	(Burundi)	Ndagijimana, Oly	2.10 m (6 ft 11 in)	26 – 30 September 1999
C	14	(United States)	Blakeney, George (I)	2.06 m (6 ft 9 in)	34 – 30 July 1991
PF	15	(Spain)	Calvo Masa, Álvaro (I)	2.01 m (6 ft 7 in)	42 – 27 March 1983

Head coach

- (Burundi) Patrick Ngwijuruvugo

Assistant coach(es)

- (Burundi) Christian Nshimirimana

Legend

- (C) Team captain
- (I) Import player
- Injured

- Roster
Updated: December 18, 2021

=== Notable players ===
- (Burundi) Guibert Nijimbere (3 years: 2014–2017)
