= Tom Wamukota =

Kenyan basketball player (born 1993)

No. 14 – APR
- Position: Center
- League: Rwanda Basketball League

Personal information
- Born: 28 September 1993 (age 33) Bungoma, Kenya
- Listed height: 2.11 m (6 ft 11 in)
- Listed weight: 105 kg (231 lb)

Career information
- College: Wiley (2012–2013); Kilgore (2013–2014); Wichita State (2014–2016)
- NBA draft: 2016: undrafted
- Playing career: 2016–present

Career history
- 2016–2017: PAEEK
- 2017–2018: Eko Kings
- 2018: Águilas Doradas de Durango
- 2018–2019: MAS Fes
- 2019–2020: US Monastir
- 2020: JS Kairouan
- 2020–2022: Patriots
- 2021–2022: Cobra Sport
- 2022–present: APR

Career highlights
- 2× NBL / RBL champion (2020, 2023); NBL Rwanda Best Center (2021)
Medals
Men's basketball
Representing Kenya
FIBA AfroCan
Silver medal – second place	2019 Mali

Tom "Bush" Wamukota (born 28 September 1993) is a Kenyan professional basketball player for APR of the Rwanda Basketball League. He has played for the Kenya national team.

== High school ==
Wamukota started his basketball career in high school, playing for his school, Maseno School, then coached by Paul Otula.

== College career ==
Wamukota played two years with the Wichita State Shockers men's basketball team. He was the first Kenyan player to ever play in the Sweet 16 of the NCAA tournament.

== Professional career ==
In the summer of 2018, he played for Águilas Doradas de Durango in Mexico. In the 2018–19 season, he played with Moroccan club MAS Fes.

In 2019, Wamukota played in Tunisia for US Monastir and later JS Kairouan.

In September 2020, Wamukota joined Rwandan side Patriots BBC. He won the national championship later that year, before extended his contract until 2023 in January.

In December 2021, Wamukota joined South Sudanese club Cobra Sport to strengthen the team for the second round of the 2022 BAL qualification. He was on Cobra Sport's roster for the primary BAL tournament, however, he was unable to play due to injury.

In 2022, Wamukota rejoined Patriots BBC for the Rwandan domestic league. He was named in the 2022 All Star Team.

In December 2022, Wamukota signed a one-year contract for APR. On May 4, 2024, Wamukota made his debut in the Basketball Africa League (BAL) with one point and four rebounds in an overtime win against US Monastir.

== National team career ==
Wamukota plays with the Kenya national basketball team and has represented the team at AfroCan 2019, where have averaged 10.5 points. He was named to the tournament's All-Star Five.

He has been part of Kenya's national team at the AfroBasket 2021 in Kigali, Rwanda.

== BAL career statistics ==
Legend
GP	Games played	GS	Games started	MPG	Minutes per game
FG%	Field goal percentage	3P%	3-point field goal percentage	FT%	Free throw percentage
RPG	Rebounds per game	APG	Assists per game	SPG	Steals per game
BPG	Blocks per game	PPG	Points per game	**Bold**	Career high

Year	Team	GP	GS	MPG	FG%	3P%	FT%	RPG	APG	SPG	BPG	PPG
2021	Patriots	6	3	21.8	.213	.143	.500	6.3	1.2	0.5	0.3	4.2
2024	APR	5	0	8.4	.125	.000	.500	2.6	0.4	0.2	0.0	0.8
