= Brice Eyaga Bidias =

Cameroonian basketball player

No. 26 – SLUC Nancy Basket
- Position: Power forward / center
- League: LNB Élite

Personal information
- Born: 26 November 1998 (age 27) Yaoundé, Cameroon
- Listed height: 2.04 m (6 ft 8 in)
- Listed weight: 100 kg (220 lb)

Career information
- Playing career: 2018–present

Career history
- 2018–2019: Condor
- 2019: Manga BB
- 2019–2022: FAP
- 2023–2024: Saint-Médard en Jalles
- 2024–2026: JA Vichy
- 2026–present: SLUC Nancy Basket

Career highlights
- BAL All-Defensive Team (2022); 3× Elite Messieurs champion (2020–2022)

Brice Dieudonne Eyaga Bidias (born 26 November 1998) is a Cameroonian professional basketball player for SLUC Nancy Basket of the LNB Élite and the Cameroon national team.

== Professional career ==
After playing at the junior levels, Eyaga Bidias joined Condor of the Ligue de Basketball du Centre (LBC) in 2018.

In the fall of 2019, Eyaga Bidias played with the Gabonese club Manga BB in the 2021 BAL qualification games. In the following year, he joined FAP and was on the roster for the inaugural season of the Basketball Africa League but did not appear in any game.

In the following season, the 2022 season, Eyaga had a break-out season as he helped FAP reach the BAL semi-finals by averaging 11 points and a team-high 6.5 rebounds per game. On 27 May, he was named to the BAL All-Defensive Team.

In 2023, Eyaga left Cameroon for France to play for Saint-Médard en Jalles in the Nationale Masculine 3 2023–24 season. On 10 June 2024, he signed with JA Vichy of the LNB Pro B.

== National team career ==
Eyaga Bidias played with the Cameroon national basketball team. He was on the preliminary squad for AfroBasket 2021, but was cut before the start of the tournament. He later played in the qualifiers for the 2023 World Cup. Bidias also played at AfroBasket 2025.

== Career statistics ==
Legend
GP	Games played	GS	Games started	MPG	Minutes per game
FG%	Field goal percentage	3P%	3-point field goal percentage	FT%	Free throw percentage
RPG	Rebounds per game	APG	Assists per game	SPG	Steals per game
BPG	Blocks per game	PPG	Points per game	**Bold**	Career high

=== BAL ===
Year	Team	GP	GS	MPG	FG%	3P%	FT%	RPG	APG	SPG	BPG	PPG
2022	FAP	8	8	28.2	.408	.222	.571	6.5	1.5	1.0	1.0	11.0
