= Cobra Sport =

- Nickname: CSC
- Conference: Nile
- Leagues: CESBA; Basketball Africa League
- Founded: 2017
- History: Cobra Sport; 2017–present
- Arena: Dr. Biar Sports Complex
- Location: Juba, South Sudan
- General manager: Ajak Biar Deng
- Head coach: Manny Berberi
- Championships: 3 South Sudanese Leagues; 1 Manute Bol Cup
Home	Away

Cobra Sports Club, commonly known as Cobra Sport, are a South Sudanese basketball team based in Juba, South Sudan. The team was established in 2017 and plays in the Central Equatoria State Basketball Association (CESBA). Cobra has won three national championships.

Cobra played in the Basketball Africa League (BAL) during the 2022 season as the first team from South Sudan in league history.

== History ==
The sports club was founded in 2014 by Biardit Company Limited. The basketball team was established in 2017.

=== Basketball Africa League ===
In 2020, Cobra played in its first continental games when it participated in the qualifiers for the 2020 BAL season. Cobra played in Group F in Antananarivo and ended in third place, missing out on advancing to the next round. However, the club advanced with a wild card before losing all next three games in the Elite 16 stage.

On 20 September 2021, Cobra signed John Jevish Omondi from Kenya as their new head coach. The team played in the 2022 BAL qualification for a second straight season. In the first round, the team lost both its games but managed to advance with a wild card given by FIBA. Ahead of the second round, the team acquired Kenyan international Tom Wamukota and Rwandan international Dieudonné Ndizeye. With its strengthened roster, Cobra managed to advance to the semi-finals after defeating Ulinzi Warriors in the second round. On December 10, 2021, Cobra defeated New Star and claimed a spot in the regular season of the 2022 BAL season. The team became the first-ever team from South Sudan to qualify for the BAL.

== Honours ==
CESBA

- Champions (3): 2018, 2019, 2021–22

The NBA Legend Manute Bol Cup

- Winners (1): 2019

== In the Basketball Africa League ==
Season	Road to BAL				Main competition		
Season	W	L	Result	Qualified	W	L	Result
2021	2	5	Elite 16	No	DNQ		
2022	2	4	Silver	Yes	1	4	Group Phase
2023	Withdrew				DNQ		
Total	4	9	1/1		1	4	

== Players ==
=== Current roster ===
The following is the Cobra Sport 13-man roster for the 2022 BAL season group phase:

Note: Flags indicate national team eligibility at FIBA-sanctioned events. Players may hold other non-FIBA nationalities not displayed.

Cobra Sport roster
Players
Coaches

Pos.	No.	Nat.	Name	Ht.	Age
PG	00	(South Sudan)	Dieu, Gatwang	1.84 m (6 ft 0 in)	22 – 1 January 2003
PF	1	(South Sudan)	Kiir, Mayan	2.06 m (6 ft 9 in)	27 – 1 January 1998
SF	2	(South Sudan)	Wek, Nyang	1.98 m (6 ft 6 in)	29 – 6 March 1996
G	5	(South Sudan)	Wang, Padiet	1.93 m (6 ft 4 in)	27 – 13 January 1998
PG	10	(United States)	Harrington, Jared (I)	1.96 m (6 ft 5 in)	28 – 23 April 1997
PF	11	(South Sudan)	Lado, Alex (C)	2.01 m (6 ft 7 in)	30 – 13 May 1995
PF	14	(South Sudan)	Deng, David	2.04 m (6 ft 8 in)	24 – 25 June 2000
C	21	(United States)	Hampton, Leon (I)	2.13 m (7 ft 0 in)	30 – 13 June 1995
F	23	(South Sudan)	Malual, Malual	1.87 m (6 ft 2 in)	24 – 30 July 2000
C	24	(South Sudan)	Maluach, Khaman (E)	2.13 m (7 ft 0 in)	18 – 14 September 2006
C	34	(South Sudan)	Akuei, Lual	2.08 m (6 ft 10 in)	34 – 12 January 1991
C		(Kenya)	Wamukota, Tom (injured) (I)	2.13 m (7 ft 0 in)	31 – 8 September 1993

Head coach

- (South Sudan) Manny Berberi

Assistant coach(es)

- (Kenya) John Omondi
- (South Sudan) Majak Kou

Legend

- (C) Team captain
- (I) Import player
- (E): BAL Elevate player
- Injured

- Roster
Updated: April 9, 2022

=== Notable players ===
Note: Flags indicate national team eligibility at FIBA-sanctioned events. Players may hold other non-FIBA nationalities not displayed.

Criteria

To appear in this section a player must have either:

- Set a club record or won an individual award while at the club
- Played at least one official international match for their national team at any time
- Played at least one official NBA match at any time.

- (South Sudan) Tony Marino Anthony
- (South Sudan) Samir Loduo
- (South Sudan) Khaman Maluach
- (South Sudan) Alex Tombe
- (South Sudan) Nyang Wek
- (Kenya) Tom Wamukota
- (Rwanda) Dieudonné Ndizeye
