= 2022 BAL season rosters =

This page lists the rosters of the 2022 BAL season, the inaugural season of the Basketball Africa League (BAL). Each team features 13 players. On the rosters, a maximum of four foreign players is allowed including maximum two non-African players. One player from the BAL Elevate program, a cooperation with the NBA Academy Africa, is placed on each team.

== Sahara Conference ==
=== AS Salé ===
Abdelali Lahrichi and Ousmane Drame were added ahead of the playoffs.

Note: Flags indicate national team eligibility at FIBA-sanctioned events. Players may hold other non-FIBA nationalities not displayed.

AS Salé roster
Players
Coaches

Pos.	No.	Nat.	Name	Ht.	Age
SG	1	(Morocco)	Allal, Chems Eddine	1.96 m (6 ft 5 in)	25 – 15 February 2000
PG	2	(Morocco)	El Masbahi, Zakaria (C)	1.93 m (6 ft 4 in)	46 – 29 March 1979
F/C	4	(Morocco)	Najah, Abderrahim	1.98 m (6 ft 6 in)	41 – 20 November 1984
PG	5	(Morocco)	El Madini, Abdelmajid	1.80 m (5 ft 11 in)	27 – 18 May 1998
C	6	(Morocco)	Kourdou, Soufiane	2.11 m (6 ft 11 in)	40 – 21 May 1985
SG	10	(Niger)	Harouna, Abdoulaye (AI)	1.96 m (6 ft 5 in)	34 – 12 February 1992
G	11	(Morocco)	Bennis, Nadir (E)	1.90 m (6 ft 3 in)	22 – 8 November 2003
F/C	15	(Spain)	Calvo Masa, Álvaro (WI)	2.03 m (6 ft 8 in)	42 – 27 March 1983
PF	23	(Morocco)	Jaddi, Hamza	1.99 m (6 ft 6 in)	32 – 25 August 1993
PF	24	(Morocco)	Chaoui Kouraichi, Mohammed	2.04 m (6 ft 8 in)	26 – 10 September 1999
CG	28	(Morocco)	Lahrichi, Abdelali	1.91 m (6 ft 3 in)	32 – 19 July 1993
PF	34	(Morocco)	Azouga, Badreddine	2.04 m (6 ft 8 in)	31 – 7 February 1995
CG	41	(United States)	Stoglin, Terrell (WI)	1.85 m (6 ft 1 in)	34 – 10 November 1991
C	42	(Guinea)	Drame, Ousmane (AI)	2.06 m (6 ft 9 in)	32 – 15 December 1993
PF	50	(Morocco)	Boukichou, Khalid	2.08 m (6 ft 10 in)	33 – 17 September 1992

Head coach

- (Australia) Liz Mills

Legend

- (C) Team captain
- (E): BAL Elevate player
- (WI): World import
- (AI): African import
- Injured

- Roster
Updated: May 20, 2022

=== DUC ===
DUC Dakar roster
Players
Coaches

Pos.	No.	Nat.	Name	Ht.	Wt.	Age
G	00	(Senegal)	Niang, Thierno	1.85 m (6 ft 1 in)	93 kg (205 lb)	35 – 18 March 1990
G	1	(United States)	Ali, Hameed (WI)	1.88 m (6 ft 2 in)	82 kg (181 lb)	32 – 26 August 1993
SG	2	(Senegal)	Diallo, Bamba	1.91 m (6 ft 3 in)	77 kg (170 lb)	29 – 15 March 1996
G	5	(Senegal)	Bâ, Bassirou	1.88 m (6 ft 2 in)		29 – 18 August 1996
PF	7	(Democratic Republic of the Congo)	Lufile, Chadrack (AI)	2.06 m (6 ft 9 in)	120 kg (265 lb)	35 – 11 September 1990
PG	10	(Senegal)	Faye, Cheikh	1.94 m (6 ft 4 in)		24 – 7 December 2001
C	11	(Senegal)	Diop, Abel (C)			24 – 27 December 2001
F	12	(Senegal)	Gomis, Saint Cristophe	2.00 m (6 ft 7 in)		27 – 16 August 1998
PG	14	(Ivory Coast)	Sie, Abraham (AI)	1.80 m (5 ft 11 in)	88 kg (194 lb)	26 – 31 August 1999
F	15	(Senegal)	Sane, Babacar (E)	2.02 m (6 ft 8 in)		22 – 13 September 2003
SF	23	(France)	Aboudou, Jordan (WI)	2.01 m (6 ft 7 in)	95 kg (209 lb)	35 – 30 January 1991
C	28	(Senegal)	Diakhite, Adama	2.06 m (6 ft 9 in)		28 – 12 April 1997
PF/C	45	(Senegal)	Badji, Mamadou	2.05 m (6 ft 9 in)		27 – 29 July 1998

Head coach

- (Senegal) Parfait Adjivon

Assistant coach(es)

- (Senegal) Khardiata Diop
- (Senegal) Malick Ndiaye

Legend

- (C) Team captain
- (E): BAL Elevate player
- (WI): World import
- (AI): African import
- Injured

- Roster
Updated: 5 March 2022

=== US Monastir ===
From the past season, six players returned for their second BAL season. On May 11, Monastir signed Julius Coles Jr. ahead of the playoffs.

US Monastir roster
Players
Coaches

Pos.	No.	Nat.	Name	Ht.	Age
G	00	(Georgia (country))	Dixon, Michael (WI)	1.85 m (6 ft 1 in)	35 – 1 December 1990
SG	1	(Tunisia)	Marnaoui, Oussama	1.93 m (6 ft 4 in)	26 – 16 June 1999
SG	2	(Tunisia)	Jaziri, Naji	1.89 m (6 ft 2 in)	31 – 21 October 1994
G	5	(United States)	Coles Jr., Julius (WI)	1.96 m (6 ft 5 in)	37 – 15 January 1989
PG	10	(Ivory Coast)	Diabate, Mouloukou (AI)	1.83 m (6 ft 0 in)	38 – 21 July 1987
PG	11	(Tunisia)	Mahemli, Houssem	1.90 m (6 ft 3 in)	26 – 14 February 2000
G	12	(Cameroon)	Onana Awana, Charles Loic (E)	2.00 m (6 ft 7 in)	22 – 15 December 2003
C	13	(South Sudan)	Majok, Ater (AI)	2.08 m (6 ft 10 in)	38 – 4 July 1987
F	15	(Tunisia)	Methnani, Wassef	1.98 m (6 ft 6 in)	27 – 7 August 1998
SF	23	(Tunisia)	Lahyani, Firas	2.01 m (6 ft 7 in)	34 – 19 July 1991
C	24	(Tunisia)	Abbassi, Mohamed	2.02 m (6 ft 8 in)	34 – 28 March 1991
G/F	26	(Tunisia)	Ghyaza, Mokhtar	2.05 m (6 ft 9 in)	39 – 15 November 1986
F	28	(Tunisia)	Rassil, Mohamed	2.01 m (6 ft 7 in)	28 – 3 February 1998
F	45	(Tunisia)	Slimane, Radhouane (C)	2.05 m (6 ft 9 in)	45 – 16 August 1980

Head coach

- (Serbia) Miodrag Perišić

Assistant coach(es)

- (Tunisia) Zied Kechaou

Legend

- (C) Team captain
- (I) Import player
- (E): BAL Elevate player
- (WI): World import
- (AI): African import
- Injured

- Roster
Updated: March 5, 2022

==== In ====
Player	Club
(Georgia (country)) Michael Dixon	(Poland) Wilki Morskie Szczecin
(Ivory Coast) Mouloukou Diabate	(Egypt) Zamalek
(Tunisia) Mohamed Rassil	(Tunisia) ES Sahel
(Tunisia) Mohamed Abbassi	(Tunisia) Ezzahra Sports
(Cameroon) Charles Loic Onana Awana	(Senegal) NBA Academy Africa
(United States) Julius Coles Jr.	(Qatar) Al-Wakrah

Teams in italics also play in the 2022 BAL season.

==== Out ====
Player	Club
(Tunisia) Makrem Ben Romdhane	(Portugal) Benfica
(Tunisia) Omar Abada	(Saudi Arabia) Al-Ittihad Jeddah
(United States) Chris Crawford	(Guinea) SLAC
(Tunisia) Mourad El Mabrouk	(Tunisia) ES Radès
(Tunisia) Eskander Bhouri	(Tunisia) Club Africain
(Lebanon) Wael Arakji	(Kuwait) Al-Jahra

=== Ferroviário da Beira ===
Note: Flags indicate national team eligibility at FIBA-sanctioned events. Players may hold other non-FIBA nationalities not displayed.

Ferroviário da Beira roster
Players
Coaches

Pos.	No.	Nat.	Name	Ht.	Age
SF	4	(Canada)	Kennedy, Jermelle (I)	1.94 m (6 ft 4 in)	36 – 19 September 1989
PF	5	(Mozambique)	Baptista, Armando (C)	2.00 m (6 ft 7 in)	40 – 2 June 1985
SF	6	(Mozambique)	Novela, Orlando	1.85 m (6 ft 1 in)	34 – 20 February 1991
G	8	(Mozambique)	Nurmamade, Ismael	1.85 m (6 ft 1 in)	34 – 3 December 1991
PG	10	(Mozambique)	Novela, Ermelindo	1.85 m (6 ft 1 in)	34 – 20 February 1991
F	11	(Mozambique)	Houana, Elves	1.93 m (6 ft 4 in)	38 – 18 August 1987
PG	12	(United States)	Perry, Will (I)	1.83 m (6 ft 0 in)	32 – 11 October 1993
PF	13	(Mozambique)	Ubisse, Helton	2.01 m (6 ft 7 in)	31 – 31 January 1995
PG	15	(Mozambique)	Senda, Alberto	1.85 m (6 ft 1 in)	28 – 2 January 1998
F	17	(Mozambique)	Munguambe, Ayad	1.97 m (6 ft 6 in)	29 – 29 June 1996
PF	23	(Mozambique)	Zandamela, Egidio	2.03 m (6 ft 8 in)	30 – 13 April 1995
C	34	(Nigeria)	Orizu, Prince (I)	2.08 m (6 ft 10 in)	31 – 10 August 1994

Head coach

- (Spain) Luis Lopes Hernandez

Assistant coach(es)

- Amarildo Taquidir
- Edilson Alfredo Givandas

Legend

- (C) Team captain
- (I) Import player
- Injured

- Roster
Updated: March 2, 2022

=== SLAC ===
SLAC acquired two players with previous BAL experience, as Chris Crawford played (US Monastir) and Josh Nzeakor (AS Police) appeared in the 2021 season. Crawford left the team after the group phase; Oumar Barry and Malcolm Griffin joined the team ahead of the playoffs.

SLAC roster
Players
Coaches

Pos.	No.	Nat.	Name	Ht.	Age
PG	1	(Guinea)	Sankhon, Mbembah	1.77 m (5 ft 10 in)	31 – 2 February 1995
SG	2	(United States)	Crawford, Chris (WI)	2.00 m (6 ft 7 in)	28 – 13 March 1997
C	4	(Nigeria)	Obekpa, Chris (AI)	2.06 m (6 ft 9 in)	32 – 14 November 1993
PF	5	(Guinea)	Sidibe, Djibril	2.06 m (6 ft 9 in)	25 – 27 November 2000
SF	6	(Guinea)	Mara, Dioumba	1.97 m (6 ft 6 in)	32 – 15 October 1993
SG	10	(Guinea)	Keita, Mamadi (C)	1.87 m (6 ft 2 in)	37 – 10 March 1988
PF	11	(United States)	Miller Jr., Dane (WI)	2.03 m (6 ft 8 in)	35 – 10 May 1990
PG	12	(Senegal)	Mbaye, Serigne (E)	1.87 m (6 ft 2 in)	22 – 4 April 2003
SF	13	(Guinea)	Camara, Aboubacar	1.98 m (6 ft 6 in)	25 – 26 October 2000
F	14	(Guinea)	Doumbouya, Sory	1.96 m (6 ft 5 in)	25 – 30 October 2000
PF	15	(Guinea)	Diallo, Bachir Bella	1.98 m (6 ft 6 in)	30 – 3 May 1995
C	21	(Guinea)	Barry, Oumar	2.11 m (6 ft 11 in)	29 – 2 September 1996
G	21	(United States)	Griffin, Malcolm (WI)	1.93 m (6 ft 4 in)	34 – 10 August 1991
PF/C	23	(Nigeria)	Nzeakor, Josh (AI)	2.06 m (6 ft 9 in)	28 – 13 June 1997
CG	24	(Guinea)	Fofana, Ibrahim	1.96 m (6 ft 5 in)	27 – 24 June 1998
PG	28	(Guinea)	Kaba, Alpha	1.80 m (5 ft 11 in)	21 – 27 February 2004
F	34	(Guinea)	Keita, Mohamed	2.08 m (6 ft 10 in)	22 – 20 March 2003

Head coach

- (Serbia) Željko Zečević

Assistant coach(es)

- (Egypt) Mohamed Elberns

Legend

- (C) Team captain
- (I) Import player
- (E): BAL Elevate player
- (WI): World import
- (AI): African import
- Injured

- Roster
Updated: 20 May 2022

==== Transactions ====
Teams in italics also play in the 2022 BAL season.

===== In =====
Player	Club	Date
(Guinea) Serigne Mbaye	(Senegal) NBA Academy Africa	March 2022
(Nigeria) Josh Nzeakor	(United States) Memphis Hustle	March 2022
(Guinea) Omar Barry	(Spain) Cornellà	May 2022 (for the 2022 BAL Playoffs)
(United States) Malcolm Griffin	(Greece) PAOK	May 2022 (for the 2022 BAL Playoffs)

===== Out =====
Player	Club	Date
(United States) Chris Crawford	(Syria) Al Wahda Damascus	17 May

=== REG ===
In May, Kenny Gasana and Abdoulaye N'Doye joined the team ahead of the playoffs; they replaced Pitchou Kambuy Manga and Store Habimana as active players on the roster.

REG BBC roster
Players
Coaches

Pos.	No.	Nat.	Name	Ht.	Age
PG	0	(Rwanda)	Filer, Adonis	1.88 m (6 ft 2 in)	32 – 11 July 1993
G	1	(Rwanda)	Vandriessche, Pierre	1.94 m (6 ft 4 in)	25 – 21 July 2000
SF	2	(Rwanda)	Ndizeye, Dieudonné	1.98 m (6 ft 6 in)	29 – 14 October 1996
G	5	(United States)	Thomas, Cleveland (WI)	1.93 m (6 ft 4 in)	32 – 2 December 1993
SG	10	(Rwanda)	Shyaka, Olivier	1.98 m (6 ft 6 in)	30 – 14 August 1995
PG	11	(Rwanda)	Nshobozwabyosenumukiza, Wilson	1.83 m (6 ft 0 in)	27 – 26 July 1998
PG	12	(Nigeria)	Ighovodja, Joy (E)	1.90 m (6 ft 3 in)	21 – 12 October 2004
C	13	(Rwanda)	Kaje, Elie (C)	1.90 m (6 ft 3 in)	30 – 17 March 1995
G	15	(Rwanda)	Habimana, Ntore	1.96 m (6 ft 5 in)	28 – 15 August 1997
F/C	21	(Rwanda)	Mpoyo, Axel	2.01 m (6 ft 7 in)	29 – 5 January 1997
G	23	(Rwanda)	Gasana, Kenny	1.90 m (6 ft 3 in)	41 – 9 November 1984
CG	24	(France)	N'Doye, Abdoulaye (WI)	1.99 m (6 ft 6 in)	27 – 9 March 1998
F/C	28	(Rwanda)	Kabange, Kami	2.03 m (6 ft 8 in)	41 – 2 July 1984
C	34	(Democratic Republic of the Congo)	Kambuy Manga, Pitchou (AI)	2.08 m (6 ft 10 in)	37 – 12 December 1988
C	41	(United States)	Walker, Anthony (WI)	2.06 m (6 ft 9 in)	32 – 22 July 1993

Head coach

- (United States) Robert Pack

Assistant coach(es)

- (Tanzania) Henry Mwinuka
- (Rwanda) Maxime Mwiseneza

Legend

- (C) Team captain
- (I) Import player
- (E): BAL Elevate player
- (WI): World import
- (AI): African import
- Injured

- Roster
Updated: May 20, 2022

== Nile Conference ==
=== Cape Town Tigers ===
The following is the Cape Town Tigers roster for the group phase of the 2022 BAL season. On May 4, Cleanthony Early joined Cape Town for the playoffs.

Note: Flags indicate national team eligibility at FIBA-sanctioned events. Players may hold other non-FIBA nationalities not displayed.

Cape Town Tigers roster
Players
Coaches

Pos.	No.	Nat.	Name	Ht.	Age
SG	00	(South Africa)	Myburgh, Ben	1.92 m (6 ft 4 in)	28 – 26 October 1997
F	1	(Central African Republic)	Ganapamo, Evans (AI)	2.01 m (6 ft 7 in)	31 – 19 August 1994
G	2	(Democratic Republic of the Congo)	Kabongo, Myck (I)	1.90 m (6 ft 3 in)	34 – 12 January 1992
CG	6	(South Africa)	Festile, Nkosinathi	1.75 m (5 ft 9 in)	32 – 15 July 1993
G	10	(South Africa)	Selepe, Lebesa	1.90 m (6 ft 3 in)	34 – 13 March 1991
G	11	(South Africa)	Mofokeng, Lebohang	1.94 m (6 ft 4 in)	33 – 24 July 1992
G/F	12	(South Africa)	Lunnemann, Igor	1.93 m (6 ft 4 in)	24 – 29 May 2001
PG	13	(South Africa)	Tholo, Lehlogonolo	1.83 m (6 ft 0 in)	33 – 12 November 1992
PF	14	(South Africa)	Sibanyoni, Nkosinathi	2.06 m (6 ft 9 in)	27 – 24 May 1998
SG	15	(United States)	Artis, Jamel (WI)	2.01 m (6 ft 7 in)	33 – 12 January 1993
F	21	(Senegal)	Diop, Matar (E)	2.03 m (6 ft 8 in)	22 – 15 January 2004
C	23	(United States)	Preston, Billy (WI)	2.08 m (6 ft 10 in)	28 – 26 October 1997
SF	24	(United States)	Early, Cleanthony (WI)	2.03 m (6 ft 8 in)	34 – 17 April 1991
C	34	(South Africa)	Reid, Liam	2.06 m (6 ft 9 in)	27 – 3 October 1998
C	41	(South Africa)	Prinsloo, Pieter (C)	2.08 m (6 ft 10 in)	34 – 7 January 1992
SG	45	(South Africa)	Williams, Matthew		24 – 3 November 2001

Head coach

- (South Africa) Relton Booysen

Assistant coach(es)

- (United States) Raphael Edwards
- (South Africa) Vincent Ntunja
- (United States) Al Harrington

Legend

- (C) Team captain
- (DC) Dual citizenship
- (I) Import player
- (E): BAL Elevate player
- (WI): World import
- (AI): African import
- Injured

- Roster
Updated: May 26, 2022

=== Cobra Sport ===
Cobra Sport roster
Players
Coaches

Pos.	No.	Nat.	Name	Ht.	Age
PG	00	(South Sudan)	Dieu, Gatwang	1.84 m (6 ft 0 in)	23 – 1 January 2003
PF	1	(South Sudan)	Kiir, Mayan	2.06 m (6 ft 9 in)	28 – 1 January 1998
SF	2	(South Sudan)	Wek, Nyang	1.98 m (6 ft 6 in)	29 – 6 March 1996
G	5	(South Sudan)	Wang, Padiet	1.93 m (6 ft 4 in)	28 – 13 January 1998
PG	10	(United States)	Harrington, Jared (I)	1.96 m (6 ft 5 in)	28 – 23 April 1997
PF	11	(South Sudan)	Lado, Alex (C)	2.01 m (6 ft 7 in)	30 – 13 May 1995
PF	14	(South Sudan)	Deng, David	2.04 m (6 ft 8 in)	25 – 25 June 2000
C	21	(United States)	Hampton, Leon (I)	2.13 m (7 ft 0 in)	30 – 13 June 1995
F	23	(South Sudan)	Malual, Malual	1.87 m (6 ft 2 in)	25 – 30 July 2000
C	24	(South Sudan)	Maluach, Khaman (E)	2.13 m (7 ft 0 in)	19 – 14 September 2006
C	34	(South Sudan)	Akuei, Lual	2.08 m (6 ft 10 in)	35 – 12 January 1991
C		(Kenya)	Wamukota, Tom (injured) (I)	2.13 m (7 ft 0 in)	32 – 8 September 1993

Head coach

- (South Sudan) Manny Berberi

Assistant coach(es)

- (Kenya) John Omondi
- (South Sudan) Majak Kou

Legend

- (C) Team captain
- (I) Import player
- (E): BAL Elevate player
- Injured

- Roster
Updated: April 9, 2022

=== Espoir Fukash ===
Note: Flags indicate national team eligibility at FIBA-sanctioned events. Players may hold other non-FIBA nationalities not displayed.

Espoir Fukash roster
Players
Coaches

Pos.	No.	Nat.	Name	Ht.	Age
PG	00	(Democratic Republic of the Congo)	Mwana Mwamba, Arsène	1.80 m (5 ft 11 in)	24 – 8 April 2001
G/F	1	(Canada)	Ambanza, Narcisse (I)	1.88 m (6 ft 2 in)	29 – 3 December 1996
SG	2	(Democratic Republic of the Congo)	Ben Ilunga, Mutanga	1.90 m (6 ft 3 in)	24 – 17 May 2001
F	4	(Nigeria)	Okorafor, Emmanuel (E)	2.06 m (6 ft 9 in)	21 – 8 June 2004
F	5	(Democratic Republic of the Congo)	Kapongo Kabuya, Djack	1.96 m (6 ft 5 in)	32 – 15 February 1993
SG	6	(Democratic Republic of the Congo)	Kasongo Kasasa, Bobo	1.88 m (6 ft 2 in)	35 – 20 May 1990
PG	10	(Democratic Republic of the Congo)	Suke Tamba, Habraham	1.80 m (5 ft 11 in)	24 – 17 September 2001
PF	12	(Democratic Republic of the Congo)	Mandiangu Makwenda, Jeremie	2.01 m (6 ft 7 in)	21 – 20 April 2004
F/C	13	(Democratic Republic of the Congo)	Mpaka Laza, Chris	2.05 m (6 ft 9 in)	22 – 27 October 2003
F	15	(Democratic Republic of the Congo)	Fula Nganga, Rolly (C)	2.01 m (6 ft 7 in)	33 – 2 February 1993
PF	23	(Democratic Republic of the Congo)	Bobo Mel, Glory	1.98 m (6 ft 6 in)	36 – 2 October 1989
F	24	(Democratic Republic of the Congo)	Tshimbau, Jonathan	1.90 m (6 ft 3 in)	37 – 18 July 1988
PF	34	(Democratic Republic of the Congo)	Isungu, Emmanuel	2.04 m (6 ft 8 in)	31 – 26 January 1995

Head coach

- (Democratic Republic of the Congo) Raven Mwimba

Assistant coach(es)

- (Democratic Republic of the Congo) Emmanuel Mavomo
- (Democratic Republic of the Congo) Giresse Bongubufunao

Legend

- (C) Team captain
- (I) Import player
- (E): BAL Elevate program player
- Injured

- Roster
Updated: April 8, 2022

=== FAP ===
Ahead of the playoffs, Charles Minlend Jr. and Abou Diallo joined the team; they replaced Pierre Tankoua and Ebaku Akumenzoh.

FAP roster
Players
Coaches

Pos.	No.	Nat.	Name	Ht.	Age
PG	00	(United States)	Morman, Deshaun (WI)	1.95 m (6 ft 5 in)	31 – 26 February 1994
PG	1	(Cameroon)	Liale Keumoe, Cyrille	1.79 m (5 ft 10 in)	33 – 10 June 1992
G/F	2	(Cameroon)	Minlend Jr., Charles	1.93 m (6 ft 4 in)	28 – 19 December 1997
PF	4	(Cameroon)	Eyaga Bidias, Brice	2.05 m (6 ft 9 in)	27 – 26 October 1998
SF	5	(Cameroon)	Tsangue, Cédric	1.95 m (6 ft 5 in)	34 – 21 August 1991
F	6	(Cameroon)	Tankoua, Pierre	2.01 m (6 ft 7 in)	31 – 15 August 1994
SG	10	(Cape Verde)	Almeida, Joel (AI)	1.94 m (6 ft 4 in)	40 – 11 October 1985
C	13	(Cameroon)	Ngaransou, Yves-Louis	2.03 m (6 ft 8 in)	31 – 20 October 1994
F	14	(Cameroon)	Chomche, Ulrich (E)	2.11 m (6 ft 11 in)	20 – 30 December 2005
G/F	15	(Cameroon)	Tametong Toko, Étienne	1.85 m (6 ft 1 in)	33 – 13 July 1992
C	21	(United States)	Byers, Tyjhai (WI)	2.11 m (6 ft 11 in)	27 – 1 April 1998
SF	23	(Cameroon)	Essome, Pierre Cedric	1.95 m (6 ft 5 in)	36 – 31 May 1989
C	24	(Cameroon)	Wangmene, Alexis	2.04 m (6 ft 8 in)	36 – 1 March 1989
PF	28	(Senegal)	Diallo, Abou (AI)	2.01 m (6 ft 7 in)	30 – 30 June 1995
PF	41	(Cameroon)	Akumenzoh, Ebaku (C)	2.00 m (6 ft 7 in)	36 – 7 March 1989

Head coach

- (Cameroon) François Enyegue

Assistant coach(es)

- (Cameroon) Simon Mbabi

Physiotherapist(s)

- (Cameroon) Alfred Nije

Legend

- (C) Team captain
- (E): BAL Elevate player
- (WI): World import
- (AI): African import
- Injured

- Roster
Updated: May 20, 2022

=== Petro de Luanda ===
On May 8, 2022, Petro signed E. C. Matthews to join the team for the 2022 BAL Playoffs.

Note: Flags indicate national team eligibility at FIBA-sanctioned events. Players may hold other non-FIBA nationalities not displayed.

Petro de Luanda roster
Players
Coaches

Pos.	No.	Nat.	Name	Ht.	Age
SG	00	(United States)	E. C. Matthews (WI)	1.96 m (6 ft 5 in)	30 – 3 October 1995
PG	1	(Angola)	Gerson Domingos	1.78 m (5 ft 10 in)	29 – 16 April 1996
C	2	(Angola)	Yanick Moreira	2.11 m (6 ft 11 in)	34 – 31 July 1991
SG	4	(Angola)	Olímpio Cipriano	1.94 m (6 ft 4 in)	43 – 4 September 1982
PG	5	(Angola)	Childe Dundão	1.67 m (5 ft 6 in)	27 – 17 May 1998
SG	6	(Angola)	Carlos Morais (C)	1.92 m (6 ft 4 in)	40 – 16 October 1985
SG	10	(Angola)	Gerson Gonçalves	1.93 m (6 ft 4 in)	29 – 29 March 1996
PG	11	(Central African Republic)	Thierry Serge Darlan (E)	1.98 m (6 ft 6 in)	22 – 2 February 2004
SG	12	(Cape Verde)	Anderson Correia (AI)	1.95 m (6 ft 5 in)	28 – 30 October 1997
SF	13	(Angola)	Leonel Paulo	1.97 m (6 ft 6 in)	39 – 30 April 1986
PF	15	(Angola)	Aboubakar Gakou	2.02 m (6 ft 8 in)	28 – 27 May 1997
C	21	(Angola)	Jone Pedro	2.08 m (6 ft 10 in)	43 – 4 September 1982
F	24	(Angola)	Ângelo Gouveia Alexandre	2.00 m (6 ft 7 in)	24 – 9 March 2001
C	41	(Angola)	Vander Joaquim	2.08 m (6 ft 10 in)	35 – 15 April 1990

Head coach

- (Brazil) José Neto

Assistant coach(es)

- (Spain) Jesus Gutierrez Fernandez
- (Angola) Anibal Moreira

Team manager

- (Angola) Artur Barros

Legend

- (C) Team captain
- (E): BAL Elevate player
- (WI): World import
- (AI): African import
- Injured

- Roster
Updated: May 20, 2022

=== Zamalek ===
On May 9, 2022, Mohab Yasser signed with Zamalek ahead of the playoffs.

Zamalek roster
Players
Coaches

Pos.	No.	Nat.	Name	Ht.	Age
PG	00	(Egypt)	Essam, Adham	1.88 m (6 ft 2 in)	34 – 25 November 1991
G	1	(Egypt)	Azab Farag, Ahmed	1.81 m (5 ft 11 in)	30 – 21 February 1995
G	2	(Cameroon)	Strawberry, D. J. (I)	1.98 m (6 ft 6 in)	40 – 15 June 1985
SG	4	(Egypt)	Hesham, Omar	1.91 m (6 ft 3 in)	30 – 29 March 1995
PG	5	(Dominican Republic)	Sosa, Édgar (I)	1.88 m (6 ft 2 in)	38 – 15 January 1988
PF/C	6	(Nigeria)	Diogu, Ike (I)	2.06 m (6 ft 9 in)	42 – 11 September 1983
PF	10	(Egypt)	Mahmoud, Anas	2.13 m (7 ft 0 in)	30 – 9 May 1995
PG	11	(United States)	McKinney, Mikh (I)	1.85 m (6 ft 1 in)	34 – 26 January 1992
SG	12	(Egypt)	Salem, Eslam	1.91 m (6 ft 3 in)	36 – 20 March 1989
G	14	(Senegal)	Rassoul Mboup, Khadim (E)	2.01 m (6 ft 7 in)	19 – 14 September 2006
G	15	(Egypt)	Yasser, Mohab	1.96 m (6 ft 5 in)	23 – 7 June 2002
F	23	(Egypt)	Yasser, Ahmed	2.01 m (6 ft 7 in)	24 – 18 June 2001
C	28	(Egypt)	Elmashad, Hazem	2.06 m (6 ft 9 in)	26 – 22 February 1999
C	41	(Egypt)	Kejo, Mostafa (C)	2.03 m (6 ft 8 in)	31 – 24 October 1994

Head coach

- (United States) Will Voigt

Legend

- (C) Team captain
- (I) Import player
- (E): BAL Elevate program player
- Injured

- Roster
Updated: May 20, 2022
