= Arnold Kome =

Cameroonian basketball player

No. 21 – FAP
- Position: Shooting guard
- League: Elite Messieurs; Basketball Africa League

Personal information
- Born: 11 September 1992 (age 34) Bamenda, Cameroon
- Listed height: 1.95 m (6 ft 5 in)

Career history
- 2016: Nzui-Manto
- 2016–2017: Yaoundé Giants
- 2017–present: FAP

Career highlights
- Cameroonian League champion (2020)

Arnold Akola Kome (born 11 September 1992) is a Cameroonian basketball player who plays for FAP Basketball and Cameroon. He plays as shooting guard.

== National team career ==
Kome plays for the Cameroonian national basketball team and has played at the AfroBasket in 2017 and 2021.

== BAL career statistics ==
Legend
GP	Games played	GS	Games started	MPG	Minutes per game
FG%	Field goal percentage	3P%	3-point field goal percentage	FT%	Free throw percentage
RPG	Rebounds per game	APG	Assists per game	SPG	Steals per game
BPG	Blocks per game	PPG	Points per game	**Bold**	Career high

Year	Team	GP	GS	MPG	FG%	3P%	FT%	RPG	APG	SPG	BPG	PPG
2021	FAP	4	0	21.1	.346	.308	.333	4.0	3.0	1.0	.0	6.5
Career		4	0	21.1	.346	.308	.333	4.0	3.0	1.0	.0	6.5
