= 2022 BAL playoffs =

2nd edition of BAL Playoffs

2022 BAL Playoffs
Tournament details
- Venue(s): BK Arena (Note: The BK Arena was named the Kigali Arena as the name was changed during the season. On May 24, 2022, the arena's name was changed to the BK Arena after a six-year sponsorship deal worth 7 billion RF with the Bank of Kigali.), Kigali, Rwanda
- Dates: 21 – 28 May 2021
- Teams: 8

Final positions
- Champions: (Tunisia) US Monastir (1st title)
- Runners-up: (Angola) Petro de Luanda
- Third place: (Egypt) Zamalek
- Fourth place: (Cameroon) FAP

Tournament statistics
- Matches played: 8

The 2022 BAL Playoffs was the second edition of the playoffs of the Basketball Africa League (BAL) and was the concluding tournament of the 2022 BAL season. The playoffs began on 21 May 2022 and ended on 28 May 2022 with the Finals. For a second consecutive season, all playoffs games were played at the BK Arena in Kigali, Rwanda.

The official schedule was announced on 8 February 2022.

== Quarterfinals ==
All times are in the local Greenwich Mean Time (GMT).

=== Petro de Luanda vs. AS Salé ===
Petro de Luanda and AS Salé were meeting each other in the BAL for the third time. It was a re-match of the 2021 quarterfinals that was won by Petro. Petro de Luanda scored 19 three-pointers on its way to a blowout against Salé, leading by as much as 28 points in the third quarter.

21 May 2022	Petro de Luanda (Angola)	102–89	(Morocco) AS Salé	Kigali
14:30	Scoring by quarter: 20–16, 30–19, 30–17, 22–37
	Pts: Morais 27; Rebs: Gonçalves 10; Asts: Dundão 5 PIR: Gonçalves 27	Boxscore	Pts: Harouna 20; Rebs: Dramé 13; Asts: Lahrichi, Stoglin 3 PIR: Dramé 28	Arena: Kigali Arena; Attendance: 1,950; Referees: JD Ralls, Kalume Tonton Banza, Marie Leslie Cherubin

=== REG vs. FAP ===
The two teams never faced each other before. In a record attendance of 7,576, FAP surprisingly beat REG as the host team had 25 turnovers in the game. FAP led by as much as 52–39 in the third quarter, before REG cut back the deficit in the final quarter. Olivier Shyaka scored a three-pointer with 4:30 minutes left to bring FAP's lead to one.

21 May 2022	REG (Rwanda)	63–66	(Cameroon) FAP	Kigali
18:00	Scoring by quarter: 17–23, 14–13, 17–19, 15–11
	Pts: Thomas 23; Rebs: Nshobozwabyosenumukiza 11; Asts: Nshobozwabyosenumukiza 8 PIR: Thomas 17	Boxscore	Pts: Morman 14; Rebs: Byers 10; Asts: Keumoe, Morman 3 PIR: Byers 17	Arena: Kigali Arena; Attendance: 7,576; Referees: Brent Haskil, Yann Vezo Davidson, Sara Elsharnouby

=== US Monastir vs. Cape Town Tigers ===
The two teams have never faced each other before. Monastir defeated Cape Town comfortably, never trailing in the game. With a margin of 39 points, it was the largest win in the BAL season.

22 May 2022	US Monastir (Tunisia)	106–67	(South Africa) Cape Town Tigers	Kigali
13:30	Scoring by quarter: 22–18, 22–15, 27–26, 35–8
	Pts: Dixon 23; Rebs: Majok 9 Asts: Five players 5 PIR: Dixon 24	Boxscore	Pts: Early 15; Rebs: Prinsloo 8 Asts: Kabongo 5 PIR: Prinsloo 18	Arena: Kigali Arena; Attendance: 718; Referees: Hortensia Sanchez-Carrizales, Wael Ibrahim Mostafa, Mahamadou Diallo

=== Zamalek vs. SLAC ===
The two teams have never faced each other before. SLAC made its playoffs debut without its top scorer from the group phase, Chris Crawford, who signed in Syria. SLAC's rebounding leader Chris Obekpa missed the game due to injury.

22 May 2022	Zamalek (Egypt)	66–49	(Guinea) SLAC	Kigali
18:00	Scoring by quarter: 13–11, 20–10, 20–15, 13–13
	Pts: Kejo 14; Rebs: Kejo 12; Asts: Strawberry 4 PIR: Kejo 16	Boxscore	Pts: Barry 13; Rebs: Miller Jr. 14; Asts: Keita, Miller Jr. 19; PIR: Keita, Miller Jr. 19	Arena: Kigali Arena; Attendance: 1,833; Referees: Tyler Ricks, Antonio Bernardo, Jean Sauveur Ruhammiriza

== Semifinals ==
=== Petro de Luanda vs. FAP ===
The teams played each other before in the group phase of the 2021 season, with Petro winning the game 66–64.

25 May 2022	Petro de Luanda (Angola)	88–74	(Cameroon) FAP	Kigali
18:00	Scoring by quarter: 22–13, 24–22, 23–12, 19–27
	Pts: Dundão 18; Rebs: Moreira 9 Asts: Domingos 7 PIR: Dundão 23	Boxscore	Pts: Tsangue 13; Rebs: Tametong Toko 7 Asts: Morman 6 PIR: Tametong Toko 13	Arena: Kigali Arena; Referees: Tyler Ricks, Sara Elsharnouby, Mahamadou Diallo

=== US Monastir vs. Zamalek ===
The game was a re-match of the 2021 BAL Finals, in which Zamalek won the inaugural season title.

25 May 2022	US Monastir (Tunisia)	88–81	(Egypt) Zamalek	Kigali
21:30	Scoring by quarter: 16–22, 19–18, 29–18, 24–23
	Pts: Slimane 21; Rebs: Majok 9 Asts: Dixon, Coles Jr. 4 PIR: Dixon 20		Pts: McKinney 26; Rebs: Diogu, Mahmoud 9 Asts: Strawberry 5 PIR: McKinney 25	Arena: BK Arena; Referees: JD Ralls, Antonio Bernardo, Yann Vezo Davidson

== Third place game ==
27 May 2022	Zamalek (Egypt)	97–74	(Cameroon) FAP	Kigali
18:00	Scoring by quarter: 19–11, 23–18, 23–22, 32–23
	Pts: Strawberry 20; Rebs: Kejo 15; Asts: McKinney 10; PIR: McKinney, Strawberry 22	Boxscore	Pts: Minlend Jr., Wangmene 17; Rebs: Eyaga Bidias, Wangmene 7 Asts: Almeida 4 PIR: Wangmene 16	Arena: BK Arena; Referees: B Haskill, Jean Sauveur Ruhamiriza, Tonton Banza

== Finals ==
28 May 2022	Petro de Luanda (Angola)	72–83	(Tunisia) US Monastir	Kigali
18:00 CAT	Scoring by quarter: 17–18, 23–15, 19–24, 13–26
	Pts: Gonçalves 28; Rebs: Moreira 7 Asts: Gonçalves 4 PIR: Gonçalves 27	Boxscore	Pts: Dixon, Lahyani 21; Rebs: Lahyani 10; Asts: Dixon 6 PIR: Lahyani 24	Arena: BK Arena; Attendance: 10,000; Referees: Hortensia Sanchez-Carrizales, Wael Ibrahim Mostafa, Marie Leslie Cherubin

== Elevate Showcase ==
The BAL organised a showcase game between Elevate program players of the NBA Academy Africa and the Rwandan national under-23 team.

27 May 2022	Rwanda Under-23	53–72	NBA Academy Africa	Kigali
21:30	Scoring by quarter: 19–19, 15–19, 7–21, 12–13
	Pts: Uwitonze 17; Rebs: Turatsinze 8 Asts: De Dieu Umuhoza 6 PIR: Uwitonze, Nkundwa 12	Boxscore	Pts: Sane 21; Rebs: Maluach, Chinyelu 10; Asts: Mbaye, Camara 5 PIR: Chinyelu 22	Arena: BK Arena; Referees: Sarah Elsharnouby, Yann Davidson, F. Bernardo
