= Cédric Tsangue =

Cameroonian basketball player

No. 5 – Moanda BB
- Position: Small forward
- League: Road to BAL

Personal information
- Born: 21 August 1995 (age 31)
- Listed height: 1.97 m (6 ft 6 in)
- Listed weight: 92 kg (203 lb)

Career information
- NBA draft: 2013: undrafted
- Playing career: 2010–present

Career history
- 2010–2019: BEAC
- 2019: Manga BB
- 2019–2024: FAP
- 2024: KSA
- 2025–present: Moanda

Career highlights
- 4× Cameroonian League champion (2020–2024); 2× Cameroonian Cup champion (2011, 2017)

Cédric Tsangue Kenfack (born 21 August 1991) is a Cameroonian basketball player who plays for Moanda BB. He also plays for the Cameroon national team.

== Career ==
Tsangue started his career with BEAC in 2010. He won the Cameroon Cup in 2011 and 2017. He also played in the 2016 FIBA Africa Clubs Champions Cup with BEAC.

In 2019, he played with Gabonese club Manga BB in the 2020 BAL Qualifying Tournaments. He averaged 19.3 points in the qualifying tournament. He then went on to sign with FAP Basketball to play in the inaugural season of the Basketball Africa League (BAL), where he reached the quarterfinals.

Tsangue played for KSA starting in the 2024 season, and won the Elite Messieur championship with the team. The title was the first for a team from Douala in 10 years.

== BAL career statistics ==
Legend
GP	Games played	GS	Games started	MPG	Minutes per game
FG%	Field goal percentage	3P%	3-point field goal percentage	FT%	Free throw percentage
RPG	Rebounds per game	APG	Assists per game	SPG	Steals per game
BPG	Blocks per game	PPG	Points per game	**Bold**	Career high

Year	Team	GP	GS	MPG	FG%	3P%	FT%	RPG	APG	SPG	BPG	PPG
2021	FAP	4	4	16.5	.217	.091	.571	3.8	1.8	1.3	.0	4.8
Career		4	4	16.5	.217	.091	.571	3.8	1.8	1.3	.0	4.8

== Awards and accomplishments ==
BEAC

- 2× Cup of Cameroon: (2011, 2017)

FAP

- 3× Elite Messieurs: (2020, 2021, 2023)

KSA

- Elite Messieurs: (2024)
