= Ebaku Akumenzoh =

Cameroonian basketball player

No. 9 – FAP
- Position: Power forward
- League: Elite Messieurs; Basketball Africa League

Personal information
- Born: 7 March 1989 (age 37) Buea, Cameroon
- Listed height: 2.00 m (6 ft 7 in)
- Listed weight: 99 kg (218 lb)

Career information
- Playing career: 2013–present

Career history
- 2013–2015: FAP
- 2016–2017: Condor
- 2016: Nzui-Manto
- 2016–2017: Yaoundé Giants
- 2017–present: FAP

Career highlights
- Cameroonian League champion (2020)

Ebaku Nzoh Akumenzoh (born 7 March 1989) is a Cameroonian basketball player who plays for FAP Basketball and Cameroon. Standing at 2.00 m (6 ft 6 1/2 in), he plays as power forward.

== National team career ==
Akumenzoh plays for the Cameroonian national basketball team and has played in the qualifiers for AfroBasket 2017.

== BAL career statistics ==
Legend
GP	Games played	GS	Games started	MPG	Minutes per game
FG%	Field goal percentage	3P%	3-point field goal percentage	FT%	Free throw percentage
RPG	Rebounds per game	APG	Assists per game	SPG	Steals per game
BPG	Blocks per game	PPG	Points per game	**Bold**	Career high

Year	Team	GP	GS	MPG	FG%	3P%	FT%	RPG	APG	SPG	BPG	PPG
2021	FAP	4	0	15.9	.364	–	.250	3.3	.8	1.0	.5	4.3
Career		4	0	15.9	.364	–	.250	3.3	.8	1.0	.5	4.3
