= FAP Basketball =

FAP
- Nickname: Les Lions (The Lions)
- Leagues: Elite Messieurs
- Founded: 1972
- History: Forces Armées et Police Basketball; 1972–present
- Arena: Yaoundé Multipurpose Sports Complex
- Capacity: 5,263
- Location: Yaoundé, Cameroon
- Chairman: Jackson Kamgaing
- Head coach: Laurent Baleba
- Ownership: Cameroon Armed Forces
- Championships: 4 Cameroonian Leagues; 2 Cameroonian Cups; 5 Central Region Championships
- Website: fapbasketball.com
Home	Away	Third

Forces Armées et Police Basketball (transl. Armed Forces and Police), commonly known as simply FAP or FAP Yaoundé, is a basketball team based in Yaoundé, Cameroon. It is the basketball team of the Cameroonian armed forces and police. The team previously played in the Basketball Africa League (BAL) and domestically plays in the Elite Messieurs. FAP has won the national championship four times, the Cameroon Cup twice, and the Central Region League Championship five times.

The Yaoundé Multipurpose Sports Complex serves as home arena of the team.

== History ==
The club was established in 1972 in Yaoundé. In November 2019, FAP entered the qualifying tournaments for the newly established Basketball Africa League (BAL), representing Cameroon as runners-up because champions Condor BC refused its invitation. After a good first round run, FAP played even better in the second round. After beating ABC in the semi-finals, FAP qualified for the first edition of the BAL.

In 2020, FAP won its first silverware after winning the Elite Messieurs title. It went unbeaten in the Final Four tournament with a 6–0 record. Ahead of the inaugural BAL season in May 2021, FAP signed Lazare Adingono as head coach. In the following season, FAP repeated as champions.

In the 2022 BAL season, FAP finished in fourth place after eliminating the favoured Rwandan hosts REG in the quarter-finals. The third place game was lost to Zamalek.

== Arena ==
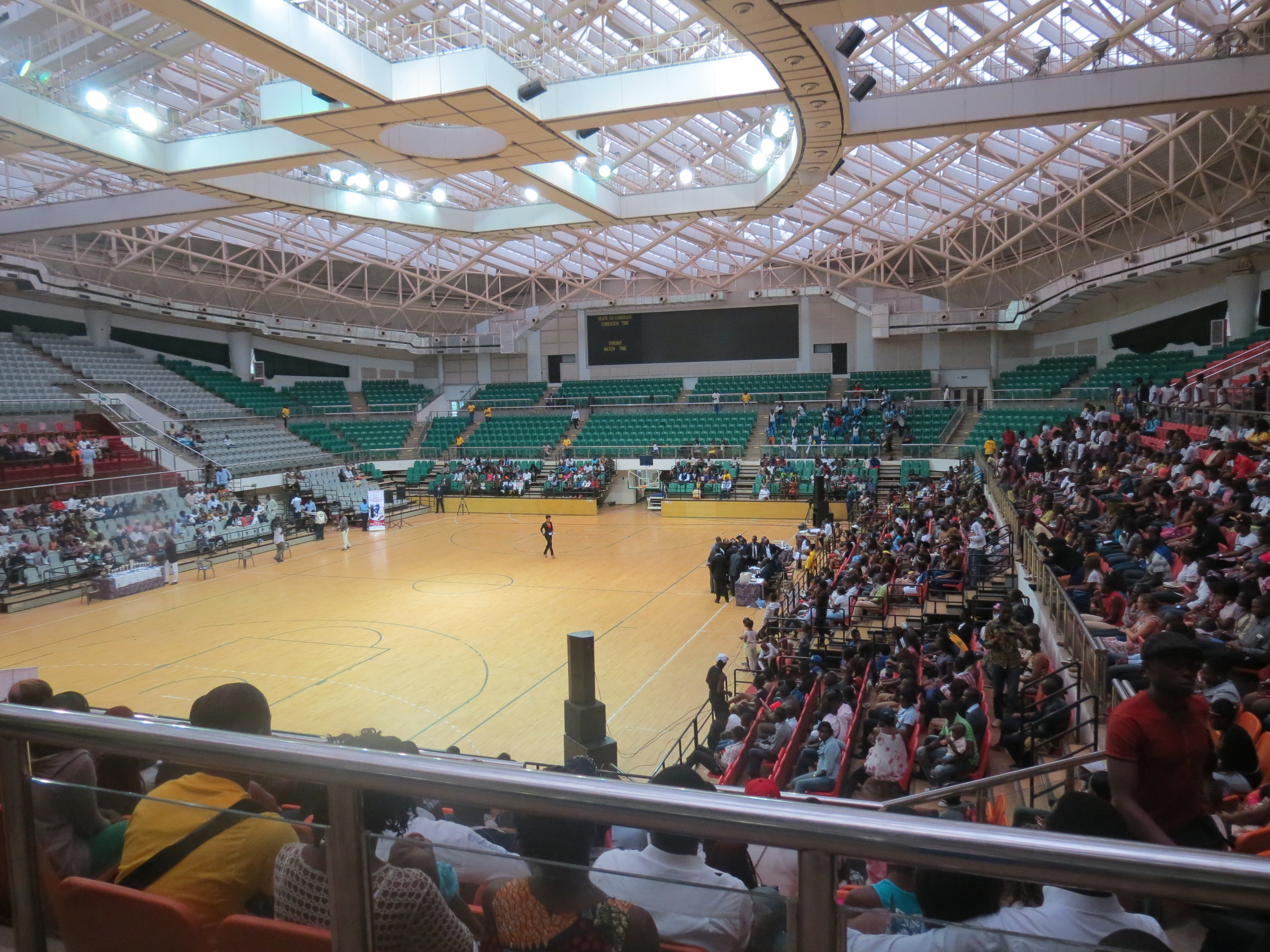
Interior view of the Yaoundé Multipurpose Sports Complex, home arena of FAP

The Yaoundé Multipurpose Sports Complex, built in 2009, is the home arena of FAP Basketball. Most basketball games of the Elite Messieurs final stages are played in the complex.

== Honours ==
=== Domestic ===
Elite Messieurs

- Champions (4): 2019–20, 2020–21, 2021–22, 2022–23
  - Runners-up (1): 2018–19

Cameroonian Cup

- Winners (2): 2022, 2024

=== Regional ===
Central Region League Championship

- Champions (5): 2011, 2016, 2018, 2021, 2022

=== International ===
Basketball Africa League

- Fourth place (1): 2022
- Quarter-finalist (1): 2021

BAL Qualifying Tournaments

- Winners (1): 2022 (West Division)
  - Runners-up (1): 2021 (West Division)

== Players ==
=== Current roster ===
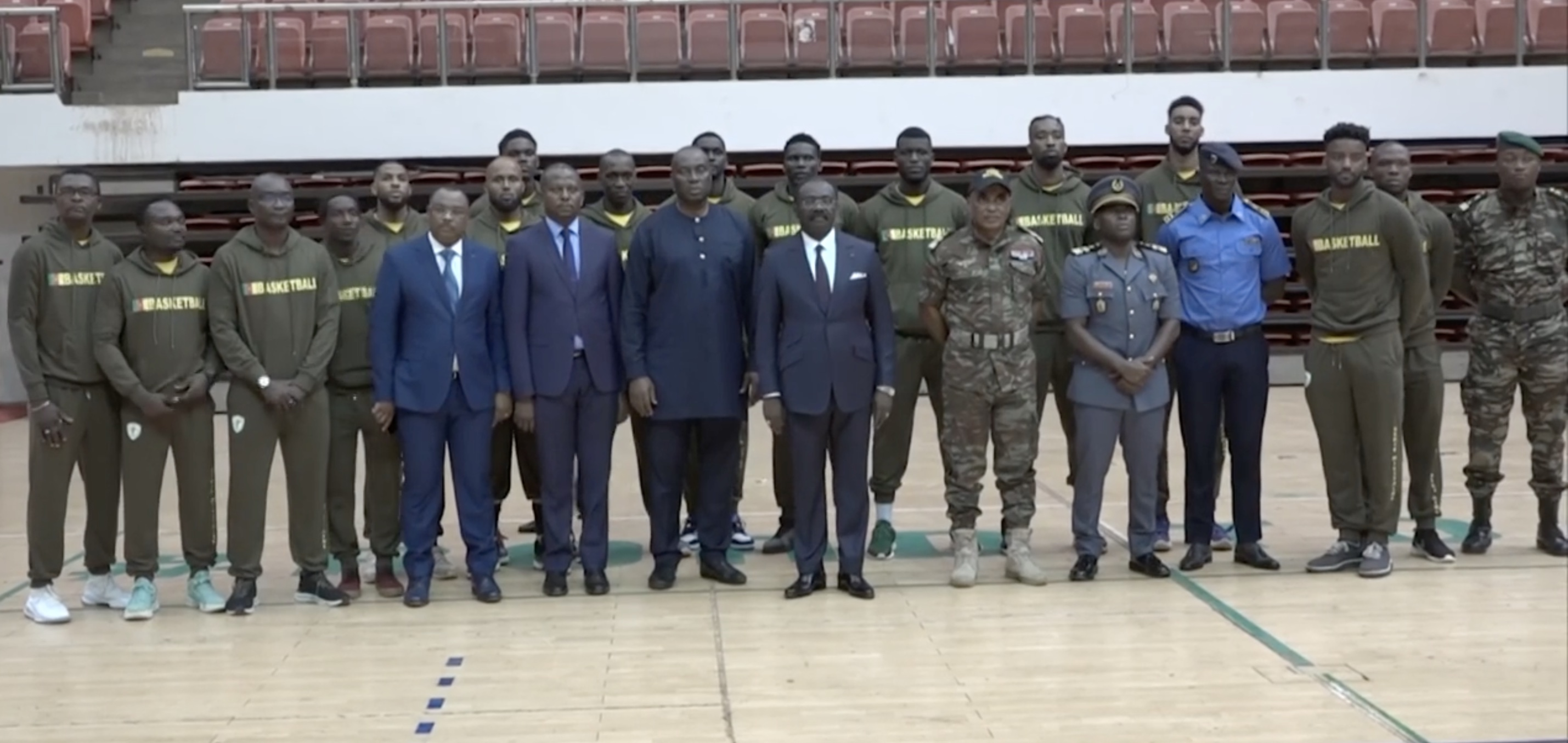
The FAP roster ahead of the 2022 BAL Playoffs

The following is the FAP roster for the 2022 BAL season:

FAP roster
Players
Coaches

Pos.	No.	Nat.	Name	Ht.	Age
PG	00	(United States)	Morman, Deshaun (WI)	1.95 m (6 ft 5 in)	31 – 26 February 1994
PG	1	(Cameroon)	Liale Keumoe, Cyrille	1.79 m (5 ft 10 in)	32 – 10 June 1992
G/F	2	(Cameroon)	Minlend Jr., Charles	1.93 m (6 ft 4 in)	27 – 19 December 1997
PF	4	(Cameroon)	Eyaga Bidias, Brice	2.05 m (6 ft 9 in)	26 – 26 October 1998
SF	5	(Cameroon)	Tsangue, Cédric	1.95 m (6 ft 5 in)	33 – 21 August 1991
F	6	(Cameroon)	Tankoua, Pierre	2.01 m (6 ft 7 in)	30 – 15 August 1994
SG	10	(Cape Verde)	Almeida, Joel (AI)	1.94 m (6 ft 4 in)	39 – 11 October 1985
C	13	(Cameroon)	Ngaransou, Yves-Louis	2.03 m (6 ft 8 in)	30 – 20 October 1994
F	14	(Cameroon)	Chomche, Ulrich (E)	2.11 m (6 ft 11 in)	19 – 30 December 2005
G/F	15	(Cameroon)	Tametong Toko, Étienne	1.85 m (6 ft 1 in)	32 – 13 July 1992
C	21	(United States)	Byers, Tyjhai (WI)	2.11 m (6 ft 11 in)	27 – 1 April 1998
SF	23	(Cameroon)	Essome, Pierre Cedric	1.95 m (6 ft 5 in)	35 – 31 May 1989
C	24	(Cameroon)	Wangmene, Alexis	2.04 m (6 ft 8 in)	36 – 1 March 1989
PF	28	(Senegal)	Diallo, Abou (AI)	2.01 m (6 ft 7 in)	29 – 30 June 1995
PF	41	(Cameroon)	Akumenzoh, Ebaku (C)	2.00 m (6 ft 7 in)	36 – 7 March 1989

Head coach

- (Cameroon) François Enyegue

Assistant coach(es)

- (Cameroon) Simon Mbabi

Physiotherapist(s)

- (Cameroon) Alfred Nije

Legend

- (C) Team captain
- (E): BAL Elevate player
- (WI): World import
- (AI): African import
- Injured

- Roster
Updated: May 20, 2022

=== Past rosters ===
- 2021 BAL season
- 2022 BAL season

=== Notable players ===
- (United States) Jordan Rezendes (1 year: 2020)
- (Cape Verde) Joel Almeida (2 years: 2021–present)
- (Cameroon) Alexis Wangmene (1 year: 2022)
- (Cameroon) Charles Minlend Jr. (1 year: 2022)
- (Cameroon) Ebaku Akumenzoh (2013–15, 2017–present)

== Head coaches ==
- (Cameroon) Gilles Kouamo: (–2021)
- (Cameroon) Lazare Adingono: (2021)
- (Cameroon) François Enyegue: (2021–2023)
- (Cameroon) Kevin Ngwese: (2023–2024)
- (Cameroon) Laurent Baleba: (2023–2024)

== Performance in the Basketball Africa League ==
Year	Road to BAL			BAL		
Year	W	L	Result	W	L	Result
2021	6	2	Silver	1	3	Quarter-finalist
2022	6	0	Gold	2	3	Fourth Place
2023	1	2	Elite 16	DNQ		
Total	13	4	3/3	3	6	2/3
