= E. C. Matthews =

American basketball player (born 1995)

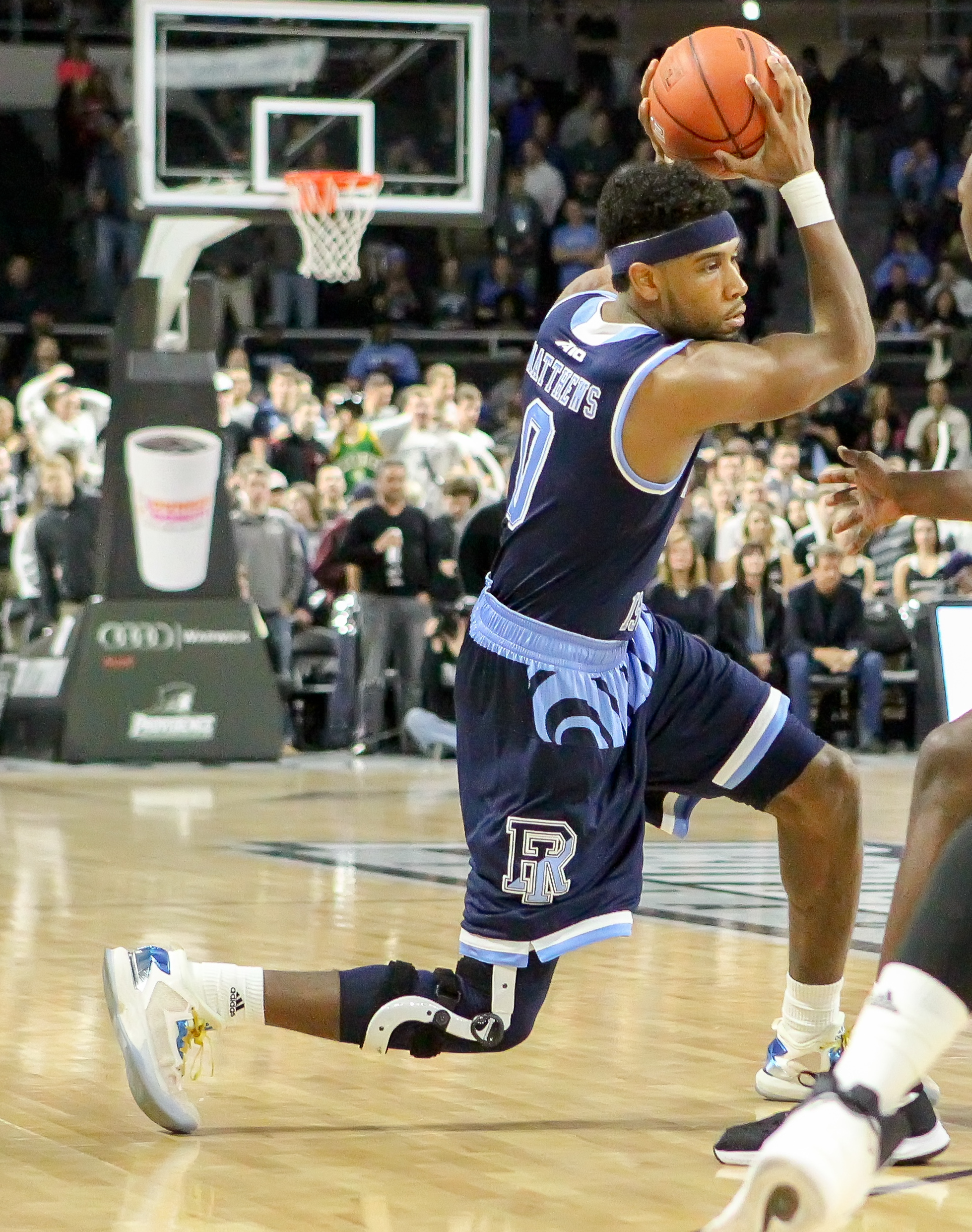
- Matthews in 2016

No. 7 – KK Feniks 2010
- Position: Shooting guard
- League: Macedonian First League

Personal information
- Born: October 3, 1995 (age 31) Detroit, Michigan, U.S.
- Listed height: 6 ft 5 in (1.96 m)
- Listed weight: 200 lb (91 kg)

Career information
- High school: Romulus (Romulus, Michigan)
- College: Rhode Island (2013–2018)
- NBA draft: 2018: undrafted
- Playing career: 2018–present

Career history
- 2018–2019: Kouvot
- 2019–2020: Erie BayHawks
- 2020: Raptors 905
- 2020–2021: Oliveirense
- 2021–2022: Grindavík
- 2022: Petro de Luanda
- 2022–2023: KR
- 2023: Baskonia B
- 2023: BK Olomoucko
- 2023–2024: KK Feniks 2010 Skopje
- 2024: Soles
- 2024–2025: Sheffield Sharks
- 2025: Oliveirense
- 2025–present: KK Feniks 2010 Skopje

Career highlights
- SLB Cup Winner (2025); Second-team All-Atlantic 10 (2015)

Elbert Clark Matthews (born October 3, 1995) is an American professional basketball player who plays for KK Feniks 2010 Skopje of the Macedonian Prva Liga. He played college basketball for the Rhode Island Rams, with whom he was a Second-team All-Atlantic 10 in 2015.

== High school career ==
He was born in Detroit, Michigan and attended Romulus High School where he played for head coach Nate Oats. As a senior, Matthews averaged 17.5 points, 7.2 rebounds, and 2.5 assists per game and led Romulus to a state title. He was a 4 star recruit who committed to Rhode Island.

== College career ==
As a freshman, Matthews averaged 14.3 points per game and was named A-10 rookie of the year. He increased his points production to 16.9 per game as a sophomore and led Rhode Island to the NIT. He was named to the Second Team All-Atlantic 10. In his junior season, he suffered a season-ending injury to his right knee in the first game. He credits the injury for teaching him how to live in the moment.

As a redshirt junior, he was named to the Third Team All-Atlantic 10. Matthews averaged 14.9 points and 4.3 rebounds per game and was Most Outstanding Player of the A-10 tournament after leading Rhode Island to a title. In November 2017, he fractured his wrist and missed several games. He repeated on the Third Team All-Atlantic 10 as a senior. He led the Rams to an NCAA Tournament appearance and averaged 13.1 points per game. Matthews scored 23 points in his season-ending loss to Duke in the NCAA Tournament.

== Professional career ==
Matthews signed his first professional contract with Kouvot of the Korisliiga. On October 26, 2019, Matthews was selected 16th overall by the Erie BayHawks in the 2019 NBA G League Draft. He was the only BayHawks draftee to make the team. Matthews averaged 3.7 points, 1.5 rebounds and one assist per game in 15 games. He was waived on January 2, 2020. On January 6, 2020, Matthews signed with the Raptors 905. He was waived on January 16 after appearing in two games.

On June 18, 2020, Matthews signed with Oliveirense of the Liga Portuguesa de Basquetebol (LPB).

In October 2021, Matthews signed with Grindavík of the Úrvalsdeild karla. On 25 March 2022, Matthews scored a game winning three pointer at the buzzer against Stjarnan.

On May 8, 2022, Matthews was announced by the Angolan club Petro de Luanda to join the team for the 2022 BAL Playoffs.

On October 21, 2022, Matthews signed with KR, replacing Michael Mallory. On January 2, 2023, it was announced he would leave the team following its game against Grindavík on 5 January.
