= 2016 FIBA Africa Clubs Champions Cup =

FIBA Africa Clubs Champions Cup
- Official tournament logo.
- Season: 2016
- Dates: December 7–16
- Teams: 10

Regular season
- Season MVP: (United States) Wayne Arnold

Finals
- Champions: (Egypt) Al Ahly (1st title)
- Runners-up: (Angola) Rec do Libolo
- Third place: (Morocco) AS Salé
- Fourth place: (Nigeria) Kano Pillars

Statistical leaders
Points	(Dominican Republic) Manny Quezada	23.6
Rebounds	(Egypt) Tarek El-Ghannam	11
Assists	(Algeria) Abdelhalim Kaouane	8.3

The 2016 FIBA Africa Basketball Club Championship (31st edition), was an international basketball tournament held in Cairo, Egypt from December 7 to 16, 2016. The tournament, organized by FIBA Africa and hosted by Al Ahly was contested by 10 clubs split into 2 groups of five, the top four of each group qualifying for the knock-out stage, quarter, semi-finals and final.

Al Ahly Sporting Club from Egypt was the winner.

== Draw ==
Group A	Group B
(Egypt) Al Ahly (Tunisia) Club Africain (Nigeria) Kano Pillars (Cameroon) Nzui Manto (Angola) Primeiro de Agosto	(Morocco) AS Salé (Cameroon) BEAC (Uganda) City Oilers (Algeria) GS Pétroliers (Angola) Recreativo do Libolo

== Preliminary round ==
Times given below are in EET UTC+2.

=== Group A ===
Qualified for the quarter-finals

	Team	M	W	L	PF	PA	Diff	P
1.	(Egypt) Al Ahly	4	4	0	321	267	+54	8
2.	(Tunisia) Club Africain	4	3	1	328	278	+50	7
3.	(Nigeria) Kano Pillars	4	2	2	292	333	-41	6
4.	(Angola) Primeiro de Agosto	4	1	3	304	317	-13	5
5.	(Cameroon) Nzui Manto	4	0	4	283	333	-50	4

Wed, 7 Dec 2016
19:00

Boxscore

Al Ahly (Egypt)	82–53	(Cameroon) Nzui Manto
Scoring by quarter: 20-12, 16-16, 17-12, 29-13
Pts: Arnold 14; Rebs: El-Ghannam 8 Asts: Arnold 6		Pts: Bogmis 15; Rebs: Bogmis 8 Asts: Bogmis 2

Al Ahly Sports Hall, Cairo

Wed, 7 Dec 2016
21:15

Boxscore

Kano Pillars (Nigeria)	47–87	(Tunisia) Club Africain
Scoring by quarter: 10-28, 13-14, 11-23, 13-22
Pts: Usman 16; Rebs: Ugboaja 8 Asts: Ugboaja 3		Pts: Vinales 18; Rebs: Hadidane 6 Asts: Vinales 6

Al Ahly Sports Hall, Cairo

Thu, 8 Dec 2016
20:15

Boxscore

Nzui Manto (Cameroon)	78–86	(Angola) 1º de Agosto
Scoring by quarter: 17-17, 22-21, 18-22, 21-26
Pts: Momeboll 18; Rebs: Bileg II 9 Asts: Kalume 4		Pts: Quezada 27; Rebs: Gildo 9 Asts: Quezada 6

Al Ahly Sports Hall, Cairo

Fri, 9 Dec 2016
18:00

Boxscore

Club Africain (Tunisia)	74–79 (OT)	(Egypt) Al Ahly
Scoring by quarter: 15-22, 17-16, 19-12, 14-15, Overtime: 9-14
Pts: Vinales 31; Rebs: Chennoufi 11; Asts: Vinales 4		Pts: El-Gammal 22; Rebs: El-Ghannam 15; Asts: Moustafa 6

Al Ahly Sports Hall, Cairo

Sat, 10 Dec 2016
13:30

Boxscore

Nzui Manto (Cameroon)	75–86	(Nigeria) Kano Pillars
Scoring by quarter: 21-17, 8-26, 22-24, 24-19
Pts: Kalume 22; Rebs: Momeboll 10; Asts: Ngami 3		Pts: Yahaya 20; Rebs: Enan 8 Asts: Gumut 7

Al Ahly Sports Hall, Cairo

Sat, 10 Dec 2016
18:00

Boxscore

Al Ahly (Egypt)	68–64	(Angola) 1º de Agosto
Scoring by quarter: 19-19, 21-18, 18-12, 10-15
Pts: El-Gammal 16; Rebs: El-Ghannam 11; Asts: Cummings 6		Pts: Gildo 14; Rebs: Islando 10; Asts: Armando 4

Al Ahly Sports Hall, Cairo

Sun, 11 Dec 2016
13:30

Boxscore

1º de Agosto (Angola)	79–83	(Nigeria) Kano Pillars
Scoring by quarter: 29-15, 14-23, 24-24, 12-21
Pts: Islando 22; Rebs: Islando 10; Asts: Gildo 12		Pts: Usman 23; Rebs: Yahaya 9 Asts: Gumut 3

Al Ahly Sports Hall, Cairo

Sun, 11 Dec 2016
20:15

Boxscore

Club Africain (Tunisia)	79–77	(Cameroon) Nzui Manto
Scoring by quarter: 17-16, 16-18, 16-20, 30-23
Pts: Vinales 23; Rebs: Mathews 15; Asts: Vinales 6		Pts: Bogmis 23; Rebs: Momeboll 9 Asts: Kalume 7

Al Ahly Sports Hall, Cairo

Mon, 12 Dec 2016
18:00

Boxscore

1º de Agosto (Angola)	75–88	(Tunisia) Club Africain
Scoring by quarter: 17-24, 15-16, 12-15, 31-33
Pts: Quezada 29; Rebs: Islando 8 Asts: Quezada 7		Pts: Chennoufi 17; Rebs: Hadidane 10; Asts: Vinales 7

Al Ahly Sports Hall, Cairo

Mon, 12 Dec 2016
20:15

Boxscore

Kano Pillars (Nigeria)	76–92	(Egypt) Al Ahly
Scoring by quarter: 15-25, 18-24, 11-29, 32-14
Pts: Ugboaja 19; Rebs: Yahaya 10; Asts: Yusuf 3		Pts: Arnold 17; Rebs: Said 8 Asts: Eldahshan 6

Al Ahly Sports Hall, Cairo

=== Group B ===
Qualified for the quarter-finals

	Team	M	W	L	PF	PA	Diff	P
1.	(Angola) Recreativo do Libolo	4	3	1	350	264	+86	7
2.	(Algeria) GS Pétroliers	4	3	1	332	296	+36	7
3.	(Morocco) AS Salé	4	3	1	336	316	+20	7
4.	(Cameroon) BEAC	4	1	3	246	313	-67	5
5.	(Uganda) City Oilers	4	0	4	250	325	-75	4

Wed, 7 Dec 2016
13:15

Boxscore

City Oilers (Uganda)	69–77	(Algeria) GS Pétroliers
Scoring by quarter: 18-18, 5-24, 27-11, 19-24
Pts: Ocitti 24; Rebs: Ocitti 12; Asts: Ocitti 5		Pts: Hamdini 27; Rebs: Gaham; Asts: Kaouane 10

Al Ahly Sports Hall, Cairo
Referees: António Bernardo (ANG), Mohamed El Breiki (LBA), Francisco Tando (ANG)

Wed, 7 Dec 2016
:00

Boxscore

Rec do Libolo (Angola)	83–84	(Morocco) AS Salé
Scoring by quarter: 12-23, 33-19, 17-20, 21-22
Pts: Olímpio 24; Rebs: Harris 8 Asts: Foster 4		Pts: Freeman 22; Rebs: Kourodu 12; Asts: El Masbahi 5

Al Ahly Sports Hall, Cairo

Thu, 8 Dec 2016
18:00

Boxscore

Rec do Libolo (Angola)	93–84	(Algeria) GS Pétroliers
Scoring by quarter: 26-18, 22-22, 24-23, 21-21
Pts: Vander 26; Rebs: Vander 11; Asts: Vander 4		Pts: Wells 16; Rebs: Wells 10; Asts: Benzegala 6

Al Ahly Sports Hall, Cairo

Fri, 9 Dec 2016
20:15

Boxscore

AS Salé (Morocco)	91–71	(Cameroon) BEAC
Scoring by quarter: 27-14, 16-16, 27-22, 21-19
Pts: Freeman 23; Rebs: Najah 10; Asts: El Masbahi 6		Pts: Essome 22; Rebs: Tsaace 11; Asts: Kenfack 2

Al Ahly Sports Hall, Cairo

Sat, 10 Dec 2016
15:45

Boxscore

AS Salé (Morocco)	83–72	(Uganda) City Oilers
Scoring by quarter: 17-21, 18-22, 26-16, 22-13
Pts: Freeman 20; Rebs: Najah 9 Asts: Zouita 4		Pts: Kabangu 19; Rebs: Ndikumana 11; Asts: Komakech 10

Al Ahly Sports Hall, Cairo

Sat, 10 Dec 2016
20:15

Boxscore

BEAC (Cameroon)	52–76	(Angola) Rec do Libolo
Scoring by quarter: 12-22, 14-21, 11-23, 15-10
Pts: Kenfack 11; Rebs: Ngwese 6 Asts: Ntamack 2		Pts: Fortes 16; Rebs: Mingas 7 Asts: Gerson 5

Al Ahly Sports Hall, Cairo

Sun, 11 Dec 2016
15:45

Boxscore

BEAC (Cameroon)	67–65 (OT)	(Uganda) City Oilers
Scoring by quarter: 22-11, 10-16, 7-11, 20-21, Overtime: 8-6
Pts: Pamga 12; Rebs: Tsaace 16; Asts: Ntamack 3		Pts: Kabangu 25; Rebs: Ocitti 18; Asts: Enabu 8

Al Ahly Sports Hall, Cairo

Sun, 11 Dec 2016
18:00

Boxscore

GS Pétroliers (Algeria)	90–78	(Morocco) AS Salé
Scoring by quarter: 21-23, 17-11, 29-29, 23-15
Pts: Gaham 20; Rebs: Touati 9 Asts: Kaouane 5		Pts: Zouita 21; Rebs: Najah 13; Asts: El Mahsini 6

Al Ahly Sports Hall, Cairo

Mon, 12 Dec 2016
13:30

Boxscore

City Oilers (Uganda)	44–98	(Angola) Rec do Libolo
Scoring by quarter: 8-20, 10-27, 25-32, 1-19
Pts: Kabangu 16; Rebs: Ocitti 7 Asts: Enabu 6		Pts: Foster 20; Rebs: Mingas 7 Asts: Gerson 9

Al Ahly Sports Hall, Cairo

Mon, 12 Dec 2016
15:45

Boxscore

BEAC (Cameroon)	56–81	(Algeria) GS Pétroliers
Scoring by quarter: 7-23, 12-22, 18-14, 19-22
Pts: Tsaace 13; Rebs: Tsaace 8 Asts: Ntamack 3		Pts: Adrar 15; Rebs: Ghezzoul 13; Asts: Kaouane 6

Al Ahly Sports Hall, Cairo

== Knockout round ==
Championship bracket

Quarter-finals
Wed 14 Dec 2016 – 18:00
(Cameroon) BEAC	60
(Egypt) Al Ahly	63
Wed 14 Dec 2016 – 13:30
(Nigeria) Kano Pillars	91
(Algeria) GS Pétroliers	81
Wed 14 Dec 2016 – 13:30
(Angola) 1º de Agosto	78
(Angola) Rec do Libolo	83
Wed 14 Dec 2016 – 20:15
(Morocco) AS Salé	77
(Tunisia) Club Africain	70

Semi-finals
Thu 15 Dec 2016 – 18:00
(Egypt) Al Ahly	71
(Nigeria) Kano Pillars	65
Thu 15 Dec 2016 – 20:15
(Angola) Rec do Libolo	82
(Morocco) AS Salé	72

Final
Fri 16 Dec 2016 – 18:00
(Egypt) Al Ahly SC	68
(Angola) Rec do Libolo	66
3rd place
Fri 16 Dec 2016 – 15:45
(Nigeria) Kano Pillars	76
(Morocco) AS Salé	88

5-8th bracket

5–8th place
Thu 15 Dec 2016 – 16:15
(Angola) 1º de Agosto	68
(Tunisia) Club Africain	83
Thu 15 Dec 2016 – 15:45
(Cameroon) BEAC	67
(Algeria) GS Pétroliers	74

Fifth place
Fri 16 Dec 2016 – 13:30
(Algeria) GS Pétroliers	59
(Tunisia) Club Africain	66
Seventh place
Fri 16 Dec 2016 – 09:45
(Cameroon) BEAC	72
(Angola) 1º de Agosto	55

=== 9th place ===
Wed, 14 Dec 2016
11:15

Boxscore

Nzui Manto (Cameroon)	69–88	(Uganda) City Oilers
Scoring by quarter: 12-19, 14-23, 20-24, 23-22
Pts: Kalume 23; Rebs: Bileg II 12; Asts: Kalume 3		Pts: Ocitti 19; Rebs: Ocitti 7 Asts: Komakech 10

Al Ahly Sports Hall, Cairo

=== Quarter finals ===
Wed, 14 Dec 2016
13:30

Boxscore

Kano Pillars (Nigeria)	91–81	(Algeria) GS Pétroliers
Scoring by quarter: 17-19, 19-20, 28-19, 27-23
Pts: Usman 35; Rebs: Ugboaja 8 Asts: Gumut 7		Pts: Hamdini 18; Rebs: Gaham 6 Asts: Kaouane 6

Al Ahly Sports Hall, Cairo

Wed, 14 Dec 2016
15:45

Boxscore

1º de Agosto (Angola)	78–83	(Angola) Rec do Libolo
Scoring by quarter: 19-20, 16-20, 17-21, 26-22
Pts: Quezada 24; Rebs: Miller 13; Asts: Gildo 3		Pts: Olímpio 18; Rebs: Mingas 14; Asts: Foster 11

Al Ahly Sports Hall, Cairo

Wed, 14 Dec 2016
18:00

Boxscore

BEAC (Cameroon)	60–63	(Egypt) Al Ahly
Scoring by quarter: 11-23, 14-5, 9-17, 26-18
Pts: Pamga 16; Rebs: Tsaace 13; Asts: Essome 4		Pts: Arnold 22; Rebs: Arnold 9 Asts: Arnold 2

Al Ahly Sports Hall, Cairo

Wed, 14 Dec 2016
20:15

Boxscore

AS Salé (Morocco)	77–70	(Tunisia) Club Africain
Scoring by quarter: 21-9, 24-20, 12-22, 20-19
Pts: Zouita 26; Rebs: Najah 8 Asts: Freeman 3		Pts: Chennoufi 17; Rebs: Mathews 7 Asts: Vinales 5

Al Ahly Sports Hall, Cairo

=== 5th-8th place ===
Thu, 15 Dec 2016
13:30

Boxscore

BEAC (Cameroon)	67–74	(Algeria) GS Pétroliers
Scoring by quarter: 13-27, 21-8, 12-30, 21-9
Pts: Ntamack 16; Rebs: Mbouendeu 9 Asts: Ntamack 4		Pts: Zerouali 22; Rebs: Belkhodja 6 Asts: Kaouane 14

Al Ahly Sports Hall, Cairo

Thu, 15 Dec 2016
15:45

Boxscore

1º de Agosto (Angola)	68–83	(Tunisia) Club Africain
Scoring by quarter: 17-20, 7-29, 18-17, 26-17
Pts: Gildo 15; Rebs: Islando 5 Asts: Gildo 5		Pts: Hadidane 20; Rebs: Mathews 6 Asts: Vinales 7

Al Ahly Sports Hall, Cairo

=== Semifinals ===
Thu, 15 Dec 2016
18:00

Boxscore

Al Ahly (Egypt)	71–65	(Nigeria) Kano Pillars
Scoring by quarter: 15-13, 19-21, 20-17, 17-14
Pts: Arnold 19; Rebs: El-Ghannam 17; Asts: Arnold 4		Pts: Usman 17; Rebs: Yahaya 10; Asts: Enan 2

Al Ahly Sports Hall, Cairo

Thu, 15 Dec 2016
20:15

Boxscore

Rec do Libolo (Angola)	82–72	(Morocco) AS Salé
Scoring by quarter: 23-19, 18-13, 17-20, 24-20
Pts: Harris 21; Rebs: Mingas 9 Asts: Foster 10		Pts: Najah 20; Rebs: Najah 12; Asts: Zouita 5

Al Ahly Sports Hall, Cairo

=== 7th place ===
Fri, 16 Dec 2016
09:45

Boxscore

BEAC (Cameroon)	72–55	(Angola) 1º de Agosto
Scoring by quarter: 11-20, 13-10, 31-15, 17-10
Pts: Mbouendeu 21; Rebs: Tsaace 11; Asts: Eyeke 3		Pts: Quezada 24; Rebs: Islando 7 Asts: Quezada 3

Al Ahly Sports Hall, Cairo

=== 5th place ===
Fri, 16 Dec 2016
13:30

Boxscore

GS Pétroliers (Algeria)	59–66	(Tunisia) Club Africain
Scoring by quarter: 19-24, 6-8, 13-19, 21-15
Pts: Belkhodja 14; Rebs: Touati 11; Asts: Kaouane 12		Pts: Chouaya 18; Rebs: Dhifallah 9 Asts: Vinales 8

Al Ahly Sports Hall, Cairo

=== Bronze-medal game ===
Fri, 16 Dec 2016
15:45

Boxscore

Kano Pillars (Nigeria)	76–88	(Morocco) AS Salé
Scoring by quarter: 15-21, 18-19, 19-23, 24-25
Pts: Yahaya 21; Rebs: Yahaya 9 Asts: Usman 5		Pts: Freeman 30; Rebs: Choua 14; Asts: Khalfi 8

Al Ahly Sports Hall, Cairo

=== Gold-medal game ===
Nile Sports

16 December 2016
18:00

Boxscore

Al Ahly (Egypt)	68–66	(Angola) Rec do Libolo
Scoring by quarter: 14-13, 19-18, 21-19, 14-16
Pts: Cummings 23; Rebs: El-Ghannam 11; Asts: Arnold 8		Pts: Harris 16; Rebs: Mingas 12; Asts: Milton 4

Al Ahly Sports Hall, Cairo

Starters:			Pts	Reb	Ast
PG	6	(United States) Markeith Cummings	23	7	3
SG	9	(Egypt) Ibrahim El Gamaal	0	2	1
	10	(Egypt) Tarek El Ghanam	7	11	0
C	7	(Egypt) Ahmed Sayed Mohamed	1	1	0
PF	8	(Egypt) Seif Samir	2	1	0
Reserves:					
	12	(Egypt) Mostafa El Shafeey	8	3	0
SF	15	(Egypt) Moamen Abouelanin	DNP		
PG	20	(Egypt) Mouhanad ElSabagh	0	0	0
	23	(Egypt) Mohamed Abu Elnasr	0	2	0
	24	(Egypt) Karim El Dahshan	9	1	2
	55	(United States) Wayne Arnold	16	7	8
	69	(Egypt) Sherief Eldiastey	2	4	0
Head coach:
(Egyptian Basketball Federation) Tarek Khairy

Al Ahly	Rec do Libolo

Starters:			Pts	Reb	Ast
SF	4	(Angola) Olímpio Cipriano	10	3	2
PF	5	(United States) Andre Harris	16	4	0
SF	7	(Angola) Roberto Fortes	7	2	2
SG	8	(Angola) Elmer Félix	DNP		
SG	9	(United States) Je'Kel Foster	5	9	2
Reserves:					
PG	11	(Angola) Gerson Domingos	3	2	3
C	12	(Angola) Valdelício Joaquim	11	9	1
SF	14	(Angola) Jorge Tati	DNP		
C	15	(Angola) Eduardo Mingas	12	12	2
SF	17	(Angola) Benvindo Quimbamba	0	2	0
PG	18	(Angola) Milton Barros	2	2	4
SF	19	(Angola) Manda João	DNP		
Head coach:
(Spanish Basketball Federation) Hugo López

== Final standings ==
Rank	Team	Record
Gold medal	(Egypt) Al Ahly	7–0
Silver medal	(Angola) Recreativo do Libolo	5–2
Bronze medal	(Morocco) AS Salé	5–2
4	(Nigeria) Kano Pillars	3–4
5	(Tunisia) Club Africain	5–2
6	(Algeria) GS Pétroliers	4–3
7	(Cameroon) BEAC	2–5
8	(Angola) Primeiro de Agosto	1–6
9	(Uganda) City Oilers	1–4
10	(Cameroon) Nzui Manto	0–5

== Statistical leaders ==
=== Individual Tournament Highs ===
Points

Rank	Name	G	Pts	PPG
1	(Dominican Republic) Manny Quezada	5	118	23.6
2	(Cameroon) Etienne Kalume	5	93	18.6
3	(Nigeria) Abubakar Usman	7	128	18.3
4	(United States) Brandon Freeman	6	109	18.2
5	(United States) Kyle Vinales	7	127	18.1
6	(Morocco) Abdelhakim Zouita	7	126	18
7	(Rwanda) Kami Kabangu	5	86	17.2
8	(Uganda) Stanley Ocitti	5	84	16.8
9	(Cameroon) Félix Bogmis	4	65	16.3
10	(Algeria) Abdellah Hamdini	6	96	16

Rebounds

Rank	Name	G	Rbs	RPG
1	(Egypt) Tarek El-Ghannam	6	66	11
2	(Uganda) Stanley Ocitti	5	49	9.8
3	(Cameroon) Mohaman Tsaace	7	65	9.3
4	(Morocco) Abderrahim Najah	7	62	8.9
5	(Angola) Eduardo Mingas	7	56	8
6	(Nigeria) Abdul Yahaya	7	56	8
7	(Morocco) Mohamed Choua	7	55	7.9
8	(United States) Averon Mathews	7	52	7.4
9	(Cameroon) Simon Bileg II	5	36	7.2
10	(Angola) Islando Manuel	7	50	7.1

Assists

Rank	Name	G	Ast	APG
1	(Algeria) Abdelhalim Kaouane	7	58	8.3
2	(Uganda) Jimmy Enabu	5	31	6.2
3	(United States) Kyle Vinales	7	43	6.1
4	(United States) Je'Kel Foster	7	40	5.7
5	(Uganda) Ben Komakech	5	25	5
6	(United States) Wayne Arnold	7	31	4.4
7	(Dominican Republic) Manny Quezada	5	21	4.2
7	(Angola) Hermenegildo Santos	7	28	4
9	(Cameroon) Etienne Kalume	5	19	3.8
9	(Belgium) Yassine El Mahsini	7	25	3.6

Steals

Rank	Name	G	Sts	SPG
1	(Uganda) Jimmy Enabu	5	17	3.4
2	(Cameroon) Félix Bogmis	7	10	2.5
3	(Nigeria) Abubakar Usman	7	15	2.1
4	(Nigeria) Dele Ademola	7	13	1.9
5	(Cameroon) Mohaman Tsaace	7	13	1.9
6	(Nigeria) Abdul Yahaya	4	13	1.9
7	(Uganda) Stanley Ocitti	7	9	1.8
8	(Cameroon) Etienne Kalume	7	9	1.8
8	(Morocco) Zakaria El Masbahi	7	12	1.7
8	(Uganda) Ben Komakech	7	8	1.6

Blocks

Rank	Name	G	Bks	BPG
1	(Egypt) Tarek El-Ghannam	6	15	2.5
2	(United States) Averon Mathews	7	10	1.4
3	(Morocco) Mohamed Choua	7	7	1
4	(Cameroon) Mohaman Tsaace	7	7	1
5	(Uganda) Stanley Ocitti	5	5	1
6	(Angola) Valdelício Joaquim	7	5	0.7
7	(Morocco) Soufiane Kourodu	6	4	0.7
8	(United States) Isaac Wells	6	4	0.7
8	(Rwanda) Kami Kabangu	5	3	0.6
10	(Nigeria) Dele Ademola	7	4	0.6

Turnovers

Rank	Name	G	Tos	TPG
1	(Cameroon) Etienne Kalume	5	21	4.2
2	(United States) Kyle Vinales	7	29	4.1
3	(Morocco) Abdelhakim Zouita	7	28	4
3	(Rwanda) Kami Kabangu	5	18	3.6
5	(Nigeria) Abubakar Usman	7	24	3.4
5	(Cameroon) Pierre Essome	6	19	3.2
7	(Dominican Republic) Manny Quezada	5	15	3
8	(Morocco) Soufiane Kourodu	6	17	2.8
9	(Algeria) Abdelhalim Kaouane	7	19	2.7
10	(Morocco) Abderrahim Najah	7	19	2.7

2-point field goal percentage

Pos	Name	A	M	%
1	(Morocco) Abdelhakim Zouita	71	43	60.6
2	(Morocco) Soufiane Kourodu	40	24	60
2	(Angola) Olímpio Cipriano	47	27	57.4
4	(Algeria) Mohamed Touati	46	26	56.5
5	(Algeria) Abdellah Hamdini	60	33	55
6	(Angola) Valdelício Joaquim	63	34	54
7	(Morocco) Abderrahim Najah	58	30	51.7
8	(United States) Averon Mathews	55	28	50.9
9	(Rwanda) Kami Kabangu	56	28	50
10	(United States) Andre Harris	30	13	43.3

3-point field goal percentage

Pos	Name	A	M	%
1	(Egypt) Karim Eldahshan	16	12	75
2	(United States) Brandon Freeman	30	17	56.7
3	(United States) Je'Kel Foster	44	22	50
4	(United States) Kyle Vinales	30	14	46.7
5	(Algeria) Mustapha Adrar	18	8	44.4
6	(Tunisia) Ziyed Chennoufi	19	8	42.1
7	(Tunisia) Naim Dhifallah	19	8	42.1
8	(Algeria) Hocine Gaham	36	14	38.9
9	(United States) Markeith Cummings	26	10	38.5
10	(United States) Andre Harris	29	11	37.9

Free throw percentage

Pos	Name	A	M	%
1	(Nigeria) Abubakar Usman	42	40	95.2
2	(United States) Wayne Arnold	37	33	89.2
3	(United States) Brandon Freeman	27	24	88.9
4	(United States) Kyle Vinales	33	29	87.9
5	(Dominican Republic) Manny Quezada	47	40	85.1
6	(Cameroon) Félix Bogmis	12	10	83.3
7	(Algeria) Abdellah Hamdini	36	27	75
8	(United States) Markeith Cummings	30	22	73.3
9	(Morocco) Abderrahim Najah	35	25	71.4
10	(Nigeria) Dele Ademola	21	15	71.4

=== Individual Game Highs ===
Department	Name	Total	Opponent
Points	(Nigeria) Abubakar Usman	35	(Algeria) GS Pétroliers
Rebounds	(Uganda) Stanley Ocitti	18	(Cameroon) BEAC
Assists	(Algeria) Abdelhalim Kaouane	14	(Cameroon) BEAC
Steals	(Nigeria) Dede Ademola (Nigeria) Abdul Yahaya	6	(Tunisia) Club Africain (Morocco) AS Salé
Blocks	(United States) Averon Mathews	5	(Cameroon) Nzui Manto
2-point field goal percentage	(Angola) Olímpio Cipriano	100% (8/8)	(Angola) 1º de Agosto
3-point field goal percentage	(Egypt) Karim Eldahshan	100% (4/4)	(Nigeria) Kano Pillars
Free throw percentage	(Nigeria) Abubakar Usman	100% (11/11)	(Angola) 1º de Agosto
Turnovers	four players	7	

=== Team Tournament Highs ===
Points

Rank	Name	G	Pts	PPG
1	(Angola) Recreativo do Libolo	7	581	83
2	(Morocco) AS Salé	7	573	81.9
3	(Tunisia) Club Africain	7	547	78.1
4	(Algeria) GS Pétroliers	7	546	78
5	(Nigeria) Kano Pillars	7	524	74.9
6	(Egypt) Al Ahly	7	523	74.7
7	(Angola) 1º de Agosto	7	505	72.1
8	(Cameroon) Nzui Manto	5	352	70.4
9	(Uganda) City Oilers	5	338	67.6
10	(Cameroon) BEAC	7	445	63.6

Rebounds

Rank	Name	G	Rbs	RPG
1	(Algeria) GS Pétroliers	7	314	44.9
2	(Egypt) Al Ahly	7	308	44
3	(Morocco) AS Salé	7	306	43.7
4	(Nigeria) Kano Pillars	7	305	43.6
5	(Cameroon) BEAC	7	298	42.6
6	(Angola) Recreativo do Libolo	7	298	42.6
7	(Uganda) City Oilers	5	209	41.8
8	(Tunisia) Club Africain	7	291	41.6
9	(Angola) 1º de Agosto	7	279	39.9
10	(Cameroon) Nzui Manto	5	197	39.4

Assists

Rank	Name	G	Ast	APG
1	(Algeria) GS Pétroliers	7	142	20.3
2	(Morocco) AS Salé	7	133	19
3	(Angola) Recreativo do Libolo	7	132	18.9
4	(Egypt) Al Ahly	7	131	18.7
5	(Uganda) City Oilers	5	89	17.8
6	(Tunisia) Club Africain	7	123	17.6
7	(Angola) 1º de Agosto	7	105	15
8	(Nigeria) Kano Pillars	7	96	13.7
9	(Cameroon) BEAC	7	87	12.4
10	(Cameroon) Nzui Manto	5	57	11.4

Steals

Rank	Name	G	Sts	SPG
1	(Nigeria) Kano Pillars	7	68	9.7
2	(Uganda) City Oilers	5	47	9.4
3	(Cameroon) BEAC	7	61	8.7
4	(Cameroon) Nzui Manto	5	43	8.6
5	(Tunisia) Club Africain	7	54	7.7
6	(Angola) Recreativo do Libolo	7	54	7.7
6	(Egypt) Al Ahly	7	48	6.9
8	(Morocco) AS Salé	7	47	6.7
9	(Algeria) GS Pétroliers	7	42	6
10	(Angola) 1º de Agosto	7	41	5.9

Blocks

Rank	Name	G	Bks	BPG
1	(Egypt) Al Ahly	7	25	3.6
2	(Tunisia) Club Africain	7	19	2.7
3	(Algeria) GS Pétroliers	7	17	2.4
4	(Uganda) City Oilers	5	12	2.4
5	(Morocco) AS Salé	7	15	2.1
6	(Cameroon) BEAC	7	15	2.1
7	(Cameroon) Nzui Manto	5	10	2
7	(Angola) 1º de Agosto	7	13	1.9
9	(Angola) Recreativo do Libolo	7	12	1.7
10	(Nigeria) Kano Pillars	7	11	1.6

Turnovers

Rank	Name	G	Tos	TPG
1	(Morocco) AS Salé	7	124	17.7
2	(Cameroon) BEAC	7	110	15.7
3	(Uganda) City Oilers	5	78	15.6
4	(Cameroon) Nzui Manto	5	78	15.6
5	(Nigeria) Kano Pillars	7	107	15.3
6	(Tunisia) Club Africain	7	105	15
7	(Algeria) GS Pétroliers	7	98	14
8	(Egypt) Al Ahly	7	97	13.9
9	(Angola) 1º de Agosto	7	94	13.4
10	(Angola) Recreativo do Libolo	7	62	8.9

2-point field goal percentage

Pos	Name	A	M	%
1	(Morocco) AS Salé	299	157	52.5
2	(Algeria) GS Pétroliers	315	162	51.4
3	(Egypt) Al Ahly	224	111	49.6
4	(Angola) Recreativo do Libolo	290	141	48.6
5	(Tunisia) Club Africain	312	145	46.5
6	(Angola) 1º de Agosto	217	99	45.6
7	(Uganda) City Oilers	202	91	45
8	(Nigeria) Kano Pillars	291	116	39.9
9	(Cameroon) Nzui Manto	222	87	39.2
10	(Cameroon) BEAC	318	113	35.5

3-point field goal percentage

Pos	Name	A	M	%
1	(Morocco) AS Salé	108	42	38.9
2	(Tunisia) Club Africain	142	51	35.9
3	(Angola) Recreativo do Libolo	223	73	32.7
4	(Egypt) Al Ahly	208	66	31.7
5	(Angola) 1º de Agosto	219	67	30.6
5	(Cameroon) Nzui Manto	116	35	30.2
7	(Nigeria) Kano Pillars	190	55	28.9
8	(Algeria) GS Pétroliers	150	42	28
9	(Uganda) City Oilers	145	37	25.5
10	(Cameroon) BEAC	142	36	25.4

Free throw percentage

Pos	Name	A	M	%
1	(Angola) Recreativo do Libolo	110	80	72.7
2	(Egypt) Al Ahly	143	103	72
3	(Tunisia) Club Africain	148	104	70.3
4	(Nigeria) Kano Pillars	188	127	67.6
5	(Algeria) GS Pétroliers	144	96	66.7
6	(Morocco) AS Salé	202	133	65.8
7	(Cameroon) Nzui Manto	112	73	65.2
8	(Angola) 1º de Agosto	171	106	62
9	(Cameroon) BEAC	198	111	56.1
10	(Uganda) City Oilers	87	45	51.7

=== Team Game highs ===
Department	Name	Total	Opponent
Points	(Angola) Rec do Libolo	98	(Uganda) City Oilers
Rebounds	(Morocco) AS Salé (Cameroon) BEAC	55	(Algeria) GS Pétroliers (Uganda) City Oilers
Assists	(Egypt) Al Ahly	33	(Nigeria) Kano Pillars
Steals	(Uganda) City Oilers	14	(Cameroon) BEAC
Blocks	(Tunisia) Club Africain	7	(Cameroon) Nzui Manto
2-point field goal percentage	(Morocco) AS Salé	73% (27/37)	(Cameroon) BEAC
3-point field goal percentage	(Morocco) AS Salé	58.3% (7/12)	(Angola) Recreativo do Libolo
Free throw percentage	(Angola) Recreativo do Libolo	100% (16/16)	(Algeria) GS Pétroliers
Turnovers	(Uganda) City Oilers	26	(Cameroon) BEAC

== All Tournament Team ==
G	(United States)	Wayne Arnold
G	(United States)	Je'Kel Foster
F	(Morocco)	Abdelhakim Zouita
F	(Egypt)	Tarek El-Ghannam
C	(Angola)	Valdelício Joaquim

2016 FIBA Africa Clubs Champions Cup

Al Ahly
1st title

Most Valuable Player
(United States) Wayne Arnold

== See also ==
- 2015 AfroBasket
