= Wayne Arnold =

American professional basketball player

Personal information
- Born: May 16, 1984 (age 42) Lilburn, Georgia, U.S.
- Listed height: 6 ft 4 in (1.93 m)
- Listed weight: 93 kg (205 lb)

Career information
- High school: Berkmar (Lilburn, Georgia)
- College: Georgia (2002–2003); Los Angeles CC (2003–2004); Tennessee State (2004–2006)
- NBA draft: 2006: undrafted
- Playing career: 2006–2020
- Position: Guard / forward
- Number: 0, 8, 9, 34

Career history
- 2006: Los Angeles Defenders
- 2006–2007: Haukar
- 2007-2008: Kapfenberg Bulls
- 2009-2012: Hamamatsu Phoenix
- 2012-2013: Shiga Lakestars
- 2013–2014: Petro de Luanda
- 2014–2015: Iwate Big Bulls
- 2015–2016: Shiga Lakestars
- 2016: Niigata Albirex
- 2016: Al Ahly
- 2016–2017: Al Gharafa Doha
- 2017–2020: AS Salé
- 2020: Zamalek

Career highlights
- BJ League Japan Champion (2010); BJ League Japan Champion (2011); BJ League Japan 6th Man of the Year (2010-2011); FIBA Africa Cup Champion (2016); FIBA Africa Cup MVP (2016); FIBA Africa Cup Champion (2017); FIBA Africa Cup 1st-Team All Tournament (2017); Ohio Valley Conference 1st Team All Conference (2006); NJCAA D1 1st Team All-American (2003-2004); CCCAA Player of the Year (2003-2004); GHSA Back to Back State Title (2000-2001); USA Today All-American (2001-2002); Mr. Georgia Basketball (2002)

Wayne Arnold (born May 16, 1984) is an American former professional basketball player. He played college basketball for the Georgia Bulldogs, Los Angeles City College, and the Tennessee State Tigers. For most of his pro career, Arnold played for teams in Japan. His greatest accomplishment was being elected the Most Valuable Player at the 2016 FIBA Africa Club Championship in Cairo, Egypt.

In February 2020, Arnold signed with Zamalek for the 2020 BAL season. However, the BAL season was cancelled due to the COVID-19 pandemic outbreak.
