= BEAC Basketball =

Basketball team in Yaoundé, Cameroon

BEAC
- Nickname: Bankers
- Leagues: Youzou Elite Messieurs
- Location: Yaoundé, Cameroon
- Main sponsor: MTN Cameroun, bet pawa , Youzou
- Head coach: Ethel Charles Essimbi
- Ownership: Bank of Central African States
- Championships: 7 (1995, 2002, 2003, 2009, 2017, 2018,2025)

BEAC Basketball is a Cameroonian basketball club based in Yaoundé. It is the basketball team of the Bank of Central African States (BEAC) and played in the Youzou Elite Messieurs, the highest level in Cameroon.

BEAC has won national championships in 1995, 2002, 2003, 2009, 2017, 2018 and 2025 . In 2018, the bank decided to shut down its basketball team due to financial trouble as there was a lot of pressure on Central African banks at that time. The team returned to play in 2021.

BEAC played in the 2016 FIBA Africa Clubs Champions Cup, where it finished in seventh place.

== Honours ==
- Youzou Elite Messieurs

Champions (7): 1995, 2002, 2003, 2009, 2016–17, 2017–18 , 2025
Runners-up (3): 2006, 2008, 2015

- Cameroonian Cup

Champions (6): 2003, 2006, 2011, 2016, 2017, 2023

== Notable players ==
- (Cameroon) Cédric Tsangue (8 seasons: 2010–19)
- (Cameroon) Valentin Lélé (2024-2025)
