= Markeith Cummings =

American professional basketball player

No. 0 – Dorados de Chihuahua
- Position: Small forward
- League: LNBP

Personal information
- Born: December 21, 1988 (age 37) Birmingham, Alabama, U.S.
- Listed height: 6 ft 6 in (1.98 m)
- Listed weight: 240 lb (109 kg)

Career information
- High school: Beach (Savannah, Georgia); Genesis One Christian School (Mendenhall, Mississippi)
- College: Kennesaw State (2009–2013)
- NBA draft: 2013: undrafted
- Playing career: 2013–present

Career history
- 2013: GlobalPort Batang Pier
- 2013–2014: Bakersfield Jam
- 2014–2015: Westchester Knicks
- 2015: Sioux Falls Skyforce
- 2015: Savannah Storm
- 2015–2016: Polski Cukier Toruń
- 2016: Al Ahly
- 2017: Sioux Falls Skyforce
- 2017: Champville SC
- 2017: Kia Picanto
- 2017–2018: Seoul Samsung Thunders
- 2018: Panionios
- 2018–2019: Nagoya Diamond Dolphins
- 2019–2020: Levanga Hokkaido
- 2021–2022: Szolnoki Olaj
- 2022–2023: Élan Béarnais Pau-Orthez
- 2023: Abejas de León
- 2024: Petro de Luanda
- 2024–2025: Shiga Lakes
- 2025–2026: Flamengo
- 2026–present: Dorados de Chihuahua

Career highlights
- BAL champion (2024); FIBA Africa Clubs Champions Cup winner (2016); 3× Second-team All-Atlantic Sun (2010–2012); Atlantic Sun All-Freshman Team (2010)

Markeith Terrell Cummings (born December 21, 1988) is an American professional basketball player for Dorados de Chihuahua of the Liga Nacional de Baloncesto Profesional (LNBP). He played college basketball for Kennesaw State University.

== High school career ==
Cummings attended Alfred E. Beach High School in Savannah, Georgia, where he was a three-time Chatham County first-team All-City honoree with the basketball team, a standout quarterback for the football team, and played catcher and center field for the baseball team. As a junior in 2005–06, he led the Beach basketball team to a 27–6 record and a berth in the Region 3-AAAAA Championship Game. As a senior in 2006–07, he averaged 14.3 points and 5.3 rebounds per game as he and future college teammate LaDaris Green led Beach to 28 wins and the Class AAAAA state basketball quarter-finals. He subsequently earned Savannah Morning News first-team All-Greater Savannah honors and was selected to represent the South All-Stars in the Georgia Athletic Coaches Association (GACA) high school all-star game.

== College career ==
=== Freshman year ===
Cummings arrived at Kennesaw State after a very successful prep career at Beach High School and a postgraduate year at Genesis One Christian School in Mendenhall, Mississippi, teaming with fellow Owl LaDaris Green at both schools. After he and Green redshirted the 2008–09 season, both players began their freshman seasons in 2009–10. Cummings made an immediate impact as a redshirt freshman as he appeared in all 33 games with 31 starting assignments. He earned second-team All-Atlantic Sun Conference and Atlantic Sun All-Freshman team honors after averaging 17.4 points, 6.1 rebounds, 2.1 assists and 0.9 steals in 34.0 minutes per game. He totalled a career-high 575 points, tallied double figures 32 times, led the Owls in scoring 21 times and earned Player of the Week honors two times. Despite being a freshman, his career high of 32 points scored on December 2, 2009, against Belmont was never eclipsed in his four-year career.

=== Sophomore year ===
As a sophomore in 2010–11, Cummings earned second-team All-Atlantic Sun Conference for a second straight season, led the A-Sun with a single-season career-high 18.3 points in 31 games (30 starts) while also contributing 5.0 rebounds, 1.8 assists and 1.5 steals in 35.5 minutes per game. He had a streak of 20 straight double-digit scoring games, scored 20 or more points a school Division I-record 14 times, led the Owls in scoring 17 times and earned Player of the Week honors once after scoring a season-high 31 points on 9-of-19 shooting and dishing out a personal-best six assists against Campbell on February 7, 2011.

=== Junior year ===
As a junior in 2011–12, Cummings earned second-team All-Atlantic Sun Conference for a third straight season after ranking second in the A-Sun in scoring with 15.4 points per game. After winning the A-Sun preseason player of the year and scoring 18 points in the season opener against Wisconsin, Cummings was suspended indefinitely by the school for "conduct detrimental to the team" and consequently missed the Owls' November 14 game against Auburn. However, Cummings returned from a one-game suspension on November 18 to score 21 points off the bench, leading Kennesaw State to a 65–59 victory over Chattanooga for Lewis Preston's first head coaching victory. He went on to record 25 double-digit scoring games while leading the Owls in scoring 12 times. On February 20, he tied a season-high 27 points against Jacksonville. In 30 games (29 starts), he also contributed 5.3 rebounds, 2.1 assists and 1.1 steals in 34.8 minutes per game.

=== Senior year ===
As a senior in 2012–13, Cummings became Kennesaw State's all-time leading scorer with 2,048 points as he finished his career fourth on the A-Sun Conference's all-time points list and just the sixth player in conference history to reach the 2,000-point plateau. He passed former leader Herman Smith (1986–90, 1,683 points) on November 18 with 13 points against Towson. The previous night, he scored a season-high 31 points against Radford. On January 15, he earned his fourth career Player of the Week honor and ended his senior campaign averaging 16.5 points per game. In 27 games (20 starts), he also contributed 4.4 rebounds, 1.4 assists ad 1.0 steals in 33.0 minutes per game.

On May 16, 2013, Cummings graduated from Kennesaw State University with a Bachelor of Science degree in Health and Human Services.

=== College statistics ===
Year	Team	GP	GS	MPG	FG%	3P%	FT%	RPG	APG	SPG	BPG	PPG
2009–10	Kennesaw State	33	31	34.0	.455	.337	.717	6.1	2.1	.9	.2	17.4
2010–11	Kennesaw State	31	30	35.5	.456	.211	.672	5.0	1.8	1.5	.1	18.3
2011–12	Kennesaw State	30	29	34.8	.453	.318	.643	5.3	2.1	1.1	.6	15.4
2012–13	Kennesaw State	27	20	33.0	.454	.306	.709	4.4	1.4	1.0	.1	16.5
Career		121	110	34.4	.455	.300	.684	5.2	1.9	1.1	.3	16.9

== Professional career ==
=== Philippines (2013) ===
In July 2013, Cummings signed with the GlobalPort Batang Pier as an import for the 2013 PBA Governors' Cup. In his PBA debut on August 14, he recorded 37 points and 11 rebounds to lead GlobalPort to a win over Air21 Express to open the Governors' Cup. He helped the team reach the quarter-finals where they lost to the Rain or Shine Elasto Painters on September 26. In 10 games for GlobalPort, he averaged 28.7 points, 9.8 rebounds, 2.8 assists and 1.6 steals per game.

=== NBA D-League (2013–2015) ===
On November 1, 2013, Cummings was selected by the Bakersfield Jam in the third round of the 2013 NBA Development League Draft. He went on to make his D-League debut in the season opener on November 22 against the Idaho Stampede, scoring 14 points on 6-of-9 shooting off the bench in a 121–113 loss. Despite an impressive debut, Cummings' role and subsequent minutes with the Jam began to drop over the course of the season as he appeared in just 28 out of 50 games while averaging 6.2 points and 1.6 rebounds in 12.2 minutes per game. He scored a season-high 24 points on 9-of-13 shooting off the bench on March 28 against the Los Angeles D-Fenders. Despite his limited opportunities in 2013–14, he was selected to participate in the NBA Development League's fifth-annual Elite Mini Camp in Chicago on May 12 and May 13.

On November 2, 2014, Cummings was reacquired by the Bakersfield Jam. On November 19, he was waived by the Jam after appearing in just two games. On December 11, he was acquired by the Westchester Knicks. After playing just eight minutes in his first two games for the Knicks, Cummings played 31 minutes off the bench against the Canton Charge on December 17 and scored a game-high 21 points in an 82–75 loss. He went on to average 12.6 points per game over the next five games before falling out of coach Kevin Whitted's rotation and eventually being released by the Knicks on February 17, 2015. In 19 games for the Knicks, he averaged 7.1 points, 2.2 rebounds and 1.4 assists per game. On March 18, he was acquired by the Sioux Falls Skyforce, and went on to make his debut for the team two days later against his former team the Westchester Knicks. In 25 minutes off the bench, he scored 12 points on 5-of-7 shooting to help the Skyforce defeat the Knicks, 112–96. In 11 games for Sioux Falls, he averaged 5.3 points and 1.7 rebounds per game.

Following the 2014–15 D-League season, Cummings spent time with the Savannah Storm of the East Coast Basketball League.

=== Poland (2015–2016) ===
On August 13, 2015, Cummings signed with Polski Cukier Toruń of the Polish Basketball League. On October 11, 2015, he made his debut for Toruń, scoring 12 points in a win over Turów Zgorzelec. On November 22, he scored a season-high 21 points in a win over Starogard Gdański. He topped that mark on March 12, 2016, scoring 28 points on 10-of-12 shooting in a win over Siarka Tarnobrzeg. In 36 games for Toruń in 2015–16, he averaged 10.5 points, 3.6 rebounds and 1.3 assists per game.

=== Egypt (2016) ===
On November 26, 2016, Cummings signed with Egyptian club Al Ahly for the FIBA Africa Clubs Champions Cup. He helped Al Ahly win the tournament, and in the seven games, he averaged 12.6 points, 5.1 rebounds and 3.3 assists while shooting 47.4 percent from the field, 38.5 percent from three-point range and 73.3 percent from the free throw line.

=== Return to the D-League (2017) ===
On January 26, 2017, Cummings was acquired by the Sioux Falls Skyforce of the NBA Development League, returning to the team for a second stint. On February 21, 2017, he was waived by the Skyforce after appearing in seven games.

=== Lebanon (2017) ===
After negotiating with Lebanese club Champville SC in January 2017, Cummings joined the team in late February following his departure from the Skyforce. In nine games for Champville, he averaged 18.8 points, 5.6 rebounds and 2.7 assists per game.

=== Return to the Philippines (2017) ===
On July 15, 2017, Cummings signed with the Kia Picanto of the Philippine Basketball Association as their reinforcement for the 2017 PBA Governors' Cup. In seven games, he averaged 27.3 points, 8.6 rebounds, 2.9 assists and 1.0 steals per game.

=== Korea and Greece (2017–2018) ===
In August 2017, Cummings joined Seoul Samsung Thunders of the Korean Basketball League to replace Michael Craig. In March 2018, he left Korea and signed with Panionios of the Greek Basket League for the rest of the season. In 53 games for Seoul, he averaged 19.3 points and 5.3 rebounds per game. In eight games for Panionios, he averaged 17.1 points, 4.0 rebounds and 1.0 steals per game.

=== Japan (2018–2020) ===
On August 1, 2018, Cummings signed with Nagoya Diamond Dolphins of the Japanese B.League. On March 26, 2019, he parted ways with the club. In 36 games, he averaged 23.2 points, 6.5 rebounds, 3.2 assists and 1.0 steals per game.

On July 3, 2019, Cummings signed with Levanga Hokkaido. In 29 games, he averaged 23.3 points, 5.0 rebounds, 3.4 assists and 1.2 steals per game.

=== Hungary (2021–2022) ===
On September 7, 2021, Cummings signed with Szolnoki Olaj of the Hungarian NB I/A.

=== France (2022–2023) ===
On September 7, 2022, Cummings signed with Élan Béarnais Pau-Orthez of the French Pro A.

=== Mexico (2023) ===
Between August and November 2023, Cummings played 38 games for Abejas de León of the Mexican LNBP.

=== Angola (2024) ===
On February 26, 2024, Cummings signed with Petro de Luanda of the Basketball Africa League (BAL) and the Angolan Basketball League. The team reached the 2024 BAL final, where he scored 20 points to helped them win the championship with a victory over Al-Ahly Ly.

=== Japan (2024–2025) ===
On July 11, 2024, Cummings signed with Shiga Lakes of the Japanese B.League.

=== Brazil (2025–2026) ===
On July 9, 2025, Cummings signed with Flamengo of the Novo Basquete Brasil (NBB).

=== Return to Mexico (2026–present) ===
In July 2026, Cummings joined Dorados de Chihuahua of the Mexican LNBP.

== Personal life ==
Cummings is the son of Terrell Cummings and Matilda Steele, and has a brother, Jaden.

== BAL career statistics ==
Legend
GP	Games played	GS	Games started	MPG	Minutes per game
FG%	Field goal percentage	3P%	3-point field goal percentage	FT%	Free throw percentage
RPG	Rebounds per game	APG	Assists per game	SPG	Steals per game
BPG	Blocks per game	PPG	Points per game	**Bold**	Career high
†	Won an BAL championship

Year	Team	GP	GS	MPG	FG%	3P%	FT%	RPG	APG	SPG	BPG	PPG
2024†	Petro de Luanda	8	2	18.0	.413	.211	.500	3.8	1.1	0.3	0.0	7.9
