= Julius Coles Jr. =

American professional basketball player

No. 6 – Al-Muharraq
- Position: Shooting guard / point guard

Personal information
- Born: January 15, 1989 (age 37) Harlem, New York
- Listed height: 6 ft 4 in (1.93 m)
- Listed weight: 193 lb (88 kg)

Career information
- High school: Fessenden; Blair Academy
- College: Canisius (2007–2011)
- NBA draft: 2011: undrafted

Career history
- 2012–2013: Schwelm
- 2013–2014: HKK Široki
- 2014–2015: Lirija
- 2015: Ittihad Tanger
- 2015: Prishtina
- 2019–2021: Al-Wakrah
- 2022: US Monastir
- 2022: Al Morog
- 2022–2023: Al Bataeh Club
- 2023–present: Al-Muharraq

Career highlights
- BAL champion (2022); Qatari Cup winner (2020)

Julius V Coles Jr. (born January 15, 1989) is an American professional basketball player who plays for Al Bataeh Club in the UAE National Basketball League. He played college basketball for the Canisius Golden Griffins. Coles Jr. played for US Monastir when they won the 2022 BAL championship.

== Professional career ==
Coles Jr. signed his first professional contract in 2012, with the German team EN Baskets Schwelm of the national third level. The following season, he played for HKK Široki of the Basketball Championship of Bosnia and Herzegovina.

In the 2014–15 season, Coles Jr. played for Lirija in Macedonia. He then moved to Ittihad Tanger in the Moroccan Division Excellence. In January 2015, Coles Jr. signed with KB Prishtina.

In 2019, Coles Jr. signed for Al-Wakrah of the Qatari Basketball League. He helped them win the 2020 Qatar Cup after scoring 19 points in the final against Al-Gharafa.

Coles Jr. joined Tunisian club US Monastir in May 2022, ahead of the 2022 BAL Playoffs. He went on to win the BAL championship with Monastir, starting and contributing 6 points and 4 assists in the finals.

On June 1, 2022, Coles Jr. joined Al Morog of the Libyan Division I. In October 2023, Coles made his debut for Bahraini club Al-Muharraq in the 2023 Arab Club Basketball Championship.

== Personal ==
Coles Jr. is the son of Sonya Pittman. He earned an undergraduate degree in communications in 2010.
