= Ibrahim Fofana =

Ivorian footballer (born 2002)

Personal information
- Full name: Ibrahim Cheick Junior Fofana
- Date of birth: 2 October 2003 (age 23)
- Place of birth: Divo, Ivory Coast
- Height: 1.87 m (6 ft 2 in)
- Position: Midfielder

Team information
- Current team: Westerlo
- Number: 45

Senior career*
Years	Team	Apps	(Gls)
2022–2023	Amiens B	36	(3)
2022–2026	Amiens	57	(1)
2026–	Westerlo	2	(0)

International career
2023	Ivory Coast U23	4	(0)
- * Club domestic league appearances and goals as of 15 August 2026

Ibrahim Cheick Junior Fofana (born 2 October 2003) is an Ivorian professional footballer who plays as a midfielder for Belgian Pro League club Westerlo.

== Club career ==
In January 2022, Fofana joined French club Amiens. In his debut season with the club's senior team during the 2022–23 campaign, he made six Ligue 2 appearances. On 30 June 2023, he signed his first professional contract, a deal lasting until 2026. On 8 September 2023, it was announced that Fofana had suffered an anterior cruciate ligament injury.

In July 2026, Fofana joined Belgian Pro League club Westerlo from Amiens SC on a four-year contract. The Ivorian midfielder said Westerlo's sporting project and its reputation for developing players convinced him to continue his career in Belgium. The move was officially confirmed by Westerlo on 22 July 2026

== International career ==
On 4 June 2023, Fofana was included in Ivory Coast's under-23 squad for the Maurice Revello Tournament.
