= Josh Nzeakor =

American-Nigerian basketball player

No. 1 – Cedi Osman Basket
- Position: Power forward
- League: Türkiye Basketbol Ligi

Personal information
- Born: June 13, 1997 (age 29) Mesquite, Texas, U.S.
- Listed height: 6 ft 8 in (2.03 m)
- Listed weight: 225 lb (102 kg)

Career information
- High school: Mesquite (Mesquite, Texas)
- College: Lamar (2015–2019)
- NBA draft: 2019: undrafted
- Playing career: 2019–present

Career history
- 2019–2020: PS Karlsruhe Lions
- 2020–2021: Atenas
- 2021: AS Police
- 2021–2022: Memphis Hustle
- 2022: SLAC
- 2022: Correcaminos UAT Victoria
- 2022–2023: Texas Legends
- 2023: Birmingham Squadron
- 2023: Béliers de Kemper
- 2023: Texas Legends
- 2024: Santa Cruz Warriors
- 2024: Westchester Knicks
- 2024: Birmingham Squadron
- 2024–2026: Prishtina
- 2026–present: Cedi Osman Basket

Career highlights
- Second-team All-Southland (2019)

Jawachi "Joshua" Nzeakor (born June 13, 1997) is an American-Nigerian professional basketball player for Cedi Osman Basket of the Türkiye Basketbol Ligi (TBL). He played college basketball for the Lamar Cardinals.

== Professional career ==
Nzeakor signed with Malian club AS Police of the Basketball Africa League (BAL).

A year later, Nzeakor joined the Memphis Hustle of the NBA G League. On January 10, 2022, he recorded 6 points and 7 rebounds in his debut during a 132–130 defeat to the Santa Cruz Warriors.

In March 2022, Nzeakor signed with Guinean club SLAC ahead of the second season of the BAL.

On July 28, 2022, he joined Correcaminos UAT Victoria of the Liga Nacional de Baloncesto Profesional (LNBP).

=== Texas Legends (2022–2023) ===
On November 3, 2022, Nzeakor was named to the opening night of the Texas Legends. On January 23, 2023, Nzeakor was waived.

=== Birmingham Squadron (2023) ===
On January 25, 2023, Nzeakor was acquired by the Birmingham Squadron.

=== Béliers de Kemper (2023) ===
On April 12, 2023, Nzeakor signed with Béliers de Kemper of the LNB Pro B.

=== Return to Texas (2023) ===
On October 30, 2023, Nzeakor re-signed with the Birmingham Squadron, but was waived on November 9. On November 27, he re-signed with the Texas Legends, but was waived on December 9. However, two days later, he re-signed with the Legends, but was waived again on December 28.

=== Santa Cruz Warriors (2024) ===
On January 2, 2024, Nzeakor joined the Santa Cruz Warriors, but was waived six days later.

=== Westchester Knicks (2024) ===
On January 11, 2024, Nzeakor joined the Westchester Knicks, but was waived five days later.

=== Return to Birmingham (2024) ===
On January 19, 2024, Nzeakor rejoined the Birmingham Squadron.

=== Sigal Prishtina Mercure (2024–present) ===
On September 3, 2024, Nzeakor signed with Sigal Prishtina Mercure of the Kosovo Superleague, the Kosovo Cup, the Balkan League and the Liga Unike.

== BAL career statistics ==
Legend
GP	Games played	GS	Games started	MPG	Minutes per game
FG%	Field goal percentage	3P%	3-point field goal percentage	FT%	Free throw percentage
RPG	Rebounds per game	APG	Assists per game	SPG	Steals per game
BPG	Blocks per game	PPG	Points per game	**Bold**	Career high

Year	Team	GP	GS	MPG	FG%	3P%	FT%	RPG	APG	SPG	BPG	PPG
2021	Police	3	3	31.7	**.565**	.167	**.692**	**8.3**	**2.0**	0.0	**0.3**	**20.7**
2022	SLAC	**5**	**5**	**32.6**	.417	**.182**	.615	6.2	1.6	**0.6**	0.0	13.6
