= Cameroonian Basketball Cup =

Annual basketball competition in Cameroon

- Organising body: Cameroon Basketball Federation
- Founded: 1983
- First season: 1983
- Countries: Cameroon
- Confederation: FIBA Africa
- Current champions: FAP (2nd title) (2024)
- Most championships: BEAC (7 titles)

The Cameroonian Basketball Cup (French: Coupe du Cameroon de Basketball) is an annual basketball cup competition contested in Cameroon. The competition is organised by the Cameroon Basketball Federation (Fécabasket).

The tournament is hosted since 1983. BEAC holds the record for most Cup titles, having won at least seven championships.

== Winners ==
| Year | Winners | Runners-up | Finals score | Ref. |
|---|---|---|---|---|
| 1983 | VAT 69 | | | |
| 1984 | | Zenith | | |
| 1985 | | | | |
| 1986 | Zenith | | | |
| 1987 | | | | |
| 1988 | | Zenith | | |
| 1989 | | Challenger | | |
| 1990 | | | | |
| 1991 | | | | |
| 1992 | | | | |
| 1993 | Dreamstore | | | |
| 1994 | Dreamstore | | | |
| 1995 | Dreamstore | Ecole de Basket | | |
| 1996 | | | | |
| 1997 | | | | |
| 1998 | | | | |
| 1999 | Athletic Warriors | | | |
| 2000 | | | | |
| 2001 | | | | |
| 2002 | | | | |
| 2003 | BEAC | | | |
| 2004 | | | | |
| 2005 | | | | |
| 2006 | BEAC | Noga Air Force | | |
| 2007 | | | | |
| 2008 | BEAC | Condor | 82–70 | |
| 2009 | | | | |
| 2010 | Condor | Far Compet de Yaoundé | 71–64 | |
| 2011 | BEAC | Phoenix | 78–63 | |
| 2012 | | | | |
| 2013 | INJS | BEAC | 65–57 | |
| 2014 | All Stars de Bamenda | BEAC | 67–55 | |
| 2015 | All Stars de Bamenda | Ecole de Basket | 70–53 | |
| 2016 | BEAC | Nzui-Manto | 48–45 | |
| 2017 | BEAC | Nzui-Manto | 78–75 | |
| 2018 | | | | |
| 2019 | Condor | Ecole de Basket | 97–93 | |
| 2020 | Not held | | | |
| 2021 | Not held | | | |
| 2022 | FAP | Ecole de Basket | 103–59 | |
| 2023 | BEAC | AS Bonaberi | 73–59 | |
| 2024 | FAP | Alph de Yaoundé | 75–68 | |

== Titles by team ==
| Team | Winners | Finalist | Winning seasons | Runners-up seasons |
|---|---|---|---|---|
| BEAC | 7 | 2 | 2003, 2006, 2008, 2011, 2016, 2017, 2023 | 2013, 2014 |
| Dreamstore^{†} | 3 | – | 1993, 1994, 1995 | – |
| Condor | 2 | 1 | 2010, 2019 | 2008 |
| All Stars de Bamenda | 2 | – | 2014, 2015 | – |
| Zenith | 1 | 2 | 1989 | 1984, 1988 |
| VAT 69 | 1 | – | 1983 | – |
| Athletic Warriors | 1 | – | 1999 | – |
| INJS | 1 | – | 2013 | – |
| FAP | 2 | – | 2022, 2024 | – |
| Ecole de Basket | – | 4 | – | 1995, 2015, 2019, 2022 |
| Nzui-Manto | – | 2 | – | 2016, 2017 |
| Challenger | – | 1 | – | 1989 |
| Far Compet de Yaoundé | – | 1 | – | 2010 |
| Noga Air Force | – | 1 | – | 2006 |
| AS Bonaberi | – | 1 | – | 2023 |
| Alph de Yaoundé | – | 1 | – | 2024 |
^{†} Defunct club.

== MVP Award ==
| Year | Winner | Team | Ref. |
|---|---|---|---|
| 2023 | Étienne Tametong | BEAC | |
| 2024 | Étienne Tametong | KSA | |
