= Bechir Hadidane =

Tunisian basketball player

No. 10 – Ezzahra Sports
- Position: Center
- League: TBL

Personal information
- Born: August 18, 1984 (age 42) Nabeul, Tunisia
- Listed height: 6 ft 7 in (2.01 m)

Career information
- Playing career: 2003–present

Career history
- 2003–2011: Stade Nabeulien
- 2011–2012: Étoile Sportive du Sahel
- 2012: →Club Africain
- 2012–2013: Stade Nabeulien
- 2013–2017: Club Africain
- 2017–2018: US Monastir
- 2018–2019: Stade Nabeulien
- 2019–2021: Club Africain
- 2021–2022: Stade Nabeulien
- 2022–present: Ezzahra Sports
Medals
Men's basketball
Representing Tunisia
AfroBasket
Gold medal – first place	2017 Tunisia/Senegal

Bechir Hadidane (born August 18, 1984) is a Tunisian basketball player for Ezzahra Sports and the Tunisian national team.

He participated at the AfroBasket 2017.
