= Islando Manuel =

Angolan basketball player

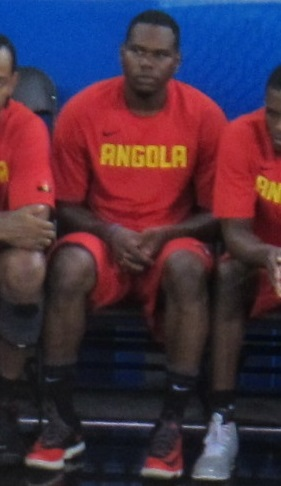
- Manuel with Angola in 2014

No. 18 – Interclube
- Position: Power forward
- League: Angolan Basketball League

Personal information
- Born: 7 January 1991 (age 35) Luanda, Angola
- Listed height: 6 ft 4 in (1.93 m)
- Listed weight: 196 lb (89 kg)

Career information
- Playing career: 2009–present

Career history
- 2009–2023: Primeiro de Agosto
- 2023–present: Interclube

Career highlights
- 3× Angolan League champion (2010, 2013, 2016); 3× Angolan Cup champion (2012, 2018, 2021); 4× Angolan Supercup champion (2010–2011, 2013–2014); Lusophonic Supercup champion (2011)
Medals
Men's Basketball
Representing Angola
FIBA Africa Under-18 Championship
Silver medal – second place	Alexandria 2008	Angola U18
FIBA Africa Clubs Champions Cup
Gold medal – first place	Malabo 2012	1º de Agosto
Gold medal – first place	Sousse 2013	1º de Agosto
Silver medal – second place	Salé 2011	1º de Agosto

Islando Patrício Sebastião Manuel, a.k.a. Papá Ngulo, (born 7 January 1991), is an Angolan professional basketball player. Islando, who stands at 192 cm (6 ft 3 1/2 in), plays as a power forward.

== Professional career ==
From 2009 to 2023, Manuel plays for Angolan side Primeiro de Agosto in the Angolan Basketball League. Following a financial crisis at the Primeiro de Agosto, Manuel signed with Interclube in the 2023 offseason.

== International career ==
In May 2013, Islando was summoned for the 2013 Afrobasket preliminary Angolan squad.
