= Elite Messieurs =

Basketball league in Cameroon

Youzou Elite Messieurs
- Organising body: FECABASKET
- Country: Cameroon
- Number of teams: 8 (2025–26)
- Level on pyramid: 1
- Relegation to: Division 2
- Domestic cup: Cameroonian Basketball Cup
- International cup: Basketball Africa League (BAL)
- Current champions: BEAC (8th title) (2025–26)
- Most championships: BEAC (8 titles)
- Website: Link

The Elite Messieurs (translated to English: Elite Men), also known as Cameroon Basketball League, is the premier basketball league for clubs in Cameroon. The league consisted out of 8 teams in the 2022–23 season.

Currently, the most successful team in the league is FAP, who have won four consecutive titles between 2020 and 2023.

The champions of the Elite Messieurs qualify for the Road to BAL, the qualification tournaments of the Basketball Africa League (BAL).

In the most recent format, eight teams participated in the regular season where they face each other tea one time. The top four teams advance to the Final Four, where they play in a round-robin to determine the final standings.

== Current teams ==
The following were the 8 teams for the 2025 season:

Team	City	Established
ALP	Yaoundé	
ALPBA	Yaoundé	
BEAC	Yaoundé	
Douala Firebirds	Douala	
Ecole de Basket	Douala	1991
Falcons	Yaoundé	
FAP	Yaoundé	1972
Moungo Zone	Nkongsamba	

== Champions ==
Season	Champions	Runners-up	Third place	Ref.
1971	Yaoundé Université Club			
1972–1983	Unknown			
1984		Zenith BBC		
1985	Zenith BBC			
1986				
1987	Zenith BBC			
1988				
1989		Challenger		
1990	Challenger			
1991	Challenger			
1992	Challenger			
1993	Dreamstore BBC			
1994	Dreamstore BBC			
1995	BEAC	Dreamstore BBC		
1996	Athletic Warriors			
1997	Athletic Warriors			
1998	Athletic Warriors			
1999	Athletic Warriors			
2000				
2001	Yaoundé Université Club			
2002	BEAC			
2003	BEAC			
2005	Phoenix de Douala	Ecole de Basket		
2006	Phoenix de Douala	BEAC	Noga Air Force	
2007	Condor			
2008	Condor	BEAC		
2009	BEAC	Condor		
2010	Far Compet de Yaoundé	Ecole de Basket		
2011	Condor	INJS Yaoundé	Montagne Bafoussam	
2012	INJS			
2013	Ecole de Basket	All Stars de Bamenda	INJS Yaoundé	
2014	All Stars de Bamenda			
2015	INJS	BEAC	Nzui-Manto	
2015–16	Nzui-Manto	INJS Yaoundé	BEAC	
2016–17	BEAC	Nzui-Manto		
2017–18	BEAC			
2018–19	Condor	FAP	Ecole de Basket	
2019–20	FAP	Université de Douala	Le Nkam	
2020–21	FAP	Onyx	Le Nkam	
2021–22	FAP	Ecole de Basket	BEAC	
2022–23	FAP			
2023–24	Kadji Sports Academy	FAP	Ecole de Basket	
2024–25	BEAC	FAP	ALPH	
2025–26	BEAC	ALPH	MC Noah	

=== By team ===
Team	Titles	Winning seasons	Last season title
BEAC	8	1995, 2002, 2003, 2009, 2017, 2018, 2025, 2026	2026
Athletic Warriors^{†}	4	1996, 1997, 1998, 1999	1999
Condor	4	2007, 2008, 2011, 2019	2019
FAP	4	2020, 2021, 2022, 2023	2022
BBC Challenger^{†}	3	1990, 1991, 1992	1992
Zenith^{†}	2	1985, 1987	1987
Phoenix de Douala*	2	2005, 2006	2006
INJS	2	2012, 2015	2015
Yaoundé Université Club	2	1971, 2001	1971
Kadji Sports Academy	1	2024	2024
Nzui-Manto	1	2016	2016
Ecole de Basket	1	2013	2013
All Stars de Bamenda*	1	2014	2014
Far Compet de Yaoundé^{†}	1	2010	2010
^{†} Defunct club.* Former club, now plays in the Division 2.

== In African competitions ==
Each year, the champions of the league are placed for the qualifiers of the FIBA Africa Basketball League, the premiere pan-African competition. Since 2020, this league is replaced by the Basketball Africa League (BAL). The following list shows Cameroonian teams which played in a main tournament:

=== FIBA Africa Basketball League ===
Cameroon participants in the FIBA Africa Basketball League
Club	Participations	Last participation	Best result
BEAC	1	2016	7th place
Condor	1	2010	(silver) Runners-up
Nzui Manto	1	2015	10th place
CAMAIR	1		
ONCBP	1		

=== Basketball Africa League ===
Team	2021	2022
FAP	Quarterfinals	4th place

== Most Valuable Player ==
Season	Player	Team	Ref.
2021–22	Étienne Tametong	FAP	
