= Alexis Wangmene =

Cameroonian basketball player (born 1989)

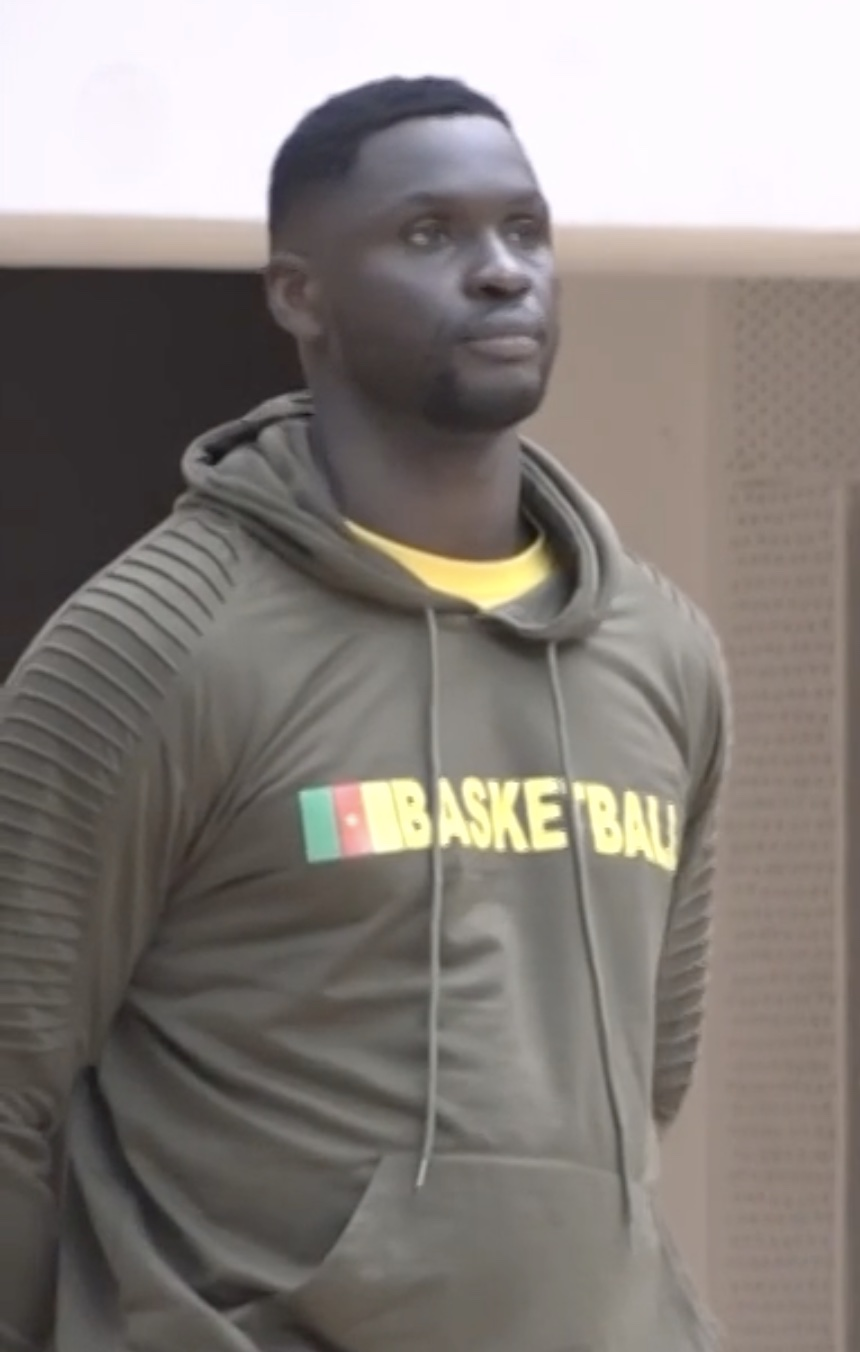
- Wangmene with FAP in 2022

Personal information
- Born: March 1, 1989 (age 37) Yaoundé, Cameroon
- Listed height: 6 ft 7 in (2.01 m)
- Listed weight: 241 lb (109 kg)

Career information
- High school: Central Catholic (San Antonio, Texas); Blair Academy (Blairstown, New Jersey)
- College: Texas (2007–2012)
- NBA draft: 2012: undrafted
- Playing career: 2012–2022
- Position: Power forward

Career history
- 2012–2013: Austin Toros
- 2013–2014: Hopsi Polzela
- 2014–2015: Krka Novo Mesto
- 2015–2016: Stal Ostrów Wielkopolski
- 2016–2017: Austin Spurs
- 2017–2018: Ylli
- 2018–2019: Liège Basket
- 2019–2020: Saint-Quentin
- 2020: Limburg United
- 2021–2022: Austin Spurs
- 2022: FAP

Career highlights
- Slovenian Cup champion (2015); Slovenian Supercup champion (2015)

Alexis Mang-Ikri Wangmene (born March 1, 1989) is a Cameroonian former professional basketball player He played college basketball for the Texas Longhorns and has represented the Cameroon national team.

== Early life ==
Wangmene was spotted by San Antonio Spurs general manager R. C. Buford at a Basketball Without Borders camp in his native Cameroon. Buford and his wife brought Wangmene to the United States and resettled him in San Antonio, where he played basketball and attended Central Catholic Marianist High School for two years. During his junior year at Central, the power forward was named to the TAPPS 6A All-State team. Following his junior year, Wangmene transferred to Blair Academy in New Jersey, from which he graduated in 2007.

== College career ==
At Texas, Wangmene missed all but four games of his sophomore year with a knee injury. In May 2009, he received a medical redshirt because of the injury and had three years of eligibility remaining prior to the 2009–10 season.

== Professional career ==
After going undrafted in the 2012 NBA draft, Wangmene joined the San Antonio Spurs for the 2012 NBA Summer League. On November 2, 2012, he was selected by the Austin Toros in the fifth round of the 2012 NBA Development League Draft. In July 2013, he re-joined the San Antonio Spurs for the 2013 NBA Summer League.

In October 2013, Wangmene signed with Slovenian team Hopsi Polzela for the 2013–14 season.

In June 2014, Wangmene signed a two-year deal with fellow Slovenian team Krka Novo Mesto. He was released by Krka in July 2015 following the 2014–15 season.

In November 2015, Wangmene with Polish team Stal Ostrów Wielkopolski.

On October 30, 2016, Wangmene was selected by the Austin Spurs in the sixth round of the 2016 NBA Development League Draft.

Wangmene signed a contract with Limburg United of the Belgian league on January 29, 2020.

On October 23, 2021, Wangmene was selected by the Austin Spurs in the second round of the 2021 NBA G League Draft with their 39th overall pick. He was then later waived on January 31, 2022.

In April 2022, Wangmene was revealed to be on the roster of Cameroon's FAP roster for the 2022 BAL season.
