= Charles Minlend Jr. =

American-Cameroonian basketball player (born 1997)

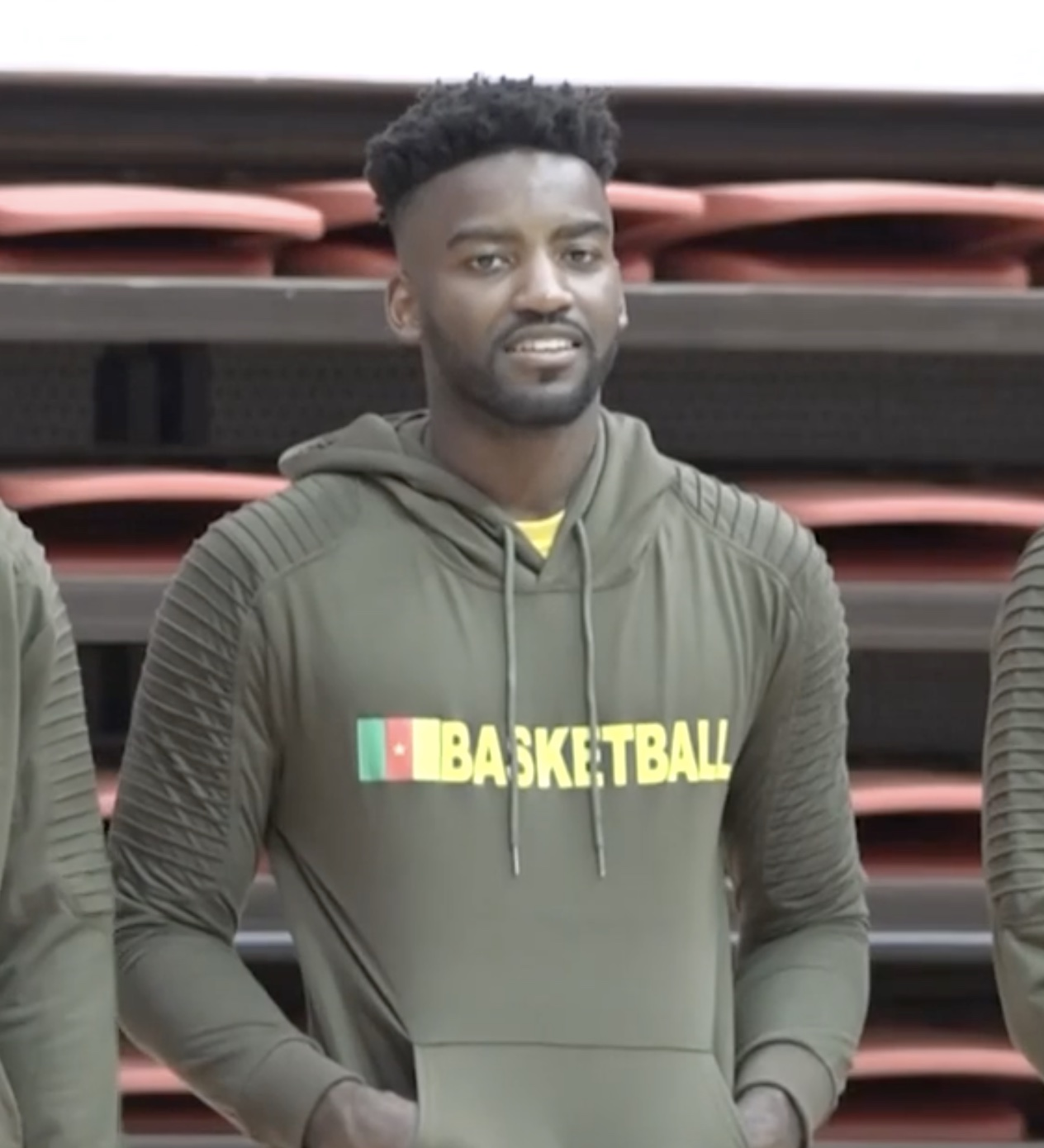
- Minlend Jr. with FAP Yaoundé in 2022

No. 2 – Metropolitans
- Position: Guard
- League: Élite 2

Personal information
- Born: December 19, 1997 (age 28) Queens, New York, U.S.
- Listed height: 6 ft 4 in (1.93 m)
- Listed weight: 220 lb (100 kg)

Career information
- High school: Fork Union Military Academy (Fork Union, Virginia); Concord Academy (Concord, North Carolina)
- College: San Francisco (2017–2020); Louisville (2020–2021)
- Playing career: 2022–present

Career history
- 2022: FAP Yaoundé
- 2022–2023: Zornotza ST
- 2023–2024: Huelva Comercio Viridis
- 2024–2025: Cimarrones del Choco
- 2025–present: Metropolitans

Career highlights
- 2× Second-team All-WCC (2019, 2020); 2× WCC All-Academic First Team (2019, 2020); WCC All-Freshman Team (2019)

Charles Alexander Minlend Jr. (born December 19, 1997) is an American-Cameroonian professional basketball player for the Metropolitans of the French Élite 2. He is the son of Charles Minlend, who played basketball professionally as well.

== Early life ==
Minlend Jr. was born in Queens, New York, and grew up in four different countries as his father Charles played there professionally. He spent the first decade of his life in France, Israel and South Korea.

== College career ==
Minlend Jr. started out with San Francisco Dons, where he averaged 14.4 points and 4.7 rebounds over his three seasons there. He was named to the All-West Coast Conference Second Team twice, in 2019 and 2020.

Minlend Jr. then transferred to the Louisville Cardinals, after he also considered Arizona, Arkansas, Butler, Gonzaga, Indiana and Mississippi State. After redshirting his first season, he attained All-WCC Freshman Team honours in 2017–18.

== Professional career ==
In May 2022, Minlend Jr. joined Cameroonian club FAP for the playoffs of the Basketball Africa League. He scored a team-high 17 points in the lost third-place game.

In August 2022, he joined the Spanish club Zornotza ST for the 2022–23 season.

For the following 2023–24 season, he played with Huelva Comercio Viridis in the LEB Plata.

Minlend Jr. joined Colombian club Cimarrones del Choco on April 25, 2024.

== National team career ==
In 2022, Minlend Jr. made his debut for the Cameroon men's national basketball team during the 2023 World Cup qualifiers.

== Personal ==
Charles' father Charles Minlend played collegiate for St. Johns before playing eleven seasons as a pro. His uncle, Raymond Minlend, played for the Davidson and St. Francis.
