= Nzui-Manto =

- League: Elite Messieurs
- Established: 2014
- History: Nzui-Manto; 2014–present
- Location: Bangangté, Cameroon

Nzui-Manto is a Cameroonian basketball club based in Bangangté. Established in 2014, the club won its first Elite Messieurs title in 2016. As the champions of Cameroon, the team made its debut on the African stage when it played in the 2016 FIBA Africa Clubs Champions Cup where they finished 10th.

The broader A.S. Nzui-Manto sports club also has other sports, such as volleyball and athletics.

== Honours ==
Elite Messieurs

- Winners (1): 2016
