= 2024–25 Nairobi City Thunder season =

The 2024–25 Nairobi City Thunder is the 25th season of the Nairobi City Thunder. The team will play in the KBF Premier League and made its debut in both the qualifying rounds and the main tournament of the Basketball Africa League (BAL).

As the national champions, they qualified for the Road to BAL, the qualifying rounds of the Basketball Africa League(BAL). In the 2024 offseason, the Thunder signed Tylor Ongwae, who joined the team after playing nine seasons in Europe. They also strengthened the roster with foreign players, including Will Davis and Uchenna Iroegbu. After advancing past the first round, the Thunder further increased their firepower by attracting continental veterans Abdoulaye Harouna and Ater Majok, who had both played in each previous BAL season. On December 2, they defeated City Oilers in the semifinals to qualify for the 2025 BAL season as the first Kenyan team in history.

In the 2025 BAL main season, they were allocated in the Nile Conference. In the meantime, star players Majok and Harouna had signed with other BAL teams. The Kenyans suffered heavy losses at the hands of Al Ahli Tripoli and APR, however, they were able to win one game against MBB, the first win by a Kenyan team. Nevertheless, the Thunder finished with a 1–5 record, leading to elimination in the group phase.

== Rosters ==
=== Road to BAL roster ===
Note: Flags indicate national team eligibility at FIBA-sanctioned events. Players may hold other non-FIBA nationalities not displayed.

Nairobi City Thunder roster
Players
Coaches

Pos.	No.	Nat.	Name	Ht.	Wt.
G	0	(United States) (Kenya)	Ogechi, Derrick	1.91 m (6 ft 3 in)	93 kg (205 lb)
	1	(South Sudan)	Diing, Garang
G	2	(United States) (Nigeria)	Iroegbu, Uchenna	1.83 m (6 ft 0 in)	82 kg (181 lb)
PG	7	(Kenya)	Wachira, Kennedy	1.78 m (5 ft 10 in)
SG	11	(Kenya)	Adera, Eugene	2.03 m (6 ft 8 in)
F	12	(Kenya)	Ongwae, Tylor	2.01 m (6 ft 7 in)	93 kg (205 lb)
PF	15	(Kenya)	Koranga, Okall	2.06 m (6 ft 9 in)
G/F	20	(United States) (Kenya)	Odero, Albert	1.96 m (6 ft 5 in)	82 kg (181 lb)
	21	(South Sudan)	Abuoch, Aboat
F/C	40	(United States)	Davis, Will	2.03 m (6 ft 8 in)	103 kg (227 lb)
C	55	(Kenya)	Okoth, Fidel	2.03 m (6 ft 8 in)
F		(Kenya)	Mwangi, James	1.98 m (6 ft 6 in)	81 kg (179 lb)
PG		(Kenya)	Ligare Wisyuba, Griffin	1.75 m (5 ft 9 in)

Head coach

- (United States) Brad Ibs

Legend

- (C) Team captain
- Injured

- Roster
Updated: December 1, 2024

=== BAL roster ===
Note: Flags indicate national team eligibility at FIBA-sanctioned events. Players may hold other non-FIBA nationalities not displayed.

Nairobi City Thunder roster
Players
Coaches

Pos.	No.	Nat.	Name	Ht.	Wt.	Age
G	1	(Central African Republic)	Ganapamo, Evans	2.01 m (6 ft 7 in)		30 – 19 August 1994
PG	2	(Nigeria)	Iroegbu, Uchenna	1.78 m (5 ft 10 in)		28 – 20 August 1996
G	4	(Kenya)	Ogechi, Derrick	1.90 m (6 ft 3 in)		26 – 26 December 1998
F	6	(United States)	Davis, Will (I)	2.06 m (6 ft 9 in)		32 – 11 September 1992
F	10	(South Sudan)	Diing, Garang	2.03 m (6 ft 8 in)		24 – 2 February 2001
PG	11	(Kenya)	Adera, Eugene	1.85 m (6 ft 1 in)		27 – 29 September 1997
PG	12	(Kenya)	Etyang, David	1.93 m (6 ft 4 in)		20 – 3 December 2004
PF	13	(Republic of the Congo)	Kabongo, Yohane	2.06 m (6 ft 9 in)		17 – 7 December 2007
G	14	(Kenya)	Odera, Albert	1.93 m (6 ft 4 in)		27 – 21 June 1997
PF	15	(Kenya)	Koranga, Ariel	2.06 m (6 ft 9 in)		35 – 18 March 1990
F	23	(Kenya)	Ongwae, Tylor	2.01 m (6 ft 7 in)		33 – 15 July 1991
C	24	(Senegal)	Diong, Cheikh	2.11 m (6 ft 11 in)		25 – 12 December 1999
PF	41	(Kenya)	Ereng, Paul	2.04 m (6 ft 8 in)		28 – 7 October 1996

Head coach

- (United States) Brad Ibs

Assistant coach(es)

- (Kenya) Rose Mkaigho Mshilla
- (United States) Mathew Binder

Legend

- (C) Team captain
- Injured

- Roster
Updated: May 13, 2025

== Games ==
=== Road to BAL ===
The Thunder entered the Road to BAL as the KBF Premier League champions.

Win Loss Fixtures

==== First round ====
Pos	Team	Pld	W	L	PF	PA	PD	Pts	Qualification
1	(Burundi) Urunani	4	4	0	247	149	+98	8	Advance to Elite 16
2	(Kenya) Nairobi City Thunder	4	3	1	359	270	+89	7	Advance to Elite 16
3	(Madagascar) GNBC	4	2	2	303	352	−49	6	
4	(Tanzania) JKT (H)	4	1	3	260	317	−57	5	
5	(Seychelles) Beau Vallon Heat	4	0	4	232	364	−132	4	

Source: FIBA
(H) Hosts

16 October 2024 1	Beau Vallon Heat (Seychelles)	53–89	(Kenya) Nairobi City Thunder	Kibaha, Tanzania
16:00	Scoring by quarter: Not reported
	Pts: Bouchereau 19; Rebs: Mutyambizi 6 Asts: Mutyambizi 8	Boxscore	Pts: Davis 28; Rebs: Davis, Okoth 11; Asts: Iroegbu 7	Arena: The Filbert Bayi Olympafrica Centre; Attendance: 200; Referees: Guy Sani (CMR), Silver Jacques Houngbedji (BEN), Didier Shema Nshuti (RWA)

18 October 2024 2	Nairobi City Thunder (Kenya)	88–89	(Burundi) Urunani	Kibaha, Tanzania
	Pts: T. Ongwae 23; Rebs: G. Diing 10; Asts: U. Iroegbu 7		Pts: J. Boissy 28; Rebs: P. Olisemeka 11; Asts: J. Boissy 9	Arena: The Filbert Bayi Olympafrica Centre

19 October 2024 3	GNBC (Madagascar)	60–96	(Kenya) Nairobi City Thunder	Kibaha, Tanzania
16:00
		Boxscore		Arena: The Filbert Bayi Olympafrica Centre; Attendance: 200

20 October 2024 4	Nairobi City Thunder (Kenya)	86–63	(Tanzania) JKT	Kibaha, Tanzania
19:00	Scoring by quarter: 18–20, 23–9, 20–23, 25–11
	Pts: Ogechi 23; Rebs: Diing 9 Asts: Ongwae 8	Boxscore	Pts: Mushi 18; Rebs: Felesian 10; Asts: Ndula 10	Arena: The Filbert Bayi Olympafrica Centre; Attendance: 160; Referees: SANI, Guy (CMR) HOUNGBEDJI, Silver Jacques (BEN) MOCKEY, Gnoambilé Guillaume (CIV)

==== Elite 16 ====
The draw for the Elite 16 was held on November 24, 2024.

===== Group stage =====
Pos	Team	Pld	W	L	PF	PA	PD	Pts	Qualification
1	(Kenya) Nairobi City Thunder (H)	3	3	0	297	198	+99	6	Advance to final round
2	(Cape Verde) Kriol Star	3	2	1	223	220	+3	5	Advance to final round
3	(South Africa) MBB	3	1	2	207	226	−19	4	
4	(Malawi) Bravehearts	3	0	3	187	270	−83	3	

Source: FIBA
(H) Hosts

28 November 2024 1	MBB (South Africa)	59–102	(Kenya) Nairobi City Thunder	Kasarani Indoor Arena, Nairobi
20:00	Scoring by quarter: 19–17, 18–31, 17–22, 5–32
	Pts: Mothiba 14; Rebs: Mokwena 12; Asts: Pfachi 6	Boxscore	Pts: Harouna 18; Rebs: Koranga 8 Asts: Iroegbu 7	Attendance: 2,000; Referees: Michel Djeugoue (CMR), Amr Zahed (EGY), Shabani Shabani (TAN)

29 November 2024 2	Nairobi City Thunder (Kenya)	104–71	(Cape Verde) Kriol Star	Kasarani Indoor Arena, Nairobi
20:00	Scoring by quarter: 24–16, 27–15, 21–17, 32–23
	Pts: Odero 15; Rebs: Okoth 11; Asts: Adera 4	Boxscore	Pts: McGlynn 17; Rebs: Enoh 11; Asts: Almeida, Richardson 3	Attendance: 1,500; Referees: Tonton Banza Kalume (COD), Mahamadou Diallo (MLI), Amr Zahed (EGY)

30 November 2024 3	Bravehearts (Malawi)	68–91	(Kenya) Nairobi City Thunder	Kasarani Indoor Arena, Nairobi
20:00	Scoring by quarter: 13–20, 20–21, 14–27, 21–23
	Pts: Williams 25; Rebs: Banda 15; Asts: Banda 2	Boxscore	Pts: Ogechi 18; Rebs: Diing 10; Asts: Iroegbu 4	Attendance: 500; Referees: Shabani Shabani (TAN), Francisco Tando (ANG), Didier Shema (RWA)

===== Final round =====
2 December 2024 Semifinals	Nairobi City Thunder (Kenya)	80–59	(Uganda) City Oilers	Nairobi, Kenya
20:30 (GMT+3)	Scoring by quarter: 18–11, 16–15, 20–19, 18–17
	Pts: Majok 17; Rebs: Majok 10; Asts: Iroegbu 7	Boxscore	Pts: Petty 23; Rebs: Otobo 11; Asts: Jones 3	Arena: Kasarani Indoor Arena; Attendance: 1,000

3 December 2024 Final	Nairobi City Thunder (Kenya)	99–86	(Cape Verde) Kriol Star	Nairobi, Kenya
20:30 (GMT+3)	Scoring by quarter: 27–22, 30–19, 23–16, 19–29
	Pts: Diing 20; Rebs: Diing 7 Asts: Adera 14	Boxscore	Pts: Richardson 26; Rebs: Mendes 15; Asts: Lahrichi 11	Arena: Kasarani Indoor Arena; Attendance: 1,000; Referees: Tonton Banza Kalume (COD), Mahamadou Diallo (MLI), Michel Djeugoue (CMR)

=== BAL ===
Pos	Team	Pld	W	L	PF	PA	PD	PCT	Qualification
1	(Libya) Al Ahli Tripoli	6	6	0	604	498	+106	1.000	Advance to playoffs
2	(Rwanda) APR (H)	6	3	3	530	508	+22	.500	Advance to playoffs
3	(South Africa) MBB	6	2	4	476	539	−63	.333	
4	(Kenya) Nairobi City Thunder	6	1	5	474	539	−65	.167	

Source: BAL
Rules for classification: Tiebreakers
(H) Hosts

==== Nile Conference ====
17 May 2025	APR (Rwanda)	92–63	(Kenya) Nairobi City Thunder	Kigali, Rwanda
17:30	Scoring by quarter: 22–23, 17–8, 20–21, 33–11
	Pts: Diarra 23; Rebs: Diarra 12; Asts: Habimana 9	Boxscore	Pts: Ongwae 14; Rebs: Ongwae 9 Asts: Iroegbu 4	Arena: BK Arena; Attendance: 5,968; Referees: Cameron Garber, Wael Ibrahim Mostafa, Silver Houngbedji

18 May 2025	Nairobi City Thunder (Kenya)	87–115	(Libya) Al Ahli Tripoli	Kigali, Rwanda
14:30	Scoring by quarter: 18–24, 20–29, 15–28, 34–34
	Pts: Iroegbu 18; Rebs: Diong 8 Asts: Iroegbu 8	Boxscore	Pts: Boissy 30; Rebs: Thompson 14; Asts: Adams 7	Arena: BK Arena; Attendance: 3,225; Referees: Jean Sauveur Ruhamiriza, Amir Taboubi, Claudio Eiuba

20 May 2025	Nairobi City Thunder (Kenya)	74–75	(South Africa) MBB	Kigali, Rwanda
16:00	Scoring by quarter: 15–22, 18–10, 27–18, 14–25
	Pts: Ganapamo 21; Rebs: Adera 7 Asts: Adera 5	Boxscore	Pts: Prinsloo 30; Rebs: Prinsloo 11; Asts: Lenard, Mooring 5	Arena: BK Arena; Attendance: 3,279; Referees: Cameron Garber, Jean Sauveur Ruhamiriza, Mahamadou Diallo

22 May 2025	Al Ahli Tripoli (Libya)	104–91	(Kenya) Nairobi City Thunder	Kigali, Rwanda
16:00	Scoring by quarter: 32–24, 24–17, 27–18, 21–32
	Pts: Boissy 26; Rebs: Sadi 13; Asts: Agada 7	Boxscore	Pts: Iroegbu 23; Rebs: Adera 12; Asts: Diing 9	Arena: BK Arena; Attendance: 2,674; Referees: Maripier Malo, Wael Ibrahim Mostafa, Silver Houngbedji

24 May 2025	MBB (South Africa)	76–85	(Kenya) Nairobi City Thunder	Kigali, Rwanda
14:30	Scoring by quarter: 24–20, 15–21, 15–14, 22–30
	Pts: Lenard 39; Rebs: Lenard, Sibanyoni 9 Asts: Sibanyoni 2	Boxscore	Pts: Odero 23; Rebs: Adera 14; Asts: Iroegbu 7	Arena: BK Arena; Attendance: 3,251; Referees: Gina Catanzariti, Amir Taboubi, Hassane Kamate

25 May 2025	Nairobi City Thunder (Kenya)	74–77	(Rwanda) APR	Kigali, Rwanda
17:30	Scoring by quarter: 19–17, 26–18, 16–20, 13–22
	Pts: Odero 29; Rebs: Davis 10; Asts: Iroegbu 5	Boxscore	Pts: Diarra 22; Rebs: Diarra 17; Asts: Randle 5	Arena: BK Arena; Attendance: 6,606; Referees: Kenneth Gardner, Asmae Benkhadra, Mahamadou Diallo
