= 2026 BAL final =

Basketball Africa League championship game

- Promotional material for the final
- Event: 2026 BAL season
RSSB Tigers	Petro de Luanda
(Rwanda)	(Angola)
(7–2)	(6–3)
90	88
Head coach: Henry Mwinuka	Head coach: Sergio Valdeolmillos
	1	2	3	4	Total
RSSB Tigers	27	10	22	29	88
Petro de Luanda	16	26	19	29	90
- Date: 31 May 2026
- Venue: BK Arena, Kigali, Rwanda
- MVP: Craig Randall II
- Attendance: 6,629

The 2026 BAL final was the championship game of the 2026 BAL season, the sixth season of the Basketball Africa League (BAL), and the conclusion of the playoffs. The final was played on 31 May 2026 at the BK Arena in Kigali, Rwanda. The final was contested by Rwandan club RSSB Tigers and Angolan club Petro de Luanda.

RSSB Tigers won the final, defeating Petro de Luanda, 90–88, becoming the first Rwandan team to win the BAL championship. The victory came in the Tigers' first BAL season. Craig Randall II was named the Basketball Africa League Most Valuable Player after averaging 36.1 points per game during the season. As winners, RSSB Tigers qualified for the 2026 FIBA Intercontinental Cup.

== Background ==
RSSB Tigers entered the 2026 BAL season as a debutant after replacing fellow Rwandan club APR BBC. APR had withdrawn from the competition in March 2026 after concerns relating to its links to the Rwandan Defence Force and United States sanctions. The Rwanda Basketball Federation subsequently selected RSSB Tigers as its replacement on 20 March.

The Tigers had won the 2025 Rwanda Cup and 2026 National Super Cup before accepting the invitation to replace APR. They had only a few weeks to assemble their BAL roster. The team retained head coach Henry Mwinuka and several of its existing players, while adding players who had been associated with APR and other Rwandan clubs. Craig Randall II, Mangok Mathiang, Teafale Lenard Jr., Ntore Habimana, Antino Jackson and Axel Mpoyo became central members of the team.

Randall became the team's leading scorer and set BAL records with 54 points and 11 three-pointers in a 104–92 victory over Dar City on 4 April 2026.

Petro de Luanda entered the season as the defending BAL champions and qualified for a record sixth consecutive BAL season. The team retained much of its Angolan core but made significant roster changes before the playoffs. Among the notable additions were Chasson Randle and Raphiael Putney, while Javion Blake and Chinemelu Elonu left the roster before the playoffs.

=== Previous finals ===
In the following table, finals played in the FIBA Africa Clubs Champions Cup (ACC), the previous highest level continental competition, are in small text.

Team	Previous final appearances (bold indicates winners)
(Rwanda) RSSB Tigers	None
(Angola) Petro de Luanda	BAL: 3 (2022, **2024**, 2025)

== Road to the final ==
(Rwanda) RSSB Tigers		Round	(Angola) Petro de Luanda	
Opponent	Result	Conference phase	Opponent	Result
Kalahari Conference		Standings	Kalahari Conference	
(Libya) Al Ahly Ly	W 103–95	Matchday 1	(Libya) Al Ahly Ly	W 104–90
(Angola) Petro de Luanda	W 82–78	Matchday 2	(Kenya) Nairobi City Thunder	W 97–70
(South Africa) Johannesburg Giants	W 102–89	Matchday 3	(Rwanda) RSSB Tigers	L 78–82
(Tanzania) Dar City	W 104–92	Matchday 4	(Tanzania) Dar City	W 100–75
(Kenya) Nairobi City Thunder	L 92–101	Matchday 5	(South Africa) Johannesburg Giants	W 105–61
Opponent	Agg.	Playoffs	Opponent	Agg.
(Morocco) FUS Rabat	W 193–171	Quarterfinals	(Tanzania) Dar City	W 165–157
(Egypt) Al Ahly	W 106–97	Semifinals	(Libya) Al Ahly Ly	W 94–88

The RSSB Tigers were inserted into the BAL after APR withdrew from the competition. On 20 March, the Rwanda Basketball Federation announced that the Tigers would replace APR. The Tigers had won the 2025 Rwanda Cup and 2026 National Super Cup, which were cited by the federation as evidence of their readiness to compete at continental level.

RSSB opened the Kalahari Conference with a 103–95 victory over Al Ahly Ly and subsequently defeated Petro de Luanda 82–78. The Tigers finished first in the conference with a 4–1 record, ahead of Petro de Luanda on head-to-head record.

In the quarterfinals, the Tigers defeated FUS Rabat 95–72 in the first game before losing 99–98 in the second. They advanced 193–171 on aggregate. In the semifinals, they defeated Al Ahly 106–97 to become the first Rwandan team to reach the BAL final. Petro de Luanda finished second in the Kalahari Conference with a 4–1 record. The Angolan champions defeated Dar City 100–75 in the group phase, but were upset by Dar City 88–82 in the first game of their quarterfinal series. Petro recovered to win the second game 83–69 and advance 165–157 on aggregate. Petro then defeated Al Ahly Ly 94–88 in the semifinals to reach the BAL final for the third consecutive season and fourth time overall.

=== RSSB Tigers ===
RSSB Tigers entered the BAL after replacing APR and had only a few weeks to assemble their continental roster. The Tigers retained head coach Henry Mwinuka and several players from their existing squad, while adding experienced players from APR and other Rwandan clubs. Among the major additions were Craig Randall II, Mangok Mathiang, Teafale Lenard Jr., Ntore Habimana, Antino Jackson and Axel Mpoyo. James Maye, who had coached APR, joined the Tigers' staff as an assistant coach.

The Tigers made further changes before the playoffs. Center Oumar Ballo and Rwandan center Osborn Shema were added, while Viny Okouo left the roster. Ballo subsequently became an important part of the playoff rotation. Randall led the Tigers throughout the season, averaging 36.1 points per game. He set the BAL single-game scoring record with 54 points against Dar City and also set the league record for three-pointers in a game with 11. After finishing first in the Kalahari Conference, RSSB defeated FUS Rabat in the quarterfinals and Al Ahly in the semifinals. The semifinal victory made RSSB the first Rwandan team to reach the BAL final.

=== Petro de Luanda ===
Petro de Luanda entered the 2026 BAL season as the defending champions and became the first club to participate in six BAL seasons. They finished second in the Kalahari Conference with a 4–1 record.

The club's playoff roster differed substantially from its conference roster. Chasson Randle and Raphiael Putney were added, while Javion Blake and Chinemelu Elonu were removed from the roster. Randle had played for APR during the 2025 BAL season, while Putney had played for Rivers Hoopers in the previous season.

Petro defeated Dar City in the quarterfinals after losing the first game of the series and then defeated Al Ahly Ly in the semifinals. The victory sent Petro to its third consecutive BAL final and fourth overall.

== Game ==
=== Summary ===
Petro de Luanda started the game strongly, taking a 27–16 lead after the first quarter behind an efficient offensive performance. RSSB Tigers responded in the second quarter, outscoring Petro 26–10 to take a 42–37 lead into halftime. Petro recovered in the third quarter, cutting the deficit to 61–59 entering the fourth.

The fourth quarter remained closely contested, with neither team able to establish a decisive lead. Petro briefly regained the advantage, but RSSB Tigers responded to remain within reach. The Tigers ultimately prevailed 90–88 to win their first BAL championship, becoming the first Rwandan club to win the competition. The victory was RSSB's second win over Petro during the season, following their 82–78 victory in the Kalahari Conference.

Craig Randall II led RSSB Tigers with 33 points, while Mangok Mathiang recorded a double-double with 11 points and 14 rebounds. For Petro de Luanda, Aboubakar Gakou scored 28 points and collected 12 rebounds. The result ended Petro's attempt to win a second BAL championship and gave RSSB Tigers the title in their first appearance in the competition.

31 May 2026	RSSB Tigers (Rwanda)	90–88	(Angola) Petro de Luanda	Kigali, Rwanda
18:00	Scoring by quarter: 16–27, 26–10, 19–22, 29–29
	Pts: Randall 33; Rebs: Mathiang 14; Asts: Habimana 5	Boxscore	Pts: Gakou 28; Rebs: Dundao 7 Asts: Dundao 8	Arena: BK Arena; Attendance: 6,629

=== Details ===
Starters:			Pts	Reb	Ast
PG	12	(United States) Craig Randall II	33	2	1
G	15	(Rwanda) Ntore Habimana	6	6	5
PG	3	(United States) Antino Jackson Jr.	6	1	2
SF	24	(United States) Taefale Lenard	15	4	4
C	45	(South Sudan) Mangok Mathiang	11	14	3
Reserves:					
SF	34	(Rwanda) Dieudonne Ndizeyé	5	2	0
F/C	7	(Rwanda) Axel Mpoyo	3	3	1
C	11	(Mali) Oumar Ballo	11	4	0
SF	22	(Rwanda) Twizeyimana Nshuti	DNP		
SG	23	(Rwanda) Steven Hagumintwari	DNP		
G	5	(Senegal) Bathie Ndiaye	DNP		
SF	10	(Rwanda) Paul Bizimana	DNP		
C	42	(Ivory Coast) Marcel Okouo	DNP		
PF	50	(Rwanda) Cadeaux Furaha	DNP		
Head coach:
(Basketball Association of Tanzania) Henry Mwinuka

RSSB Tigers	Petro de Luanda

RSSB Tigers	Statistics	Petro de Luanda
16/30 (53%)	2-pt field goals	20/45 (44%)
11/34 (32%)	3-pt field goals	12/32 (38%)
25/35 (71%)	Free throws	12/22 (55%)
13	Offensive rebounds	20
28	Defensive rebounds	28
41	Total rebounds	48
16	Assists	22
17	Turnovers	17
9	Steals	8
4	Blocks	2
17	Fouls	25

2026 BAL champions

RSSB Tigers
1st BAL title; 1st continental title

Starters:			Pts	Reb	Ast
PG	13	(United States) Chasson Randle	17	5	3
C/PF	14	(Angola) Clésio Castro	7	3	0
PF	15	(Angola) Aboubakar Gakou	28	12	1
PG	4	(Angola) Gerson Domingos	0	0	2
G	10	(Angola) Lukeny Gonçalves	14	8	5
Reserves:					
C	2	(Angola) Yanick Moreira	5	3	0
SF	24	(Angola) Glofate Buiamba	0	1	0
PG	5	(Angola) Childe Dundão	9	7	8
G/F	7	(South Sudan) Kacuol Jok	0	0	0
SF	11	(United States) Raphiael Putney	6	4	3
G/F	12	(Angola) Milton Valente	2	1	0
SG	1	(Angola) Eduardo Simão	DNP		
PF	23	(Senegal) Mohamed Niane	DNP		
Head coach:
(Spanish Basketball Federation) Sergio Valdeolmillos

== Aftermath ==
=== Awards ===
Following the final, Craig Randall II was named the Basketball Africa League Most Valuable Player for the 2026 season. Randall led the league in scoring with an average of 36 points per game and played all 40 minutes in the championship game, scoring 33 points in the Tigers' victory.

Mangok Mathiang was named the 2026 Defensive Player of the Year and was selected alongside Randall on the All-BAL First Team. Henry Mwinuka was named Coach of the Year after leading RSSB Tigers to the final in their first BAL season. Petro de Luanda's Childe Dundao was also selected to the All-BAL First Team and the All-BAL Defensive First Team.

The All-BAL First Team consisted of Randall, Dundao, Donovan Williams, Majok Deng and Mathiang. The All-BAL Second Team consisted of Omar Abada, Zack Lofton, Kevin Murphy, Aboubakar Gakou and Jo Lual-Acuil.

Mohamed Sadi of Al Ahly Ly received the Manute Bol Sportsmanship Player of the Year Award.

=== Celebrations ===
The Tigers championship generated widespread celebrations in Kigali. President Paul Kagame and First Lady Jeannette Kagame attended the final at BK Arena. A championship parade was held in Kigali on 13 June 2026, nearly two weeks after the final. The trophy procession began at Club Rafiki and passed through Nyamirambo, Downtown, Remera-Gisimenti and Gishushu before reaching the Kigali Convention Centre (KCC) Roundabout. Thousands of supporters lined the route to celebrate the club's first continental championship. The parade concluded with an open-air concert at the KCC Roundabout featuring several Rwandan musicians. The Tigers players appeared on stage with the BAL trophy, while supporters sang and waved Rwandan flags. A fireworks display was held at the Kigali Convention Centre at 23:00 local time as part of the celebrations.

The victory also increased attention on RSSB's investment in basketball. RSSB chief executive officer Régis Rugemanshuro said after the championship that the organisation intended to build on the success and compete at the highest level in future BAL seasons. As BAL champions, RSSB Tigers qualified to represent Rwanda and Africa at the 2026 FIBA Intercontinental Cup. The tournament is scheduled to take place in Beijing, China, in September 2026, marking the Tigers' debut in the competition.

The championship roster was not retained in its entirety for the remainder of the domestic season. In July, Randall returned to APR BBC for the Rwanda Basketball League playoffs. Randall had originally signed with APR before the 2026 BAL season, but represented RSSB Tigers after APR withdrew from the competition and RSSB was selected as its replacement. Teafale Lenard Jr., another member of the championship-winning roster, also returned to APR during July. The movement reflected the unusual circumstances under which RSSB had assembled its BAL roster following APR's withdrawal from the competition.
