= 2023–24 KBF Premier League =

- League: KBF Premier League
- Sport: Basketball
- Number of teams: 12

Regular season
- Top seed: Nairobi City Thunder
- Season MVP: Albert Odero (Thunder)

Playoffs
- Playoffs MVP: Griffin Ligare (Thunder)
- Finals champions: Nairobi City Thunder (1st title)
- Runners-up: KPA

Seasons
- ← 2022–23 2024–25 →

The 2023–24 KBF Premier League, also known as the Kenyan Basketball National League, is the 34th season of the KBF Premier League, the top level Kenyan basketball league. The season began on 25 August 2023 with the regular season, the playoffs began on 31 May 2024 and ended on 20 July 2024.

KPA were the defending champions, but were defeated in the finals by top seed Nairobi City Thunder, who won their first title in team history. The Thunder were undefeated in the season, with an overall 30–0 record; they qualified for the 2025 Road to BAL as Kenyan champions.

== Regular season ==
Pos	Team	Pld	W	L	Pts	Qualification or relegation
1	Nairobi City Thunder	22	22	0	44	Advance to playoffs
2	KPA	22	17	5	34	Advance to playoffs
3	USIU Tigers	22	15	7	30	Advance to playoffs
4	Equity Dumas	22	15	7	30	Advance to playoffs
5	Ulinzi Warriors	22	15	7	30	Advance to playoffs
6	Strathmore Blades	22	11	11	22	Advance to playoffs
7	ANU Wolfpacks	22	9	13	18	Advance to playoffs
8	Terror	22	8	14	16	Advance to playoffs
9	Eldonets Platinum	22	7	15	14	
10	Umoja	22	6	16	12	
11	Absa (R)	22	4	18	8	Relegated to KBF Division 1
12	KU Pirates (R)	22	3	19	6	Relegated to KBF Division 1

Source: KBF on Facebook
(R) Relegated

== Playoffs ==
The quarterfinals were best-of-three series, while the semifinals finals were played in a best-of-five format.

Quarterfinals
1	Nairobi City Thunder	2
8	Terror	0
4	Equity Dumas	2
5	Ulinzi Warriors	0
2	KPA	2
7	ANU Wolfpacks	0
3	USIU Tigers	0
6	Strathmore Blades	2

Semifinals
1	Nairobi City Thunder	3
4	Equity Dumas	0
2	KPA	3
6	Strathmore Blades	0

Finals
1	Nairobi City Thunder	3
2	KPA	0

== Individual awards ==
- MVP: Albert Odero, Nairobi City Thunder
- Playoffs MVP: Griffin Ligare, Nairobi City Thunder
- Coach of the Year: Brad Ibs, Nairobi City Thunder
