= 2026 BAL playoffs =

Playoffs of the 2026 BAL season

2026 BAL Playoffs
Tournament details
- Country: Rwanda
- City: Kigali
- Venue: BK Arena
- Dates: 22–31 May 2026
- Teams: 8

Final positions
- Champions: (Rwanda) RSSB Tigers (1st title)
- Runners-up: (Angola) Petro de Luanda
- Third place: (Libya) Al Ahly Ly
- Fourth place: (Egypt) Al Ahly

Tournament statistics
- Matches played: 12

The 2026 BAL playoffs was the postseason tournament of the 2026 BAL season which determined the champions of the sixth Basketball Africa League (BAL) season. The playoffs began on 22 May 2026 with the quarterfinals and finished on 31 May 2026 with the final. All twelve games were played in the BK Arena in Kigali, Rwanda.

The quarterfinals were played as two-legged ties decided on aggregate score, while the semifinals, third place game and final were single games. The RSSB Tigers won the title in their debut season, beating Petro de Luanda 90–88 in the final, and became the first Rwandan team to win the BAL.

== Qualified teams ==
The top four teams from each of the two conferences of the group phase qualified for the playoffs. ASC Ville de Dakar, Club Africain, Dar City and the RSSB Tigers made their playoff debuts.

Team	Conference	Record	Seed	Playoff appearance
(Angola) Petro de Luanda	Kalahari	4–1	1	6th
(Egypt) Al Ahly	Sahara	4–1	2	3rd
(Rwanda) RSSB Tigers	Kalahari	4–1	3	1st
(Tunisia) Club Africain	Sahara	4–1	4	1st
(Libya) Al Ahly Ly	Kalahari	3–2	5	2nd
(Morocco) FUS Rabat	Sahara	3–2	6	3rd
(Senegal) ASC Ville de Dakar	Sahara	3–2	7	1st
(Tanzania) Dar City	Kalahari	2–3	8	1st

== Seeding ==
To determine the quarterfinal pairings, the eight qualified teams were seeded from 1 to 8 based on their performance across group phase games.

Pos	Team	Pld	W	L	GF	GA	GD	PCT
1	(Angola) Petro de Luanda	5	4	1	484	378	+106	.800
2	(Egypt) Al Ahly	5	4	1	395	357	+38	.800
3	(Rwanda) RSSB Tigers	5	4	1	483	455	+28	.800
4	(Tunisia) Club Africain	5	4	1	387	369	+18	.800
5	(Libya) Al Ahly Ly	5	3	2	520	456	+64	.600
6	(Morocco) FUS Rabat	5	3	2	390	339	+51	.600
7	(Senegal) ASC Ville de Dakar	5	3	2	380	364	+16	.600
8	(Tanzania) Dar City	5	2	3	454	477	−23	.400

Source: BAL
Rules for classification: Teams were seeded on their group phase records; the seeding determined the quarterfinal pairings, in which the first seed met the eighth, the second met the seventh, the third met the sixth and the fourth met the fifth.

== Bracket ==
Quarterfinals
1	(Angola) Petro de Luanda	82	83	165
8	(Tanzania) Dar City	88	69	157
4	(Tunisia) Club Africain	87	80	167
5	(Libya) Al Ahly Ly	88	98	186
2	(Egypt) Al Ahly	90	87	177
7	(Senegal) ASC Ville de Dakar	93	76	169
3	(Rwanda) RSSB Tigers	95	98	193
6	(Morocco) FUS Rabat	72	99	171

Semifinals
1	(Angola) Petro de Luanda	94
5	(Libya) Al Ahly Ly	88
2	(Egypt) Al Ahly	97
3	(Rwanda) RSSB Tigers	106

Final
1	(Angola) Petro de Luanda	88
3	(Rwanda) RSSB Tigers	90
Third place game
5	(Libya) Al Ahly Ly	106
2	(Egypt) Al Ahly	98

== Quarterfinals ==
Note: All times are in Central Africa Time.

=== (1) Petro de Luanda vs. (8) Dar City ===
Petro de Luanda won 165–157 on aggregate.

Game 1

23 May 2026	Petro de Luanda (Angola)	82–88	(Tanzania) Dar City	Kigali, Rwanda
20:00	Scoring by quarter: 26–22, 20–20, 22–16, 14–30
	Pts: Randle 18; Rebs: Gakou 9 Asts: Dundão 8	Boxscore	Pts: Utomi 22; Rebs: Mahmoud 12; Asts: Michineau 8	Arena: BK Arena; Attendance: 3,201; Referees: Jafar Kinsey, Mbaye Seye, Asmae Benkhadra

Game 2

25 May 2026	Dar City (Tanzania)	69–83	(Angola) Petro de Luanda	Kigali, Rwanda
21:00	Scoring by quarter: 16–26, 19–20, 17–22, 17–15
	Pts: Zouzoua 21; Rebs: Mahmoud 10; Asts: Mahmoud, Zouzoua 4	Boxscore	Pts: Randle 20; Rebs: Gakou 9 Asts: Dundão 11	Arena: BK Arena; Attendance: 3,512; Referees: Ian McClenny, Kastine Evans, Aya Ahmed

=== (4) Club Africain vs. (5) Al Ahly Ly ===
Al Ahly Ly won 186–167 on aggregate.

Game 1

23 May 2026	Club Africain (Tunisia)	87–88	(Libya) Al Ahly Ly	Kigali, Rwanda
17:00	Scoring by quarter: 15–28, 31–21, 19–20, 22–19
	Pts: Abada, Marnaoui 23; Rebs: Hagins 6 Asts: Abada 6	Boxscore	Pts: Deng 23; Rebs: Marei 14; Asts: Moore 8	Arena: BK Arena; Attendance: 1,586; Referees: Kastine Evans, Amr Aboollo, Aya Ahmed

Game 2

25 May 2026	Al Ahly Ly (Libya)	98–80	(Tunisia) Club Africain	Kigali, Rwanda
18:00	Scoring by quarter: 30–20, 20–24, 23–13, 25–23
	Pts: Williams 25; Rebs: Deng 11; Asts: Moore 13	Boxscore	Pts: Marnaoui 16; Rebs: Mohammed 7 Asts: Abada 7	Arena: BK Arena; Attendance: 2,008; Referees: Gina Catanzariti, Arnold Moseya, Asmae Benkhadra

=== (2) Al Ahly vs. (7) ASC Ville de Dakar ===
Al Ahly won 177–169 on aggregate.

Game 1

22 May 2026	Al Ahly (Egypt)	90–93	(Senegal) ASC Ville de Dakar	Kigali, Rwanda
18:00	Scoring by quarter: 29–25, 16–22, 22–22, 23–24
	Pts: Omot 23; Rebs: Amin, Murphy, Oraby 5 Asts: Lofton 6	Boxscore	Pts: Toupane 21; Rebs: Toupane 9 Asts: Toupane 7	Arena: BK Arena; Attendance: 2,835; Referees: Gina Catanzariti, Arnold Moseya, Claudio Eiuba

Game 2

24 May 2026	ASC Ville de Dakar (Senegal)	76–87	(Egypt) Al Ahly	Kigali, Rwanda
17:00	Scoring by quarter: 18–15, 16–13, 25–32, 17–27
	Pts: Toupane 16; Rebs: Majok 11; Asts: Toupane 7	Boxscore	Pts: Omot 24; Rebs: Murphy 8 Asts: Lofton 5	Arena: BK Arena; Attendance: 2,802; Referees: Yann Vezo Davidson, Jean Sauveur Ruhamiriza, Imene Tahmi

=== (3) RSSB Tigers vs. (6) FUS Rabat ===
RSSB Tigers won 193–171 on aggregate.

Game 1

22 May 2026	RSSB Tigers (Rwanda)	95–72	(Morocco) FUS Rabat	Kigali, Rwanda
21:00	Scoring by quarter: 24–13, 21–23, 26–24, 24–12
	Pts: Randall II 38; Rebs: Mathiang 15; Asts: Jackson Jr 8	Boxscore	Pts: Iroegbu 14; Rebs: Kuany 9 Asts: El Haoua 8	Arena: BK Arena; Attendance: 6,264; Referees: Ian McClenny, Oumar Sy, Imene Tahmi

Game 2

24 May 2026	FUS Rabat (Morocco)	99–98	(Rwanda) RSSB Tigers	Kigali, Rwanda
20:00	Scoring by quarter: 32–14, 19–30, 20–26, 28–28
	Pts: Perry 29; Rebs: Kuany 10; Asts: Perry 10	Boxscore	Pts: Randall II 43; Rebs: Mathiang 9 Asts: Jackson Jr 11	Arena: BK Arena; Attendance: 5,974; Referees: Jafar Kinsey, Mbaye Seye, Claudio Eiuba

== Semifinals ==
=== (1) Petro de Luanda vs. (5) Al Ahly Ly ===
28 May 2026	Petro de Luanda (Angola)	94–88	(Libya) Al Ahly Ly	Kigali, Rwanda
21:00	Scoring by quarter: 23–24, 20–24, 22–22, 29–18
	Pts: Dundão 26; Rebs: Putney 6 Asts: Gonçalves 10	Boxscore	Pts: Williams 30; Rebs: Lual-Acuil 8 Asts: Deng 6	Arena: BK Arena; Attendance: 5,103; Referees: Ian McClenny, Jean Sauveur Ruhamiriza, Amr Aboollo

=== (2) Al Ahly vs. (3) RSSB Tigers ===
27 May 2026	Al Ahly (Egypt)	97–106	(Rwanda) RSSB Tigers	Kigali, Rwanda
21:00	Scoring by quarter: 24–24, 26–26, 26–30, 21–26
	Pts: Lofton 36; Rebs: Osifo 10; Asts: Lofton 6	Boxscore	Pts: Randall II 30; Rebs: Ballo 18; Asts: Jackson Jr 7	Arena: BK Arena; Attendance: 6,530; Referees: Kastine Evans, Yann Vezo Davidson, Oumar Sy

== Third place game: (5) Al Ahly Ly vs. (2) Al Ahly ==
31 May 2026	Al Ahly Ly (Libya)	106–98	(Egypt) Al Ahly	Kigali, Rwanda
17:00	Scoring by quarter: 25–23, 27–15, 25–35, 29–25
	Pts: Deng 28; Rebs: Sadi 11; Asts: Moore 12	Boxscore	Pts: I. Zahran 23; Rebs: Khalaf, Osifo 5 Asts: Murphy 6	Arena: BK Arena; Attendance: 3,688; Referees: Jafar Kinsey, Jean Sauveur Ruhamiriza, Arnold Moseya

== Final: (1) Petro de Luanda vs. (3) RSSB Tigers ==
31 May 2026	Petro de Luanda (Angola)	88–90	(Rwanda) RSSB Tigers	Kigali, Rwanda
20:00	Scoring by quarter: 27–16, 10–26, 22–19, 29–29
	Pts: Gakou 28; Rebs: Gakou 12; Asts: Dundão 9	Boxscore	Pts: Randall II 33; Rebs: Mathiang 15; Asts: Habimana, Lenard 5	Arena: BK Arena; Attendance: 6,629; Referees: Gina Catanzariti, Yann Vezo Davidson, Oumar Sy
