= Tylor Ongwae =

Kenyan basketball player (born 1991)

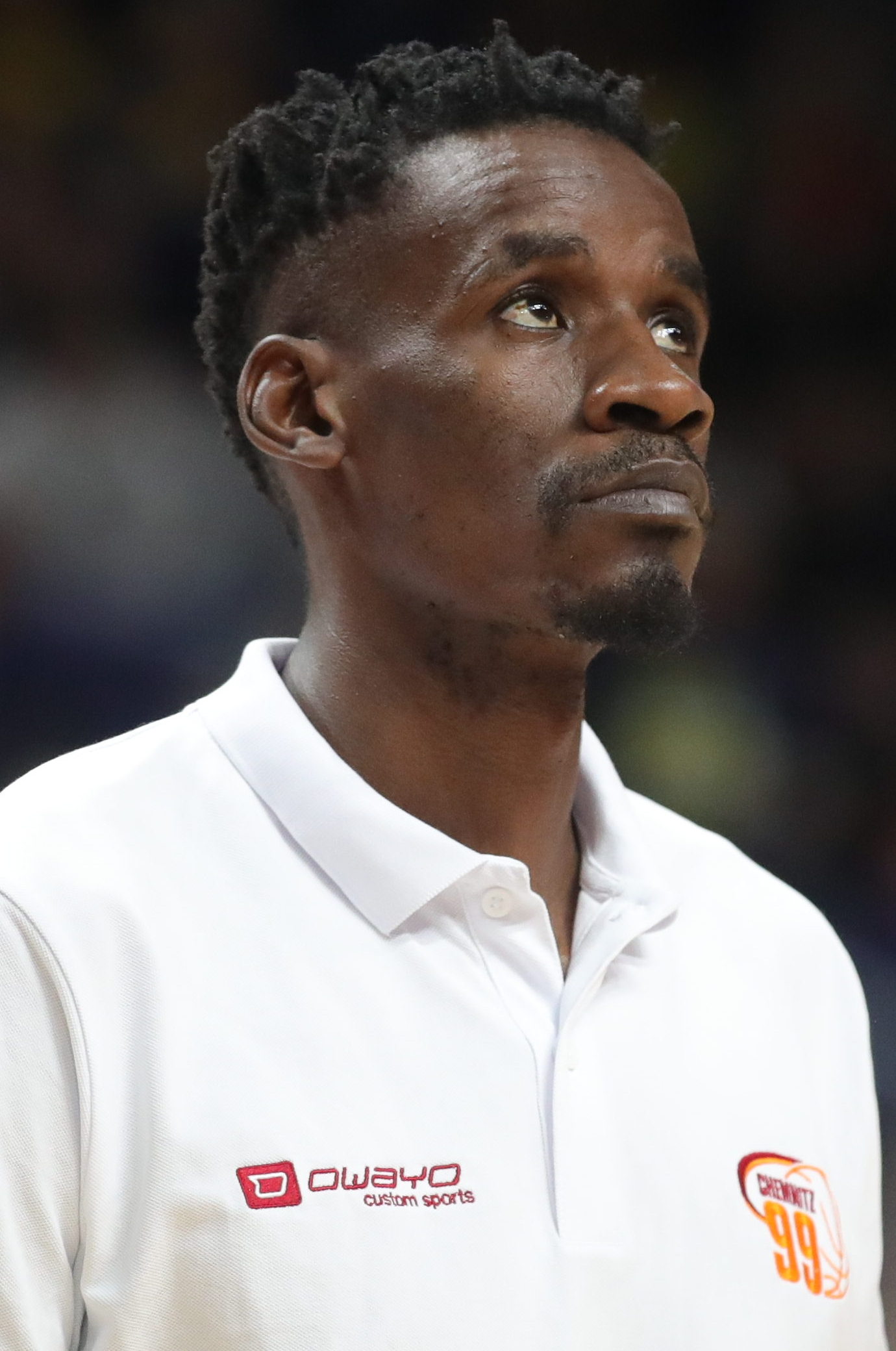
- Ongwae with Niners Chemnitz in 2023

No. 12 – Nairobi City Thunder
- Position: Small forward
- League: KBF Premier League; Basketball Africa League

Personal information
- Born: 15 July 1991 (age 35) Eldoret, Kenya
- Listed height: 6 ft 7 in (2.01 m)
- Listed weight: 205 lb (93 kg)

Career information
- College: Ranger JC (2011–2013); Louisiana–Monroe (2013–2015)
- NBA draft: 2015: undrafted
- Playing career: 2015–present

Career history
- 2015: Felice Scandone-Italian series A
- 2016–2017: Södertälje Kings-Sweden
- 2017: Taranaki Mountainairs-New Zealand
- 2017–2018: SAM Massagno-Swirtzerland
- 2018–2022: Bakken Bears-Danish league
- 2022–2023: BC Parma-VTB league
- 2023: Avelino -Italian series A
- 2023–2024: Niners Chemnitz-Germany BBL
- 2024–present: Nairobi City Thunder-Kenya

Career highlights
- FIBA Europe Cup champion (2024); 4× Basketligaen champion (2019–2021); 2× Basketligaen Defender of the Year (2021, 2022); 2× Danish Cup champion (2020, 2021); 1st team All sun belt conference (2014-2015) -University Of Louisiana at Monroe; 3rd team All sunbelt conference (2013-2014)
Medals
Men's basketball
Representing Kenya
FIBA AfroCan
Silver medal – second place	2019 Mali

Tylor Ongwae (born 15 July 1991) is a Kenyan basketball player for the Nairobi City Thunder of the KBF Premier League and the Basketball Africa League (BAL) and the Kenya national team. He has known his most successful years in Denmark with Bakken Bears, with whom he won three straight Basketligaen titles and was named Defensive Player of the Year twice.

== Professional career ==
Ongwae averaged 10 points and five rebounds per game during the 2019–20 season with Bakken. He re-signed with the Bears on March 22, 2020. In 2020-21 and 2021–22, he earned All-Danish Basketligaen Defensive Player of the Year honours.

In 2022, he left Bakken after four years to move to Russian side BC Parma.

In May 2023, Ongwae joined the ABC Fighters for the playoffs of the 2023 Basketball Africa League (BAL). He became the first Kenyan to play in the BAL. In October 2023, he was signed by the Niners Chemnitz of the German Bundesliga, with whom he won the FIBA Europe Cup.

In August 2024, Ongwae signed in Kenya with the Nairobi City Thunder of the KBF Premier League. He helped the Thunder qualify for their first ever Basketball Africa League (BAL) season by winning the Road to BAL qualifiers. On May 17, 2025, Ongwae scored a team-high 14 points in his BAL debut, in a 63–92 loss to APR.

== Kenyan national team ==
Ongwae has been part of Kenya's national team. He helped the team capture the silver medal at FIBA AfroCan 2019. Ongawe was a key part in Kenya's qualification for the AfroBasket 2021 in Rwanda, as he scored a buzzer-beater in the decisive qualifying game against Angola. Kenya returned to the AfroBasket after a 28-year drought.

== Personal ==
Tylor Ongwae was raised in Eldoret, Kenya, a town famed for producing world famous marathoners and athletes like Eliud Kipchoge. He has two siblings who also play basketball.

== BAL career statistics ==
Legend
GP	Games played	GS	Games started	MPG	Minutes per game
FG%	Field goal percentage	3P%	3-point field goal percentage	FT%	Free throw percentage
RPG	Rebounds per game	APG	Assists per game	SPG	Steals per game
BPG	Blocks per game	PPG	Points per game	**Bold**	Career high
*	Led the league

Year	Team	GP	GS	MPG	FG%	3P%	FT%	RPG	APG	SPG	BPG	PPG
2023	ABC Fighters	1	1	31.8	.333	.200	.000	5.0	4.0	1.0	.0	7.0
