= Ulinzi Warriors =

- Nickname: Soldiers
- Leagues: KBF Premier League
- Location: Moi Air Base, Eastleigh, Nairobi, Kenya
- Chairman: SN Saidi
- Team manager: Stephen Bartilol
- Head coach: Bernard Mufutu
- Ownership: Kenya Defense Forces
Home

The Ulinzi Warriors are Kenyan a basketball club based in Moi Air Base in Eastleigh, a suburb of Nairobi. The club is affiliated with the Kenya Defence Forces and is often nicknamed Soldiers. The Warriors are eight-time national champions of Kenya, trailing only KPA for holding the record of most championships.

The Warriors are a regular member of the KBF Premier League, however, the team was folded in 2007 but returned in 2012.

== Honours ==
KBF Premier League

- Winners (8): 1999, 2002, 2003, 2004, 2005, 2006, 2015, 2019
  - Runners-up (2): 2014, 2018

== Players ==
=== Current roster ===
The following is the Ulinzi Warriors roster for the 2022 BAL Qualifying Tournaments.

Note: Flags indicate national team eligibility at FIBA-sanctioned events. Players may hold other non-FIBA nationalities not displayed.

Ulinzi Warriors roster
Players
Coaches

Pos.	No.	Nat.	Name
PG	4	(Kenya)	Khaemba, Situmba
	5	(Kenya)	Menya, Tiberous
G	6	(Kenya)	Bosire, Victor
	7	(Kenya)	Mwangi, James
	8	(Kenya)	Ouma, David
	9	(Kenya)	Wafula, Ancetas
	10	(Kenya)	Okumu, Joshua
SG	11	(Kenya)	Mutoro, Erick
SF	12	(Kenya)	Nyakinda, Valentine
	13	(Kenya)	Phillip, Antonio
	14	(Kenya)	Washika, John
	15	(Kenya)	Otieno, William
	16	(Kenya)	Wasilwa, Byron

Head coach

- (Kenya) William Balozi

Team manager

- (Kenya) Stephen Bartilol

Legend

- (C) Team captain
- Injured

- Roster
Updated: October 31, 2021
