= FIBA Africa Zone 5 Club Championship (women) =

- Organising body: FIBA Africa
- Founded: 1995
- First season: 1995
- Country: Zone 5 member countries
- Current champions: (Kenya) KPA (8 titles) (2023)
- Most championships: (Kenya) KPA (8 titles)

The FIBA Africa Zone 5 Club Championship, formerly the East and Central African Club Championship, is a women's basketball club competition for teams in FIBA Africa's Zone 5, which exists of teams in East Africa. The competition was founded in 1995. The winners of the zone championship qualified for the FIBA Africa Women's Club Champions Cup. The tournament is held annually in October, with teams qualifying through their domestic leagues.

== Results ==
| Ed. | Year | Finals host | Final | | | Third place game | | | Num. teams | Ref. |
| Ed. | Year | Finals host | Winners | Score | Runners-up | Third place | Score | Fourth place | Num. teams | Ref. |
|---|---|---|---|---|---|---|---|---|---|---|
| 1 | 1995 | (Zimbabwe); Harare | (Kenya); KCB Lions | | | | | | | |
| 2 | 1996 | (Kenya); Nairobi | (Kenya); KCB Lions | | | | | | | |
| 3 | 1997 | (Uganda); Kampala | (Kenya); KCB Lions | | | | | | | |
| 4 | 1998 | (Tanzania); Dar es Salaam | (Kenya); KCB Lions | | | | | | | |
| 5 | 1999 | (Zambia); Lusaka | (Kenya); Telkom | | | | | | | |
| 6 | 2000 | (Uganda); Kampala | (Kenya); Ogopa | | | | | | | |
| 7 | 2001 | (Rwanda); Kigali | (Kenya); KPA | | | | | | | |
| 8 | 2002 | (Kenya); Nairobi | (Kenya); KPA | | | | | | | |
| 9 | 2003 | Zanzibar | (Tanzania); JKT | | | | | | | |
| 10 | 2004 | (Uganda); Kampala | (Uganda); Lady Bucks | | | | | | | |
| 11 | 2005 | (Tanzania); Dar es Salaam | Storms | | | | | | | |
| 12 | 2006 | (Kenya); Nairobi | (Kenya); KPA | | | | | | | |
| 13 | 2007 | (Rwanda); Kigali | (Kenya); KPA | | | | | | 12 | |
| 14 | 2008 | (Ethiopia); Addis Ababa | (Kenya); KPA | | | | | | | |
| 15 | 2009 | (Uganda); Kampala | (Kenya); KPA | | | | | | | |
| 16 | 2010 | (Burundi); Bujumbura | (Kenya); Eagle Wings | | | | | | | |
| 17 | 2011 | (Tanzania); Dar es Salaam | (Kenya); KPA | | | | | | | |
| 18 | 2012 | (Uganda); Kampala | (Kenya); Eagle Wings | 77–54 | (Kenya); KPA | (Uganda); KCCA Leopards | 62–55 | (Uganda); UCU Lady Canons | | |
| 19 | 2013 | (Burundi); Bujumbura | (Kenya); Eagle Wings | 67–62 | (Kenya); USIU | | | | | |
| 20 | 2014 | (Kenya); Mombasa | (Kenya); USIU | | (Kenya); KPA | | | | 7 | |
| 21 | 2015 | (Rwanda); Kigali | (Burundi); Berco Stars | 63–52 | (Uganda); KCCA Leopards | (Kenya); USIU | 92–60 | (Rwanda); Ubumwe | 6 | |
| 25 | 2018 | (Tanzania); Dar es Salaam | (Kenya); Equity Bank Hawks | Round-robin | (Kenya); KPA | | | | | |
| 26 | 2019 | (Tanzania); Dar es Salaam | (Uganda); JKL Dolphins | 62–53 | (Kenya); Equity Bank Hawks | (Uganda); UCU Lady Canons | Round-robin | (Rwanda); APR | 6 | |
| 27 | 2023 | (Egypt); Cairo | (Kenya); KPA | | (Rwanda); REG | (Kenya); Equity Bank Hawks | 78–74 | (Uganda); JKL Dolphins | 10 | |
