= Will Davis (basketball) =

American basketball player (born 1992)

Free agent
- Position: Power forward / center

Personal information
- Born: November 9, 1992 (age 34) Yolo County, California, U.S.
- Listed height: 6 ft 8 in (2.03 m)
- Listed weight: 220 lb (100 kg)

Career information
- High school: Sacramento (Sacramento, California); New Hampton School (New Hampton, New Hampshire)
- College: UC Irvine (2011–2015)
- NBA draft: 2015: undrafted
- Playing career: 2015–present

Career history
- 2015–2016: Kolossos Rodou
- 2016–2018: Reno Bighorns
- 2018: Windy City Bulls
- 2018: AEK Larnaca
- 2018–2019: Al Wasl
- 2019: Long Island Nets
- 2019: Edmonton Stingers
- 2019–2020: Steaua București
- 2021: Regatas Corrientes
- 2021–2022: South Bay Lakers
- 2022: Raptors 905
- 2022: College Park Skyhawks
- 2023: Spartans Distrito Capital
- 2023: Cañeros del Este
- 2023–2024: NBA G League Ignite
- 2024: Spartans Distrito Capital
- 2024: Nairobi City Thunder
- 2024–2025: Kaohsiung Steelers

Career highlights
- First-team All-Big West (2015); Big West Defensive Player of the Year (2013)
Medals
Men's basketball
Representing United States
FIBA AmeriCup
Bronze medal – third place	2022 Brazil

William Sidney Davis II (born November 9, 1992) is an American professional basketball player who last played for the Kaohsiung Steelers of the P. League+. He played college basketball at UC Irvine.

== Early life and high school ==
Davis was born and grew up in Sacramento, California, and attended Sacramento High School. He was 5-foot-9 as a freshman but grew to 6–5 by the end of his sophomore year. Davis played on the junior varsity basketball until his junior year and did not see significant playing time until his senior season, when he averaged 9.1 points and 8.2 rebounds per game. After receiving interest from only one Division I basketball program, Davis opted to complete a fifth year at the New Hampton School in New Hampton, New Hampshire.

== College career ==
Davis played four seasons for the Anteaters and was the team's starting power forward for his final three. As a freshman, Davis set the school record for blocks in a season with 55. He was named the Big West Conference Defensive Player of the Year as a sophomore and broke his previous school record and led the conference with 88 blocked shots. As a senior, Davis was named first team All-Big West and led the team with 12.9 points and 7.1 rebounds per game. He was named the Most Valuable Player of the 2015 Big West Conference tournament as UC Irvine won its first conference championship and received its first-ever bid to the NCAA Division I men's basketball tournament. He finished his career with a school-record 208 blocks (4th most in Big West history), 852 career rebounds (2nd in school history) and 8th in scoring with 1,384 points.

== Professional career ==
=== Kolossos Rodou (2015–2016) ===
Davis signed with Kolossos Rodou B.C. of the Greek Basket League (GBL) on August 20, 2015. In his first professional season, Davis averaged 7.0 points and 4.0 rebounds and 18.2 minutes played in 28 games (six starts).

=== Reno Bighorns (2016–2018) ===
Davis was selected by the Reno Bighorns in the second round of the 2016 NBA Development League draft. He averaged 9.7 points, 4.3 rebounds, and 1.1 blocks over 42 games for the Bighorns during the 2016–17 G League season and finished 6th in the G-League in field goal percentage with .611 and 8th with an offensive rating of 124.9. In his second season with Reno, Davis averaged 8.6 points, 4.3 rebounds and 18.6 minutes per game in 32 games before being traded.

=== Windy City Bulls (2018) ===
The Bighorns traded Davis to the Windy City Bulls on February 22, 2018. He averaged 4.4 points and 2.2 rebounds in 14 games with the Bulls and 7.4 points and 3.7 rebounds in 46 total G-League games. Davis was selected in the 2018 NBA G League Expansion Draft by the Capital City Go-Go.

=== Larnaca (2018) ===
Following the G-League season, Davis signed with AEK Larnaca of the Cypriot Basketball League on August 6, 2018. Davis only appeared in two games with Larnaca before leaving the team, both in the qualifying round of the 2018–19 Basketball Champions League, scoring 28 points and grabbing 8 rebounds.

=== Al Wasl (2018–2019) ===
After leaving Larnaca, Davis signed with Al Wasl of the UAE National Basketball League.

=== Long Island Nets (2019) ===
Davis returned to the G-League after his overseas rights were acquired in a trade from the Go-Go by the Long Island Nets on February 20, 2019. Davis played in 10 regular season games with the Nets, averaging 4.6 points and 3.0 rebounds with 11.5 minutes played per game and appeared sparingly in two playoff games as Long Island eventually lost in the G-League Finals to the Rio Grande Valley Vipers.

=== Steaua București (2019–2020) ===
Davis signed with Steaua București of the Romanian Liga Națională on September 24, 2019.

=== South Bay Lakers (2021–2022) ===
On December 30, 2021, Davis was acquired by the South Bay Lakers of the NBA G League. Davis was then later waived on February 2, 2022.

=== Raptors 905 (2022) ===
On February 7, 2022, Davis was acquired via the available player pool by the Raptors 905. On February 12, 2022, Davis was waived by the Raptors 905.

=== College Park Skyhawks (2022) ===
On February 24, 2022, Davis was acquired via available player pool by the College Park Skyhawks.

=== NBA G League Ignite (2023–2024) ===
On November 9, 2023, Davis was acquired by the NBA G League Ignite.

=== Return to Spartans (2024) ===
On April 5, 2024, Davis re-signed with Spartans Distrito Capital.

=== Nairobi City Thunder (2024) ===
On September 19, 2024, Davis signed with Kenyan champions Nairobi City Thunder of the KBF Premier League, and will join the team in their Road to BAL campaign.

=== Kaohsiung Steelers (2024–2025) ===
On December 20, 2024, Davis signed with the Kaohsiung Steelers of the P. League+. On February 19, his contract was terminated.
