= Amadou Gallo Fall =

Senegalese-American basketball executive (born 1963)

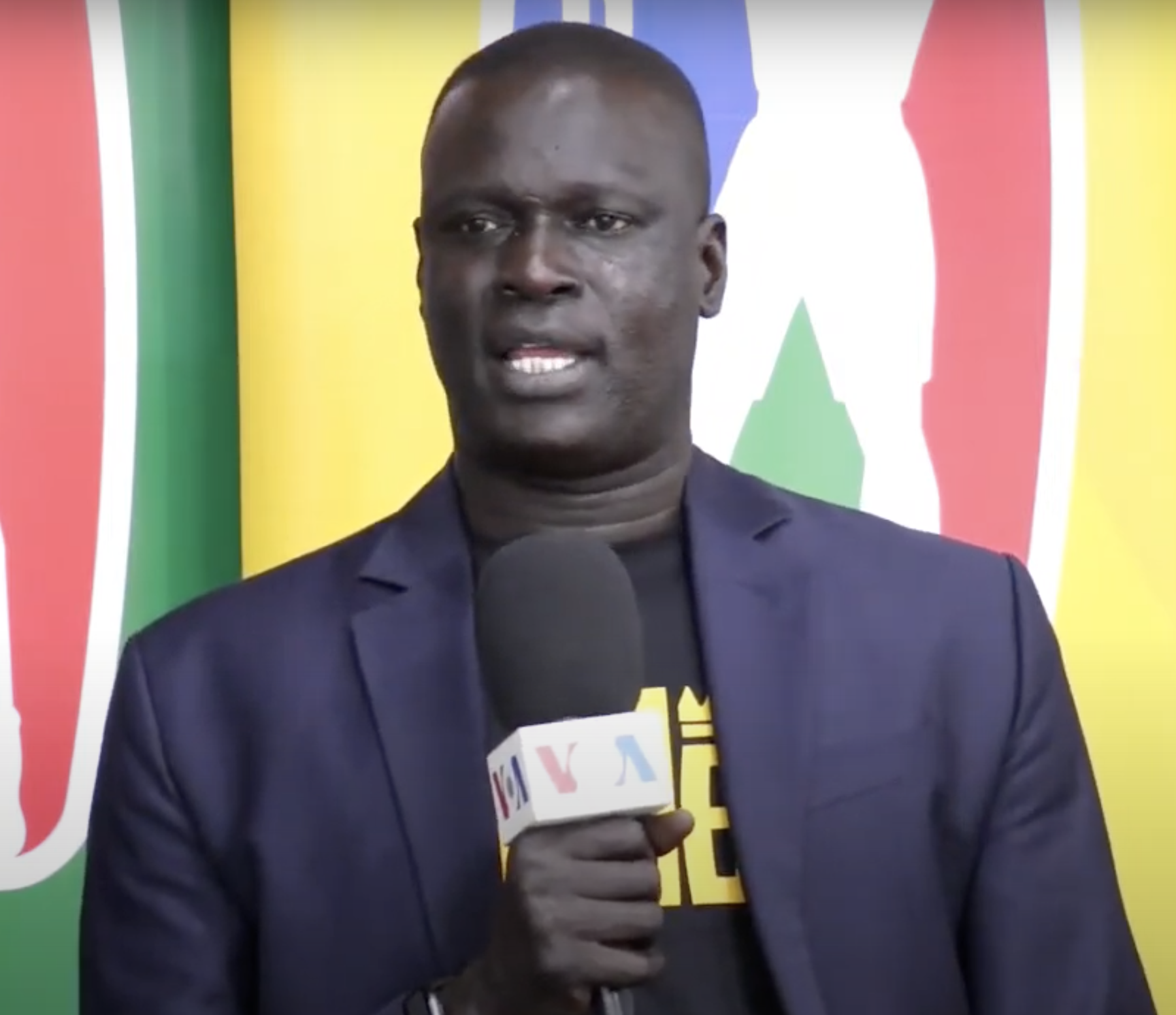
Amadou Gallo Fall

Amadou Gallo Fall (born December 11 1963) is a Senegalese-American basketball executive.

== Career ==
Born in Kaolack, he grew up in his native Senegal. According to Fall, he was introduced to basketball in his "late teenage years" and joined the Dakar University club. He studied in Senegal and in Tunisia, before receiving a scholarship for the University of the District of Columbia (UDC) in the United States in 1989. While attending a basketball camp in Senegal, Fall had caught the eye of a Peace Corps volunteer from the D.C. area, who put him in touch with UDC coach George Leftwich. Standing 6'8'' tall, Fall played center for the UDC men's basketball team from 1989 to 1993. He graduated from the University of the District of Columbia with Magna Cum Laude distinction.

In 1998, he founded the non-profit organization SEED (Sports for Education and Economic Development), which includes the SEED Academy, a basketball academy in the Thiès region in Senegal. He also worked with Senegal's Ministry of Youth and Sport and with the NBA's Basketball Without Borders programme. From 2001 to 2009, Fall worked for NBA's Dallas Mavericks, serving as scouting director (2001 to 2005) as well as director of player personnel and vice president of international affairs (2005 to 2009).

In 2010, Fall was chosen to head the NBA's office in Johannesburg, South Africa and as NBA's managing director for Africa was responsible for overseeing the league's development in Africa in the following years. He was also named NBA's vice president. Under his guidance, the NBA opened its NBA Academy Africa in May 2017.

In May 2019, Fall was appointed as president of the Basketball Africa League (BAL) which started operating in 2021.

=== Honours ===
- Naismith Legacy Award (2023)
- Member of the University of the District of Columbia Athletics Hall of Fame (inducted in 2020)
- New African's 100 Most Influential Africans (2019)
- African Leader 4 Change Award (2017)
- South African Sport Industry's Leadership in Sport Award (2018)
