= Uchenna Iroegbu =

American-Nigerian basketball player (born 1996)

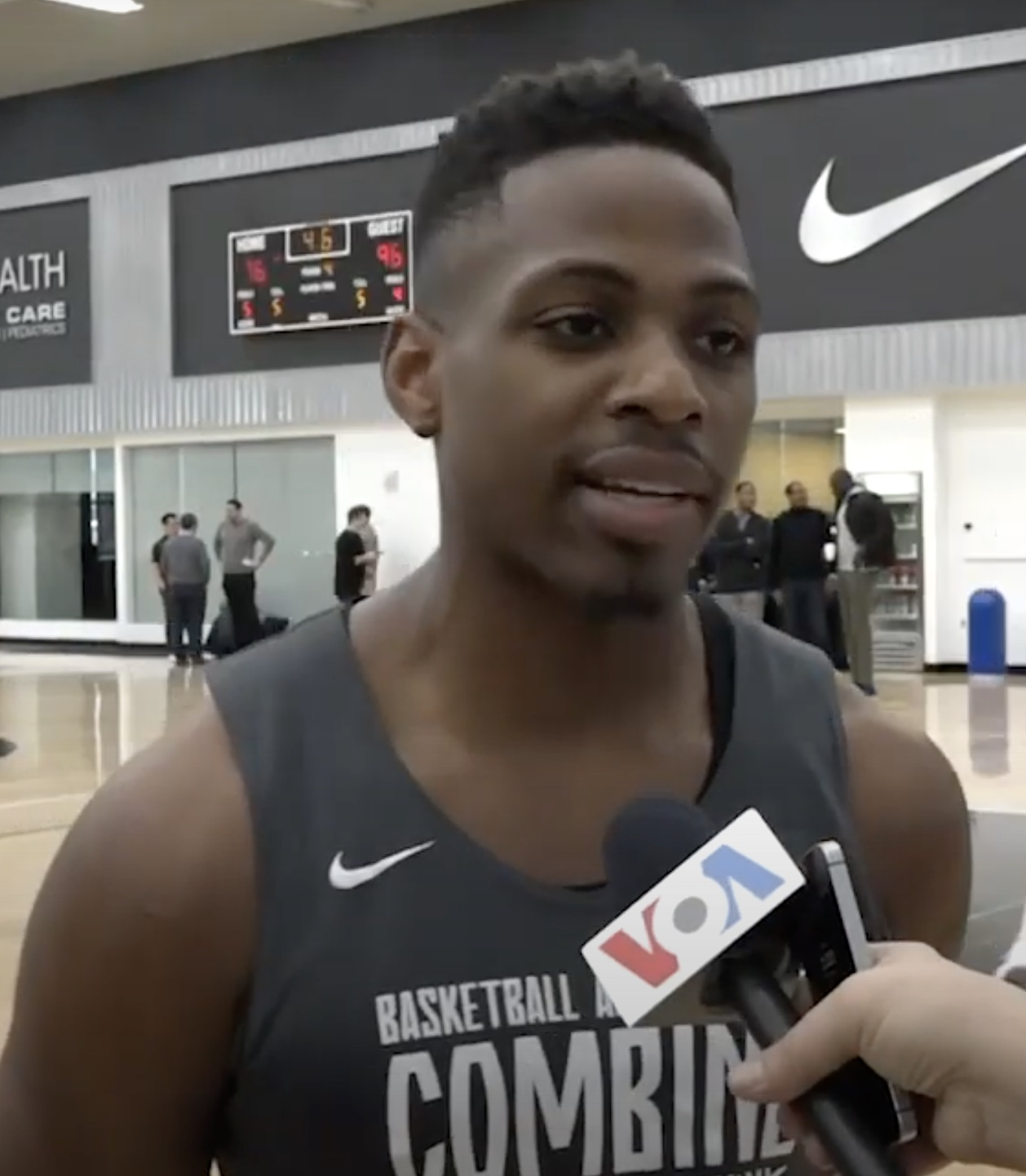
- Iroegbu at the BAL Combine in 2020

No. 1 – Science City Jena
- Position: Point guard
- League: Basketball Bundesliga

Personal information
- Born: 20 August 1996 (age 30) Sacramento, California, U.S.
- Listed height: 1.83 m (6 ft 0 in)
- Listed weight: 83 kg (183 lb)

Career information
- High school: Capital Christian (Sacramento, California)
- College: College of Southern Idaho (2014–2016); Stony Brook (2016–2018)
- NBA draft: 2018: undrafted
- Playing career: 2018–present

Career history
- 2018: Stockton Kings
- 2019: CP La Roda
- 2021–2022: College Park Skyhawks
- 2023: SLAC
- 2023–2024: Al-Shamal
- 2024–2025: Nairobi City Thunder
- 2026–present: Science City Jena

Uchenna "U.C." Iroegbu (born 20 August 1996) is an American-Nigerian professional basketball player who currently plays for Science City Jena of the German Basketball Bundesliga (BBL). He played college basketball for Stony Brook. Standing at 183 cm (6 ft 0 in), he is a point guard and has represented the Nigeria national basketball team.

== Early life and high school career ==
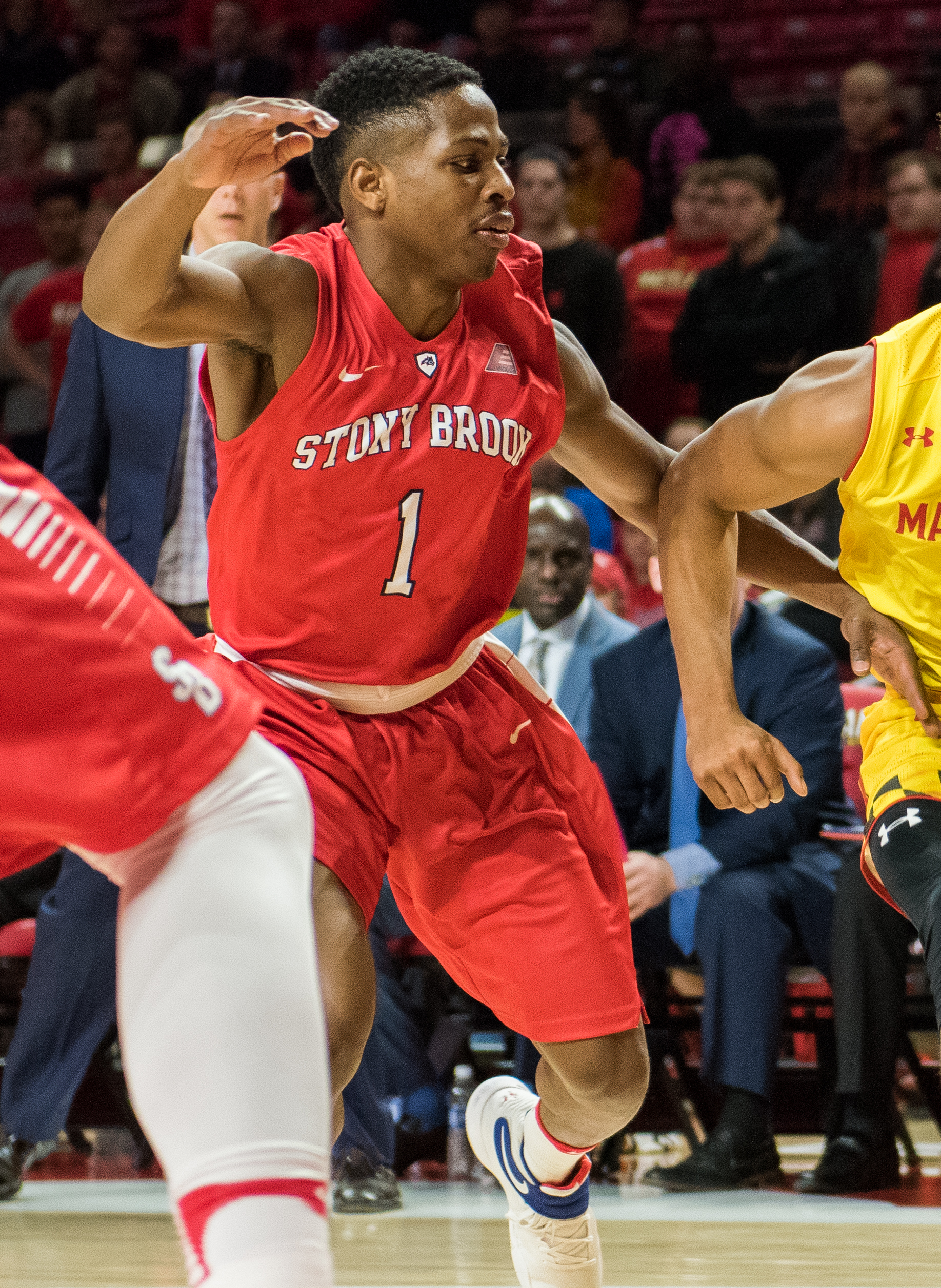
Iroegbu with Stony Brook in 2016

Iroegbu was born in Sacramento, California. He played all four seasons at Capital Christian High School. In his senior year, he averaged 15 points, 4 assists and 2 steals per game, being named to the all-district and all-league teams as his team finished third in the state of California with a 28–4 record and a CIF Sac-Joaquin Section Division V championship.

== College career ==
Iroegbu played his first two seasons for the College of Southern Idaho at the junior college level. He averaged 4.1 points per game as a freshman but got more playing time as a sophomore, as he averaged 6.6 points per game.

He transferred to Stony Brook before the 2016–17 season, joining a Seawolves team that had a 26–7 record the year prior to make their first NCAA Tournament. He started 10 of 32 games in his junior season and averaged 5.1 points. Iroegbu scored 18 points against Ball State as a senior, a new career high. On January 3, 2018, he hit a late three to give Stony Brook a 71–70 win over Maine after the Seawolves had blown a 20-point lead. Iroegbu recorded a new career-high 20 point game against UMBC on February 21, 2018. He finished his senior season averaging 8.1 points per game while starting 13 of 32 games.

== Professional career ==
Following a local tryout, Iroegbu started his career with the Stockton Kings in the NBA G League. On 9 January 2019, Iroegbu signed with CP La Roda in the Spanish LEB Plata to replace Jabs Newby. On 1 March 2020, Iroegbu signed with Rivers Hoopers in Nigeria for the 2020 BAL season. However, the season was cancelled due to the COVID-19 pandemic and Iroegbu did not join the team.

Iroegbu signed with the College Park Skyhawks of the NBA G League before the 2021–22 season.

In April 2023, Iroegbu joined Guinean club SLAC of the Basketball Africa League (BAL).

In December 2023, Iroegbu made his debut with Al-Shamal of the Qatari Basketball League (QBL). He averaged 27.1 points, 3.8 rebounds and 4.5 assists in the 2023–24 season. He also played with Al-Shamal in the West Asia Super League (WASL), and led the team in scoring with 24 points per game.

In September 2024, Iroegbu signed with the Nairobi City Thunder from the Kenyan KBF Premier League, joining the team for the Road to BAL tournament. In May 2025, he played with the Thunder in the 2025 BAL season, Iroegbu's second season in the top continental level.

On January 3, 2026, he signed with Science City Jena of the German Basketball Bundesliga (BBL).

== Personal life ==
Iroegbu's two brothers, Chuks and Ikenna, both played Division I college basketball as well. Chuks Iroegbu played for Northern Illinois and Ike Iroegbu was a starting point guard for Washington State.

== BAL career statistics ==
Legend
GP	Games played	GS	Games started	MPG	Minutes per game
FG%	Field goal percentage	3P%	3-point field goal percentage	FT%	Free throw percentage
RPG	Rebounds per game	APG	Assists per game	SPG	Steals per game
BPG	Blocks per game	PPG	Points per game	**Bold**	Career high

Year	Team	GP	GS	MPG	FG%	3P%	FT%	RPG	APG	SPG	BPG	PPG
2023	SLAC	5	5	36.8	.376	.286	.579	4.0	3.6	1.6	.0	17.0
