= Nairobi City Thunder =

- 2024–25 Nairobi City Thunder season
- League: KBF Premier League; BAL
- Founded: 1998
- History: NSSF Stars (1998–2003); International Christian Church (2003–2010); Nairobi City Thunder (2010–present)
- Arena: Nyayo Gymnasium
- Capacity: 2,500
- Location: Nairobi, Kenya
- Team colours: Dark Navy, Orange and White
- CEO: Colin Rasmussen
- General manager: Kush Diriye
- Head coach: Brad Ibs
- Ownership: Twende Sports Limited
- Championships: 3 (2000, 2024, 2025)
Home	Away

The Nairobi City Thunder are a Kenyan professional basketball team based in the Shauri Moyo neighborhood of Nairobi. Founded in 1998 as NSSF Stars, they play in the KBF Premier League, the top flight division of men's basketball in the country. The Thunder have played in the Basketball Africa League (BAL) since the 2025 season, and are the first Kenyan team to play in the league.

The Thunder have won four national titles: in 2000 as NSSF Stars and in 2024, 2025 and 2026 as Nairobi City Thunder. Their three consecutive titles from 2024 to 2026 were won unbeaten, with a domestic league record of 90–0. Home games are mostly played at the Nyayo Indoor Gymnasium, which has capacity for 2,500 people.

== History ==
The club was founded by Faustin Mgendi in 1998 as the NSSF Stars, a corporate team of the National Social Security Fund, a government agency responsible for retirement funds in the country. Founder Mgendi later coached the team as well. The Stars reached the finals of the KBF Premier League for the first time in 1999, and won the championship in 2000.

The team re-branded to the International Christian Center in 2003, as the church of the same name became the team's primary sponsor. The sponsorship agreement ran for seven years, and ended in 2010.

From 2010, the team became self-funded and was named the Nairobi City Thunder. Their second finals appearance was in 2019.

=== New ownership era ===
In 2023, the team was acquired by Twende Sports Limited, founded by Colin Rasmussen, Sandra Kimokoti, Kush Diriye and Stephen Domingo. Following the transaction, the club transitioned to a fully professional organization, becoming the first basketball team in Kenya to employ full-time professional players. The acquisition gave the team significant financial support with the goal of establishing an elite basketball club and youth program. The Thunder hired Brad Ibs as their head coach for the 2023–24 season, who took over from long-serving coach Sadat Gaya, and acquired several Premier League star players. In September 2026, actress Lupita Nyong’o announced that she had become an investor in Nairobi City Thunder.

The Thunder won their first national championship on 20 July 2024, when they defeated KPA in the finals of the 2023–24 season. Thunder players Griffin Ligare and Albert Odero were named the league's Playoffs MVP, and Season MVP, respectively.

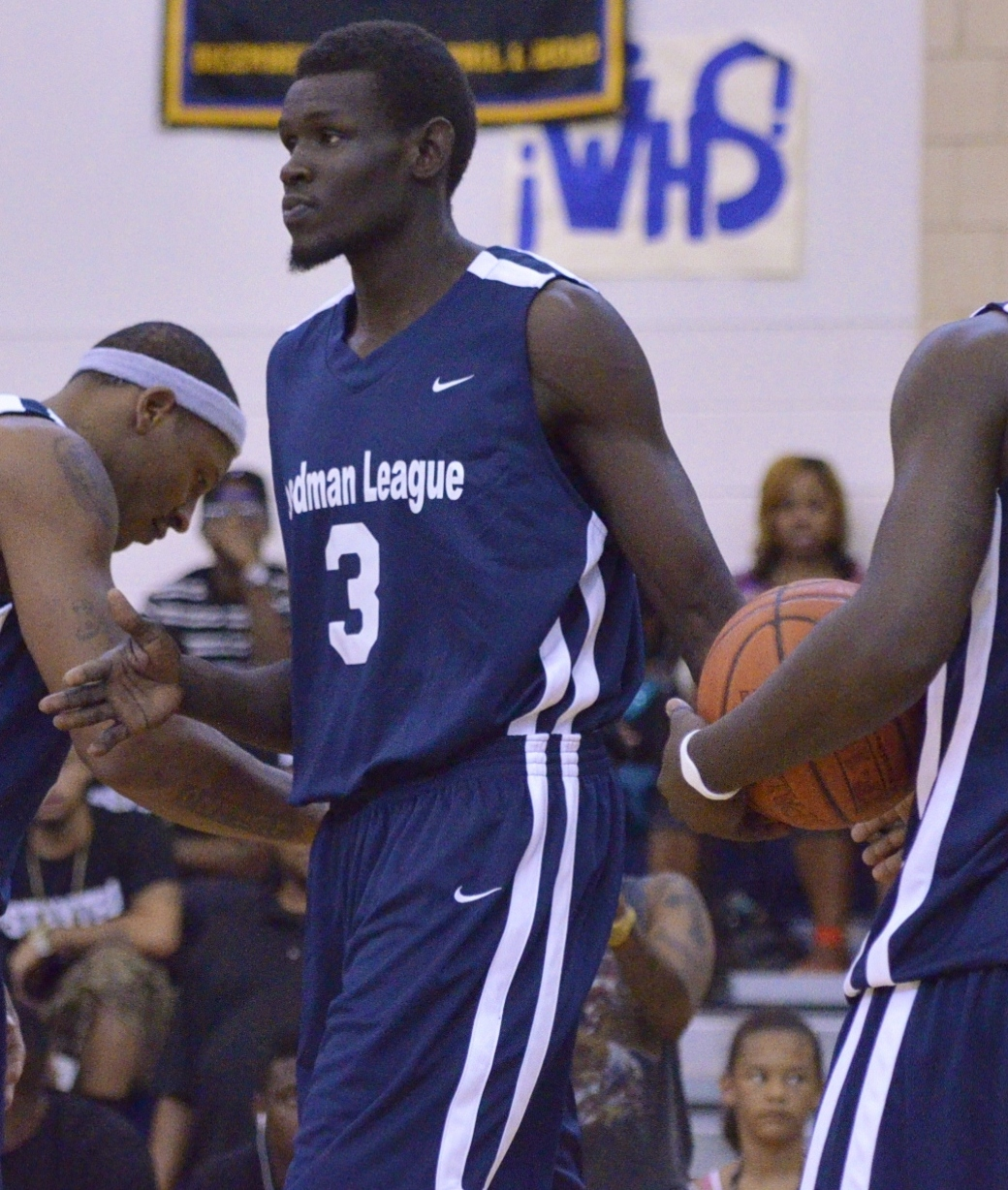
Ater Majok was a crucial part of the Thunder team that qualified for their first BAL season

As the national champions, they qualified for the Road to BAL, the qualifying rounds of the Basketball Africa League (BAL). In the 2024 offseason, the Thunder signed Tylor Ongwae, who joined the team after playing nine seasons in Europe. They also strengthened the roster with foreign players, including Will Davis and Uchenna Iroegbu. After advancing past the first round, the Thunder further increased their firepower by attracting continental veterans Abdoulaye Harouna and Ater Majok, who had both played in each previous BAL season. On December 2, they defeated City Oilers in the semifinals to qualify for the 2025 BAL season as the first Kenyan team in history. The Kenyans suffered heavy losses at the hands of Al Ahli Tripoli and APR, however, they were able to win one game against MBB, the first win by a Kenyan team. Nevertheless, the Thunder finished with a 1–5 record, leading to elimination in the group phase.

On September 14, 2025, the Thunder won their second straight Premier League championship. They went on to qualify for the BAL once again, after going undefeated in the qualifiers, and beating Ferroviário da Beira in the decisive game. On 2 October 2026, Nairobi City Thunder secured their third consecutive KBF Premier League championship, defeating Kenya Ports Authority 74–70 at Kasarani Indoor Arena to complete a 3–0 finals series sweep. The result extended their domestic league winning streak to 90 games across three unbeaten championship seasons

== Players ==
=== Current roster ===
Note: Flags indicate national team eligibility at FIBA-sanctioned events. Players may hold other non-FIBA nationalities not displayed.

Nairobi City Thunder roster
Players
Coaches

Pos.	No.	Nat.	Name	Ht.	Wt.
G	0	(United States) (Kenya)	Ogechi, Derrick	1.91 m (6 ft 3 in)	93 kg (205 lb)
CG	1	(South Sudan)	Diing, Garang	2.07 m (6 ft 9 in)	91 kg (201 lb)
PG	4	(South Sudan)	Alier, Moses	1.80 m (5 ft 11 in)	65 kg (143 lb)
SF	34	(Kenya)	Juma, Faheem	2.01 m (6 ft 7 in)	90 kg (198 lb)
SG	11	(Kenya)	Adera, Eugene	2.03 m (6 ft 8 in)	80 kg (176 lb)
F	12	(Kenya)	Ongwae, Tylor	2.01 m (6 ft 7 in)	93 kg (205 lb)
PF	15	(Kenya)	Koranga, Okall	2.06 m (6 ft 9 in)	91 kg (201 lb)
G/F	20	(United States) (Kenya)	Odero, Albert	1.96 m (6 ft 5 in)	82 kg (181 lb)
SG	8	(Kenya)	Shavanga, Larry	1.90 m (6 ft 3 in)	91 kg (201 lb)
PG	3	(Kenya)	Onsongo, Dismas	1.85 m (6 ft 1 in)	82 kg (181 lb)
C	55	(Kenya)	Okoth, Fidel	2.03 m (6 ft 8 in)	101 kg (223 lb)
PF	13	(Kenya)	Muchina, Bramwel	2.06 m (6 ft 9 in)	90 kg (198 lb)
	0		[[ | ]]

Head coach

- (United States) Brad Ibs

Assistant coach(es)

- (Kenya) Mshilla Rose

Legend

- (C) Team captain
- Injured

- Roster
Updated: March 17, 2026

=== Notable players ===
Note: Flags indicate national team eligibility at FIBA-sanctioned events. Players may hold other non-FIBA nationalities not displayed.

Criteria

To appear in this section a player must have either:

- Set a club record or won an individual award while at the club
- Played at least one official international match for their national team at any time
- Played at least one official NBA match at any time.

- (Kenya) Tylor Ongwae
- (Kenya) Derrick Ogechi
- (South Sudan) Ater Majok
- (Niger) Abdoulaye Harouna

== Head coaches ==
- (Kenya) Sadat Gaya: (–2023)
- (United States) Brad Ibs: (2023–present)
