= Oumar Ballo =

Oumar Ballo may refer to:

- Oumar Ballo (footballer) (born 1991), Malian footballer
- Oumar Ballo (basketball) (born 2002), Malian college basketball player
