= Donovan Williams (basketball) =

American basketball player (born 2001)

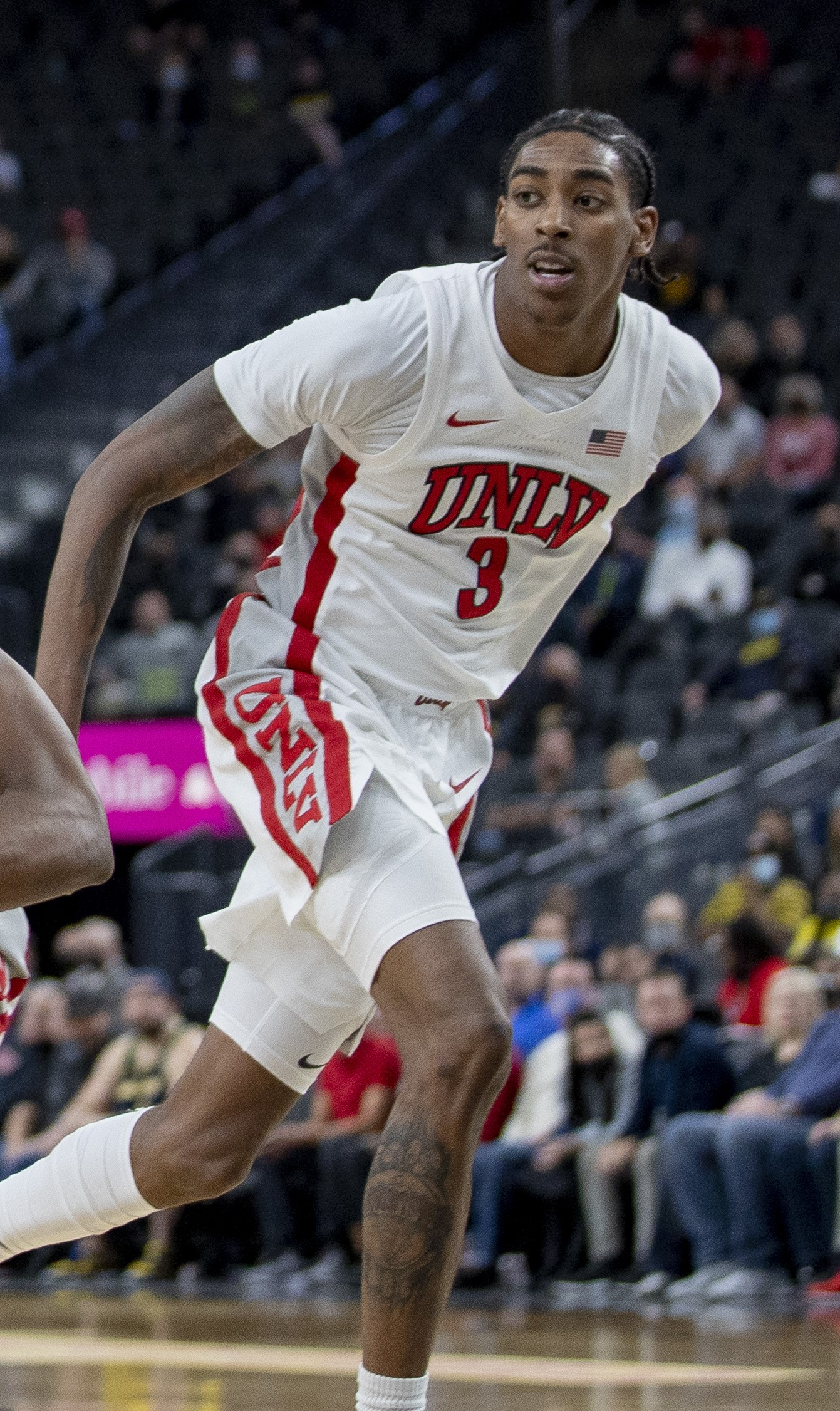
- Williams with UNLV in college

No. 3 – Al Riyadi
- Position: Shooting guard
- League: Lebanese Basketball League

Personal information
- Born: September 6, 2001 (age 25) Houston, Texas, U.S.
- Listed height: 6 ft 6 in (1.98 m)
- Listed weight: 190 lb (86 kg)

Career information
- High school: Elkins (Missouri City, Texas)
- College: Texas (2019–2021); UNLV (2021–2022)
- NBA draft: 2022: undrafted
- Playing career: 2022–present

Career history
- 2022–2023: Long Island Nets
- 2023: Atlanta Hawks
- 2023: →College Park Skyhawks
- 2023–2024: Santa Cruz Warriors
- 2024: Scarborough Shooting Stars
- 2024–2025: Westchester Knicks
- 2025: Shanghai Sharks
- 2026: Austin Spurs
- 2026: Al Ahly Ly
- 2026–present: Al Riyadi

Career highlights
- West Asia Super League champion (2025–26); West Asia Super League MVP (2026)
- Stats at NBA.com
- Stats at Basketball Reference

Donovan Kennedy Williams (born September 6, 2001) is an American professional basketball player for Al Riyadi of the Lebanese Basketball League. He played college basketball for the Texas Longhorns and the UNLV Runnin' Rebels.

== Early life and high school career ==
Williams grew up in Houston, Texas and attended Elkins High School. He entered college as a four-star prospect and was ranked No. 61 overall in the country by Rivals. His team won back-to-back district championships and he was named the district MVP. He was also a two-time first team all-district selection and two-time all-state team member. He averaged 18.2 points per contest while leading Elkins to a 31–8 record and a trip to the Class 6A regional semifinals as a senior. He averaged 13.2 points per game while helping Elkins to a 29–12 mark and a trip to the Class 5A state quarterfinals as a junior.

== College career ==
Williams started his college career at the University of Texas, and appeared in 26 games, making one start, averaged 11.0 minutes played per contest, averaged 3.3 points and 1.0 rebounds per game. He tallied a career-high 13 points twice during his freshman year and was named to the 2020 Academic All-Big 12 Men's Basketball Rookie Team. He later suffered a left knee injury at Texas Tech and missed the remainder of the season. During his sophomore year, he appeared in 15 games, averaging 10.1 minutes per contest. He scored 3.3 points per game with 1.1 rebounds per game and scored a season-high 11 points vs. Oklahoma. Selected to the 2021 Academic All-Big 12 Second Team. Williams transferred to the University of Nevada, Las Vegas for his junior year. On June 1, 2022, Williams declared for the 2022 NBA draft.

== Professional career ==
=== Long Island Nets (2022–2023) ===
After going undrafted in the 2022 NBA draft, on October 19, 2022, Williams signed a contract with the Long Island Nets.

In 18 games for the Nets during the Tip - Off Tournament, Williams averaged 15.3 points, 4.2 rebounds and 1.7 assists in 18 games played. For the regular season, he would only play in 8 games and averaged 15.6 points, 2.6 rebounds and 1.4 assists. He played his final game with the Nets on January 11, 2023.

=== Atlanta Hawks (2023) ===
On January 17, 2023, Williams signed a two-way contract with the Atlanta Hawks, splitting time with their NBA G League affiliate, College Park Skyhawks.

He finished the G League regular season with the Skyhawks, playing 24 games with them and averaging 12.8 points, 4.8 rebounds and 1.4 assists in 28.5 minutes per game. The Skyhawks would unfortunately miss the playoffs with a 15 - 17 record (11 - 13 in the 24 games that Williams played).

After the G League season, Williams made his NBA debut on April 4, 2023, in a 123–105 win over the Chicago Bulls, recording one rebound. On June 26, he was waived.

=== Santa Cruz Warriors (2023–2024) ===
On September 28, 2023, Williams signed with the Golden State Warriors, but was waived on October 16. On October 30, he joined the Santa Cruz Warriors.

With Santa Cruz, he averaged 12.1 points, 3.6 rebounds and 1.6 assists in 16 games for the Tip - Off Tournament. For the regular season, Williams would miss two games on February 3 and February 24, but played in the other 32 games of the season and averaged 20.1 points, 4.3 rebounds and 1.9 assists in 29.1 minutes per game. The Warriors made the playoffs and would win their first round game against the Salt Lake City Stars 113 - 111 on April 2. Sadly, the Warriors faltered in the Semifinals on April 4 in a 109 - 112 loss to the Stockton Kings. In those two playoff games, Williams averaged 9 points and 3.5 rebounds.

=== Scarborough Shooting Stars (2024) ===
On May 14, 2024, Williams signed with the Scarborough Shooting Stars of the Canadian Elite Basketball League.

In 10 games with the Shooting Stars, Williams averaged 17.8 points, 5.6 rebounds and 2.2 assists.

=== Westchester Knicks (2024–2025) ===
On October 28, 2024, Williams joined the Westchester Knicks.

Williams participated in all 17 games for the team in the Tip - Off Tournament, averaging 15.4 points, 4.6 rebounds and 2.3 assists. However, he would not stay with the team throughout the entire regular season and only played in 17 of the club's 34 games before leaving to play overseas. In Williams' final game with the Knicks on February 25, 2025, he was the team's leading scorer with 34 points and also recorded 6 rebounds and 6 assists as the Knicks fell to the Birmingham Squadron 119 - 126.

=== Shanghai Sharks (2025) ===
On February 21, 2025, Williams joined the Shanghai Sharks of the Chinese Basketball Association (CBA).

== Career statistics ==
Legend
GP	Games played	GS	Games started	MPG	Minutes per game
FG%	Field goal percentage	3P%	3-point field goal percentage	FT%	Free throw percentage
RPG	Rebounds per game	APG	Assists per game	SPG	Steals per game
BPG	Blocks per game	PPG	Points per game	**Bold**	Career high

=== NBA ===
Year	Team	GP	GS	MPG	FG%	3P%	FT%	RPG	APG	SPG	BPG	PPG
2022–23	Atlanta	2	0	2.1	.400	.000	–	1.0	.0	.0	.0	2.0
Career		2	0	2.1	.400	.000	–	1.0	.0	.0	.0	2.0

=== College ===
Year	Team	GP	GS	MPG	FG%	3P%	FT%	RPG	APG	SPG	BPG	PPG
2019–20	Texas	26	1	11.0	.368	.244	.706	1.0	.3	.5	.2	3.3
2020–21	Texas	15	0	10.3	.304	.174	**.846**	1.1	.3	.3	.2	3.3
2021–22	UNLV	**27**	**13**	**22.1**	**.488**	**.436**	.638	**3.3**	**1.1**	**.7**	**.4**	**12.7**
Career		68	14	15.3	.435	.338	.667	2.0	.6	.5	.3	7.0

== Personal life ==
Williams' sister, Kelsey, played in the WNBA.
