= Basketball Africa League =

Basketball league

- Organising body: NBA Africa; FIBA
- Founded: February 2019; 7 years ago
- First season: 2021
- Country: FIBA Africa member countries
- Confederation: FIBA Africa
- Divisions: 3
- Number of teams: 12
- Current champions: (Rwanda) RSSB Tigers (1st title) (2026)
- Most championships: Six teams (1 title each)
- All-time top scorer: Chris Crawford (547 points)
- Commissioner: Amadou Gallo Fall
- Website: theBAL.com
- 2026 BAL season

The Basketball Africa League (BAL) is the premier men's basketball league in Africa. Founded in 2019, the league was established and is co-organized by NBA Africa and the International Basketball Federation (FIBA).

Each season typically runs from March to June, and in the current format of the league consists of twelve teams. Each of the teams qualify through their performance in their domestic competition. Seven teams qualify directly, while five others have to play in the Road to BAL. The group stage is divided into three conferences, which are followed by playoffs to determine the champions. The BAL champions of each season automatically qualify for the FIBA Intercontinental Cup.

The first season was held in 2021 and thus far, five different champions have won the competition.

== History ==
On 16 February 2019 the National Basketball Association and FIBA announced plans to establish a continental professional basketball league. During a press conference at the 2019 NBA All-Star weekend, NBA commissioner Adam Silver elaborated on plans to establish the league. He stated that the league will feature 12 teams after qualification tournaments in late 2019. The countries that could possibly host a team include: Angola, Egypt, Kenya, Morocco, Nigeria, Rwanda, Senegal, South Africa and Tunisia. Silver also hinted at the involvement of former U.S. president Barack Obama in an unspecified role. In May 2019, Amadou Gallo Fall was assigned by the NBA as the first president of the BAL. In September 2019, BAL announced the venues and cities for the inaugural season, which included a Final Four played in Kigali Arena in Kigali, Rwanda.

On 15 October 2019, the qualifying tournaments for the inaugural season began, with teams from 32 African countries participating. The start of the BAL was eventually postponed twice due to the disruptive COVID-19 pandemic. The first BAL game was played on 16 May 2021, in the Kigali Arena in Kigali, Rwanda, which hosted the entire tournament. The season was held in a bio-secure bubble with only limited attendance allowed. On 30 May, Zamalek from Egypt won the first-ever BAL championship after beating US Monastir in the inaugural final.

The following season, the league expanded it format with five-team conferences (the Sahara and Nile Conference), which were held in Dakar and Cairo. The playoffs were held in Kigali.

The fourth league season, in 2024, saw an expansion to three conference with the Kalahari Conference, as well as Petro de Luanda becoming the first team from Sub-Saharan Africa to win the championship. After the season, Ulrich Chomche from Cameroon became the first former BAL player to be drafted in the National Basketball Association (NBA), as he was picked in the second round of the 2024 NBA draft.

The 2025 season was won by Al Ahli Tripoli, who were the first team to advance all the way through the qualifying rounds to win the championship. The league also hosted its first finals outside of Rwanda, with the South African city of Pretoria being the host. On June 25, 2025, Khaman Maluach was drafted 10th overall in the 2025 NBA draft, becoming the highest former BAL player to be drafted into the NBA.

In September 2025, NBA Commissioner Adam Silver announced the intention of the league to move to a closed league with permanent franchises.

== Format ==
Each BAL season consists of twelve teams. In the regular season, the twelve teams are divided into three conferences (the Sahara Conference, Nile Conference, and Kalahari Conference), in which each team plays the other in a round-robin format.

The two highest-placed teams of each conference, as well as the two best third-ranked teams, advance to the playoffs, which is a single-elimination tournament which decides the BAL champion.

=== Qualification ===
Similar to the Basketball Champions League and football competition CAF Champions League, the BAL has qualifying rounds to determine the teams that qualify for each season. National federations from African countries are given the opportunity to send one representing club, usually the champions of the respective national league. In the Road to BAL, teams play each other in groups for six remaining spots in the BAL regular season. In the first round, all participating teams are divided over groups, with the top teams advancing to the Elite 16. There, another group stage follows before single-game eliminations are played in the semi-finals and finals.

Six teams from six predetermined countries qualify directly for the regular season, without playing qualifiers, to make for a total of twelve teams. These countries have been determined based on basketball history and commercial market size, and have thus far been Angola, Egypt, Tunisia, Morocco (only in 2021), Nigeria, Rwanda (since 2022) and Senegal.

=== Foreign players restrictions ===
From 2021 to 2024, each club participating in the BAL regular season was restricted to having four foreign players on its team, which means it has to have at least eight local players on its roster. Furthermore, two out of four foreign players had to be from another African country. A maximum of 2 out of the 4 foreign players can be from outside of Africa. Since the 2024 season, clubs have been able to field more foreign players.

=== BAL Elevate program ===
Ahead of the 2022 season, the BAL launched the BAL Elevate program in cooperation with the NBA Academy Africa. The program places a player from the academy in one of the team's rosters. Players from the same country as a BAL team are automatically assigned to a team, while remaining players are selected from a pool. Elevate players do not share in the prize money that is awarded from the competition, to preserve their amateur status.

== Teams ==
Location of teams of the 2026 BAL season .

A total of 30 teams from 21 countries have played in the BAL.

=== Current teams ===
The following are the twelve teams of the 2026 BAL season.

Conference	Team	City, Country	National league	National titles	Founded
Kalahari Conference	(Libya) Al Ahly Ly	Benghazi, Libya	Libyan Division I Basketball League	4	1950
Kalahari Conference	(Tanzania) Dar City	Dar es Salaam, Tanzania	Tanzanian National Basketball League	2	2023
Kalahari Conference	(South Africa) Johannesburg Giants	Johannesburg, South Africa	Basketball National League	1	2025
Kalahari Conference	(Kenya) Nairobi City Thunder	Nairobi, Kenya	KBF Premier League	3	1998
Kalahari Conference	(Angola) Petro de Luanda	Luanda, Angola	Angolan Basketball League	18	1980
Kalahari Conference	(Rwanda) RSSB Tigers	Kigali, Rwanda	Rwanda Basketball League	1	2019
Sahara Conference	(Egypt) Al Ahly	Cairo, Egypt	Egyptian Basketball Super League	9	1930
Sahara Conference	(Senegal) ASC Ville de Dakar	Dakar, Senegal	Nationale 1	2	1980
Sahara Conference	(Tunisia) Club Africain	Tunis, Tunisia	Championnat National A	5	1956
Sahara Conference	(Morocco) FUS Rabat	Rabat, Morocco	Division Excellence	20	1946
Sahara Conference	(Ivory Coast) JCA Kings	Abidjan, Ivory Coast	Ligue d'Or	1	2010
Sahara Conference	(Nigeria) Maktown Flyers	Lagos, Nigeria	Nigerian Premier League	1	2021

== Results ==
=== List of finals ===
Edition	Year	Hosts and venue	Champions	Score and Venue	Runners-up	Third place	Score and Venue	Fourth place	No. of teams
1	2021	Kigali, Rwanda	(Egypt); Zamalek	76–63; Kigali Arena, Kigali	(Tunisia); US Monastir	(Angola); Petro de Luanda	97–68; Kigali Arena, Kigali	(Rwanda); Patriots	12
2	2022	Kigali, Rwanda	(Tunisia); US Monastir	83–72; BK Arena, Kigali	(Angola); Petro de Luanda	(Egypt); Zamalek	97–74; BK Arena, Kigali	(Cameroon); FAP	12
3	2023	Kigali, Rwanda	(Egypt); Al Ahly	80–65; BK Arena, Kigali	(Senegal); AS Douanes	(Mali); Stade Malien	73–65; BK Arena, Kigali	(Angola); Petro de Luanda	12
4	2024	Kigali, Rwanda	(Angola); Petro de Luanda	107–94; BK Arena, Kigali	(Libya); Al Ahly Ly	(Nigeria); Rivers Hoopers	80–57; BK Arena, Kigali	(South Africa); Cape Town Tigers	12
5	2025	Pretoria, South Africa	(Libya); Al Ahli Tripoli	88–67; SunBet Arena, Pretoria	(Angola); Petro de Luanda	(Rwanda); APR	123–90; SunBet Arena, Pretoria	(Egypt); Al Ittihad Alexandria	12
6	2026	Kigali, Rwanda	(Rwanda); RSSB Tigers	90–88; BK Arena, Kigali	(Angola); Petro de Luanda	(Libya); Al Ahly Ly	106–98; BK Arena, Kigali	(Egypt); Al Ahly	12

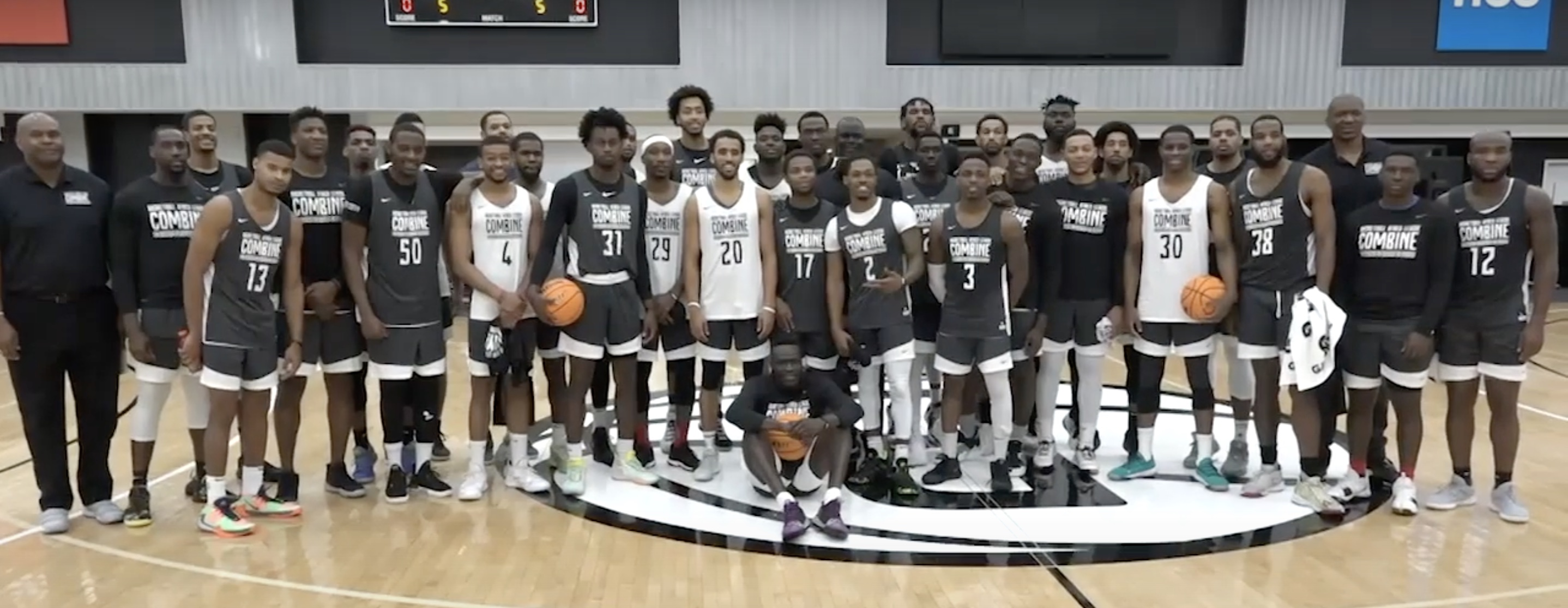
Players in Brooklyn, New York during the first-ever BAL Combine in 2020

=== Performance by club ===
Performances in the Basketball Africa League (BAL) by club
Club	Titles	Runners-up	Years won	Years runners-up
(Angola) Petro de Luanda	1	3	2024	2022, 2025, 2026
(Tunisia) US Monastir	1	1	2022	2021
(Rwanda) RSSB Tigers	1	0	2026	—
(Libya) Al Ahli Tripoli	1	0	2025	—
(Egypt) Al Ahly	1	0	2023	—
(Egypt) Zamalek	1	0	2021	—
(Senegal) AS Douanes	0	1	—	2023
(Libya) Al Ahly Ly	0	1	—	2024

=== Performance by country ===
Performances in the BAL by nation
Club	Titles	Runners-up	Years won	Years runners-up
Egypt	2	0	2021, 2023	—
Angola	1	3	2024	2022, 2025, 2026
Tunisia	1	1	2022	2021
Libya	1	1	2025	2024
Rwanda	1	0	2026	—
Senegal	0	1	—	2023

== Records and statistics ==
Solo Diabate and Michael Fakuade have won two BAL championships, and are the only players to have won multiple titles. Chris Crawford is the all-time scoring leader of the league, having scored 341 points in three seasons.

=== All-time participants ===
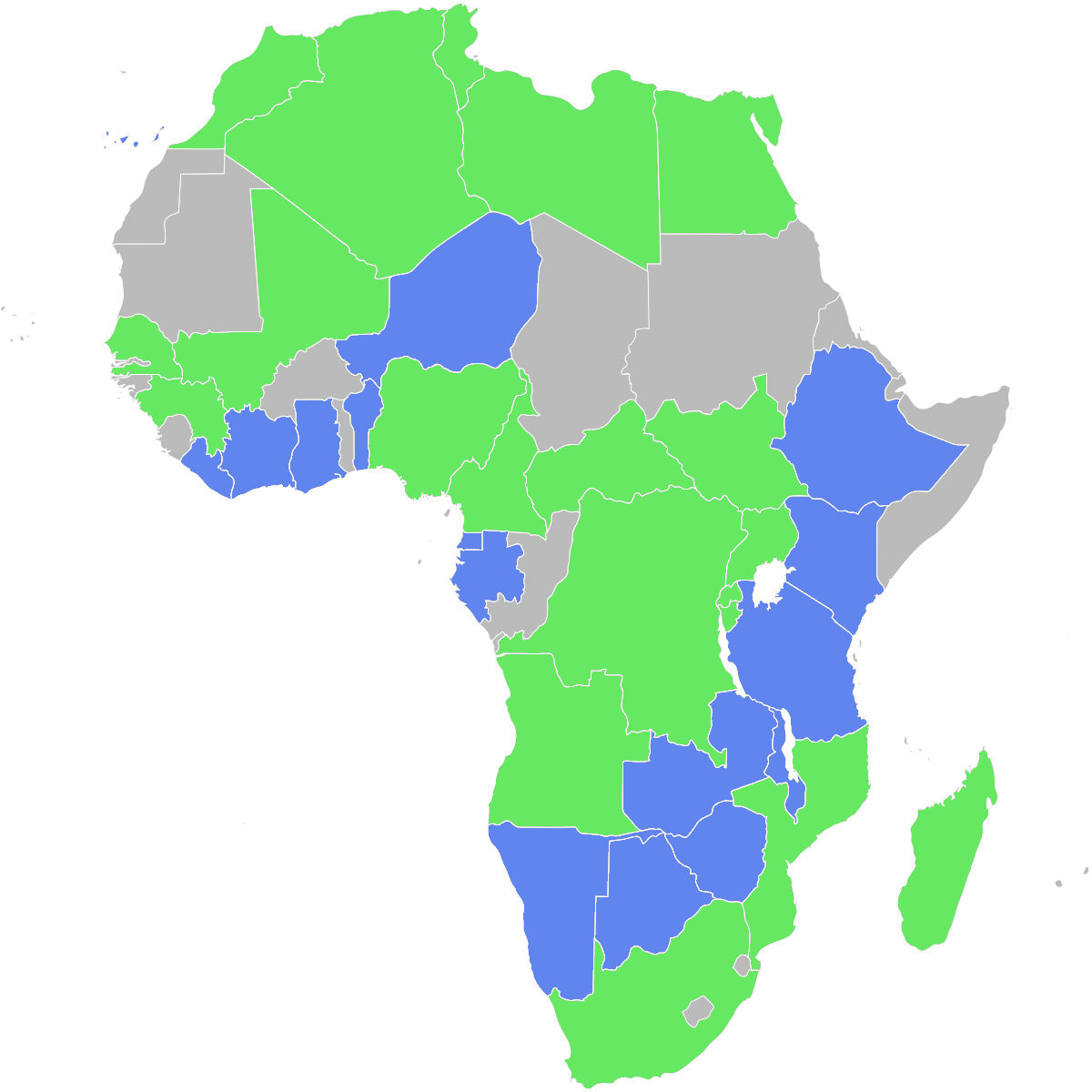
Map of countries, teams from which have played in the main tournament and qualifying rounds of the Basketball Africa League. Not represented FIBA member country that has been represented in the regular season FIBA member country that has been represented in the qualifying rounds

The following is a list of clubs who have played in the Basketball Africa League at any time since its formation in 2020 to the current season. A total of 41 teams have played in or qualified for the BAL.

1st	Champions
2nd	Runners-up
3rd	Third place
4th	Fourth place
QF	Quarterfinalists
GS	Group phase
Q	Qualified for an upcoming season

Team	2021	2022	2023	2024	2025	2026	Total seasons
(Algeria) MC Alger (Note: As "GS Pétroliers" (2021).)	GS	—N/a	—N/a	—N/a	—N/a	—N/a	1
(Angola) Petro de Luanda	3rd	2nd	4th	1st	2nd	2nd	6
(Burundi) Dynamo	—N/a	—N/a	—N/a	GS (Note: Dynamo only played one game in the 2024 season as they were disqualified after their first game.)	—N/a	—N/a	1
(Central African Republic) Bangui SC	—N/a	—N/a	—N/a	GS	—N/a	—N/a	1
(Ivory Coast) ABC Fighters	—N/a	—N/a	QF	—N/a	—N/a	—N/a	1
(Ivory Coast) JCA Kings	—N/a	—N/a	—N/a	—N/a	—N/a	GS	1
(Cameroon) FAP	QF	4th	—N/a	—N/a	—N/a	—N/a	2
(Cape Verde) Kriol Star	—N/a	—N/a	—N/a	—N/a	QF	—N/a	1
(Democratic Republic of the Congo) Espoir Fukash	—N/a	GS	—N/a	—N/a	—N/a	—N/a	1
(Egypt) Al Ahly	—N/a	—N/a	1st	QF	—N/a	4th	3
(Egypt) Al Ittihad Alexandria	—N/a	—N/a	—N/a	—N/a	4th	—N/a	1
(Egypt) Zamalek	1st	3rd	—N/a	—N/a	—N/a	—N/a	2
(Guinea) SLAC	—N/a	QF	GS	—N/a	—N/a	—N/a	2
(Kenya) Nairobi City Thunder	—N/a	—N/a	—N/a	—N/a	GS	GS	2
(Libya) Al Ahly Ly	—N/a	—N/a	—N/a	2nd	—N/a	3rd	2
(Libya) Al Ahli Tripoli	—N/a	—N/a	—N/a	—N/a	1st	—N/a	1
(Madagascar) GNBC	GS	—N/a	—N/a	—N/a	—N/a	—N/a	1
(Mali) AS Police	GS	—N/a	—N/a	—N/a	—N/a	—N/a	1
(Mali) Stade Malien	—N/a	—N/a	3rd	—N/a	GS	—N/a	2
(Morocco) AS Salé	QF	QF	—N/a	—N/a	—N/a	—N/a	2
(Morocco) FUS Rabat	—N/a	—N/a	—N/a	QF	QF	QF	3
(Mozambique) Ferroviário da Beira	—N/a	GS	QF	—N/a	—N/a	—N/a	2
(Mozambique) Ferroviário de Maputo	QF	—N/a	—N/a	—N/a	—N/a	—N/a	1
(Nigeria) Kwara Falcons	—N/a	—N/a	GS	—N/a	—N/a	—N/a	1
(Nigeria) Maktown Flyers	—N/a	—N/a	—N/a	—N/a	—N/a	GS	1
(Nigeria) Rivers Hoopers	GS	—N/a	—N/a	3rd	QF	—N/a	3
(South Africa) Cape Town Tigers	—N/a	QF	QF	4th	—N/a	—N/a	3
(South Africa) Johannesburg Giants	—N/a	—N/a	—N/a	—N/a	—N/a	GS	1
(South Africa) MBB	—N/a	—N/a	—N/a	—N/a	GS	—N/a	1
(Rwanda) APR	—N/a	—N/a	—N/a	GS	3rd	—N/a	2
(Rwanda) Patriots	4th	—N/a	—N/a	—N/a	—N/a	—N/a	1
(Rwanda) REG	—N/a	QF	QF	—N/a	—N/a	—N/a	2
(Rwanda) RSSB Tigers	—N/a	—N/a	—N/a	—N/a	—N/a	1st	1
(Senegal) ASCVD	—N/a	—N/a	—N/a	—N/a	GS	QF	2
(Senegal) AS Douanes	QF	—N/a	2nd	QF	—N/a	—N/a	3
(Senegal) DUC	—N/a	GS	—N/a	—N/a	—N/a	—N/a	1
(Uganda) City Oilers	—N/a	—N/a	GS	GS	—N/a	—N/a	2
(South Sudan) Cobra Sport	—N/a	GS	—N/a	—N/a	—N/a	—N/a	1
(Tanzania) Dar City	—N/a	—N/a	—N/a	—N/a	—N/a	QF	1
(Tunisia) US Monastir	2nd	1st	GS	QF	QF	—N/a	5
(Tunisia) Club Africain	—N/a	—N/a	—N/a	—N/a	—N/a	QF	1

== Sponsorship and partnerships ==
Since its inception, the BAL has been sponsored by multiple multinational organisations, including: Air Jordan, Flutterwave, French Development Agency (AFD), Hennessy, New Fortress Energy, Nike, RwandAir, Visit Rwanda, and Wilson.

== Trophy and prize money ==
The champions of the BAL finals receive the competitions' trophy, which is inspired by the adansonia (more commonly known as baobab), a common type of tree in Africa. Since the 2025 season, the players and coaches on the championship team also receive championship rings, following a North American sports tradition.

In the inaugural season in 2021, the champions reportedly received $100,000 in prize money; runners-up received $75,000; third place $55,000 and fourth place $25,000.

== Organisation, ownership and investments ==
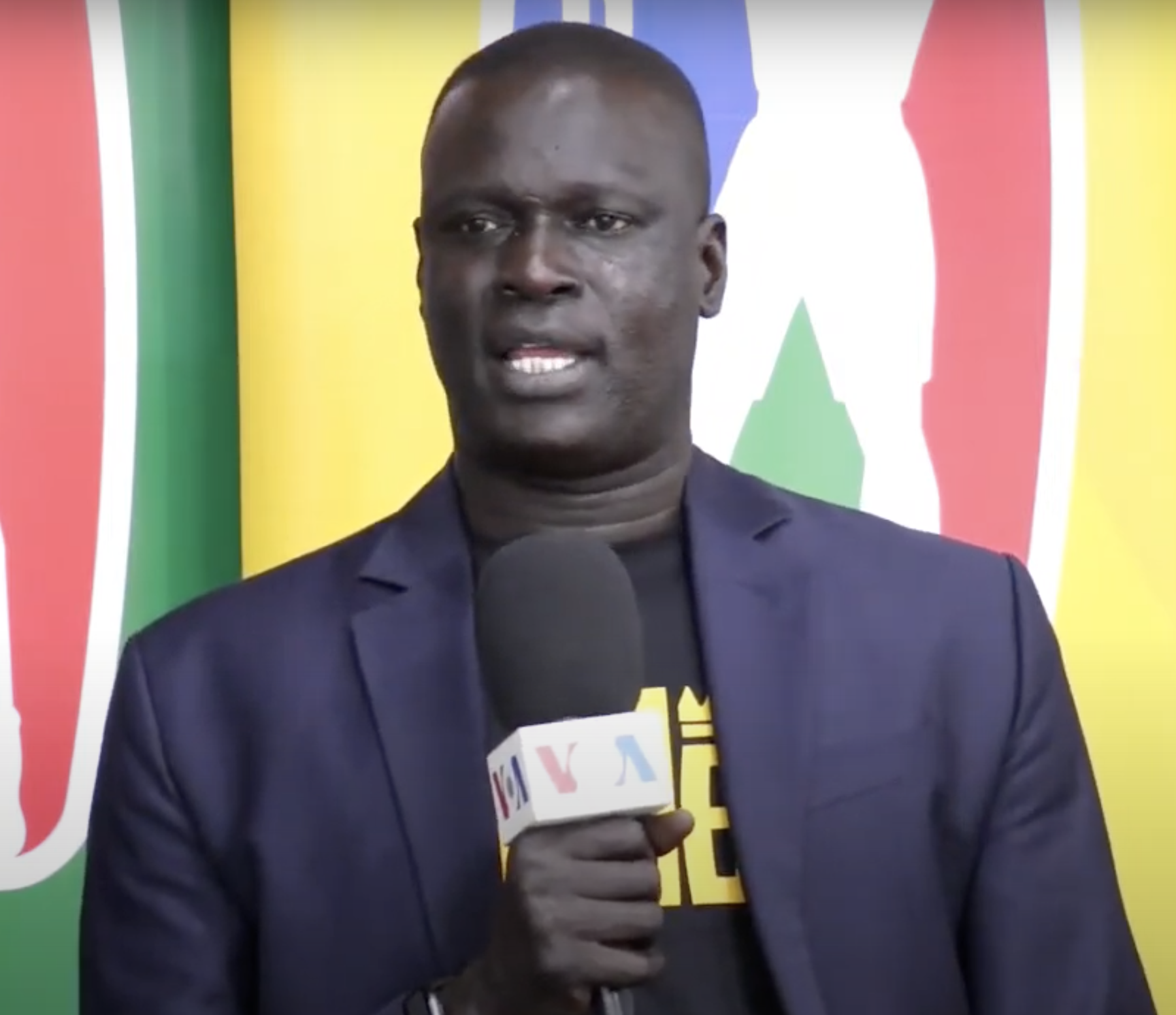
Amadou Gallo Fall is the first President of the BAL, since assuming the position in 2021

The BAL is owned and operated by NBA Africa, a sub-entity of the NBA which was established in May 2021. Since then, the league has been driven by private investments. At the moment of establishment, strategic investors including a consortium of Babatunde "Tunde" Folawiyo, Helios Fairfax Partners Corporation (HFP). Other investors included former players such as Dikembe Mutombo, Junior Bridgeman, Luol Deng, Grant Hill, Joakim Noah and Ian Mahinmi. Two months later, it was announced that former President of the United States Barack Obama joined NBA Africa as a strategic partner while also purchasing a minority stake in the organisation. NBA commissioner Adam Silver stated that NBA Africa was valued at $1 billion.

The organisation of the league currently exists out of:

- Amadou Gallo Fall (Commissioner)
- John Manyo-Plange (Vice-President)
- Victor Williams (CEO NBA Africa)

=== Criticism and controversies ===
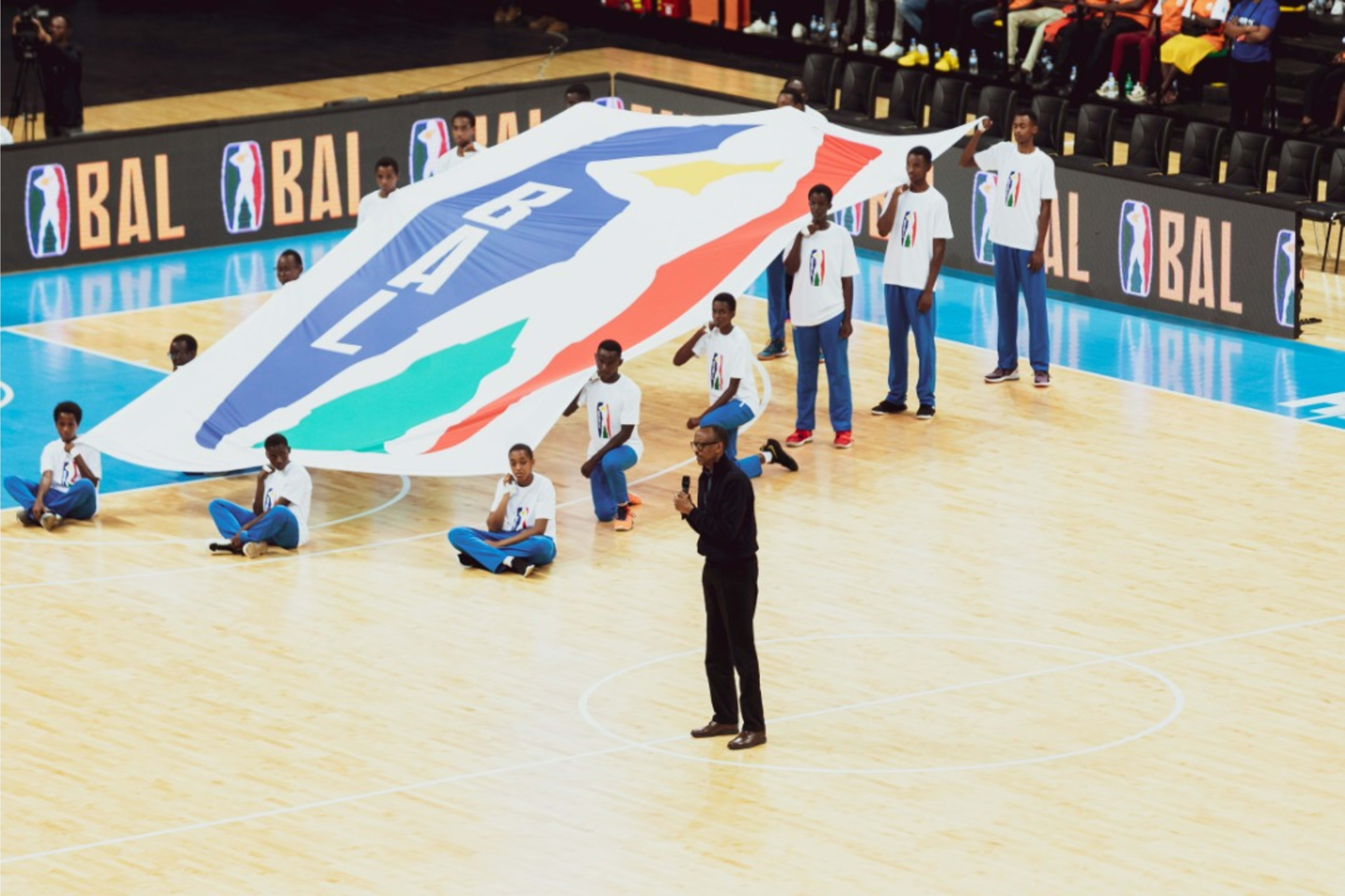
President of Rwanda Paul Kagame at a ceremony for the unveiling of the BAL logo in Kigali in 2018

The Human Rights Foundation has criticized the BAL for maintaining close relations with Paul Kagame and his Rwandan authoritarian government, and has sent an official letter to the NBA regarding the matter. Other newspapers such as The Guardian and Bloomberg News have also described the league as being a tool for sportswashing for the Rwandan government's repression and the regime's involvement in the Rwandan Civil War.

== Media coverage ==
The BAL games are broadcasting as many as 215 countries in 14 languages. All BAL games are broadcast by:

Location	Broadcaster
(African Union) Africa	ESPN Africa
(African Union) Africa	Visionview.tv (online)
(African Union) Africa	Canal+ Afrique
(African Union) Africa	Voice of Africa Radio
Canada	NBATV Canada
Canada	TSN
China	Tencent Sports
Middle East	OnTime Sports
Egypt	Zamalek TV (Zamalek games only)
Morocco	Arryadia (AS Salé games only)
Tunisia	El Watania 2 (US Monastir games only)
United States	ESPN+
United States	NBA TV
United States	Voice of America
International	beIN Sports
International	theBAL.com (online)

== See also ==
- FIBA Africa Basketball League
- African Football League
- Basketball in Africa
