= Kenya Ports Authority (basketball) =

KPA
- Nickname: Dockers
- Leagues: KBF Premier League
- Arena: KPA Makande Gymnasium
- Location: Mombasa, Kenya
- Team colors: Dark blue, light blue, white
- Team manager: Christopher Ogutu
- Head coach: Samuel Nganga
- Ownership: Kenya Ports Authority
- Championships: 9 Premier Leagues
Home	Away

Kenya Ports Authority, commonly known as KPA, is a basketball club based in Mombasa, Kenya. Owned by the Kenya Ports Authority corporation, the team is nicknamed the "Dockers", and is the most decorated team in basketball as it has won a record nine KBF Premier League championships.

The team plays its home games in the KPA Makande Gymnasium.

KPA made its debut in international competition during the 2002 FIBA Africa Clubs Champions Cup, and lost its six games in the competition. KPA made their debut in the Road to BAL competition in 2019.

== Women's team ==
The women's team of KPA has won the FIBA Africa Zone 5 Club Championship a record nine times.

== Roster ==
The following is the KPA roster for the 2020 BAL Qualifying Tournaments:

Note: Flags indicate national team eligibility at FIBA-sanctioned events. Players may hold other non-FIBA nationalities not displayed.

Kenya Ports Authority roster
Players
Coaches

Pos.	No.	Nat.	Name
	4	(Kenya)	Kidong'o, Antony
PF	5	(Kenya)	Koranga, Okall
	6	(Kenya)	Odhiambo, Dickson
SG	7	(Kenya)	Wachira, Kennedy
PG	8	(Democratic Republic of the Congo)	Kazunguzibwa, Michael
G	9	(Kenya)	Odendo, Victor
	10	(Kenya)	Oyugi, Keegan
	11	(Kenya)	Letting, Evans
PF	12	(Kenya)	Nyakinda, Valentine
	13	(Kenya)	Ereng, Ekiru
	14	(Kenya)	Ayodi, Job

Head coach

- (Kenya) Samuel Nganga

Assistant coach(es)

- (Kenya) Cliff Owuor

Legend

- (C) Team captain
- Injured

- Roster
Updated: 17 October 2019

== Honours ==
- KBF Premier League (record)
  - Winners (9): 1987, 1990, 1991, 2014, 2016, 2017, 2018, 2022, 2023

== In international competitions ==
East, Central and Southern Africa Club Championships

- 2002 – (silver) Runner-up

FIBA Africa Clubs Champions Cup

- 2002 – 7th Place

BAL Qualifying Tournaments

- 2020 – Second Round
