= KBF Premier League =

Top Kenyan basketball division

- Organising body: Kenyan Basketball Federation
- Founded: 1987
- First season: 1987
- Country: Kenya
- Number of teams: 12
- Level on pyramid: 1
- Relegation to: KBF Division 1
- International cup: Basketball Africa League (BAL)
- Current champions: Nairobi City Thunder (2nd title) (2024–25)
- Most championships: KPA (9 titles)
- 2023–24 KBF Premier League

The KBF Premier League, also known as the KBF National Basketball Classic League, is the premier basketball league for clubs in Kenya. The league currently consist out of twelve teams. The most successful team in the history of the league is KPA with nine national championships.

The champions of the KBF Premier League are eligible to play in the qualifying rounds of the Basketball Africa League (BAL).

The league was established in 1987 and has been won by seven different clubs since then.

== Current teams ==
The following were the twelve teams for the 2024 season: Men:

- ABSA Bank
- ANU Wolfpack
- Eldonets
- Equity Dumas
- KPA
- Kenyatta University Pirates
- Nairobi City Thunder
- Strathmore Blades
- Ulinzi Warriors
- Umoja
- USIU Tigers
- University of Nairobi Terrorists

Women:

- ANU Panthers
- Eldonets
- Equity
- KPA
- Safe Spaces
- Stanbic Aces
- Storms
- Strathmore Swords
- The Swish
- USIU Flames
- University of Nairobi Terrorists
- Zetech Sparks

== List of champions ==
- 1987: KPA
- 1988: Barclays Eagles
- 1989: Posta
- 1990: KPA
- 1991: KPA
- 1992: Posta
- 1993: Posta
- 1994: Co-op Bank
- 1995: Co-op Bank
- 1996: Co-op Bank
- 1997: Co-op Bank
- 1999: Ulinzi Warriors
- 2000: NSSF Stars
- 2001: KCB Lions
- 2002: Ulinzi Warriors
- 2003: Ulinzi Warriors
- 2004: Ulinzi Warriors
- 2005: Ulinzi Warriors
- 2006: Ulinzi Warriors
- 2007: KCB Lions
- 2008: KCB Lions
- 2009: KCB Lions
- 2010: Co-op Bank
- 2011: Co-op Bank
- 2012: Co-op Bank
- 2014: KPA
- 2015: Ulinzi Warriors
- 2016: KPA
- 2017: KPA
- 2018: KPA
- 2019: Ulinzi Warriors
- 2022: KPA
- 2023: KPA
- 2024: Nairobi City Thunder
- 2025: Nairobi City Thunder

== Performance by club ==
Club	Winners	Runners-up	Years won	Years runner-up
KPA	9	3	1987, 1990, 1991, 2014, 2016, 2017, 2018, 2022, 2023	2009, 2024, 2025
Ulinzi Warriors	8	3	1999, 2002, 2003, 2004, 2005, 2006, 2015, 2019	2014, 2018, 2022
Co-op Bank	7	1	1994, 1995, 1996, 1997, 2010, 2011, 2012	2016
KCB Lions	4	2	2001, 2007, 2008, 2009	2010, 2011
Posta	3	—	1989, 1992, 1993	—
Nairobi City Thunder	2	1	2024, 2025	2019
Barclays Eagles	1	—	1988	—
NSSF Stars	1	—	2000	—
USIU Tigers	—	2	—	2012, 2015
Blades	—	1	—	2017
Equity Dumas	—	1	—	2023

== Finals (2009–present) ==
Season	Champions	Runners-up	Finals score	Ref.
2009	KCB Lions (4)	KPA	2–0	
2010	Co-op Bank (4)	KCB Lions		
2011	Co-op Bank (5)	KCB Lions		
2012	Co-op Bank (6)	USIU Tigers	3–0	
2014	KPA (4)	Ulinzi Warriors	3–1	
2015	Ulinzi Warriors (7)	USIU Tigers	3–0	
2016	KPA (5)	Co-op Bank	3–1	
2017	KPA (6)	Blades	3–0	
2018	KPA (7)	Ulinzi Warriors	3–0	
2019	Ulinzi Warriors (8)	Nairobi City Thunder	3–1	
2021–22	KPA (8)	Ulinzi Warriors	3–2	
2023	KPA (9)	Equity Dumas	3–1	
2023–24	Nairobi City Thunder	KPA	3–0	
2024–25	Nairobi City Thunder	KPA	3–0	

== Individual awards ==
Most Valuable Player

- 2021–22: Kennedy Wachira (KPA)
- 2022-23: Eugene Adera (KPA)
- 2023–24: Albert Odero (Nairobi City Thunder)

Playoffs MVP

- 2023–24: Griffin Ligare (Nairobi City Thunder)
