= Afro-Spaniards =

Ethnic group in Spain

Afroespañoles (Spanish)
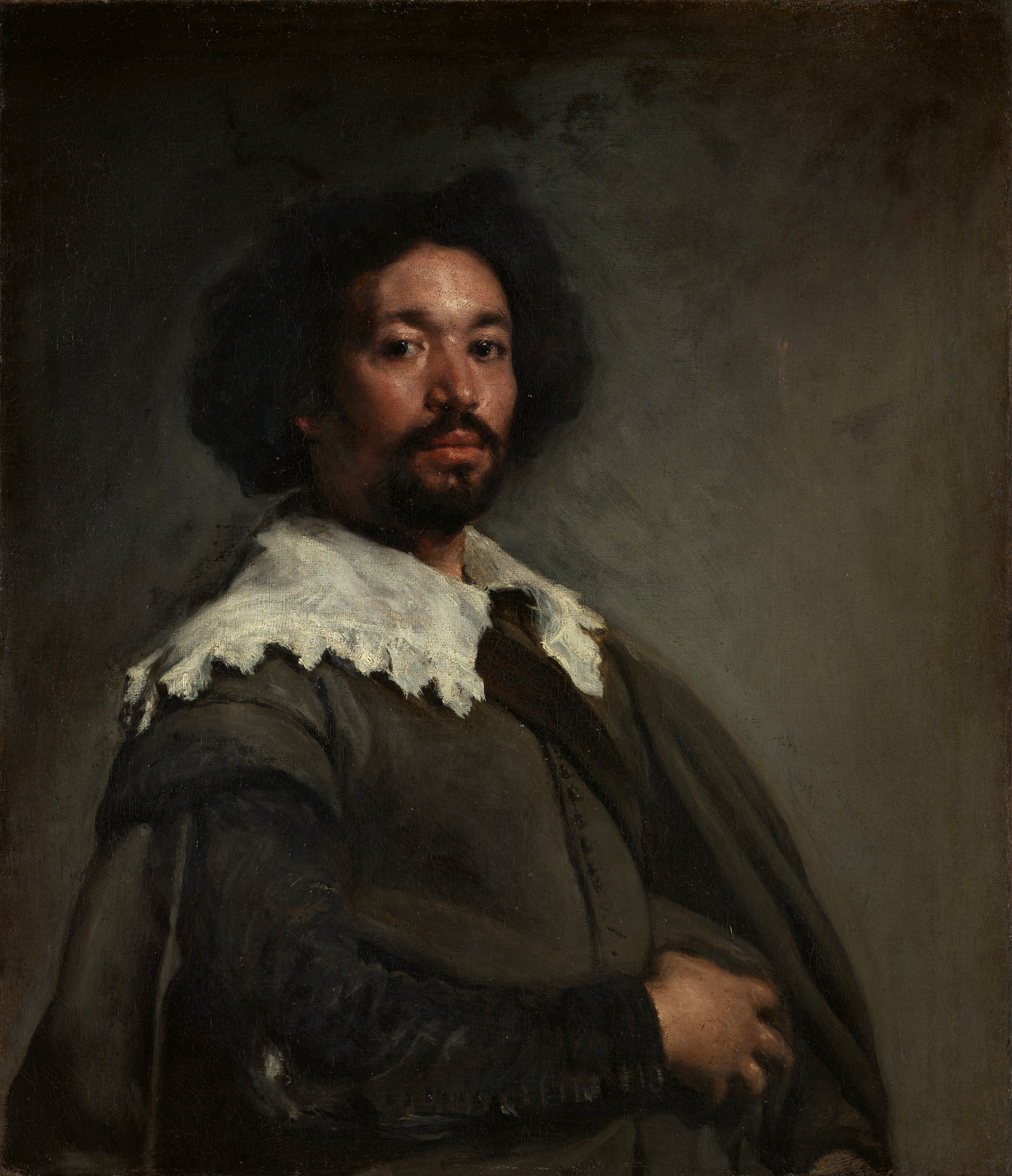
- Portrait of Juan de Pareja (1650) by Diego Velázquez, the painting portrays Juan de Pareja, an Afro-Spanish painter.

Total population
- 1,322,625 in 2022 (Of those ~350,000 are Black Sub-Saharan Africans)

Regions with significant populations
- Andalusia, Catalonia, the Balearics, the Canaries, Madrid, Murcia, Valencia

Languages
- Spanish; English, French, Portuguese, various languages of Africa

Religion
- Predominantly Christian (mainly Roman Catholic), Sunni Islam, Traditional African religions, others, nonreligious

Related ethnic groups
- African people, Spanish Equatoguinean, Cape Verdean Spanish, Afro-European

Afro-Spaniards are Spanish people of African descent, including North Africa, Sub-Saharan Africa, Afro-Caribbean, Afro-American, and Afro-Latin American descent. The Spanish government does not collect data on ethnicity or racial self-identification. In practice, people originating in North Africa are usually not included in the definition.

== Defining Afro-Spaniards ==
Even though no official census data include racial or ethnic self-identification in Spain, some attempts have been made to quantify the number of Afro-Spaniards. Crossing the data of two official studies, there are at least 1,029,944 Afro-Spaniards, of whom a 47% were born in Spain and a 71% are Spanish nationals.

There are currently 1,301,296 Spanish residents who were born in countries in the African continent, excluding the 1,802,810 born in Ceuta, Melilla, and the Canary Islands, which are Spanish provinces, and, in the case of Ceuta and Melilla, autonomous cities geographically located in Africa.

Out of these, 294,343 are Spanish citizens and 1,006,953 are foreign residents. The large majority of these originate in Morocco. There are 934,046 Moroccan born residents in Spain of which 223,590 are Spaniards and 710,457 are foreign residents. However, Moroccans being North Africans, they are usually not considered as Afro-Spaniards unless they are Black Moroccans, or have visible physical features usually associated with Black peoples. Non-Moroccan African-born residents in Spain thus number 367,250 of which 70,753 are Spanish citizens and 296,497 are foreign residents.

According to the national statistics agency, in 2019 there were 361,000 residents in Spain whose mother was born in an African country excluding Morocco. Out of these 91,000 were Spanish citizens.

== Notable people ==
=== Academics and scientists ===
- Antumi Toasije, historian and activist
- Justo Bolekia Boleka, philologist and writer

=== Artists and writers ===
- Elvira Dyangani, art curator
- Juan Latino, poet and Renaissance humanist
- Bisila Noha, ceramist
- Juan de Pareja, painter of Morisco origin born in Antequera.

=== Explorers and conquistadores ===
- Juan Valiente
- Juan Garrido
- Beatriz de Palacios

=== In entertainment and media ===
- Bella Agossou, actress
- Emilio Buale, actor
- Concha Buika, singer
- Virginia Buika, singer
- Jimmy Castro, actor
- El Chojin, rapper
- Dareysteel, rapper
- Erika Dos Santos, rapper
- Trisha Fernández, actress
- Francine Gálvez, TV presenter
- Hijas del Sol, music duo
- Paloma Loribo, singer and actress
- Desirée Ndjambo, journalist
- Vicenta Ndongo, actress
- Vicente Ndongo, screenwriter
- Nia, singer
- Famous Oberogo, singer
- Athenea Pérez, model
- Berta Vázquez, actress
- Santiago Zannou, filmmaker

=== Philanthropists ===
- Bisila Bokoko

=== Politicians ===
- Rita Bosaho
- Basha Changue
- Luc André Diouf
- Ignacio Garriga
- Dolores Johnson Sastre
- Serigne Mbayé
- Tesh Sidi
- Viviane Ogou

=== In sports ===
- Larry Abia, basketball player
- Malcom Adu Ares, footballer
- Carlos Akapo, footballer
- Sergio Akieme, footballer
- Nely Carla Alberto, handball player
- Glory Alozie, athlete
- Kily Álvarez, footballer
- Ruth Álvarez, footballer
- Jair Amador, footballer
- Marvin Anieboh, footballer
- Godwin Antwi, footballer
- Ismael Athuman, footballer
- Álex Balboa, footballer
- Javier Balboa, footballer
- Alberto Baldé, footballer
- Alejandro Baldé, footballer
- Keita Baldé, footballer
- Mahamadou Baldé, footballer
- Elhadji Bandeh, footballer
- Moussa Bandeh, footballer
- Sergio Barila, football agent and player
- Ibra Barry, footballer
- Thierno Barry, footballer
- Rubén Belima, footballer
- María Bernabéu, judoka
- Jaël Bestué, athlete
- Alemayehu Bezabeh, athlete
- Junior Bita, footballer
- Vanessa Blé, basketball player
- Rodolfo Bodipo, football manager and player
- Jade Boho, footballer
- Adama Boiro, footballer
- Aauri Bokesa, athlete and basketball player
- Iván Bolado, footballer
- Santi Borikó, footballer
- Hugo Buyla, footballer
- Jannick Buyla, footballer
- Alexandrina Cabral, handball player
- Rely Cabral, footballer
- Walter Cabral, basketball player
- Aïcha Cámara, footballer
- Dawda Camara, footballer
- Suleiman Camara, footballer
- Saúl Coco, footballer
- Amilcar Codjovi, footballer
- Milagros Collar, volleyball player
- Alfi Conteh, footballer
- Coba da Costa, footballer
- Juan Cuyami, footballer
- Malcom Dacosta, footballer
- Michael Dacosta, footballer
- Agi Dambelley, footballer
- David Davis, handball player
- James Davis, footballer
- Víctor de Baunbag, footballer
- Bambo Diaby, footballer
- Ousmane Diallo, footballer
- Selu Diallo, footballer
- Thierno Diallo, artistic gymnast
- Fátima Diame, athlete
- Assane Diao, footballer
- Siren Diao, footballer
- Youssouf Diarra, footballer
- Mamadou Diocou, handball player
- Ilimane Diop, basketball player
- Mamadou Diop, basketball player
- Pape Cheikh Diop, footballer
- Álvaro Djaló, footballer
- Marcelo Djaló, footballer
- Jorge Domínguez, footballer
- Dorian Jr., footballer
- Musa Drammeh, footballer
- Cristian Ebea, footballer
- Tessy Ebosele, athlete
- Eddy Silvestre, footballer
- Alberto Edjogo-Owono, footballer
- Juvenal Edjogo Owono, football manager and player
- Noé Ela, footballer
- Ruslan Elá, footballer
- Elijah Gift, footballer
- José Elo, footballer
- Aitor Embela, footballer
- Igor Engonga, footballer
- Óscar Engonga, football manager and player
- Vicente Engonga, football manager and player
- Juan Epitié, footballer
- Rubén Epitié, footballer
- Etienne Eto'o, footballer
- Evuy, footballer
- Samuel Ezeala, rugby player
- Raúl Fabiani, footballer
- Awa Fam, basketball player
- Lamine Fanne, footballer
- Landry Farré, footballer
- Ansu Fati, footballer
- Lamini Fati, footballer
- Paolo Fernandes, footballer
- Francisco Fernández, water polo player
- Pablo Ganet, footballer
- Jastin Garcia, footballer
- Usman Garuba, basketball player
- Kaba Gassama, handball player
- Mamadou Gassama, handball player
- Sekou Gassama, footballer
- Trihas Gebre, athlete
- Ale Gomes, footballer
- Madger Gomes, footballer
- Alassan Gutiérrez, footballer
- Jordan Gutiérrez, footballer
- Sergio Hinestrosa, footballer
- Serge Ibaka, basketball player
- Edna Imade, footballer
- Juliet Itoya, athlete
- Iván Cédric, footballer
- Omar Janneh, footballer
- Joanet, footballer
- John Patrick, footballer
- Joel Johnson, footballer
- Miguel Jones, footballer
- Venancio José, athlete
- Bacari Kambi, footballer
- José Kanté, footballer
- Fatou Kanteh, footballer
- Niko Kata, footballer
- Abdoulaye Keita, footballer
- Kevin Carlos, footballer
- Sulyman Krubally, footballer
- Kuku, footballer
- Lamine Yamal, footballer
- Lauren, footballer
- Cindy Lima, basketball player
- Lionnel Franck, footballer
- Nogaye Lo, basketball player
- Vicky López, footballer
- Gorka Luariz, footballer
- Wellity Lucky, footballer
- Cristian Makaté, footballer
- Roberto Mandje, athlete
- Marta Mangué, handball player
- Àngel Mañana, basketball player
- Nuha Marong, footballer
- Marvel, footballer
- Omar Mascarell, footballer
- Álex Masogo, footballer
- Eliezer Mayenda, footballer
- Frank Mba, basketball player
- Ruslan Mba, footballer
- Sebas Mbansogo, basketball player
- Sayna Mbengue, handball player
- Roni Mbomio, footballer
- Jordi Mboula, footballer
- Carlos Mendes Gomes, footballer
- Claudio Mendes, footballer
- Tomás Mendes, footballer
- Ricky Mendizábal, basketball player
- Luis Meseguer, footballer
- Shalma Midje, footballer
- Josete Miranda, footballer
- Cristopher Moisés, footballer
- Ilaix Moriba, footballer
- Cecilia Muhate, basketball player
- Mujaid, footballer
- Víctor Musa, footballer
- Almike N'Diaye, footballer
- Eli Ndiaye, basketball player
- Thierry Ndikumwenayo, athlete
- Ruth Ndoumbe, athlete
- Astou Ndour, basketball player
- Michael Ngaah, footballer
- Óscar Ngomo, basketball player
- Richard Nguema, basketball player
- Eva Ngui, athlete
- Mamor Niang, footballer
- Junior Nkeng, footballer
- Sama Nomoko, footballer
- Tariku Novales, athlete
- Emilio Nsue, footballer
- John Nwankwo, footballer
- Federico Obama, footballer
- Salomón Obama, footballer
- Esteban Obiang, footballer
- Pedro Obiang, footballer
- Kingseley Obiekwe, basketball player
- Andrea Okene, footballer
- Jean Marie Okutu, athlete
- Helena Oma, basketball player
- Samu Omorodion, footballer
- Charles Ondo, footballer
- Manuel Onwu, footballer
- Josephine Onyia, athlete
- Sydney Osazuwa, footballer
- Derik Osede, footballer
- Great Osobor, basketball player
- David Otorbi, footballer
- Igor Oyono, footballer
- Salma Paralluelo, athlete and footballer
- Marvin Park, footballer
- Ana Peleteiro, athlete
- Lola Pendande, basketball player
- Álex Pérez, footballer
- Jonás Ramalho, footballer
- Moha Ramos, footballer
- Randy, footballer
- Jhafets Reyes, footballer
- Basilio Rieno, footballer
- Víctor Rofino, footballer
- Rui, footballer
- Iván Salvador, footballer
- Buba Sangaré, footballer
- Sitapha Savane, basketball player
- Babacar Seck, karateka
- Sena, footballer
- Seth Airam, footballer
- Óscar Siafá, footballer
- Moró Sidibe, footballer
- Sipo, footballer
- Danila So Delgado, handball player
- Mahamadou Susoho, footballer
- Youba Sissokho, boxer
- Stephen Sunday, footballer
- Mamadou Sylla, footballer
- Taufik Seidu, footballer
- Lysa Tchaptchet, handball player
- Cedric Teguía, footballer
- Roberto Tobe, futsal player
- Mamadou Tounkara, footballer
- Ntji Tounkara, footballer
- Alhagi Touray Sisay, footballer
- Adama Traoré, footballer
- Mohamed Traoré, footballer
- Kareem Tunde, footballer
- Mark Ujakpor, athlete
- Valdo, footballer
- Iñaki Williams, footballer
- Loïc Williams, footballer
- Nico Williams, footballer
- Boison Wynney, footballer
- Lamine Yamal, footballer
- Yago Yao, football manager and player
- Benjamín Zarandona, footballer
- Iván Zarandona, footballer
- Loren Zúñiga, footballer

== See also ==
- African immigration to Europe
- Afro-Hispanic people
- Algerians in Spain
- Equatorial Guinean immigration to Spain
- Fernandino peoples
- Moroccans in Spain
- Racism in Spain
- Spanish Equatoguineans
- Spanish Guinea

== Sources ==
- Appiah, Kwame Anthony; Gates, Henry Louis, Jr.(1999). Africana: the Encyclopedia of African and African American Experience. Basic Civitas Books, pp. 1769–1773. ISBN 0-465-00071-1.
