= Cape Verdean Portuguese =

Variety of Portuguese language

- português cabo-verdiano, português de Cabo Verde
- Native to: Cape Verde
- Native speakers: (undated figure of very few; most Portuguese-speakers in Cape Verde are immigrants)
- Language family: Indo-European: Italic; Latin; Romance; Western Romance; Ibero-Romance; West-Iberian; Galician-Portuguese; Portuguese; Cape Verdean Portuguese

Official status
- Official language in: Cape Verde
- Regulated by: Academia Caboverdiana de Letras

Language codes
- ISO 639-3: –
- Glottolog: None
- IETF: pt-CV

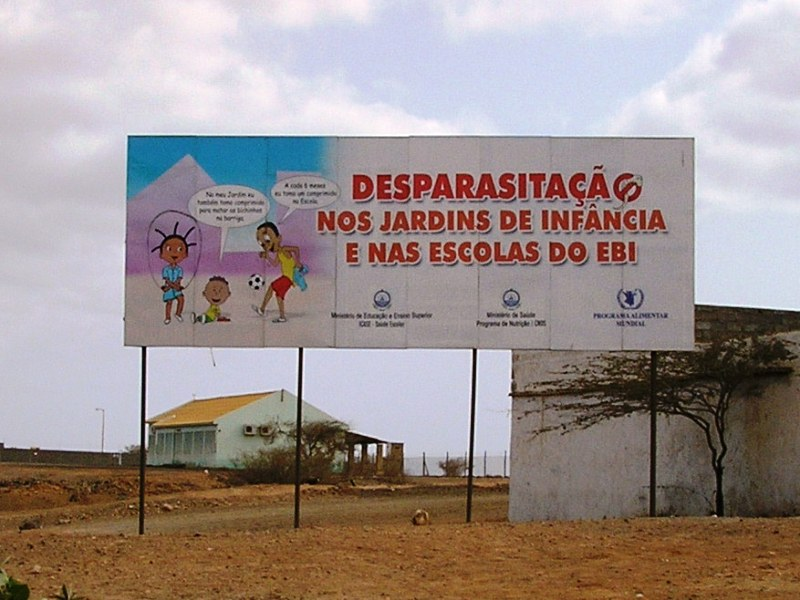
Governmental informational outdoor about deworming in the schools of Sal, in Portuguese. Translates to "Deworming in kindergartens and basic education schools".

Cape Verdean Portuguese (Portuguese: Português cabo-verdiano) is a dialect of Portuguese spoken in Cape Verde.

== Status ==
Portuguese is the official language of Cape Verde, and Cape Verdean Creole is the mother tongue of most of the population. Creole is used colloquially, while Portuguese is used for official conversation, including at schools, and in the media. The two languages coexist in a state of diglossia. Code switching occurs between Creole and standard Portuguese in informal speech.

Although there is no official standardization of the language, models concerning what is standard to Cape Verdean Portuguese include:

1. consensual models among people with more education and/or more exposure to Portuguese;
2. consensual models among scholars, language teachers, etc.

However, when some linguistic phenomena occur in a systematic and regular way, they are no longer considered deviance to the standard, but rather a genuine expression of a regional community.

During Portuguese colonization in Cape Verde, the reference works of the language including dictionaries and school manuals were from Portugal and teaching European Portuguese.

Cape Verdean Portuguese is also spoken in Portugal, Belgium, France, Luxembourg, Switzerland, the United States (especially in Massachusetts), and purportedly, Spain, specifically Catalonia (especially in Barcelona), and Northern Spain, including Galicia (see also: Cape Verdeans in Portugal, Cape Verdeans in Belgium, Cape Verdeans in France, Cape Verdean Luxembourger, Cape Verdean Swiss, Cape Verdean Americans, and Cape Verdean Spanish).

== Characteristics ==
The root language of Cape Verden Portuguese is European Portuguese. However, there are small differences that are enough to set Cape Verdean Portuguese apart from European Portuguese. The versions spoke on the northern and southern islands, despite minor differences in the pronunciation, are similar enough to be considered the same dialect.

=== Phonetics ===
The phonetics of the Cape Verdean Portuguese and European Portuguese are similar. Here are some notable differences:

1. Consonants
  1. /l/
    In Cape Verdean Portuguese /l/ is laminal dental [l̪], pronounced with the tip of the tongue touching the upper teeth. It is similar to the "l" sound in Spanish, French or German.
    The "l" sound in European Portuguese is velarized alveolar [ɫ͇], pronounced with the tip of the tongue touching the alveolar ridge, well behind the upper teeth, with the tongue making a curve with the concavity pointing up, and the back of the tongue approaching the vellum. It is similar to the /l/ in English and Catalan.
  2. /ʁ/
    /ʁ/ has the same variability as in European Portuguese. It is either pronounced as an alveolar trill [r] (more frequent in the Southern Islands) or either as an uvular trill [ʀ], voiced uvular fricative [ʁ] or voiced velar fricative [ɣ] (more frequent in the Northern Islands).
  3. Intervocalic /b/, /d/ and /ɡ/
    In Portugal, are realized as the fricatives [β], [ð] and [ɣ]. In Cape Verde they are always pronounced as plosives [b], [d] and [ɡ].
2. Vowels and diphthongs
  1. Unstressed open vowels
    In European Portuguese there are cases when the unstressed ⟨a⟩ is pronounced open [a]:
    - when it originates etymologically from ⟨aa⟩ (sadio, Tavares, caveira, etc.);
    - when a final ⟨a⟩ is followed by an initial ⟨a⟩ (minha amiga, casa amarela, uma antena, etc.);
    - when the ⟨a⟩ is followed by a preconsonantal /l/ (alguém, faltou, etc.);
    - other cases harder to explain (camião, racismo, etc.)
    In Cape Verdean Portuguese there is the tendency to realize these as close [ɐ]:
    - vadio, caveira, minha amiga, uma antena, alguém, faltou, are all pronounced with [ɐ];
    Note that in the educated register some instances of the unstressed ⟨a⟩ are pronounced open [a]: baptismo, fracção, actor.
  2. Unstressed initial ⟨o⟩
    In Cape Verde, the unstressed initial ⟨o⟩ is always pronounced close [o].
  3. Unstressed initial ⟨e⟩
    In Portugal the written unstressed initial ⟨e⟩ is pronounced [i]. In Cape Verde, according to the word (and the speaker) it's either pronounced [e] or [i]. Probably, the natural tendency is to pronounce [e] (in a parallel way to the initial "o") being the pronunciation [i] resulting from European Portuguese pressure. Many Cape Verdean speakers clearly distinguish in the pronunciation certain word pairs: eminência \ iminência, emita \ imita, emigrante \ imigrante, elegível \ ilegível, emergir \ imergir, etc.
  4. Unstressed initial "e" before "s" + consonant
    In Portugal the unstressed initial "e" before "s" + consonant is pronounced [ɨ]. In Cape Verde, this "e" is not pronounced at all, beginning the word by a voiceless palatal fricative [ʃ] (estado, espátula, esquadro) or by a voiced palatal fricative [ʒ] (esbelto, esganar).
  5. /ɨ/
    Some Cape Verdean speakers haves some trouble pronouncing the unstressed ⟨e⟩ sound, pronounced [ɨ] in European Portuguese (revelar, medir, debate). This trouble is solved in two different ways:
    1. speakers from the Southern Islands pronounce it as [i];
    2. speakers from the Northern Islands delete it (check point 7 farther below);
      Nevertheless, an epenthetic /ɨ/ is never inserted after final /l/ and /ɾ/, as it is the case for some speakers in Portugal. Thus, in Cape Verde, normal, barril, cantar, beber are never pronounced normale, barrile, cantare, bebere.
  6. Unstressed /i/ and /u/
    In Cape Verde there is no dissimilation of two /i/ or /u/ as happens in Portugal. Words like medicina, vizinho are actually pronounced me-di-ssi-, vi-zi- and not me-de-ssi-, ve-zi- like in Portugal. Words like futuro, Sofia are actually pronounced fu-tu-, su-fi- and not fe-tu-, Se-fi- like in Portugal.
  7. Unstressed [i], [ɨ], [u]
    Speakers from the Northern Islands frequently delete these vowels.
    Nevertheless, either what is mentioned in this point as what was mentioned on point 5 are considered pronunciation errors by Cape Verdeans themselves.
  8. Diphthongs
    In standard European Portuguese the orthographical sequence "ei" is pronounced [ɐj], while the sequence "ou" is pronounced [o]. In Cape Verde these diphthongs are pronounced as the writing suggests: ⟨ei⟩ is pronounced [ej], while ⟨ou⟩ is pronounced [ow].
    In the same way, the sequence ⟨em⟩ is pronounced [ẽj], and not [ɐ̃j] like in standard European Portuguese.
  9. Stressed "e" before palatal sounds
    In the same way as the previous point, the stressed "e" before the palatals /ʎ, ɲ, ʃ, ʒ/) is pronounced [e] and not [ɐ] like in standard European Portuguese.
  10. The sequence ⟨ui⟩
    The sequence ⟨ui⟩ in the word muito is pronounced as an oral diphthong [uj], rather than a nasalized diphthong [ũj].

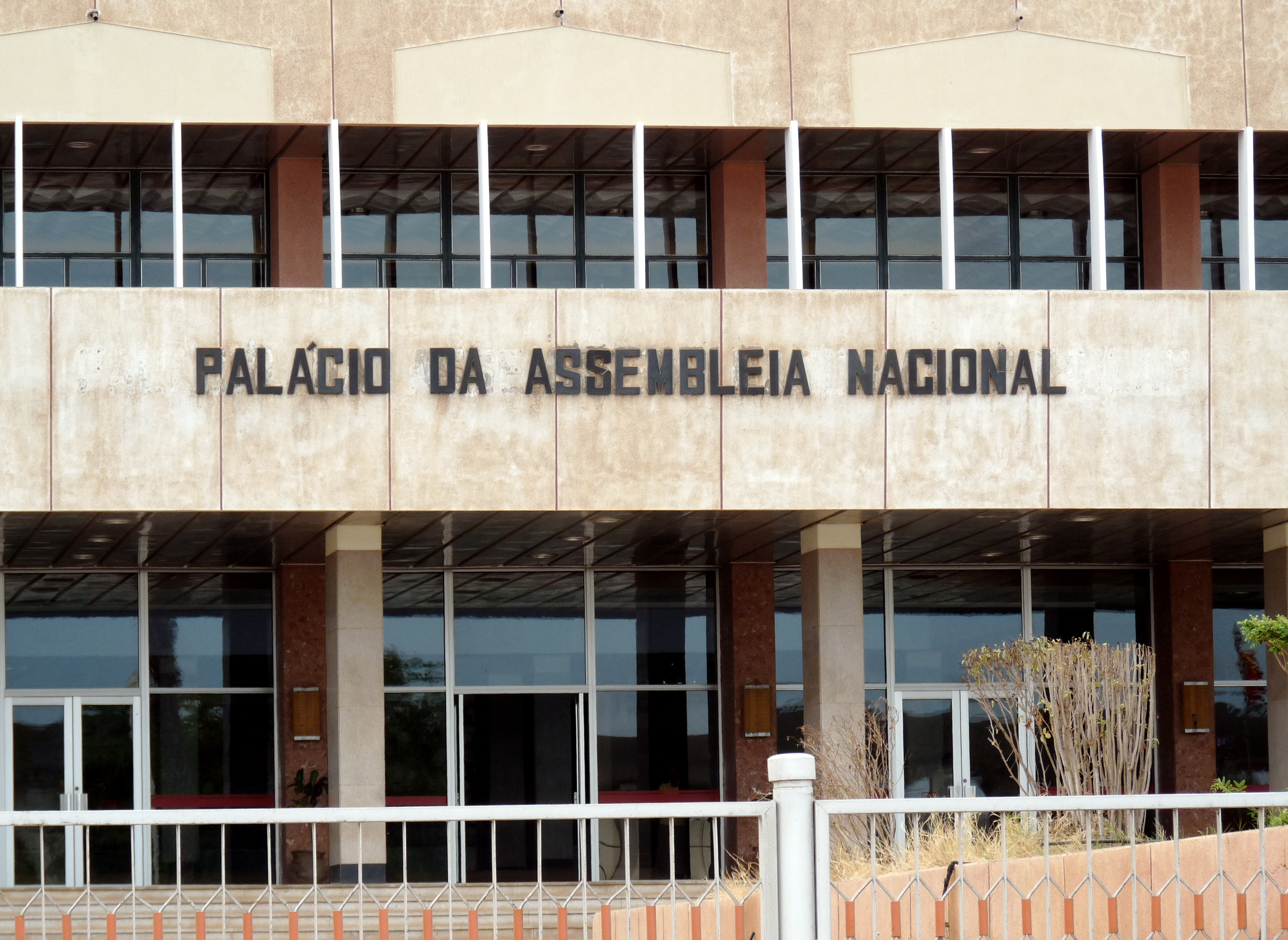
Cape Verdean National Assembly building, in Praia

=== Morphology and syntax ===
Morphological differences between European Portuguese and Cape Verdean Portuguese are slight, but they do exist. Some Creole syntax structures have been transposed to Cape Verdean Portuguese.

1. In Portugal there are several ways for the 2nd person treatment expressed by tu "you (familiar)", você "you (respectful)", o senhor "sir", a senhora "madam", Sr. Dr. "Doctor" (or any other professional title), calling the person by name but using the 3rd person (e.g., O Manuel fazia-me isso, por favor? "Manuel would do this for me, please"), etc. Each of these corresponds to several levels of formality.
  The treatment for the 2nd person in Cape Verde is simpler, with only two levels: tu "you" (intimacy, familiar or same age treatment) and você "you" (respectful treatment) that can be used indistinguishably from o senhor "sir" or a senhora "madam".
2. In Creole there is no specific form for the future tense. The future in Creole is expressed with the auxiliary verb "to go". That is likely why Cape Verdeans prefer using a composite form for the future in Portuguese instead of a simple form (eu vou fazer "I am going to do instead of eu farei "I will do").
  The same happens with the conditional (se chovesse eu não ia sair "if it rained I was not going to leave" instead of se chovesse eu não sairia "if it rained I wouldn't leave").
3. Frequent usage of the interrogative in the negative form, especially when someone offers something: Não queres uma xícara de café? "Don't you want a cup of coffee?"; Não precisas da minha ajuda? "Don't you need my help?".
4. In Creole there are no definite articles, and the same is occasionally true in Cape Verdean Portuguese. Ex.: Pedro foi instead of O Pedro foi "Pedro went").
5. The first person of the past plural in verbs from the first conjugation is not pronounced with an open [a] (even if the orthography requests that!). Cantámos, louvámos, brincámos pronounced with closed [ɐ].
6. Since there is no verbal inflection in Creole, the usage of personal pronouns is mandatory. That is likely the reason why in Cape Verdean Portuguese the omission of the personal pronouns is rare. Ex.: Eu desço as escadas more frequently than Desço as escadas "I go down the stairs".
7. Also because the inflection of words in Creole is weak, the word order is more rigid. Creole does not allow the flexibility, inversions, and word order changes that Portuguese allows.
  In everyday usage, it is not natural to a Cape Verdean speaker, when speaking Portuguese, to use inversions and word order changes. For example, what in Portugal could be said espero eu que um dia lá chegues (literally "hope I that one day there you arrive"), to a Cape Verdean speaker would be more natural to say eu espero que tu chegues lá um dia (literally "I hope that you arrive there one day").
  Nevertheless, it is not an impeachment to, at literary level, use the flexibility mentioned before.
8. Some frequent mistakes in Portugal, such as póssamos (instead of possamos), tu fizestes (instead of tu fizeste), tu hades fazer (instead of tu hás de fazer), dei-te a ti (instead of dei-te) are not registered in Cape Verde.

=== Lexicon and Semantics ===
In the lexicon and semantics there are strong influences from Creole. A line between a Creole substratum in Cape Verdean Portuguese and a Creole superstratum in Cape Verdean Portuguese can be unclear. Since nearly all the words in Creole originate from Portuguese, the usage of certain forms is not clear if they are Portuguese archaisms that have remained in Cape Verdean Portuguese, or if they are Creole words that were introduced in Portuguese.

In some other cases, even when speaking Portuguese, a Creole word would be used instead of the corresponding Portuguese one.

1. Some words are specific and reveal some particularities of Cape Verdean fauna, flora, cuisine, or climate.
  1. azedinha (gooseberry) instead of groselha;
  2. babosa (aloe vera) instead of aloe vera;
  3. bandeja (platter) instead of tabuleiro;
  4. beijo (meringue) instead of suspiro;
  5. calabaceira (baobab) instead of embondeiro;
  6. carambola (marbles) instead of berlinde;
  7. fatia parida (french toast) instead of rabanada;
  8. gaita (accordion) instead of acordeão;
  9. geada (dew) instead of orvalho;
  10. malagueta (chilli pepper) instead ofpiri-piri, but the word malagueta is also used in the Portuguese-speaking world;
  11. mancarra (peanut) instead of amendoim;
  12. mel understood as sugarcane honey; the bee honey is known as mel de abelha;
  13. passarinha (kingfisher) instead of martim-pescador;
  14. tambarina (tamarind) instead of tamarindo;
  15. tchota (sparrow) instead of pardal;
  16. violão (guitar) same usage in Brazil, but different in Portugal (viola);
2. Other objects, ideas or expressions are expressed differently. For Example:
  1. one picks up the phone saying alô, and not estou or está as in Portugal, but the same in Brazil;
  2. what in Portugal is called indiscriminately mala, in Cape Verde has several denominations accordingly to the object: mala "suitcase", pasta "briefcase", carteira "purse", saco de senhora "handbag", arca "trunk", etc.;
  3. What in Portugal is called a sobretudo "overcoat", casaco "coat", blusão "jersey", kispo "anorak", blazer, in Cape Verde is simply called casaco;
  4. máquina de calcular is used (and not calculadora "calculator"), máquina de fotocópias (and not fotocopiadora "Xerox machine"), cartucho de tinta (and not tinteiro "ink cartridge");
3. Because the closer neighboring countries of Cape Verde are francophones, in diplomatic environment or in environments more in contact with foreigners some neologisms appear. These are strongly rejected by scholars and purists in Cape Verde. For ex.: engajar (from French engager), atitude revanchista (from French revanche), adereço meaning "address" (is it from French adresse or from English "address"?). However, the fact that in Creole is pronounced "tchanci" makes one believe that the usage of the word chance (in Cape Verdean Portuguese) is an Anglicism (English "chance"), and not a Gallicism (French chance);
4. In spite of some words being used with exactly the same meaning of European Portuguese, they are also used with the meaning in Creole. Ex.:
  1. malcriado, rebel, unsubmissive, instead of rude;
  2. afronta, desperation, instead of outrage;
  3. pudera!, exclamation meaning "of course!"
  4. rocha, mountain, instead of rock
  5. inocente, naïf, instead of innocent;
5. Some meanings in Portugal are simply not known in Cape Verde. Ex.:
  1. abalar is only known with the meaning of "to shake", and not with the meaning of "to leave";
  2. ilhéu is only known with the meaning of "islet", and not with the meaning of "island inhabitant";
  3. ténis is only used for the sport "tennis", the shoes "sneakers" are known as sapatilhas (a meaning mostly only employed in the Lisbon region and the south of Portugal);

=== Orthography ===
Cape Verde has participated in the elaboration of the Acordo Ortográfico — with a delegation composed of the linguist Manuel Veiga and by the writer Moacyr Rodrigues; and has ratified the document. In 1998 Cape Verde was the host of the II CPLP Summit, held in Praia, where the first "Protocolo Modificativo ao Accordo Ortográfico da Língua Portuguesa" was signed, which removed from the original text the original date of enforcement (1994). Cape Verde has ratified this document, as well as the "Segundo Protocolo Modificativo" (April 2005), being the second country (after Brazil) to complete the entire procedure for the enforcement of the Spelling Agreement.

According to Prime Minister José Maria Neves, Cape Verde is in favor of a "spell approach" between the existing variants in Portugal and Brazil and sees Portuguese as "an important tool for the development of Cape Verde". Despite the Spelling Agreement 1990 having become effective on October 1, 2015, in the country the rules of Spelling Agreement of 1945 continues to prevail.

== See also ==
- Guinean Portuguese
- Papiamento
- São Tomean Portuguese
- Portuguese language in Africa
- ECOWAS
- RTC (Cape Verde)
