= Equatorial Guinea–Spain relations =

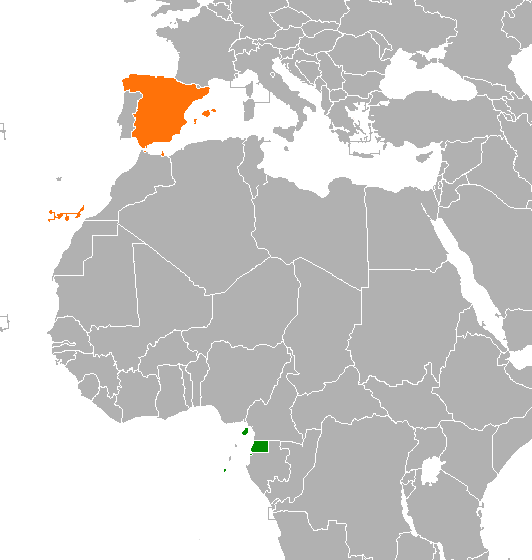
- Equatorial Guinea: Spain

Equatorial Guinea–Spain relations are the diplomatic relations between Equatorial Guinea and Spain. Both nations are members of the Association of Academies of the Spanish Language, Organization of Ibero-American States and the United Nations.

== History ==
=== Spanish colonization ===
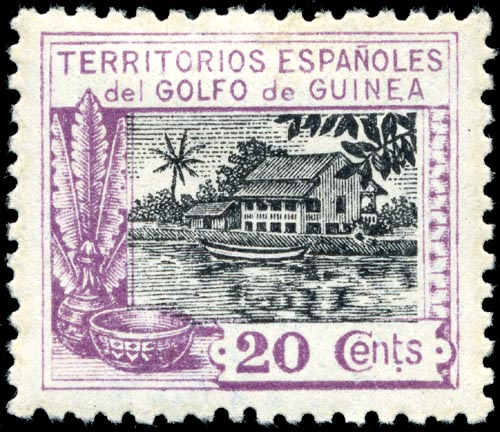
Stamp from Spanish Guinea

The first Europeans to explore the island of Fernando Po and Annobón were the Portuguese who arrived in 1472. In 1778, Portugal ceded the territory to Spain after the signing of the Treaty of El Pardo. These cessions were made so that Spain would have access to slaves for Spanish America and at the same time, it recognized the rights of the Portuguese west of the 50° W meridian in present-day Brazil. Spain controlled its new territory, called Spanish Guinea, from its Viceroyalty of the Río de la Plata based in Buenos Aires. By 1781, Spain withdrew from the territory after many of the Spanish settlers and soldiers were decimated by yellow fever.

In 1827, Spain leased the island of Fernando Po to the British Royal Navy who required a base to watch for slavers after they abolished the slave trade in 1807. By 1844, Spain took control of its territory and began to use it as a penal settlement for Cubans. After the Spanish–American War, the territory of Spanish Guinea was the last significant territory of Spain. After the Spanish Civil War, in 1959, Spanish Guinea was reorganized into two provinces of overseas Spain and placed under civil governors and the residents of Spanish Guinea were given full Spanish citizenship. By 1963, Spanish Guinea was given some economic and administrative autonomy.

=== Independence ===
In the 1960s, there was a movement for the decolonisation of Africa. In 1967, residents of Spanish Guinea began demanding independence. In early 1968, the Spanish government suspended autonomous political control over the territory and proposed a national referendum over a new constitution. The constitution was approved on 11 August by Spanish Guinean residents and on 12 October 1968, Spanish Guinea declared its independence and changed its name to Equatorial Guinea. Spain immediately recognized the new nation and established diplomatic relations. That same year, Francisco Macías Nguema became the first President of the newly independent nation. By 1969, all Spanish troops and most of the Spanish community left the country for Spain.

=== Post Independence ===
In March 1977, Spain suspended diplomatic relations with Equatorial Guinea due to repression by President Nguema and his verbal attacks against the Spanish government. In October 1978, relations between both nations dipped to an all-time low when President Nguema, who took absolute power in the country, began to send entire families and villages to their execution or to migrant camps. Spain was prepared to send troops to the nation to intervene and evacuate its citizens if they were particularly targeted by President Nguema. In August 1979, a coup d'état was led by Lieutenant Teodoro Obiang Nguema Mbasogo, the nephew of President Nguema, who was captured by opposition forces and executed. That same month, Lieutenant Obiang formerly asked the Spanish government for military assistance, however, it was refused, though Spain did extend diplomatic recognition to his government. Obiang became the second President of Equatorial Guinea.

Between 1979 and 1983, Spain sent Equatorial Guinea 15 million Spanish pesetas for the development of the nation. Relations between both nations almost severed again due to debt renegotiation in 1983 and the fact that Equatorial Guinea owed Spain over 6 million Spanish pesetas. Agreements were made before more drastic measures were taken. During the 2004 coup d'état attempt, President Obiang accused Spain of knowing about the coup attempt and for sending two Spanish warships to the region, however, Spanish Prime Minister José María Aznar denied the allegations that the ships were there to assist in the coup.

== High-level visits ==
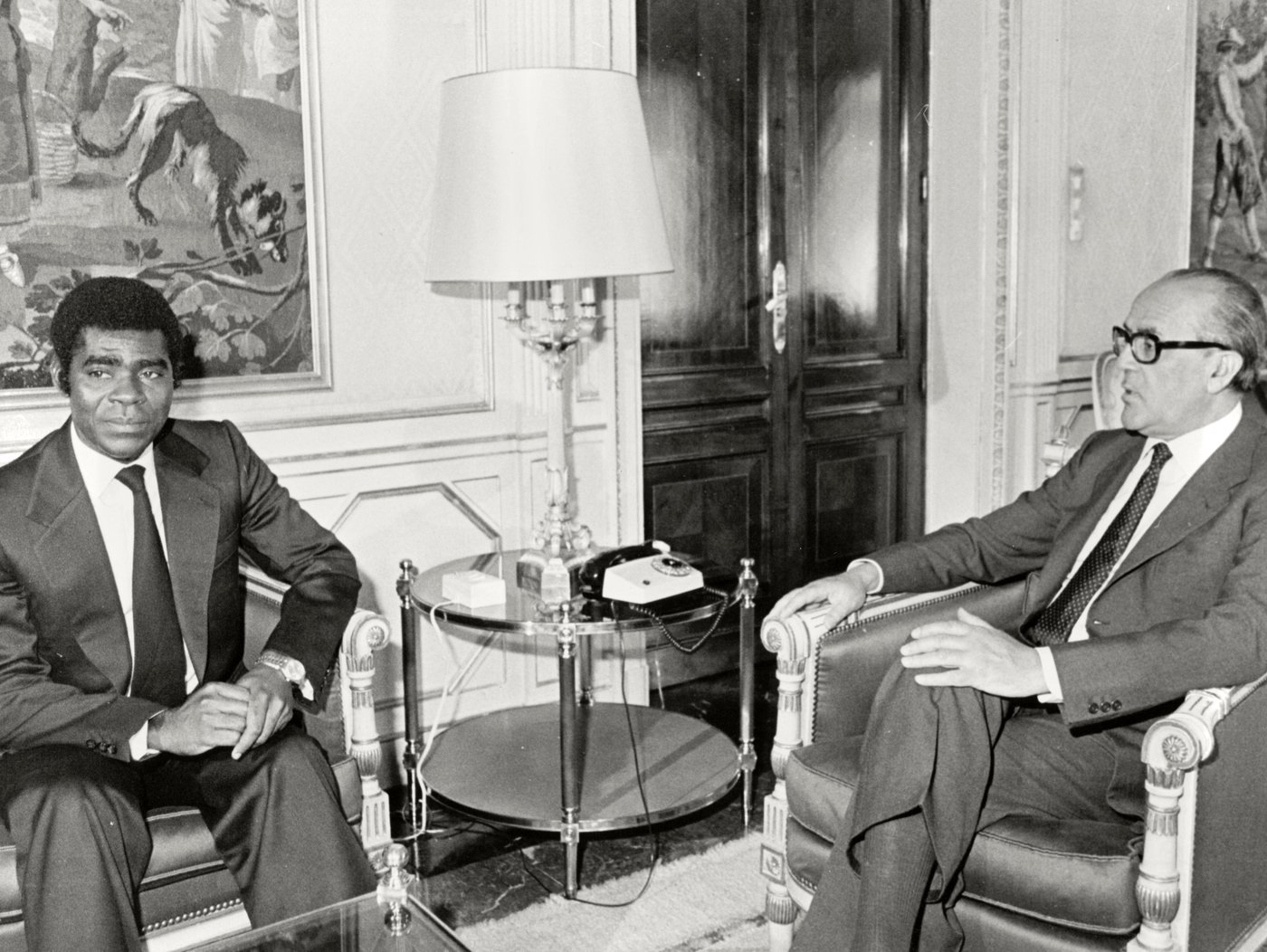
Equatoguinean President Teodoro Obiang Nguema Mbasogo and Spanish Prime Minister Leopoldo Calvo-Sotelo in Madrid; 1982.

Presidential visits from Equatorial Guinea to Spain

- President Teodoro Obiang Nguema Mbasogo (1980, 1982, 2001, 2006, 2014)

Royal and Prime Ministerial visits from Spain to Equatorial Guinea

- King Juan Carlos I (1979, 1980)
- Prime Minister Felipe González (1991)
- Prime Minister Mariano Rajoy (2014)

== Agreements ==
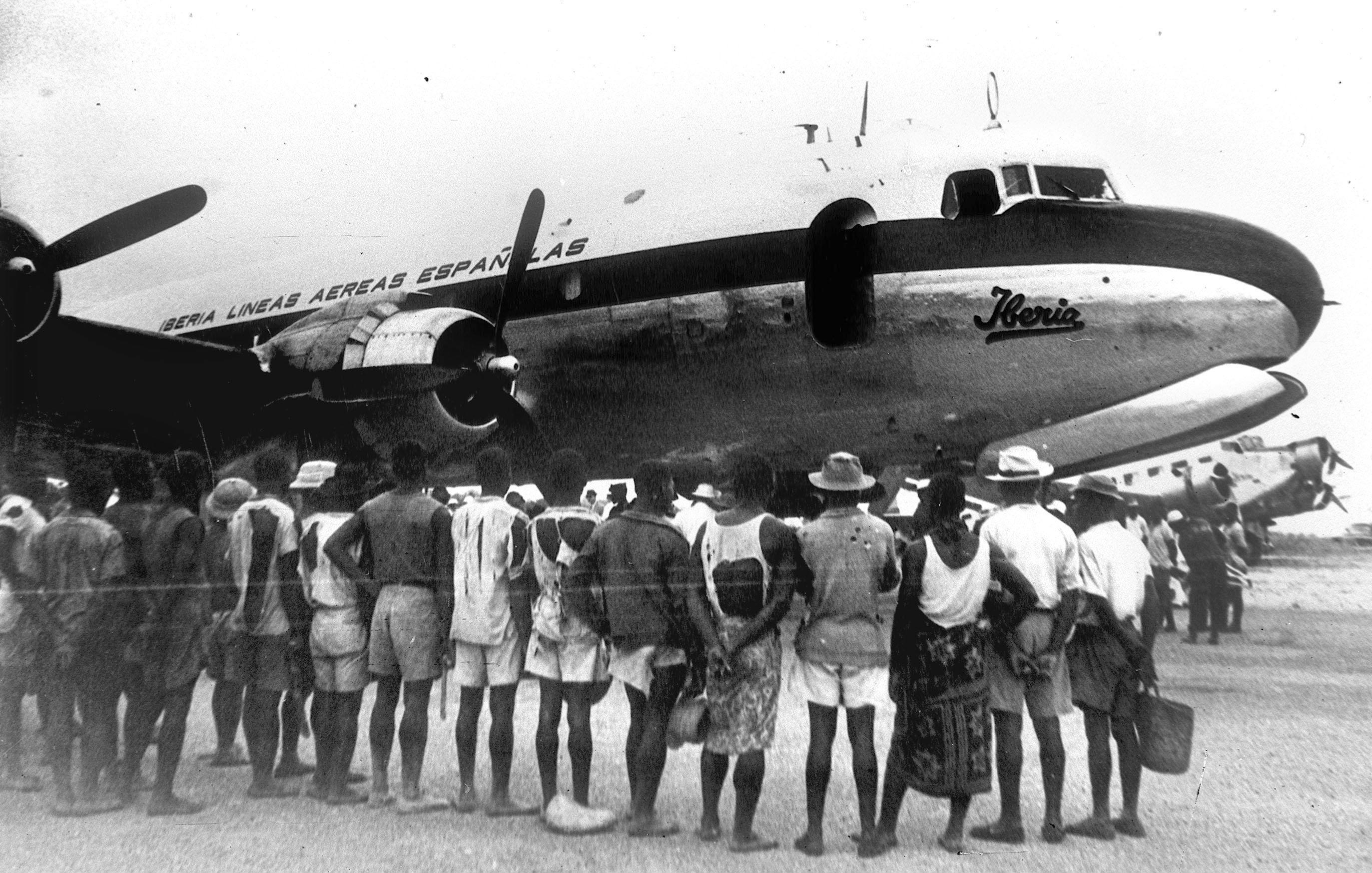
Inaugural flight with Iberia from Madrid to Bata, 1941

Over the years, both nations have signed numerous agreements such as an Agreement on Cultural Cooperation (1969); Technical and Agricultural Cooperation Agreement (1979); Education Agreement (1980); Friendship and Cooperation Treaty (1980); Agreement on the Promotion and Protection of Investments (2003) and a Transportation Agreement (2012).

== Transport ==
There are direct flight between Malabo and Madrid with CEIBA Intercontinental and Iberia airlines.

== Trade ==
In 2024, trade between Equatorial Guinea and Spain totaled $848 million dollars. 90% of Equatorial Guinea's exports to Spain is in oil. Spain's main exports to Equatorial Guinea include: drinks, furniture and lamps, mechanical equipment, automobiles and trucks, and electronic material. Spain's has €3 million Euros of investment in Equatorial Guinea, mainly in the construction industry. At the same time, Equatorial Guinea's investment in Spain total €4 million Euros. Equatorial Guinea is Spain's ninth biggest trading partner from Africa (78th largest globally). Spain is Equatorial Guinea's third biggest trading partner globally (after China and the United States).

== Resident diplomatic missions ==
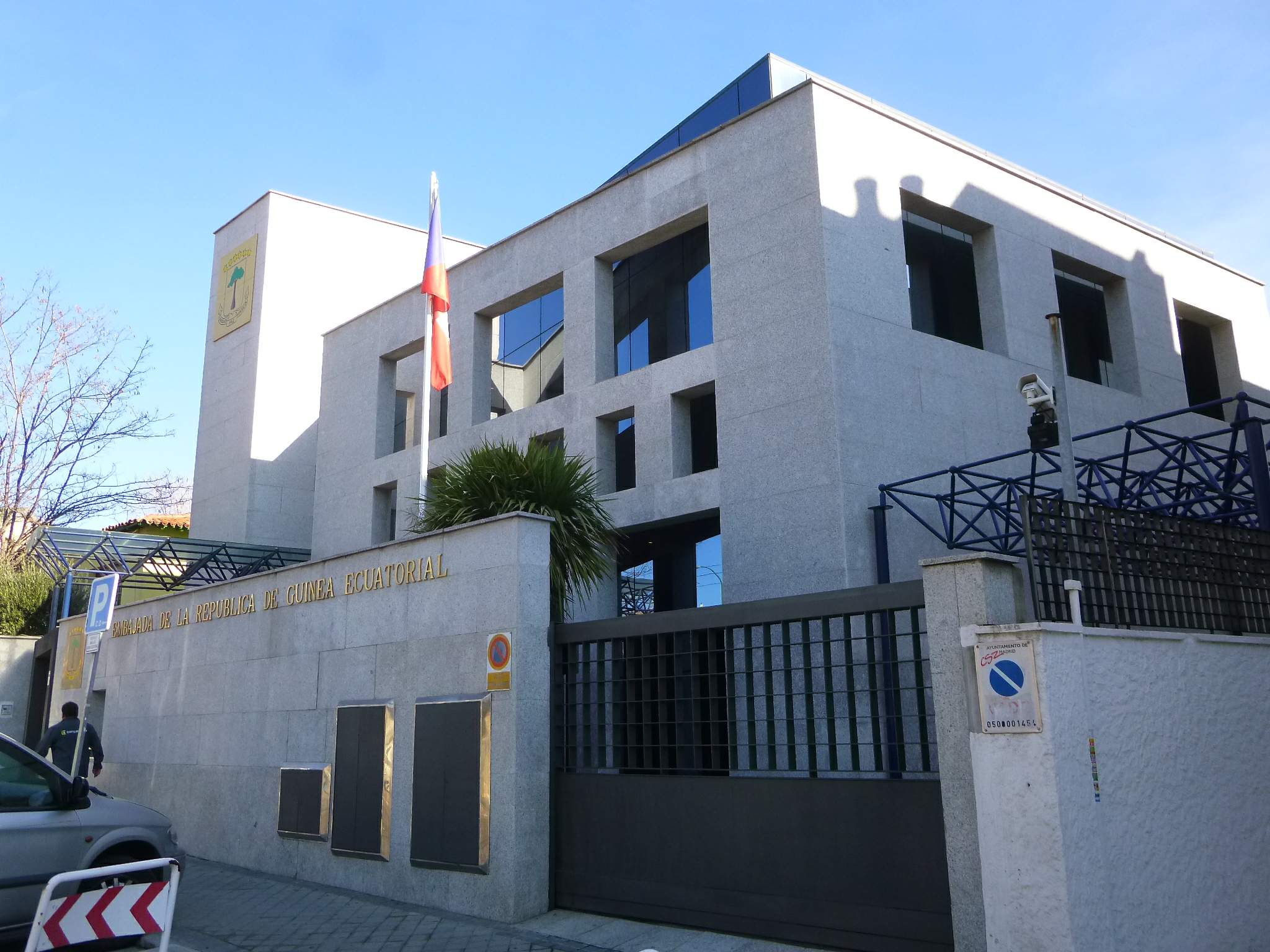
Embassy of Equatorial Guinea in Madrid

- Equatorial Guinea has an embassy in Madrid and a consulate in Las Palmas.
- Spain has an embassy in Malabo and a consulate-general in Bata.

== See also ==
- Foreign relations of Equatorial Guinea
- Foreign relations of Spain
- Spanish immigration to Equatorial Guinea
