= Antumi Toasijé =

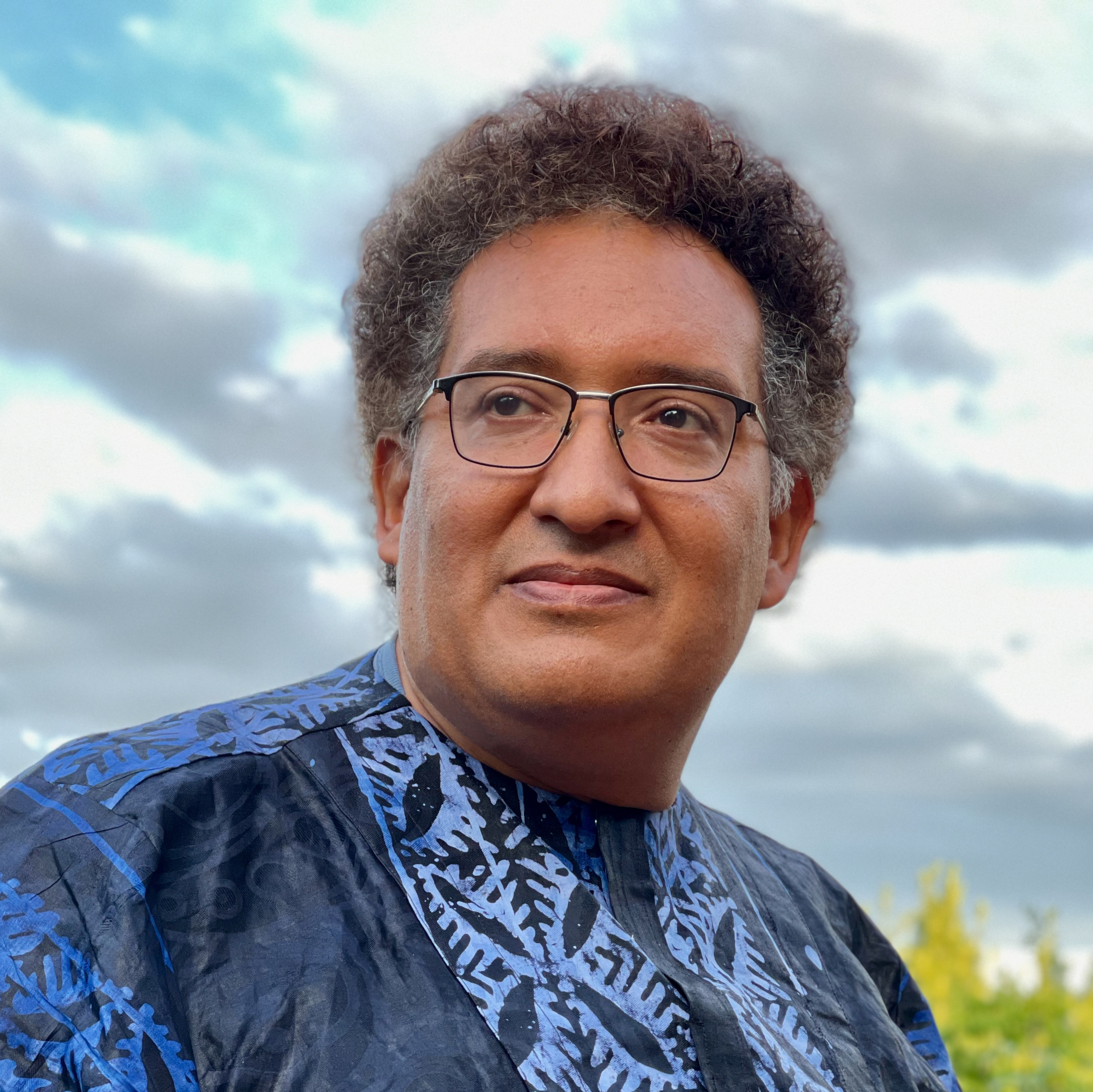
- Born: Antumi Pallas; 13 November 1969 (age 56); Bogotá, Colombia
- Occupation: Historian

Antumi Pallas (born 13 November 1969), also known as Antumi Toasijé, is a Spanish-Colombian historian and advocate for Pan-Africanism of about half African descent (Afro-Spaniard). A Global History lecturer at the University of New York in Madrid as well as professor in other universities in Spain, he is a specialist in African History and culture, the African presence in Spain, racism, and Pan-African political philosophy. He is also the president of the Council for the Elimination of Racial or Ethnic Discrimination (CEDRE), a consultative body of the Spanish Ministry of Equality.

== Biography ==
Antumi Toasijé was born on 13 November 1969 in Bogotá to Laura Victoria Valencia Rentería, an Afro-Colombian woman from Quibdó whose African roots are in the Temne people from Sierra Leone, and a Spanish father exiled from the francoist regime. He is closely affiliated with Equatorial Guinea and Ghana, but lives and works primarily in Spain where he moved at the age of two. Toasijé identifies spiritually as a Buddhist.

Antumi Toasijé earned his PhD from the University of Alcala in Spain in History, culture and thought, with a Thesis on the black presence in Spain from the Iron Age to present times Previously he studied at the University of the Balearic Islands and obtained the title of Licentiate in history before starting his doctorate degree from the Autonomous University of Madrid. He has been the director of the Center for Pan-African Studies, president of the Pan-African Center, director of the Journal of Migrations of the Federation of Balearic Immigrant Associations, and has been a member of the Group of African Studies at the Autonomous University of Madrid.

Toasijé lived his early years in Ibiza in the Balearic Islands where he took up painting and poetry. He was a member of the poetic group Desfauste and participated actively in the cultural life of the island. In 2003, together with a group of African intellectuals, he founded the Association of African and Pan-African Studies, whose journal Nsibidi was the first Spanish-language journal of African social studies. In 2005 he directed the scientific committee of the 2nd Pan-African Congress in Spain under the auspices of the National University of Distance Education. Later he became involved with the Spaniard slavery reparations movement, culminating on 17 February 2009 with the passage of a non-binding motion on the matter by the Congress of Deputies. Toasijé is a recognized figure of afrocentricity and Pan Africanism in the Spanish Speaking world. Currently, he is part of the civil society working team of facilitators of the African Union 6th Region in charge of Spain and the Spanish Speaking Countries. Also Antumi Toasijé is the prime impetus behind the New Universal Calendar (NUCAL) movement.

In October 2020 Antumi Toasije is appointed by the Spanish Ministry of Equality Irene Montero as President of the Council for the Elimination of Racial or Ethnic Discrimination (CEDRE), a consultative body of the Spanish Ministry of Equality. He has been awarded with a Fulbright Scholar in Residence as from August 2024 at Morgan State University, Baltimore, Maryland.

Toasijé has been lecturing and conferencing in various Spanish Universities and institutions, he is the coauthor of various books about immigration and African themes, and has written extensively both in the academic and the popular press. He works closely with other Spanish-speaking Pan-Africanists such as Mbuyi Kabunda Badi and Justo Bolekia Boleká.

== Books ==
- Si me preguntáis por el Panafricanismo y la Afrocentricidad (2013)
- La noche inabarcable Novel (2019)
- Africanidad (2020)

== Academic papers ==
- Mujer africano norteamericana decimonónica: imagen, discurso y actitudes liberadoras. (2006)
- The Africanity of Spain Identity and Problematization. (2007)
- La esclavitud en el XVI en territorios hispánicos. (2008 Published in 2010)
- Autoafirmación y naturalidad en las literaturas africanas clásicas de resistencia de la mano de Edward Said. (2008)
- Desarrollismos Despistes y Auto-Realización Africana. En torno a Amartya Sen y M. Molineux. (2010)
- La memoria y el reconocimiento de la comunidad africana y africano-descendiente negra en España: El papel de la vanguardia panafricanista. (2010)
- El cine de África negra: la mirada moral.(2010)

== See also ==
- Afro-Colombians
- Afro-Spaniards
- Pan-Africanism
