= Spaniards =

Españoles (Note: Native names and pronunciations: Spanish: españoles [espaˈɲoles]; Astur-Leonese: españoles (Extremaduran pronunciation: [ɛhpːaˈɲɔlɪh], Leonese pronunciation: [espaˈɲoles, -lɪs]); Basque: espainiarrak [espaɲiarak] or espainolak [espaɲiolak]; Aragonese: espanyols [espaˈɲols]; Catalan: espanyols (Eastern Catalan pronunciation: [əspəˈɲɔls], Valencian pronunciation: [espaˈɲɔls]); Galician: españois [espaˈɲɔjs, -ˈɲɔjʃ]; Occitan: espanhòls [espaˈɲɔls].)

Total population
- Spain nationals: 42,327,164 (for a total population of 49,570,725) Hundreds of millions in the Americas of full or partial Spanish ancestry Nationals abroad: 3,202,002 which of them: 860,957 were born in Spain; 1,943,347 were born in the country of residence 393,390 others

Regions with significant populations
- Spain 42,327,164 (85.4%)

Diaspora
- Argentina: 404,111 (92,610 born in Spain)
- France: 350,136 (262,153 born in Spain)
- United States: 192,766 (48,546 born in Spain)
- Germany: 182,631 (61,881 born in Spain)
- United Kingdom: 181,181 (2020) (including de jure Spanish citizens that were not born in Spain)
- Venezuela: 136,145 (30,167 born in Spain)
- Brazil: 117,523 (29,848 born in Spain)
- Cuba: 108,858 (2,114 born in Spain)
- Mexico: 108,314 (17,485 born in Spain)
- Switzerland: 103,247 (46,947 born in Spain)
- Uruguay: 63,827 (12,023 born in Spain)
- Chile: 56,104 (9,669 born in Spain)
- Belgium: 53,212 (26,616 born in Spain)
- Peru: 40,300 (14,028 born in Spain)
- Ecuador: 35,616 (13,120 born in Spain)
- Colombia: 30,683 (8,057 born in Spain)
- Andorra: 24,485 (17,771 born in Spain)
- Netherlands: 21,974 (12,406 born in Spain)
- Italy: 20,898 (11,734 born in Spain)
- Dominican Republic: 18,928 (3,622 born in Spain)
- Australia: 18,353 (10,506 born in Spain)
- Costa Rica: 16,482
- Sweden: 15,390
- Panama: 12,375
- Morocco: 12,300
- United Arab Emirates: 12,000
- Senegal: 10,000
- Guatemala: 9,311
- Ireland: 6,794
- Poland: 5,000
- Japan: 3,380
- Philippines: 3,110
- Honduras: ~ 1,000 (2009)
- El Salvador: 2,450
- Russia: 2,118–45,935
- Nicaragua: 1,826
- Greece: 1,489
- Turkey: 1,441
- Czech Republic: 1,007

Languages
- Spanish (see languages)

Religion
- Predominantly Catholic Christianity; Minority Irreligion

Spaniards, or Spanish people, are an ethnic group and nation indigenous to Spain. Genetically and ethnolinguistically, Spaniards belong to the broader Southern and Western European populations, exhibiting a high degree of continuity with other Indo-European-derived ethnic groups in the region. Spain is also home to a diverse array of national and regional identities, shaped by its complex history. These include various languages and dialects, many of which are direct descendants of Latin, the language imposed during Roman rule. Among them, Castilian is the most widely spoken and the only official language across the entire country.

Commonly spoken regional languages include, most notably, the sole surviving indigenous language of Iberia, Basque, as well as other Latin-descended Romance languages like Spanish itself, Catalan and Galician. Many populations outside Spain have ancestors who emigrated from Spain and share elements of Hispanic cultures. The most notable of these comprise Hispanic America.

The Roman Republic conquered Iberia during the 2nd and 1st centuries BC. Hispania, the name given to Iberia by the Romans as a province of the Empire, underwent a process of linguistic and cultural Romanization, and as such, the majority of local languages in Spain today, with the exception of Basque, evolved out of Vulgar Latin which was introduced by the ancient Romans. At the end of the Western Roman Empire, the Germanic tribal confederations migrated from Central Europe, invaded the Iberian Peninsula and established relatively independent realms in its western provinces, including the Suebi, Alans, and Vandals. Eventually, the Visigoths would forcibly integrate all remaining independent territories in the peninsula, including the Byzantine province of Spania, into the Visigothic Kingdom, which more or less unified politically, ecclesiastically, and legally all the former Roman provinces or successor kingdoms of what was then documented as Hispania.

In the early eighth century, the Visigothic Kingdom was conquered by the Umayyad Islamic Caliphate that arrived to the peninsula in the year 711. The Muslim rule in the Iberian Peninsula, termed al-Andalus, soon became autonomous from Baghdad. The handful of small Christian pockets in the north left out of Muslim rule, along the presence of the Carolingian Empire near the Pyrenean range, would eventually lead to the emergence of the Christian kingdoms of León, Castile, Aragon, Portugal, and Navarre. Along seven centuries, an intermittent southwards expansion of the latter kingdoms (known in historiography as the Reconquista) took place, culminating with the Christian seizure of the last Muslim polity (the Nasrid Kingdom of Granada) in 1492, the same year Christopher Columbus arrived in the New World. During the centuries after the Reconquista, the Christian kings of Spain persecuted and expelled ethnic and religious minorities such as Jews and Muslims through the Spanish Inquisition.

A process of political conglomeration among the Christian kingdoms also ensued, and the late 15th-century saw the dynastic union of Castile and Aragon under the Catholic Monarchs, generally considered the point of emergence of Spain as a unified country. The Conquest of Navarre occurred in 1512. There was also a period called Iberian Union, the dynastic union of the Kingdom of Portugal and the Spanish Crown; during which, both countries were ruled by the Spanish Habsburg kings between 1580 and 1640.

In the early modern period, Spain had one of the largest empires in history, which was also one of the first global empires, leaving a large cultural and linguistic legacy that includes over 570 million Hispanophones, making Spanish the world's second-most spoken native language, after Mandarin Chinese. During the Golden Age there were also many advancements in the arts, with the rise of renowned painters such as Diego Velázquez. The most famous Spanish literary work, Don Quixote, was also published during the Golden Age of the Spanish Empire.

The population of Spain has become more diverse due to immigration of the late 20th and early 21st centuries. From 2000 to 2010, Spain had among the highest per capita immigration rates in the world and the second-highest absolute net migration in the world (after the United States). The diverse regional and cultural populations mainly include the Castilians, Aragonese, Catalans, Andalusians, Valencians, Balearics, Canarians, Basques, and Galicians (among others).

== History ==
=== Early populations ===
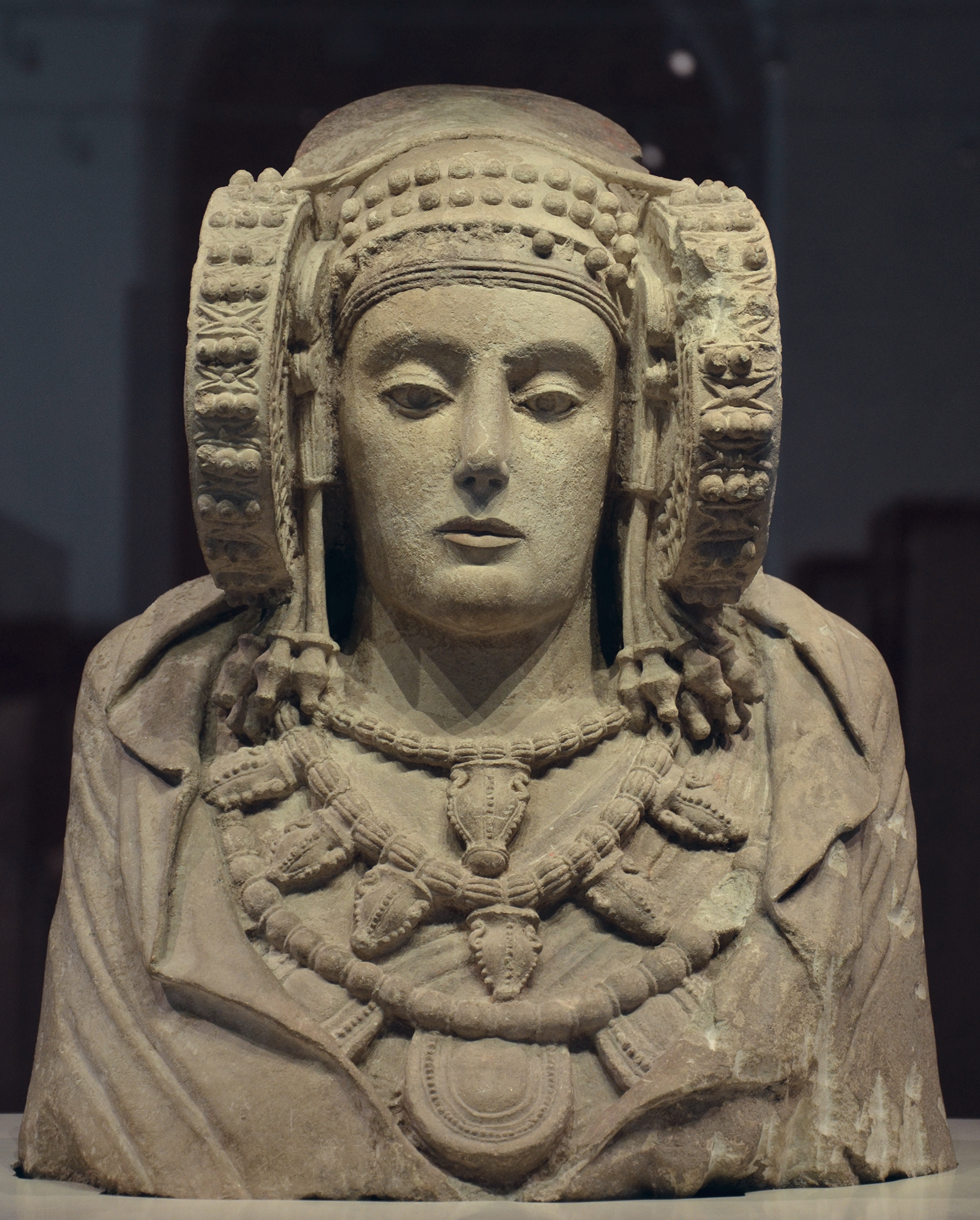
Lady of Elche, a piece of Iberian sculpture from the 4th century BC

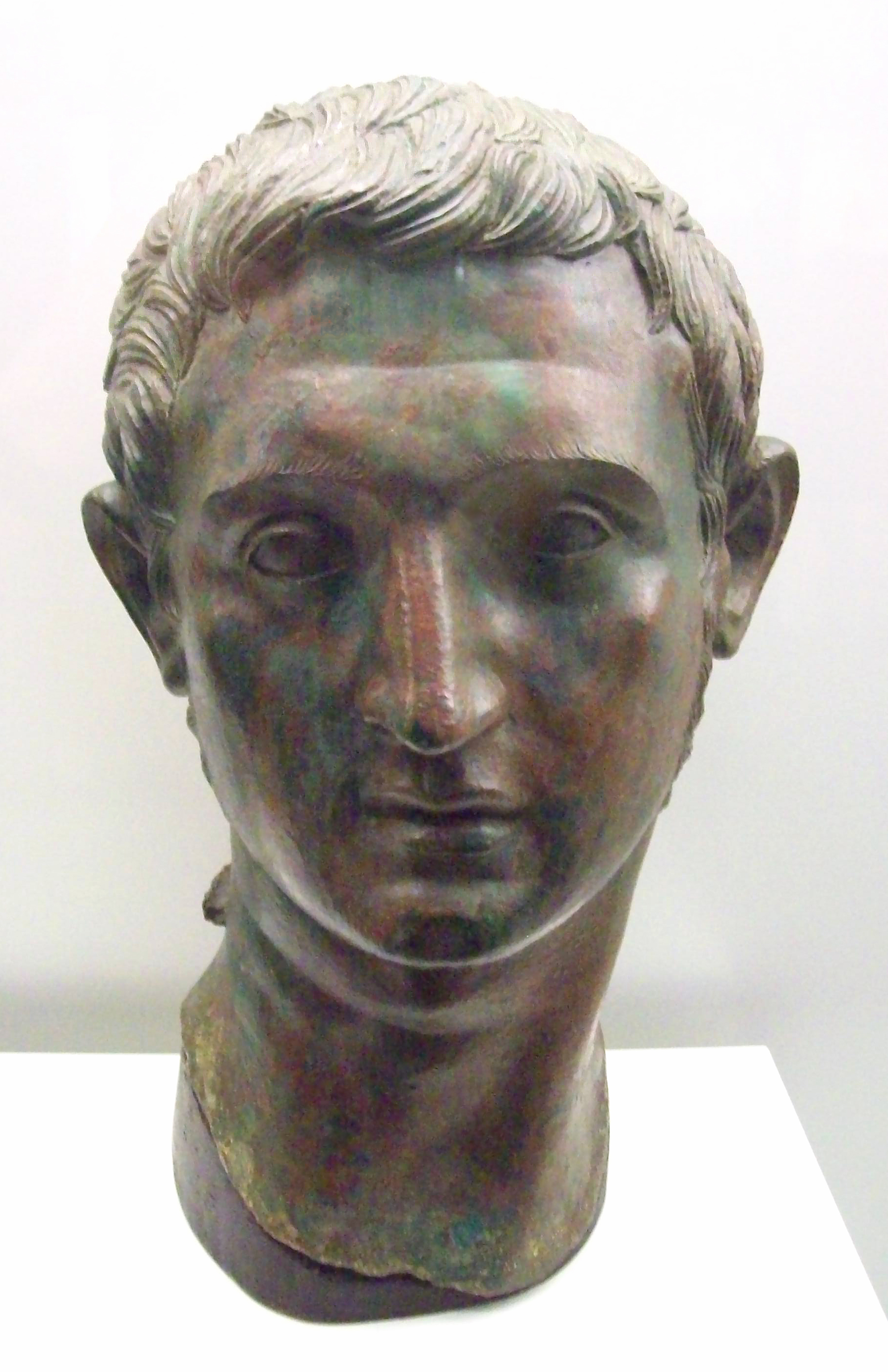
A young Hispano-Roman nobleman from the 1st century BC

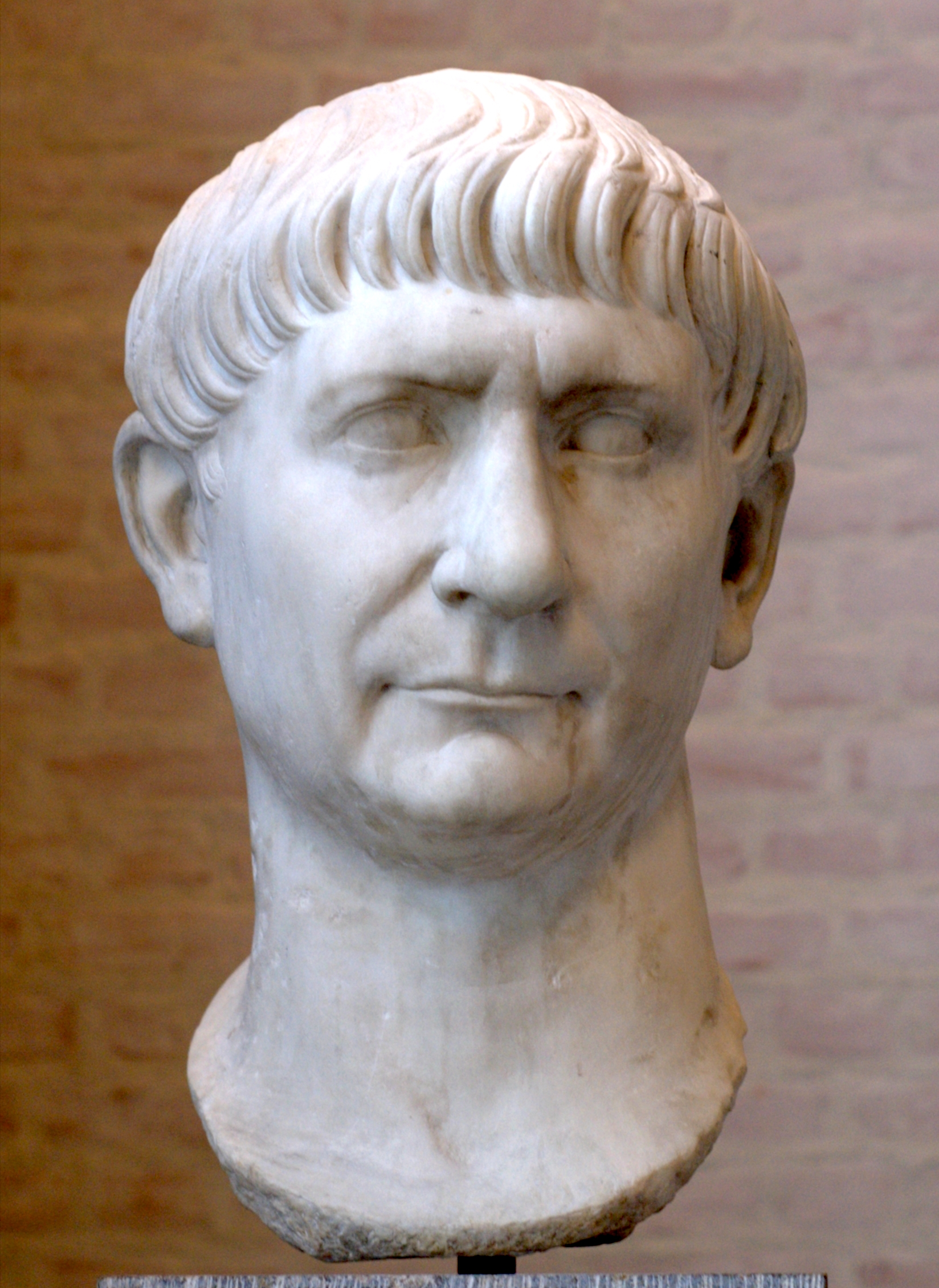
Marble bust of Roman Emperor Trajan, born in Roman Hispania (in Italica near modern-day Seville)

The earliest modern humans inhabiting the region of Spain are believed to have been Paleolithic peoples, who may have arrived in the Iberian Peninsula as early as 35,000–40,000 years ago. The Iberians are believed to have arrived or emerged in the region as a culture between the 4th millennium BC and the 3rd millennium BC, settling initially along the Mediterranean coast.

Then Celts settled in Spain during the Iron Age. Some of those tribes in north-central Spain, who had cultural contact with the Iberians, are called Celtiberians. In addition, a group known as the Tartessians and later Turdetanians inhabited southwestern Spain. They are believed to have developed a separate culture influenced by Phoenicia. The seafaring Phoenicians, Greeks, and Carthaginians successively settled trading colonies along the Mediterranean coast over a period of several centuries. Interaction took place with Indigenous peoples. The Second Punic War between the Carthaginians and Romans was fought mainly in what is now Spain and Portugal.

The Roman Republic conquered Iberia during the 2nd and 1st centuries BC, and established a series of Latin-speaking provinces in the region. As a result of Roman colonization, the majority of local languages, with the exception of Basque, stem from the Vulgar Latin that was spoken in Hispania (Roman Iberia). A new group of Romance languages of the Iberian Peninsula including Spanish, which eventually became the main language in Spain evolved from Roman expansion. Hispania emerged as an important part of the Roman Empire and produced notable historical figures such as Trajan, Hadrian, Seneca, Martial, Theodosius, and Quintilian.

The Germanic Vandals and Suebi, with Iranian Alans under King Respendial, arrived in the peninsula in 409 AD. Part of the Vandals with the remaining Alans, now under Geiseric, removed to North Africa after a few conflicts with another Germanic tribe, the Visigoths. The latter were established in Toulouse and supported Roman campaigns against the Vandals and Alans in 415–19 AD.

The Visigoths became the dominant power in Iberia and reigned for three centuries. They were highly romanized in the eastern Empire and already Christians, so they became fully integrated into the late Iberian-Roman culture.

The Suebi were another Germanic tribe in the west of the peninsula; some sources said that they became established as federates of the Roman Empire in the old Northwestern Roman province of Gallaecia (roughly, present-day northern Portugal and Galicia). But they were largely independent and raided neighboring provinces to expand their political control over ever-larger portions of the southwest after the Vandals and Alans left. They created a totally independent Suebic Kingdom. In 447 AD they converted to Roman Catholicism under King Rechila.

After being checked and reduced in 456 AD by the Visigoths, the Suebic Kingdom survived to 585 AD. It was decimated as an independent political unit by the Visigoths, after having been involved in the internal affairs of their kingdom.

=== Middle Ages ===
After two centuries of domination by the Visigothic Kingdom, the Iberian Peninsula was invaded by a Muslim force under Tariq Bin Ziyad in 711. This army consisted mainly of ethnic Berbers from the Ghomara tribe, who were reinforced by Arabs from Syria once the conquest was complete. Only a remote mountainous area in the far north retained independence, eventually developing as the Christian Kingdom of Asturias.

Muslim Iberia became part of the Umayyad Caliphate and would be known as Al-Andalus. The Berbers of Al Andalus revolted as early as 740 AD, halting Arab expansion across the Pyrenee Mountains into France. Upon the collapse of the Umayyad in Damascus, Spain was seized by Yusuf al Fihri. The exiled Umayyad Prince Abd al-Rahman I next seized power, establishing himself as Emir of Cordoba. Abd al Rahman III, his grandson, proclaimed a Caliphate in 929, marking the beginning of the Golden Age of Al Andalus. This policy was the effective power of Iberia and the Maghreb; it competed with the Shiite rulers of Tunis and frequently raided the small Christian kingdoms in the North.

The Caliphate of Córdoba effectively collapsed during a ruinous civil war between 1009 and 1013; it was not finally abolished until 1031, when Al-Andalus broke into a number of mostly independent mini-states and principalities called taifas. These were generally too weak to defend themselves against repeated raids and demands for tribute from the Christian states to the north and west, which were known to the Muslims as "the Galician nations". These had expanded from their initial strongholds in Galicia, Asturias, Cantabria, the Basque country, and the Carolingian Marca Hispanica to become the Kingdoms of Navarre, León, Portugal, Castile and Aragon, and the County of Barcelona. Eventually they began to conquer territory, and the Taifa kings asked for help from the Almoravids, Muslim Berber rulers of the Maghreb. But the Almoravids went on to conquer and annex all the Taifa kingdoms.

In 1086 the Almoravid ruler of Morocco, Yusuf ibn Tashfin, was invited by the Muslim princes in Iberia to defend them against Alfonso VI, King of Castile and León. In that year, Tashfin crossed the straits to Algeciras and inflicted defeat on the Christian army at the Battle of Sagrajas. By 1094, Yusuf ibn Tashfin had removed all Muslim princes in Iberia and had annexed their states, except for the one at Zaragoza. He also regained Valencia from the Christians. About this time a massive process of conversion to Islam took place, and Muslims comprised the majority of the population in Spain by the end of the 11th century.

The Almoravids were succeeded by the Almohads, another Berber dynasty, after the victory of Abu Yusuf Ya'qub al-Mansur over the Castilian Alfonso VIII at the Battle of Alarcos in 1195. In 1212 a coalition of Christian kings under the leadership of the Castilian Alfonso VIII defeated the Almohads at the Battle of Las Navas de Tolosa. But the Almohads continued to rule Al-Andalus for another decade, though with much reduced power and prestige. The civil wars following the death of Abu Ya'qub Yusuf II rapidly led to the re-establishment of taifas. The taifas, newly independent but weakened, were quickly conquered by the kingdoms of Portugal, Castile, and Aragon. After the fall of Murcia (1243) and the Algarve (1249), only the Emirate of Granada survived as a Muslim state, tributary of Castile until 1492.

Iberian Kingdoms in 1400

In 1469 the marriage of Ferdinand of Aragon and Isabella of Castile signaled a joining of forces to attack and conquer the Emirate of Granada. The King and Queen convinced the Pope to declare their war a crusade. The Christians were successful and finally, in January 1492, after a long siege, the Moorish sultan Muhammad XI surrendered the fortress palace, the renowned Alhambra.

Spain conquered the Canary Islands between 1402 and 1496. Their indigenous Berber population, the Guanches, were gradually absorbed by intermarrying with Spanish settlers.

Spanish conquest of the Iberian part of Navarre was begun by Ferdinand II of Aragon and completed by Charles V. The series of military campaigns extended from 1512 to 1524, while the war lasted until 1528 in the Navarre to the north of the Pyrenees. Between 1568 and 1571, Charles V armies fought and defeated a general insurrection of the Muslims of the mountains of Granada. Charles V then ordered the expulsion of up to 80,000 people from Granada and their dispersal throughout Spain.

The union of the Christian kingdoms of Castile and Aragon as well as the conquest of Granada, Navarre and the Canary Islands led to the formation of the Spanish state as known today. This allowed for the development of a Spanish identity based on the Spanish language and a local form of Catholicism. This gradually developed in a territory that remained culturally, linguistically and religiously very diverse.

A majority of Jews were forcibly converted to Catholicism during the 14th and 15th centuries and those remaining were expelled from Spain in 1492. The open practice of Islam by Spain's significant Mudejar population was similarly outlawed. Furthermore, between 1609 and 1614, hundreds of thousands of Moriscos— (Muslims who had been baptized Catholic) were expelled by royal decree. Although initial estimates of the number of Moriscos expelled such as those of Henri Lapeyre reach 300,000 Moriscos (or 4 percent of the total Spanish population), the extent and severity of the initial expulsions have been challenged by some modern historians. Nevertheless, the eastern region of Valencia, where ethnic tensions were highest, was particularly affected by the expulsion, suffering economic collapse and depopulation of much of its territory.

Spain's Islamic legacy has endured, and among many others, accounts for two of the eight masterpieces of Islamic architecture from around the world: the Alhambra of Granada and the Cordoba Mosque; the Palmeral of Elche is listed as a World Heritage Site due to its uniqueness.

Those who avoided expulsion or who managed to return to Spain merged into the dominant culture. The last mass prosecution against Moriscos for crypto-Islamic practices took place in Granada in 1727, with most of those convicted receiving relatively light sentences. By the end of the 18th century, Indigenous Islam and Morisco identity were considered to have been extinguished in Spain.

=== Colonialism and emigration ===
Spanish and Portuguese empires in 1790

In the 16th century, following the military conquest of most of the new continent, perhaps 240,000 Spaniards entered American ports. They were joined by 450,000 in the next century. It is estimated that during the colonial period (1492–1832), a total of 1.86 million Spaniards settled in the Americas and a further 3.5 million immigrated during the post-colonial era (1850–1950); the estimate is 250,000 in the 16th century, and most during the 18th century as immigration was encouraged by the new Bourbon Dynasty. After the conquest of Mexico and Peru these two regions became the principal destinations of Spanish colonial settlers in the 16th century. In the period 1850–1950, 3.5 million Spanish left for the Americas, particularly Argentina, Uruguay, Mexico, Brazil, Chile, Venezuela, and Cuba. From 1840 to 1890, as many as 40,000 Canary Islanders emigrated to Venezuela. 94,000 Spaniards chose to go to Algeria in the last years of the 19th century, and 250,000 Spaniards lived in Morocco at the beginning of the 20th century.

By the end of the Spanish Civil War, some 500,000 Spanish Republican refugees had crossed the border into France. From 1961 to 1974, at the height of the guest worker in Western Europe, about 100,000 Spaniards emigrated each year. Spain has formally apologized to expelled Jews, and, since 2015, the State offers the opportunity to reclaim Spanish citizenship. By 2019, over 132,000 Sephardic Jewish descendants had reclaimed Spanish citizenship.

The population of Spain has become more diverse due to immigration of the late 20th and early 21st centuries. From 2000 to 2010, Spain had among the highest per capita immigration rates in the world and the second-highest absolute net migration in the world (after the United States). Immigrants now make up about 10% of the population. But Spain's prolonged economic crisis between 2008 and 2015 reduced economic opportunities, and both immigration rates and the total number of foreigners in the country declined. By the end of this period, Spain was becoming a net emigrant country.

== Ancestry ==
=== Historical origins and genetics ===
Spanish people, like most Europeans, largely descend from three distinct lineages: Mesolithic hunter-gatherers, descended from populations associated with the Paleolithic Epigravettian culture; Neolithic Early European Farmers who migrated from Anatolia during the Neolithic Revolution 9,000 years ago; and Yamnaya Steppe herders who expanded into Europe from the Pontic–Caspian steppe of Ukraine and southern Russia in the context of Indo-European migrations 5,000 years ago.

Ethnology of the Iberian Peninsula c. 300 BC

The Spanish people's genetic pool largely derives from the pre-Roman inhabitants of the Iberian Peninsula:

- Pre-Indo-European and Indo-European speaking pre-Celtic groups: (Iberians, Vettones, Turdetani, Aquitani).
- Celts (Gallaecians, Celtiberians, Turduli, and Celtici), who were Romanized after the conquest of the region by the ancient Romans.

There are also some genetic influences from Germanic tribes who arrived after the Roman period, including the Suebi, Hasdingi Vandals, Alans, and Visigoths. Due to its position on the Mediterranean Sea, like other Southern European countries, the territories of what is now Spain also had contact with such other Mediterranean peoples as the ancient Phoenicians, Greeks, Carthaginians, and Jews, as well as Mediterranean Berbers and Arabs, who arrived during Al-Andalus, all leaving some North African and Sephardic Jewish genetic contributions, particularly in the southern and western Iberian Peninsula.

== Peoples of Spain ==
=== Nationalities and regions ===
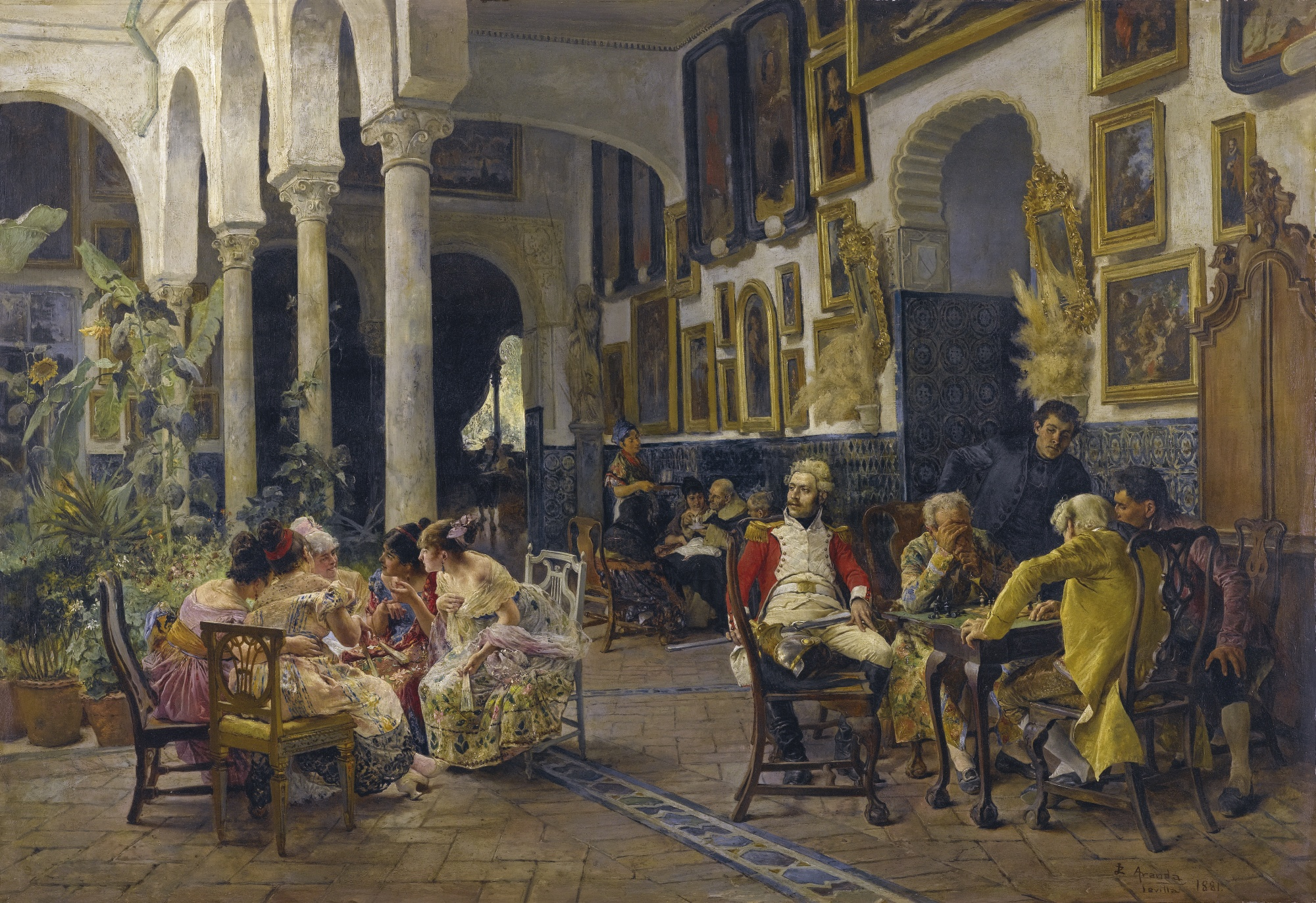
Conversation in a Sevillian Courtyard, 19th century by José Jiménez Aranda

Within Spain, there are various nationalities and regional populations including the Andalusians, Castilians, Catalans, Valencians and Balearics (who speak Catalan, a distinct Romance language in eastern Spain), the Basques (who live in the Basque country and north of Navarre and speak Basque, a non-Indo-European language), and the Galicians (who speak Galician, a descendant of old Galician-Portuguese).

Respect to the existing cultural pluralism is important to many Spaniards. In many regions there exist strong regional identities such as Asturias, Aragon, the Canary Islands, León, and Andalusia, while in others (like Catalonia, Basque Country or Galicia) there are stronger national sentiments. Many of them refuse to identify themselves with the Spanish ethnic group and prefer some of the following:

Nationalities and regional identities

- Andalusian people
- Aragonese people
- Asturian people
- Balearic people
- Basque people
- Canary Islanders
- Cantabrian people
- Castilian people
- Catalan people
- Extremaduran people
- Galician people
- Leonese people
- Valencian people

=== Romani minority ===
Spain is home to one of the largest communities of Romani people (commonly known by the English exonym "gypsies", Spanish: gitanos). The Spanish Roma, which belong to the Iberian Kale subgroup (calé), are a formerly-nomadic community, which spread across Western Asia, North Africa, and Europe, first reaching Spain in the 15th century.

Data on ethnicity is not collected in Spain, although the Government's statistical agency CIS estimated in 2007 that the number of Gitanos present in Spain is probably around one million. Most Spanish Roma live in the autonomous community of Andalusia, where they have traditionally enjoyed a higher degree of integration than in the rest of the country. A number of Spanish Calé also live in Southern France, especially in the region of Perpignan.

=== Modern immigration ===
Due to recent immigration, the population of Spain has become increasingly diverse. From 2000 to 2010, Spain had among the world's highest per capita immigration rates and the second highest absolute net migration in the world (after the United States); immigrants now make up about 10% of the population. Since 2000, Spain has absorbed more than three million immigrants, with thousands arriving each year. In 2008, Spain's immigrant population topped 4.5 million. These immigrants came mainly from Europe, Central America, South America, Asia, North Africa, and West Africa.

== Languages ==
The vernacular languages of Spain (simplified): Spanish official; spoken all over the country; Catalan, co-official; Basque, co-official; Galician, co-official; Occitan (Aranese), co-official; Asturian (and Leonese), recognised but not official; Aragonese, recognised but not official

Languages spoken in Spain include Spanish (castellano or español) (74%), Catalan (català, called valencià, in the Valencian Community) (17%), Galician (galego) (7%), and Basque (euskara) (2%). Other languages with a lower level of official recognition are Asturian (asturianu), Aranese Gascon (aranés), Aragonese (aragonés), and Leonese, each with their own various dialects. Spanish is the official state language, although the other languages are co-official in a number of autonomous communities.

Peninsular Spanish is typically classified in northern and southern dialects; among the southern ones Andalusian Spanish is particularly important. The Canary Islands have a distinct dialect of Spanish which is close to Caribbean Spanish. The Spanish language is a Romance language and is one of the aspects (including laws and general "ways of life") that causes Spaniards to be labelled a Romanic people. Spanish has a significant Arabic influence in vocabulary; between the 8th and 12th centuries, Arabic was the dominant language in Al-Andalus and some 4,000 words are of Arabic origin, including nouns, verbs and adjectives. It also has influences from other Romance languages such as French, Italian, Catalan, Galician or Portuguese. Traditionally, the Basque language has been considered a key influence on Spanish, though nowadays this is questioned. Other changes are borrowings from English and other Germanic languages, although English influence is stronger in the Americas than in Spain.

The number of speakers of Spanish as a mother tongue is roughly 35.6 million, while the vast majority of other groups in Spain such as the Galicians, Catalans, and Basques also speak Spanish as a first or second language, which boosts the number of Spanish speakers to the overwhelming majority of Spain's population of 46 million.

Spanish was exported to the Americas due to over three centuries of Spanish colonial rule starting with the arrival of Christopher Columbus to Santo Domingo in 1492. Spanish is spoken natively by over 400 million people and spans across most countries of the Americas; from the Southwestern United States in North America down to Tierra del Fuego, the southernmost region of South America in Chile and Argentina. A variety of the language, known as Judaeo-Spanish or Ladino (or Haketia in Morocco), is still spoken by descendants of Sephardic Jews who fled Spain and Portugal following a decree of expulsion of practising Jews in 1492. Also, a Spanish creole language known as Chabacano, which developed by the mixing of Spanish and native Tagalog and Cebuano languages during Spain's rule of the country through Mexico from 1565 to 1898, is spoken in the Philippines (by roughly 1 million people).

== Religion ==
Roman Catholicism is by far the largest denomination present in Spain, although its share of the population has been decreasing for decades. According to a study by the Spanish Centre for Sociological Research in 2013 about 71% of Spaniards self-identified as Catholics, 2% other faith, and about 25% identified as atheists or declared they had no religion. Survey data for 2019 show Catholics down to 69%, 2.8% "other faith" and 27% atheist-agnostic-non-believers.

== Emigration from Spain ==
Distribution of the Spaniards and their descendants around the world. Spain + 100,000 + 10,000 + 1,000

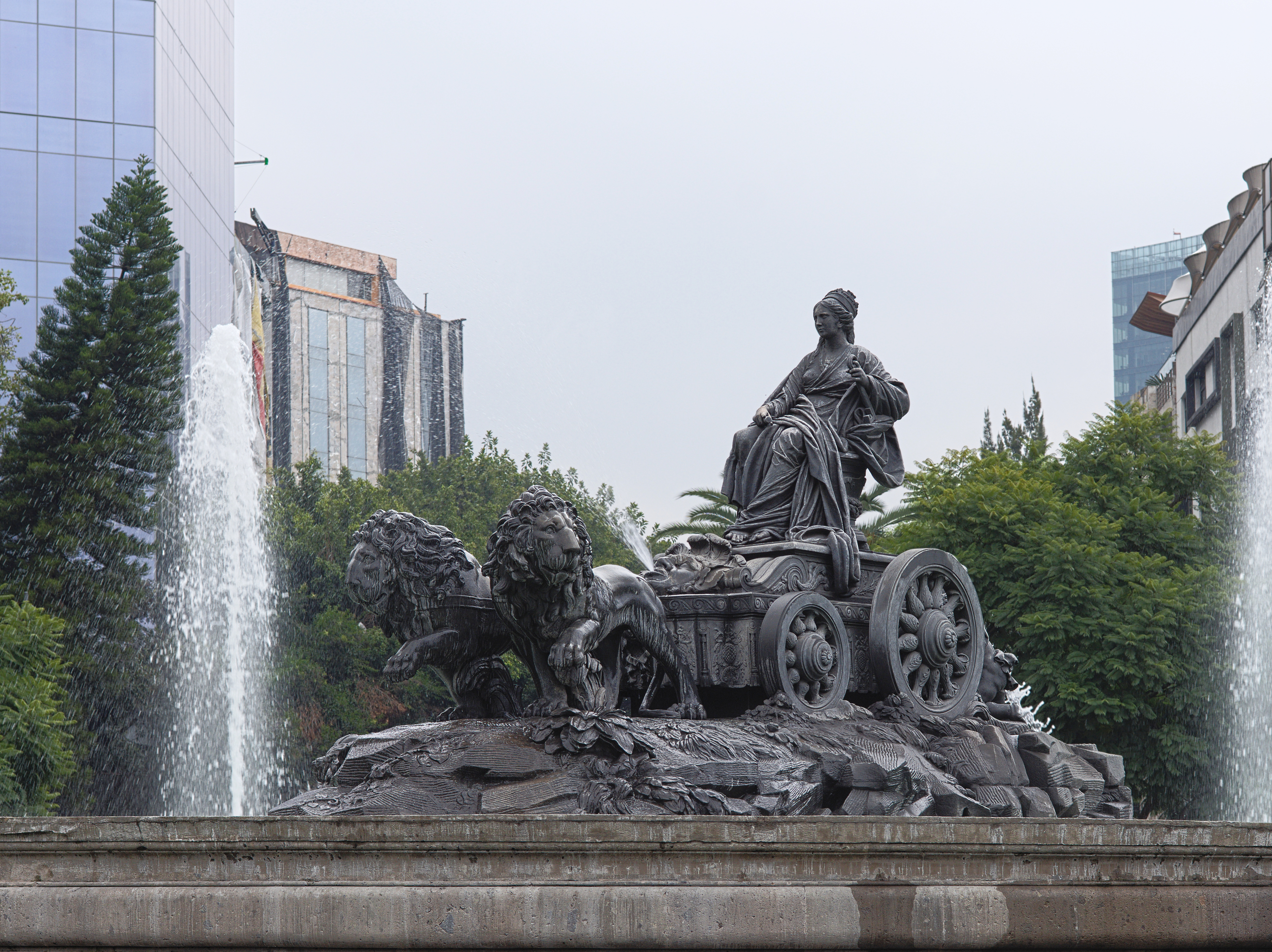
Fuente de Cibeles in Mexico City, was made in 1980 by the community of Spanish residents in Mexico, is a bronze replica of the fountain located in the Plaza de Cibeles in Madrid.

Outside of Europe, the Americas have the largest population of people with ancestors from Spain. These include people of full or partial Spanish ancestry.

=== People with Spanish ancestry ===
| Country | Population (% of country) | Reference | Criterion |
|---|---|---|---|
| Mexico: Spanish Mexican | 120,000,000 (>90%) | | estimated: 30–40% as Whites; 40-50% as Mestizos. |
| United States: Spanish American | 50,000,000 (16%) | | 10,017,244 who identify themselves with direct ancestry from Spain. 26,735,713 (53.0%) (8.7% of total U.S. population) Hispanics in the United States who identify as white (sometimes mixed with other European origins) or Mestizo via Mexico, Central and South America. |
| Venezuela: Spanish Venezuelan | 25,079,923 (90%) | | 43% as white and 51% as mestizos. |
| Brazil: Spanish Brazilian | 15,000,000 (8%) | | estimate by Bruno Ayllón. |
| Colombia: Spanish Colombian | 39,000,000 (86%) | | Self-description as "Mestizo, white and mulatto" |
| Cuba: Spanish Cuban | 10,050,849 (89%) | | Self-description as white, mulatto and mestizo |
| Puerto Rico: Spanish Puerto Rican | 3,064,862 (80.5%) | | Self-description as white. 83,879 (2%) identified as Spanish citizens |
| Canada: Spanish Canadian | 325,730 (1%) | | Self-description |
| Australia: Spanish Australian | 58,271 (0.3%) | | Self-description |

The listing above shows the nine countries with known collected data on people with ancestors from Spain, although the definitions of each of these are somewhat different and the numbers cannot really be compared. Spanish Chilean of Chile and Spanish Uruguayan of Uruguay could be included by percentage (each at above 40%) instead of numeral size.

== See also ==
- Demographics of Spain
- Hispanosphere
- Genetic history of the Iberian Peninsula
- Nationalisms and regionalisms of Spain
- Nationalities and regions of Spain
- Spanish nationalities and regional identities
  - Andalusian people
  - Aragonese people
  - Asturian people
  - Balearic people
  - Basque people
  - Cagot
  - Canarian people
  - Cantabrian people
  - Castilian people
  - Catalan people
  - Extremaduran people
  - Galician people
  - Leonese people
  - Valencian people
  - Vaqueiros de alzada
- Languages of Spain
  - Spanish (see also dialects and varieties)
  - Catalan/Valencian
  - Basque
  - Galician
  - Aranese
  - Aragonese
  - Asturian
  - Judaeo-Spanish
  - Leonese
  - Murcian language
- Ancient peoples of Spain
  - Pre-Roman peoples of the Iberian Peninsula
    - Iberians
    - Celtiberians
    - Gallaeci, Lusitanians, Cantabrians, Vascones
  - Greeks and Punics (Phoenicians and Carthaginians)
  - Guanches (in the Canary Islands)
  - Romans
  - Suebi
  - Vandals
  - Visigoths
  - Moors of the Al-Andalus (Arabs/Berbers)
  - History of the Jews in Spain
- Peoples with Spanish ancestry
  - Criollos (Spaniards in the former Spanish Empire)
  - Afro-Spaniards
  - Emancipados
  - Fernandinos
  - Latin Americans
  - Latino Americans
  - Isleños
  - Louisiana Creole people
  - Spanish Americans
  - Spanish Argentinians
  - Spanish Australians
  - Spanish Brazilians
  - Spanish Britons
  - Spanish Canadians
  - Spanish Central Americans
  - Spanish Chileans
  - Spanish Equatoguineans
  - Spanish Filipino
  - Spanish Mexican
  - Spanish Peruvians
  - Spanish Puerto Ricans
  - Spanish Uruguayans
  - Spanish Colombians
  - White Latin Americans

== Sources ==
- Castro, Americo. Willard F. King and Selma Margaretten, trans. The Spaniards: An Introduction to Their History. Berkeley, California: University of California Press, 1980. ISBN 0-520-04177-1.
- Chapman, Robert. Emerging Complexity: The Later Pre-History of South-East Spain, Iberia, and the West Mediterranean. Cambridge: Cambridge University Press, 1990. ISBN 0-521-23207-4.
- Goodwin, Godfrey. Islamic Spain. San Francisco: Chronicle Books, 1990. ISBN 0-87701-692-5.
- Harrison, Richard. Spain at the Dawn of History: Iberians, Phoenicians, and Greeks. New York: Thames & Hudson, 1988. ISBN 0-500-02111-2.
- James, Edward (ed.). Visigothic Spain: New Approaches. Oxford: Clarendon Press, 1980. ISBN 0-19-822543-1.
- Jónsson, Már (2007). "The expulsion of the Moriscos from Spain in 1609–1614: the destruction of an Islamic periphery". Journal of Global History. 2 (2): 195–212. doi:10.1017/S1740022807002252. S2CID 154793596.
- Thomas, Hugh. The Slave Trade: The History of the Atlantic Slave Trade 1440–1870. London: Picador, 1997. ISBN 0-330-35437-X.
- The genomic history of the Iberian Peninsula over the past 8000 years (Science, 15 March 2019, Vol. 363, Issue 6432, pp. 1230–1234)
