= Equatorial Guinean immigration to Spain =

Total population
- 26.649 (2025)

Regions with significant populations
- Madrid, Barcelona, Valencia, Zaragoza, Palma de Mallorca, Valladolid, Las Palmas

Languages
- Equatoguinean Spanish, Fang, Bubi

Religion
- mainly Roman Catholicism

The presence of people from Equatorial Guinea in Spain dates back to the 1990s.

== Numbers ==
As of 2025, in Spain, there are 26.649 regular immigrants from Equatorial Guinea. The five cities with the most people from Equatorial Guinea are: Benidorm, Marbella, Valencia, Barcelona and Málaga.

== See also ==
- Spanish immigration to Equatorial Guinea
- Arabs in Spain
- Afro-Spaniards
- Black people in Spain
