= José Elo =

Equatoguinean footballer (born 2000)

Personal information
- Full name: José Elo Ayeto
- Date of birth: 21 October 2000 (age 26)
- Place of birth: Alcorcón, Spain
- Height: 1.90 m (6 ft 3 in)
- Position: Centre-back

Team information
- Current team: CSM Olimpia Satu Mare
- Number: 19

Youth career
- –2017: Rayo Majadahonda
- 2017–2018: Las Rozas
- 2018–2019: Aravaca

Senior career*
Years	Team	Apps	(Gls)
2019–2020	Atlético Villalba	23	(1)
2020–2021	Villanueva	12	(1)
2021–2022	Fuenlabrada Promesas	33	(2)
2022–2023	Navalcarnero	26	(0)
2023–2024	Mérida	11	(2)
2024	AC Oulu	17	(0)
2025	Banga	10	(0)
2025–2026	Politehnica Iași	20	(0)
2026–	CSM Olimpia Satu Mare	8	(0)

International career^{‡}
2022–	Equatorial Guinea	5	(1)
- * Club domestic league appearances and goals as of 31 October 2026 ‡ National team caps and goals as of 25 March 2026

José Elo Ayeto (born 21 October 2000) is a professional footballer who plays as a centre-back for Liga II club CSM Olimpia Satu Mare. Born in Spain, he plays for the Equatorial Guinea national team.

== Club career ==
Elo played in the youth sectors of Rayo Majadahonda, Las Rozas and Aravaca until 2019.

After playing in the lower divisions in Spain since 2019 for Atlético Villalba, Villanueva CF, Fuenlabrada Promesas, Navalcarnero and Mérida, Elo moved to Finland in February 2024 and signed with Veikkausliiga club AC Oulu. On 17 February 2024, Elo debuted with his new club, in a Finnish League Cup match against Vaasan Palloseura (VPS). He debuted in Veikkausliiga on 6 April 2024, in a 2024 season opening match against SJK Seinäjoki.

On 21 March 2025, Elo signed with Lithuanian A Lyga club Banga Gargždai.

In July 2025, Elo signed with Romanian Liga II club Politehnica Iași.

On 21 August 2026, Elo signed with Romanian Liga III club Olimpia Satu Mare.

== International career ==
Elo represents the Equatorial Guinea national team. He debuted at the full international level on 9 June 2023, scoring a goal in a 2023 Africa Cup of Nations qualifying match against Libya, helping his side to get a 1–1 away draw. Elo was named in the Equatorial Guinean final squad in the 2023 Africa Cup of Nations tournament, competed in January and February 2024.

== Personal life ==
Elo was born in Alcorcón, Spain to Equatoguinean Fang parents – his mother is from Akurenam and his father is from Ebibeyin. He holds Spanish and Equatoguinean citizenships.

== Career statistics ==
=== Club ===
As of 31 October 2026

Appearances and goals by club, season and competition
Club	Season	League			National cup (Note: Includes Copa del Rey, Suomen Cup and Lithuanian Cup)		Continental		Other		Total	
Club	Season	Division	Apps	Goals	Apps	Goals	Apps	Goals	Apps	Goals	Apps	Goals
Atlético Villalba	2019–20	Preferente Madrid	23	1	–		–		–		23	1
Villanueva	2020–21	Tercera División	12	1	–		–		–		12	1
Fuenlabrada Promesas	2021–22	Tercera Federación	33	2	–		–		–		33	2
Navalcarnero	2022–23	Segunda Federación	26	0	0	0	–		–		26	0
Mérida	2023–24	Primera Federación	11	2	–		–		–		11	2
AC Oulu	2024	Veikkausliiga	17	0	3	0	–		2 (Note: Includes Finnish League Cup)	0	22	0
Banga	2025	A Lyga	10	0	1	0	–		–		11	0
Politehnica Iași	2025–26	Liga II	20	0	0	0	–		–		20	0
CSM Olimpia Satu Mare	2026–27	Liga II	8	0	0	0	–		–		8	0
Career total			160	6	4	0	0	0	2	0	166	6

=== International ===
As of match played 25 March 2026

Equatorial Guinea
Year	Apps	Goals
2022	1	0
2023	2	1
2024	1	0
2025	0	0
2026	1	0
Total	6	1

=== International goals ===
As of match played 6 September 2023. Equatorial Guinea score listed first, score column indicates score after each Elo goal.

List of international goals scored by José Elo
No.	Date	Venue	Opponent	Score	Result	Competition
1	6 September 2023	Benina Martyrs Stadium, Benina, Libya	Libya	1–0	1–1	2023 Africa Cup of Nations qualification
