= Spanish diaspora in Equatorial Guinea =

- (Spain) (Equatorial Guinea)
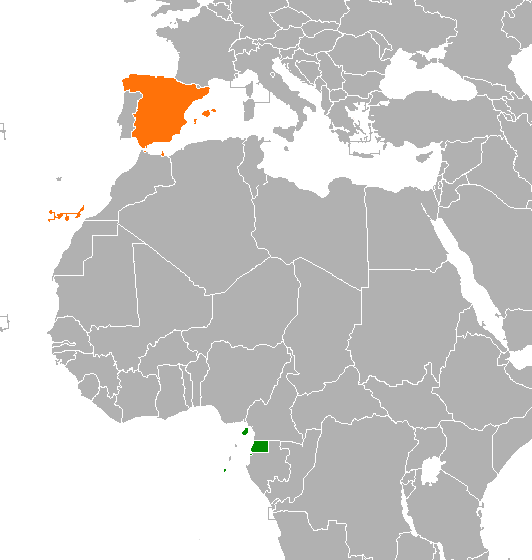

Total population
- 29,000 including dual nationals and descendants).

Regions with significant populations
- Malabo, Río Muni, Bata.

Languages
- Equatoguinean Spanish, Fang, Bube.

Religion
- Catholicism, Protestantism, Judaism

Related ethnic groups
- Spanish, Bubi people, Fang people, Fernandino peoples, White Africans of European ancestry, Mestizos, Mulattos

The Spanish diaspora in Equatorial Guinea is made of people of Spanish ancestral origin who are residents born or living in Equatorial Guinea. This group is closely linked with the Fernandino people, a creole people who developed Spanish Guinea and Equatorial Guinea, mostly in Bioko island (historically named Fernando Po).

== Settlement ==
A group of prosperous plantations was set up by Castilian and above all Valencian landowners, whose cultural level was considerably above that of the Spaniards that continued to emigrate to the Americas, and since Spanish Guinea was never an attractive place for massive immigration, those Spaniards that chose to live in Spanish Guinea generally made this choice in view of superior salaries or perquisites, available only for the middle and professional classes.

Spaniards in Equatorial Guinea did not generally immigrate with the intent of permanently establishing themselves, but rather of working for a given time period, and nearly always returned to Spain. The result was a reduced sense of permanency, and a greater bilateral contact between Spain and expatriate Spaniards in Guinea. Even though a number of Spaniards were born in Spanish Guinea, few considered themselves as anything other than Spaniards, similar to their countrymen in the Canary Islands or Ifni, and there were few families that had lived continuously in Spanish Guinea for more than a single generation.

The amount of miscegenation was also considerably less in Guinea than in the Americas, as Spanish settlers brought a higher proportion of Spanish women, a fact visibly evident in the small number of mulatto Guineans (Fernandino), as opposed to the Caribbean region of Latin America. However, during the 1940s and 1950s an increased number of mulatto offspring were born to indigenous women and Spaniard men, mostly out of wedlock. These mulatto offspring were usually left be cared for by their mother and maternal family, and were more likely to identify as the tribe they were born into. Most married or procreated with other indigenous Africans. As a result of this era, as well as further interracial unions post-independence, a considerable amount of white Spaniard ancestry persists in the country, even among those with a black, or indigenous, phenotype. It's believed that some of the mixed ancestry resulted from rape, as forced servitude/slavery did, in fact, exist in the country through the course of Spanish domination there. It is further believed that some of the non-consent occurred through the corruption and coercion methods used by various Christian missionary organizations posted there, including those belonging to the Roman Catholic church, during the Spanish colonial era in the country.

From the earliest days of Spanish colonization, Santa Isabel contained numerous Europeans of various nations, as well as Kru, Mende, Ibo, Calabar, Hausa, Krio, Angolans, and Sao Tomenses, and even a small contingent of Asians. Furthermore, the island experienced small numbers of repatriated indentured slave-servants from Cuba and Brazil during the 17th century and 19th century. Most Spanish settlers left after Spanish Guinea became independent in 1968. Many more Spanish Equatoguineans left the country during the brutal rule of Masie Nguema Biyogo, but have returned since his overthrow and execution.

== Language and religion ==
Since their ancestors ruled the country, they made Spanish the first national official language. They also speak the country's second official language, French, and any of the 2 main Bantu languages, Fang and Bubi. Indirect evidence of the cultural and educational level of the Spanish colonizers in Guinea is found in the particulars of Equatorial Guinean Spanish, which, while containing a number of significant differences from Peninsular Spanish, contains virtually no elements typical of uneducated Spanish usage, such as those common in Mexican Spanish. Analogical forms such as haiga, losotros, etc., are not found in Equatoguinean Spanish. The same goes for non-etymological prefixes such as arrecordar and entodavía. The only consistent phonetic deformations are those characteristic of middle-class Spaniards from central Spain: reduction of -ado to -ao, luego to logo, etc. In religion, most of them are Christians, mostly Roman Catholics and a few Protestants. Their ancestors brought Christianity to the nation and made it one of the largest Christian countries in Africa.

== See also ==
- Equatoguinean Spanish (language)
- Equatorial Guinea–Spain relations
- Fernandino people
- Afro-Spaniards
- Emancipados
