= Ricky Mendizábal =

Equatoguinean basketball player

No. 12 – CB Virgen de la Concha
- Positions: Power forward, center
- League: Liga EBA

Personal information
- Born: 21 October 1997 (age 29) Zumarraga, Spain
- Listed height: 2.00 m (6 ft 7 in)

Career history
- 2016–2017: Ointxe! Arrasateko SKE
- 2017–2018: Club Ourense Baloncesto
- 2018–2019: Araberri BC
- 2020–: CB Virgen de la Concha

Diosdado Mendizábal Mifumu (born 21 October 1997), known as Ricky Mendizábal, is a basketball player who plays as a power forward for Liga EBA club CB Virgen de la Concha. Born in Spain, he plays for the Equatorial Guinea national team.

== Early life ==
Mendizábal was born in Zumarraga and is of Equatorial Guinean descent.

== Club career ==
Mendizábal is a Saski Baskonia product. After four youth seasons there, he moved to Ointxe! Arrasateko SKE, where he made his Liga EBA debut.

== International career ==
Mendizábal has played for the Equatorial Guinea national basketball team in January 2020 at the AfroBasket 2021 qualification (pre-qualifiers group C).
