= Paloma del Sol =

Paloma Loribo
- Also known as: Paloma del Sol
- Born: Bioko, Equatorial Guinea
- Occupations: singer, composer
- Formerly of: Hijas del Sol

Paloma Loribo known artistically as Paloma del Sol, is an Equatorial Guinean singer, composer, painter, actress and writer.

== Life ==
Born in the island of Bioko, is settled in Spain, and is famous mainly for being one of the members of the duo, Hijas del Sol.

Paloma began very young in the music world in Equatorial Guinea, although very soon, in 1992, after her participation with her aunt Piruchi Apo Botupá in the Hispanic Song Festival of the Guinean Hispanic Cultural Center, where they won prizes for the best original song and the best choreography traveled to Spain for Expo '92 and that same year participated in the OTI Festival with their aunt Piruchi Apo.

Since then they formed the duo "Hijas del Sol". Since their separation in 2006, Paloma decided to take a musical break and focused on other facets, such as painting and writing. She made several pictorial exhibitions and wrote her first book, Cuentos Africanos.

She also toured the Canary Islands as a storyteller, giving stories from her country. As a painter, Paloma del Sol began in 1995, when she began to express her intimate perceptions, her most personal sensations. Dove paints with mineral images about Africa.

At the end of 2010, Paloma del Sol publishes her first solo album, Goza de la Vida. She has also published a new book, called La batalla de los Dioses, in addition to continuing to exhibit her paintings throughout the Spanish geography.

In 2013 she published her novel Pasos Desconocidos becoming a great sales success, having to publish a second edition. In 2015 she published the novel Momentos Fugaces.

In April 2016 she released her second solo album, Atrévete a ser Feliz, with songs in bubi and in Spanish being the song that gives title to the album part of the soundtrack of the movie Relaxing Cup of Coffee, where she also participates as an actress and was nominated for Best Original Song at Goya Awards in 2017.
