= Ruth Álvarez =

Spanish footballer (born 2000)

Personal information
- Full name: Ruth Álvarez Bela
- Date of birth: 5 June 2000 (age 26)
- Place of birth: Palma de Mallorca, Spain
- Height: 1.72 m (5 ft 8 in)
- Position: Left-back

Youth career
- 2009–2012: Ferriolense
- 2012–2013: Collerense

Senior career*
Years	Team	Apps	(Gls)
2013–2014	Atlético Collerense	18	(10)
2014–2015	Collerense C	2	(2)
2014–2016	Collerense B		
2015–2019	Collerense	28+	(1+)
2019–2022	Eibar	67	(1)
2022–2024	Madrid CFF	21	(0)
2024–2025	Atlético Baleares	7	(0)

International career^{‡}
2021–2022	Spain U23	3	(0)
- * Club domestic league appearances and goals as of 10 November 2024 ‡ National team caps and goals as of 5 September 2022

Ruth Álvarez Bela (born 5 June 2000) is a Spanish professional footballer who plays as a left-back.

== Early life ==
Álvarez was born in Palma de Mallorca to a Spanish father and an Equatorial Guinean Bubi mother.

== Club career ==
Álvarez is the youngest player to appear in Primera División, when she debuted for Collerense aged 15 years and 100 days at the 2015–16 Primera División.

== International career ==
Álvarez is not capped for Spain, but has represented the Balearic Islands women's autonomous football team at under-12, under-16 and under-18 levels. She has also appeared with the Majorca women's local football team at under-13, under-16 and under-18 levels.

In January 2016, Álvarez has had a met with members of the then technical staff of the Equatorial Guinea national football team.

On 29 November 2021, Álvarez played for Spain at under-23 level. She remains eligible to play for Equatorial Guinea.

== Personal life ==
Álvarez has been in a relationship with Japanese footballer Tomo Matsukawa, who was her teammate at Eibar.
