= Cape Verdeans in Spain =

Ethnic group

Total population
- 65,000

Regions with significant populations
- Bembibre, Madrid, Barcelona, Valencia, Canary Islands, Balearic Islands

Languages
- Spanish, Portuguese, Cape Verdean Creole

Religion
- Roman Catholicism

Related ethnic groups
- Black people in Spain, Afro-Spanish

Cape Verdean Spaniards are residents of Spain whose ancestry originated in Cape Verde.

In 2012, it was estimated that there were 65,000 people of Cape Verdean descent in Spain.
