= Virginia Buika =

Spanish musician, actress, director and producer

Virginia Buika (born 1976 in Alcalá de Henares, Spain) is a Spanish musician, actress, director and producer. She is of Equatoguinean descent.
