= Cristian Ebea =

Equatoguinean footballer (born 2001)

Personal information
- Full name: Cristian San Francisco Ngua Ebea Metehe
- Date of birth: 2 February 2001 (age 25)
- Place of birth: Madrid, Spain
- Positions: Right back; right winger

Team information
- Current team: Caudal

Youth career
- 20??–2015: Parla Escuela
- 2015–2017: Móstoles URJC
- 2017–2018: Trival Valderas
- 2018–2019: Parla Escuela
- 2019: InterSoccer Madrid
- 2020: Getafe

Senior career*
Years	Team	Apps	(Gls)
2020–2022	Langreo B	12	(3)
2021–2022	Langreo	24	(0)
2021	→ San Martín (loan)	14	(3)
2022–2024	Sporting Atlético	49	(1)
2024–2025	Rayo Majadahonda	18	(0)
2026	Llanera	15	(3)
2026–	Caudal	0	(0)

International career^{‡}
2022–	Equatorial Guinea	6	(0)
- * Club domestic league appearances and goals as of 25 June 2026 ‡ National team caps and goals as of 17 November 2024

Cristian San Francisco Ngua Ebea Metehe (born 2 February 2001), known as Cristian Ebea and sometimes as Cris Ebea, is a footballer who plays as a right back for Tercera Federación club Caudal. Born in Spain, he plays for the Equatorial Guinea national team.

== Early life ==
Ebea was born in Madrid, Spain to Equatoguinean Fang parents, but moved to Equatorial Guinea shortly after. He attended the E'Waiso Ipola enfants college in Malabo. He went to Valencia at 6 and back to Madrid at 8. After that, his older brother enrolled him in CP Parla Escuela.

== Club career ==
Ebea is a CP Parla Escuela, CD Móstoles URJC, CF Trival Valderas, Academia InterSoccer Madrid and Getafe CF product. He has played for UP Langreo and EI San Martín in Spain.

On 19 January 2026, Ebea signed for Llanera.

== International career ==
Ebea made his senior debut for Equatorial Guinea on 29 March 2022, as a 74-minute substitute in a 0–0 friendly draw against Angola.

== Career statistics ==
=== International ===
As of 29 March 2022

Equatorial Guinea
Year	Apps	Goals
2022	1	0
Total	1	0
