= Ruslan Mba =

Spanish footballer (born 2010)

Personal information
- Full name: Ruslan Mba Hernando
- Date of birth: 27 February 2010 (age 16)
- Place of birth: Barcelona, Spain
- Height: 1.65 m (5 ft 5 in)
- Position: Winger

Team information
- Current team: Barcelona

Youth career
- Horta
- Barcelona

International career^{‡}
Years	Team	Apps	(Gls)
2024	Spain U15	4	(0)
2024–	Spain U16	5	(1)
- ‡ National team caps and goals as of 6 November 2025

Ruslan Mba Hernando (born 27 February 2010) is a Spanish footballer who plays as a winger for Barcelona.

== Early life ==
Mba was born on 27 February 2010. Born in Spain, he is of Equatoguinean descent through his father.

== Club career ==
As a youth player, Mba joined the youth academy of Horta. Following his stint there, he joined the youth academy of La Liga side Barcelona.

== International career ==
Mba is a Spain youth international. On 17 September 2024, he debuted for the Spain national under-16 football team during a 3–2 away friendly win over the Italy national under-16 football team.

== Style of play ==
Mba plays as a winger. Spanish newspaper Sport wrote in 2024 that "Ruslan's power and speed are very difficult to stop because the former Horta player is a specialist in dribbling and driving forward with an electric change of pace".
