= Àngel Mañana =

Equatoguinean basketball player

CB Marcelina Benifaió
- Position: Shooting guard
- League: Primera División de Baloncesto

Personal information
- Born: 15 February 1985 (age 41) Valencia, Spain
- Listed height: 1.86 m (6 ft 1 in)
- Listed weight: 85 kg (187 lb)

Career history
- 2003–20??: Valencia Basket
- 2012–2013: Mongomo Basket
- 2014–2015: CB Jovens Almassera
- 201?–201?: CB Tabernes Blanques
- 201?–present: CB Marcelina Benifaió

Àngel Lluís Mañana Fernández (born 15 February 1985) is a basketball player who plays as a shooting guard for Primera División de Baloncesto club CB Marcelina Benifaió. Born in Spain, he plays for the Equatorial Guinea national team.

== Early life ==
Mañana was born in Valencia to an Equatorial Guinean father and a Spanish mother.

== Club career ==
Mañana is a Valencia Basket product, who later played in the United States, France, England and he has also been part of the Mongomo Basket squad in Equatorial Guinea.

== International career ==
Mañana has joined the Equatorial Guinea national basketball team in March 2018.
