= Larry Abia =

Equatoguinean basketball player

No. 10 – CP La Roda
- Position: Small forward
- League: LEB Plata

Personal information
- Born: 8 August 1993 (age 33) Valencia, Spain
- Listed height: 1.96 m (6 ft 5 in)
- Listed weight: 90 kg (198 lb)

Career history
- 2011–2014: Valencia Basket
- 2014–2019: Básquet Coruña
- 2019–2020: CP La Roda

Larry Abia Sila (born 8 August 1993) is a professional basketball player who plays for LEB Plata club CP La Roda. Born in Spain, he plays for the Equatorial Guinea national team.

== Personal life ==
Abia was born in Valencia to Equatoguinean Bubi parents. He is a cousin of former handballer Davis Davis.

== Professional career ==
Abia is a product of Valencia Basket. Later, he played for Básquet Coruña.

== International career ==
Abia joined the Equatorial Guinea national basketball team in January 2020. He had previously competed for Spain at under–20 level.
