= Justo Bolekia Boleká =

Equatoguinean scholar (born 1954)

Justo Bolekia
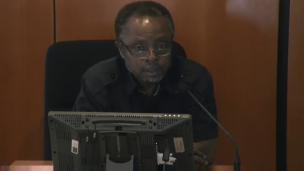
- Born: Justo Bolekia Boleká; 13 December 1954 (age 71); Santiago de Baney, Spanish Guinea
- Occupations: scholar, writer

Justo Bolekia Boleká (born 13 December 1954) is an Equatorial Guinean scholar and writer of Bubi descent.

== Life and career ==
He attended college at Complutense University of Madrid obtaining a Doctorate degree in Modern Philology in 1986. On June 8, 2007, he received a Ph.D. from the University of Salamanca, and was awarded their PhD Extraordinary Award.

He was Acting Professor of French Studies at the University of Salamanca from 1987 until 1990, he then became Assistant Professor of French Studies at the same university. He has also served as Director of the Escuela Universitaria de Educación de Ávila. He has published numerous books of essays and poetry.

His work has been studied by American professors interested in Afro-Hispanic literary production, and has been included in anthologies of poetry (Literatura de Guinea Ecuatorial, de Donato Ndongo-Bidyogo y Mbare Ngom Faye, 2000; La voz y la escritura 2006: 80 nuevas propuestas poéticas, 2006). He also authored such works as Panorama de la Literatura en español en Guinea Ecuatorial published in El español en el mundo. Anuario del Instituto Cervantes, 2005.

Politically, he has been responsible for the political group Demócratas por el Cambio para Guinea Ecuatorial, and is Permanent Delegate of the MAIB Abroad (Movement for the Self-Determination of Bioko Island), as opposed to the regime of Teodoro Obiang.

== Miscellaneous works ==
=== Articles ===
- El aumento o actualizador definido en lengua bubi (en "Muntu, Revue scientifique et Culturelle", n.7, Gabón, 1987)
- Panorama de la literatura en español en Guinea Ecuatorial (en Anuario del Instituto Cervantes, 2005)
- La Realidad Literaria y Lingüística de Guinea Ecuatorial (en El Fingidor nº 19–20, mayo-diciembre de 2003, Revista de Cultura)
- Literatura Francófona Africana (en Pueblos nº 2003, Revista de Información y Debate. ISSN 1577-4376)
- Etc.

=== Thesis ===
- Aspectos lingüísticos y sociolingüísticos del bubi del noreste (tesis doctoral, Editorial de la Universidad Complutense de Madrid, 1988)
- La enculturación bubi desde los préstamos del pidgin-English. Procesos de lexicalización progresiva (Universidad de Salamanca, 2007)

=== Instructional books ===
- Curso de Lengua Bubi, (ISBN 84-7232-608-X Centro Cultural Hispano-Guineano, 1991)
- Antroponimia bubi. Estudio Lingüístico (1994)
- Narraciones bubis. Otra morfología del cuento africano (1994)
- Breve diccionario bubi-castellano y castellano-bubi (1997)
- Aprender el bubi. Método para principiantes (1999)
- Lenguas y Poder en África (2001)
- Aproximación a la historia de Guinea Ecuatorial (2003)
- Cuentos bubis de la isla de Bioko (2003)
- La Francofonía. El nuevo rostro del colonialismo en África (2005)
- Poesía en lengua bubi (Antología y estudio) (2007)
- Lingüística bantu a través del bubi (2008)
- La Francofonía. El nuevo rostro del colonialismo en África. 2ª edición corregida y ampliada (2008)
- Diccionario español-bubi/Ë ribúkku ra balláa béböbé-lëëpanná (2009)
- Recuerdos del abuelo Bayebé y otros relatos bubis (2014)

=== Poetry ===
- Löbëla (1999)
- Ombligos y raíces. Poesía africana (2006)
- Las reposadas imágenes de antaño (2008)

=== Other books ===
- Lenguas para fines específicos IV. Investigación y enseñanza (1996)
- Ciencia y memoria de África: actas de las III Jornadas sobre Expediciones científicas y africanismo español, 1898–1998 (2002)
- La Recuperación de la Memoria. Creación cultural e identidad nacional en la literatura Hispano-negroafricana (2004)
- La Voz y la Escritura. Antología 2006 (2006)
- Etnias, Estado y Poder en África (2005)
- De Boca en Boca. Estudios de Literatura Oral de Guinea Ecuatorial (2004)
- De Promisión (2007)
- El Futuro de las Lenguas. Diversidad frente a Uniformidad (2008)
- Un mundo de relatos. Antología (2009)
- Caminos y veredas: narrativas de Guinea Ecuatorial (2011)
- Etc.

== See also ==
- Antumi Toasijé – related Equatorial Guinean (By African traditional custom) Pan-Africanist
