= Ntji Tounkara =

Spanish footballer (born 2004)

Personal information
- Full name: Ntji Tounkara Diarra
- Date of birth: 10 January 2005 (age 21)
- Place of birth: Huesca, Spain
- Height: 1.78 m (5 ft 10 in)
- Position: Midfielder

Team information
- Current team: Ponferradina

Youth career
- Huesca
- 2021–2023: Alavés

Senior career*
Years	Team	Apps	(Gls)
2023–2024	Alavés C	29	(3)
2024–2025	Córdoba B	30	(1)
2025–2026	Córdoba	2	(0)
2025–2026	→ Sanluqueño (loan)	20	(1)
2026	→ Alcorcón (loan)	10	(0)
2026–	Ponferradina	0	(0)
- * Club domestic league appearances and goals as of 10 June 2026

Ntji Tounkara Diarra (born 10 January 2005) is a Spanish footballer who plays as a midfielder for SD Ponferradina.

== Career ==
Born in Huesca, Aragon to Malian parents, Tounkara began his career with hometown side SD Huesca before moving to Deportivo Alavés in 2021. He made his senior debut with the C-team on 9 September 2023, starting in a 1–0 Tercera Federación home win over SD Beasain, and scored his first goal fourteen days later, netting the opener in a 5–1 home routing of Touring KE.

On 16 July 2024, Tounkara signed for Córdoba CF and was initially assigned to the reserves also in the fifth division. He made his first team debut the following 2 May, coming on as a late substitute for Isma Ruiz in a 4–2 Segunda División home win over Cádiz CF.

On 15 August 2025, Tounkara was loaned to Primera Federación side Atlético Sanluqueño CF for one year. Despite being an undisputed starter, he moved to fellow league team AD Alcorcón also in a temporary deal on 30 January 2026.

On 24 July 2026, Tounkara moved to SD Ponferradina also in division three.
