= Dolores Johnson Sastre =

Spanish politician and journalist

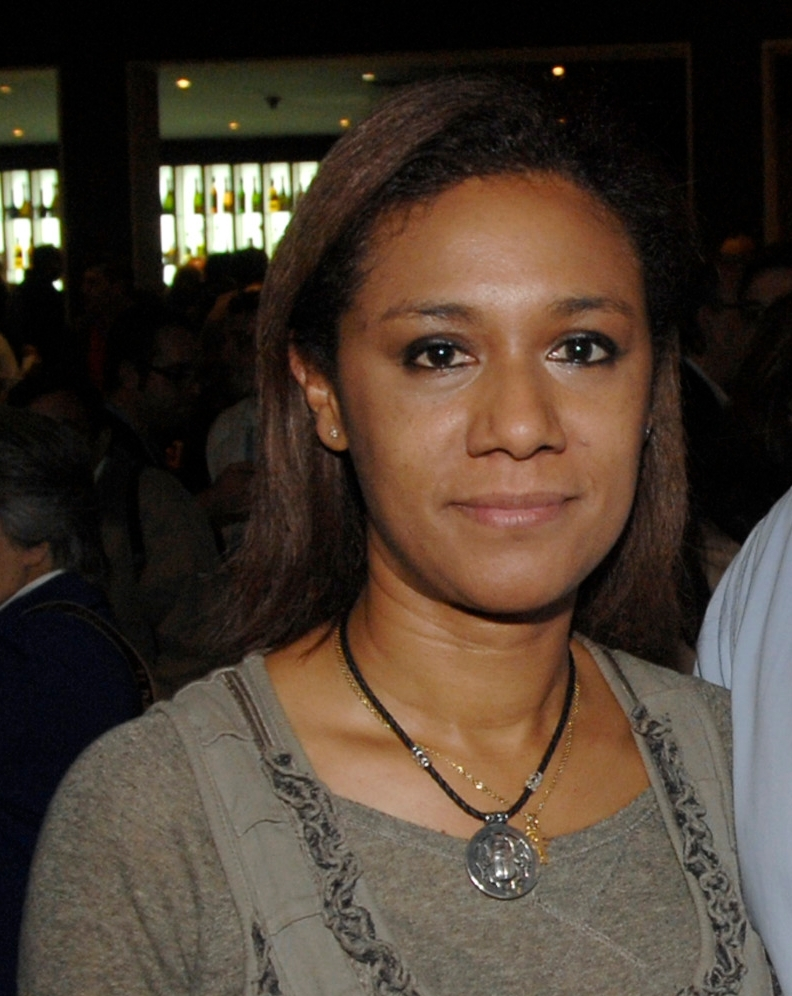
- Johnson celebrating the results of the 2011 general election

Councilor of Tourism, Culture, and Sports of the Generalitat Valenciana
- In office 22 June 2011 – 7 December 2011
- President: Francisco Camps; Alberto Fabra
- Preceded by: Trinidad Miró Mira (Culture and Sports); María Belén Juste (Tourism)
- Succeeded by: María José Catalá (Education, Culture, and Sports); Máximo Buch Torralva (Economy, Industry, Occupation, Tourism, and Commerce)

Spokesperson for the Council of the Generalitat Valenciana
- In office 22 June 2011 – 2 January 2012
- President: Francisco Camps; Alberto Fabra
- Preceded by: Paula Sánchez de León
- Succeeded by: José Císcar

Personal details
- Born: 1969 (age 56–57) Valencia, Spain
- Party: People's Party (PP)
- Education: University of Valencia
- Occupation: Politician, journalist, television presenter, television channel director

Dolores Johnson Sastre (born 1969), also known as Lola Johnson, is a Spanish politician and journalist. She has been a councilor of the Generalitat Valenciana for the People's Party (PP) in the governments of presidents Francisco Camps and Alberto Fabra.

== Biography ==
Dolores Johnson Sastre was born in Valencia to a Valencian mother and Equatoguinean father. She graduated from the University of Valencia with a degree in law and began to work in the communications field. In 1994 she was a presenter on the Spanish program En primera persona for Nou, with little success.

Two years later, Johnson joined the Valencian affiliate of RTVE, where she presented the weather and was production editor until she became news presenter. In 2002 she became the editor of Canal 37, a television station in Alicante, as well as forming her own production company in an ambitious project that aspired to turn the channel into a regional media conglomerate.

== Radiotelevisió Valenciana ==
In September 2003 Lola Johnson was named subdirector of Nou.

2004 brought the arrival of Francisco Camps at the head of the Generalitat. Johnson returned to Valencia when she was appointed director of Punt 2, the second Valencian public television channel. At this time she directed and presented the Valencian cultural program Encontres, broadcast by the same channel.

In fall 2007, following the reelection of Camps, she was appointed news director of Radiotelevisió Valenciana (RTVV), replacing Lluis Motes. She held this position when the Gürtel case broke. The investigation carried out by Judge Baltasar Garzón revealed a network of political corruption linked to the People's Party.

In November 2009 Johnson advanced further and was appointed director of Televisión Valenciana, which united the various public television stations in the region.

On 22 May 2014 a court of first instance issued a motion in which Johnson and four other former directors of RTVV were charged with a complaint lodged by Compromís relating to €1.3 billion in accumulated losses and contractual irregularities.

== Councilor of Tourism, Culture, and Sports ==
In June 2011 Johnson made the leap into politics when President Camps – at the beginning of the 8th Legislature – appointed her Councilor of Tourism, Culture, and Sports, as well as Spokesperson for the Council of the Generalitat Valenciana ruled by the People's Party. She thus became the first women of Afro-European descent to be part of the Valencian government.

Johnson quit RTVV at that time, leaving Nou with a historically low audience.

One month later – in July 2011 – when Camps resigned due to his connection with the Gürtel case, the new president Alberto Fabra confirmed her as a councilor and spokesperson.

On 5 December 2011, Johnson appeared in the Cortes, where she confirmed that the Generalitat Valenciana would put the Ciudad de la Luz (cinematic studios created on the initiative of filmmaker Luis García Berlanga) on sale.

On 7 December 2011, President Fabra announced her dismissal as spokesperson. She was replaced by José Císcar. Johnson continued in her position as Councilor of Tourism, Culture, and Sports.

On 20 December 2012, Johnson was appointed executive secretary for the coordination of study commissions, a new position in the structure of the People's Party.

Preceded by Trinidad Miró Mira (Culture and Sports); María Belén Juste (Tourism)	Councilor of Tourism, Culture, and Sports of the Generalitat Valenciana; 2011–2012	Succeeded by María José Catalá (Education, Culture, and Sports); Máximo Buch Torralva (Economy, Industry, Occupation, Tourism, and Commerce)
Preceded by Paula Sánchez de León	Spokesperson for the Council of the Generalitat Valenciana; 2011	Succeeded by José Císcar
