= Hijas del Sol =

Las Hijas del Sol
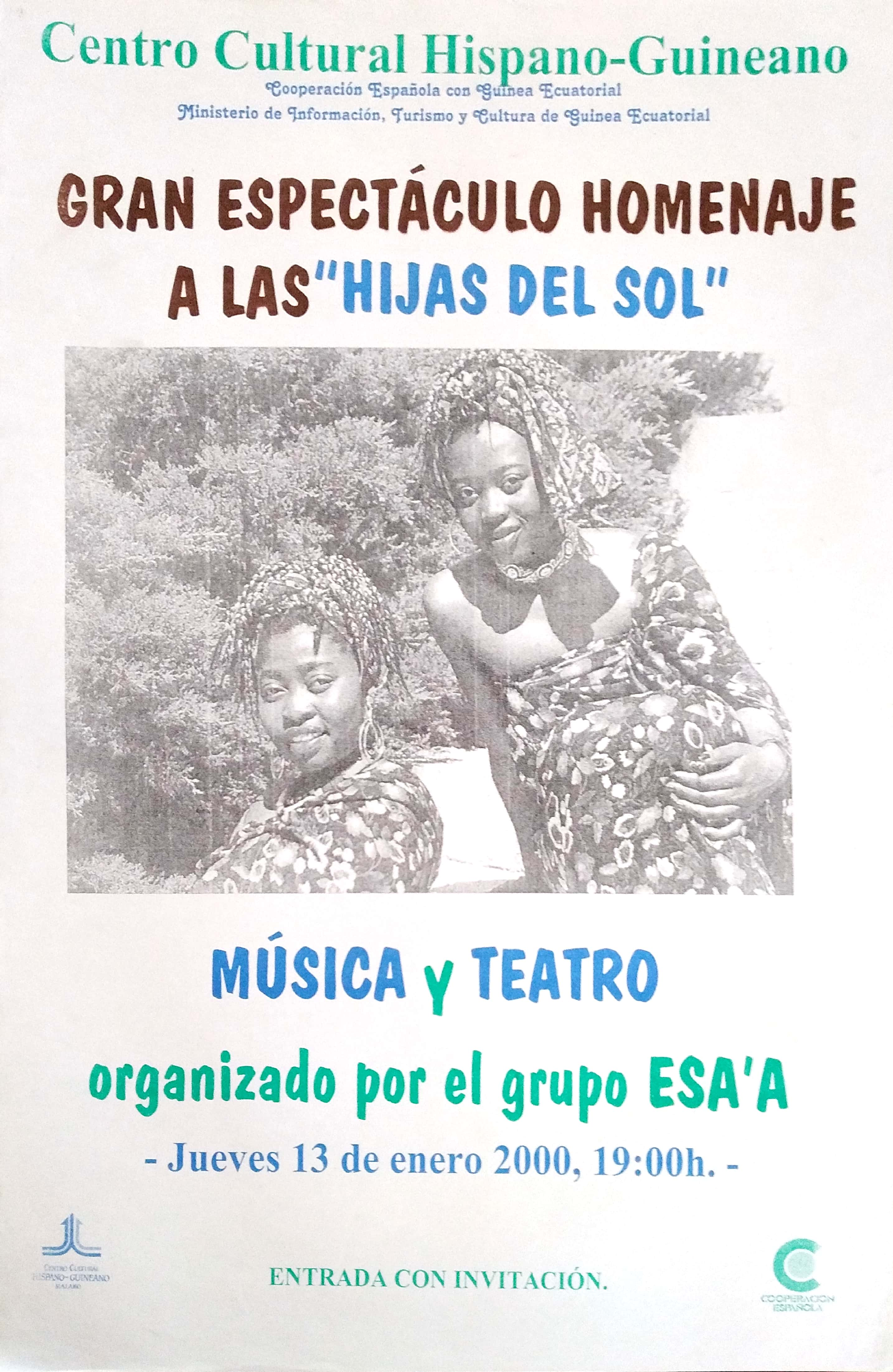
- Hijas del Sol in 2000

Background information
- Genres: Afropop, Jazz, Latin
- Occupations: Singer, songwriter
- Years active: 1992–2006

Hijas del Sol (Spanish: Daughters of the Sun), namely Piruchi Apo Botupá and Paloma Loribo Apo, are an aunt and niece duo from the island of Bioko in Equatorial Guinea who write, sing, and perform songs in both Bube and Spanish. Hijas del Sol's music has elements from both Hispanic and African music traditions, and as such it is very Equatoguinean.

They first performed together in 1992 for a competition in el Centro Cultural Hispano Guineano, where they won prizes for best original song and best choreography. This African traditional music competition was regarded as their musical breakthrough. That year they also performed for the first time in Spain at both the Expo de Sevilla and in the Festival de la OTI. The duo later moved to Madrid, Spain where they became involved with the local cultural scene and met Manu Chao. Chao later became a mentor to the duo.

Their debut album Sibèba (1995) is a blend of more traditional Bube music and their own compositions, sung in both Bube and Spanish. The album was released by the independent record label Nubenegra. Sibèba ("aquello que se quiere conseguir"), can be translated as, "a place of salvation reserved for the best" and the album tells of the traditions of both Bube culture and Catholics religion as well as the problems that immigrants encounter in modern-day Spain. fRoots placed the album at No.1 in its annual listing for 1995 and the album was also released throughout Europe, the US, Canada and Japan.

== Discography ==
List of Albums
Year	Title	Record label
1995	Sibèba	Nubenegra
1998	Kottó	Nubenegra
2000	Kchaba	Nubenegra
2001	Pasaporte Mundial	Sony Music Entertainment España, S.L.
2003	Colores del Amor	Zomba Records Spain, S.L. Madrid (España)
2004	Vivir Esta Locura	BMG Music Spain, S.A.
