= Cristopher Moisés =

Equatoguinean footballer (born 1993)

Crístofer
Personal information
- Full name: Crístofer Moisés Rolín
- Date of birth: 3 September 1993 (age 33)
- Place of birth: Alcalá de Henares, Spain
- Height: 1.83 m (6 ft 0 in)
- Position: Forward

Team information
- Current team: Þróttur R.
- Number: 77

Youth career
- 2007–2008: Vicálvaro
- 2008–2009: San Blas
- 2009–2010: Vicálvaro
- 2010: Vallecas
- 2011: Arganda
- 2011–2012: Alcalá
- 2012–2013: Águilas Moratalaz

Senior career*
Years	Team	Apps	(Gls)
2013	Águilas Moratalaz	4	(0)
2013–2015	Periso	36	(7)
2015–2017	Colonia Moscardó	13	(3)
2017–2018	ADPI Rivas	13	(8)
2019	Skallagrímur	21	(7)
2020	Sindri	11	(8)
2021–2023	Ægir	36	(15)
2024–	Þróttur R.	7	(0)

International career^{‡}
2015	Equatorial Guinea	1	(0)
- * Club domestic league appearances and goals as of 2 November 2024 ‡ National team caps and goals as of 6 June 2015

Crístofer Moisés Rolín (born 3 September 1993) is a footballer who plays as a striker for 1. deild karla club Þróttur R. Born in Spain, he played for the Equatorial Guinea national team.

== Club career ==
Born in Alcalá de Henares, Madrid to Equatorial Guinean parents, Crístofer was an EMF Águilas de Moratalaz's graduate, after representing a host of teams as a youth, notably RSD Alcalá in 2011. He made his debuts as a senior in the 2012–13 campaign, appearing sparingly in the lower leagues.

In 2013 Crístofer moved to fellow Regional Preferente team EF Periso, In late August 2015, he joined CDC Moscardó in Tercera División, but was initially assigned for the B-side.

== International career ==
Crístofer's mother was the daughter of a Santomean couple. As a result, he was eligible for Spain, Equatorial Guinea and São Tomé and Príncipe national teams.

In June 2015, Crístofer was called up for Equatorial Guinea national team. He made his full international debut on 6 June 2015, coming on as a second-half substitute in a 1–0 friendly win against Andorra.

== Career statistics ==
=== International ===
As of 30 March 2015

Equatorial Guinea
Year	Apps	Goals
2015	1	0
Total	1	0

== Personal life ==
Crístofer is of Bubi descent through his father.
