= Boison Wynney =

Liberian footballer (born 1996)

Personal information
- Full name: Boison Wynney de Souza
- Date of birth: 27 December 1996 (age 29)
- Place of birth: Palma, Spain
- Height: 1.90 m (6 ft 3 in)
- Position: Goalkeeper

Team information
- Current team: Minerul Lupeni

Youth career
- 2011–2012: Recreativo La Victoria
- 2012–2013: Penya Arrabal
- 2013–2014: CD Cide
- 2014–2015: San Francisco

Senior career*
Years	Team	Apps	(Gls)
2015–2016	Mallorca B	0	(0)
2015–2016	→ Olímpic Xàtiva (loan)	0	(0)
2016	Europa	8	(0)
2017	Llosetense	2	(0)
2017–2018	Binissalem	27	(0)
2018–2019	Mallorca B	26	(0)
2019–2020	Doxa Drama	0	(0)
2020–2021	Binissalem	15	(0)
2021–2022	Someșul Dej	13	(0)
2022–2023	Gloria Buzău	0	(0)
2023	→ Progresul Spartac (loan)	2	(0)
2023–2024	Ceahlăul Piatra Neamț	2	(0)
2024–2025	Gloria Ultra	12	(0)
2025–	Minerul Lupeni	11	(0)

International career^{‡}
2017–	Liberia	7	(0)
- * Club domestic league appearances and goals as of 08:42, 4 December 2024 (UTC) ‡ National team caps and goals as of 17 November 2023

Boison Wynney de Souza (born 27 December 1996), known as Boison Wynney or simply Boison, is a professional footballer who plays as a goalkeeper for Liga III club Minerul Lupeni. Born in Spain, he plays for the Liberia national team.

== International career ==
Wynney was born in Palma, Majorca to a Liberian father and a Spanish mother of Afro-Brazilian descent. He was therefore eligible to represent Spain, Liberia, or Brazil. He received his first call for the Liberia national team on 2 November 2016. He made his international debut in the 0–3 away defeat to Zimbabwe for the 2019 Africa Cup of Nations qualifying phase on 11 June 2017.

== Career statistics ==
=== International ===
As of matches played on 17 November 2023

Appearances and goals by national team and year
National team	Year	Apps	Goals
Liberia	2017	1	0
Liberia	2018	1	0
Liberia	2021	1	0
Liberia	2022	1	0
Liberia	2023	3	0
Total		7	0
