= AfroBasket 2021 qualification =

International qualification tournament

Tournament details
- Dates: 14 January 2020 – 8 July 2021
- Teams: 25

Official website
- Qualifiers website Pre-qualifiers website

The AfroBasket 2021 qualification was a basketball competition that was played from January 2020 to July 2021, to determine the fifteen FIBA Africa nations who would join the automatically qualified host Rwanda at the AfroBasket 2021 final tournament.

== Pre-qualifiers ==
The pre-qualifiers were played in January 2020. Five winners from the five zones qualified to the next round.

All times are local.

=== Group A (Sub-zone 1 & 2) ===
| Team 1 | Agg. | Team 2 | 1st leg | 2nd leg |
|---|---|---|---|---|
| Algeria | 169–166 | Cape Verde | 79–67 | 90–99 |

| 15 January 2020 | Algeria | 79–67 | Cape Verde | Staouéli |
| 16:30 | Scoring by quarter: 23–10, 15–20, 24–24, 17–13 |
| | Pts: Ammour 19; Rebs: Ammour 9 Asts: Kaouane 6 | Boxscore | Pts: Coronel 16; Rebs: Almeida 10; Asts: Almeida 3 | Arena: Salle OMS |

| 16 January 2020 | Cape Verde | 99–90 | Algeria | Staouéli, Algeria |
| 16:30 | Scoring by quarter: 17–21, 23–16, 26–29, 33–24 |
| | Pts: Almeida 27; Rebs: Almeida 11; Asts: Almeida 6 | Boxscore | Pts: Ammour 30; Rebs: Ammour 7 Asts: Ammour 7 | Arena: Salle OMS |

Algeria won 169–166 on aggregate.

=== Group B (Sub-zone 3) ===
Ghana, Liberia and Niger would have participated in this tournament in Liberia. The tournament was cancelled.

| Pos | Team | Pld | W | L | PF | PA | PD | Pts | Qualification |
|---|---|---|---|---|---|---|---|---|---|
| 1 | Ghana | 0 | 0 | 0 | 0 | 0 | 0 | 0 | Qualifiers |
| 2 | Liberia (H) | 0 | 0 | 0 | 0 | 0 | 0 | 0 | |
| 3 | Niger | 0 | 0 | 0 | 0 | 0 | 0 | 0 | |

Source: FIBA
Rules for classification: 1) points; 2) head-to-head points; 3) head-to-head points difference; 4) head-to-head number of points scored.
(H) Hosts

=== Group C (Sub-zone 4) ===
| Pos | Team | Pld | W | L | PF | PA | PD | Pts | Qualification |
|---|---|---|---|---|---|---|---|---|---|
| 1 | Equatorial Guinea (H) | 4 | 4 | 0 | 283 | 254 | +29 | 8 | Qualifiers |
| 2 | Chad | 4 | 2 | 2 | 288 | 257 | +31 | 6 | |
| 3 | Gabon | 4 | 0 | 4 | 229 | 289 | −60 | 4 | |

Source: FIBA
Rules for classification: 1) points; 2) head-to-head points; 3) head-to-head points difference; 4) head-to-head number of points scored.
(H) Hosts

| 14 January 2020 | Equatorial Guinea | 59–52 | Gabon | Malabo |
| | | | | Arena: Polideportivo De Malabo |

| 15 January 2020 | Gabon | 61–78 | Chad | Malabo, Equatorial Guinea |
| | | | | Arena: Polideportivo De Malabo |

| 16 January 2020 | Chad | 71–81 | Equatorial Guinea | Malabo, Equatorial Guinea |
| | | | | Arena: Polideportivo De Malabo |

| 17 January 2020 | Chad | 75–49 | Gabon | Malabo, Equatorial Guinea |
| | | | | Arena: Polideportivo De Malabo |

| 18 January 2020 | Gabon | 67–77 | Equatorial Guinea | Malabo, Equatorial Guinea |
| | | | | Arena: Polideportivo De Malabo |

| 19 January 2020 | Equatorial Guinea | 66–64 | Chad | Malabo |
| | | | | Arena: Polideportivo De Malabo |

=== Group D (Sub-zone 5) ===
| Pos | Team | Pld | W | L | PF | PA | PD | Pts | Qualification |
|---|---|---|---|---|---|---|---|---|---|
| 1 | Kenya (H) | 5 | 5 | 0 | 484 | 351 | +133 | 10 | Qualifiers |
| 2 | South Sudan | 5 | 4 | 1 | 506 | 329 | +177 | 9 | |
| 3 | Burundi | 5 | 3 | 2 | 430 | 391 | +39 | 8 | |
| 4 | Somalia | 5 | 2 | 3 | 442 | 480 | −38 | 7 | |
| 5 | Tanzania | 5 | 1 | 4 | 357 | 459 | −102 | 6 | |
| 6 | Eritrea | 5 | 0 | 5 | 317 | 526 | −209 | 5 | |

Source: FIBA
Rules for classification: 1) points; 2) head-to-head points; 3) head-to-head points difference; 4) head-to-head number of points scored.
(H) Hosts

| 14 January 2020 | South Sudan | 112–79 | Somalia | Nairobi, Kenya |
| 16:15 | Scoring by quarter: 25–17, 35–22, 26–22, 26–18 |
| | Pts: Ngor Kuany 21; Rebs: Mayot 12; Asts: Bak 3 | Boxscore | Pts: Mohamed 22; Rebs: Mohamed 9 Asts: Guled 3 | Arena: Nyayo National Stadium |

| 14 January 2020 | Kenya | 112–64 | Eritrea | Nairobi |
| 18:30 | Scoring by quarter: 24–13, 26–12, 29–12, 33–27 |
| | Pts: Mutoro 17; Rebs: Juma 11; Asts: Mutoro 7 | Boxscore | Pts: Irael 23; Rebs: Aron 10; Asts: Samuel 2 | Arena: Nyayo National Stadium |

| 15 January 2020 | Eritrea | 57–111 | South Sudan | Nairobi, Kenya |
| 14:00 | Scoring by quarter: 13–28, 10–35, 20–21, 14–27 |
| | Pts: Aron 23; Rebs: Abiel 7 Asts: Aron, Irael 3 | Boxscore | Pts: Bak 20; Rebs: Mayot 10; Asts: Bak 10 | Arena: Nyayo National Stadium; Attendance: 350 |

| 15 January 2020 | Somalia | 86–106 | Burundi | Nairobi, Kenya |
| 16:15 | Scoring by quarter: 15–20, 16–26, 26–32, 29–28 |
| | Pts: Qaafow 24; Rebs: Olol 11; Asts: Guled 6 | Boxscore | Pts: Hakizimana 27; Rebs: Musoda 11; Asts: Ndikuriyo 4 | Arena: Nyayo National Stadium |

| 15 January 2020 | Tanzania | 59–95 | Kenya | Nairobi, Kenya |
| 18:30 | Scoring by quarter: 0–20, 18–24, 23–28, 18–23 |
| | Pts: Lugora 18; Rebs: Mbegu 18; Asts: Mwenda 4 | Boxscore | Pts: Ligare 23; Rebs: Nyakinda 11; Asts: Bosire, Mutoro 5 | Arena: Nyayo National Stadium; Attendance: 650 |

| 16 January 2020 | Eritrea | 69–101 | Tanzania | Nairobi, Kenya |
| 14:00 | Scoring by quarter: 19–23, 19–28, 13–20, 18–30 |
| | Pts: Andom 14; Rebs: Aron 11; Asts: Samuel 7 | Boxscore | Pts: Mwenda 31; Rebs: Mbegu 14; Asts: Lwoga 8 | Arena: Nyayo National Stadium; Attendance: 120 |

| 16 January 2020 | Burundi | 59–100 | South Sudan | Nairobi, Kenya |
| 16:15 | Scoring by quarter: 15–21, 14–26, 17–22, 13–31 |
| | Pts: Nijimbere 16; Rebs: Ndikuriyo, Nijimbere 6 Asts: Hakizimana, Nijimbere 4 | Boxscore | Pts: Puot 30; Rebs: Mabior 11; Asts: Puot 4 | Arena: Nyayo National Stadium; Attendance: 350 |

| 16 January 2020 | Kenya | 102–77 | Somalia | Nairobi |
| 18:30 | Scoring by quarter: 24–23, 20–23, 31–16, 27–15 |
| | Pts: Mutoro 31; Rebs: Koranga 22; Asts: Bosire, Ligare 4 | Boxscore | Pts: Ali 16; Rebs: Mohamud 9 Asts: Ali 6 | Arena: Nyayo National Stadium; Attendance: 750 |

| 17 January 2020 | Tanzania | 60–115 | South Sudan | Nairobi, Kenya |
| 14:00 | Scoring by quarter: 8–27, 10–27, 16–34, 26–27 |
| | Pts: Mwenda 21; Rebs: Lugora, Mbegu 11; Asts: Lugora 5 | Boxscore | Pts: Bak 29; Rebs: Agau 15; Asts: Lual 8 | Arena: Nyayo National Stadium; Attendance: 150 |

| 17 January 2020 | Somalia | 99–76 | Eritrea | Nairobi, Kenya |
| 16:15 | Scoring by quarter: 30–19, 15–22, 29–8, 25–27 |
| | Pts: Mohamed 19; Rebs: Faruk, Guled 11; Asts: Guled 5 | Boxscore | Pts: Aron 22; Rebs: Andom 11; Asts: Abiel 7 | Arena: Nyayo National Stadium; Attendance: 200 |

| 17 January 2020 | Kenya | 101–83 | Burundi | Nairobi |
| 18:30 | Scoring by quarter: 26–22, 27–18, 28–14, 20–29 |
| | Pts: Ortega 19; Rebs: Owili 12; Asts: Ligare 6 | Boxscore | Pts: Nijimbere 23; Rebs: Ndikuriyo, Nijimbere 6 Asts: Nijimbere 6 | Arena: Nyayo National Stadium; Attendance: 550 |

| 18 January 2020 | Burundi | 79–53 | Tanzania | Nairobi, Kenya |
| 08:00 | Scoring by quarter: 17–13, 28–13, 17–7, 17–20 |
| | Pts: Jimbere 23; Rebs: Bujeje 12; Asts: Ndikuriyo 8 | Boxscore | Pts: Lwoga 12; Rebs: Mbegu 9 Asts: Mwenda 5 | Arena: Nyayo National Stadium; Attendance: 100 |

| 18 January 2020 | Tanzania | 84–101 | Somalia | Nairobi, Kenya |
| 14:00 | Scoring by quarter: 21–27, 18–38, 26–16, 19–20 |
| | Pts: Mwenda 22; Rebs: Mbegu 19; Asts: Mbegu 5 | Boxscore | Pts: Guled 23; Rebs: Mohamed, Shekmohamed 9 Asts: Guled 7 | Arena: Nyayo National Stadium; Attendance: 350 |

| 18 January 2020 | Burundi | 103–51 | Eritrea | Nairobi, Kenya |
| 16:15 | Scoring by quarter: 26–8, 25–7, 29–18, 23–18 |
| | Pts: Ndikuriyo 26; Rebs: Jimbere 10; Asts: Ndikuriyo 6 | Boxscore | Pts: Irael 25; Rebs: Andom 11; Asts: Irael 3 | Arena: Nyayo National Stadium; Attendance: 1,500 |

| 18 January 2020 | South Sudan | 68–74 | Kenya | Nairobi, Kenya |
| 18:30 | Scoring by quarter: 19–25, 11–4, 11–23, 27–22 |
| | Pts: Puondak 16; Rebs: Kuany 11; Asts: Kuany 3 | Boxscore | Pts: Ligare 26; Rebs: Ortega 16; Asts: Ligare 5 | Arena: Nyayo National Stadium; Attendance: 1,800 |

=== Group E (Sub-zone 6 &7) ===
The Comoros and South Africa withdrew before the tournament.

| Pos | Team | Pld | W | L | PF | PA | PD | Pts | Qualification |
|---|---|---|---|---|---|---|---|---|---|
| 1 | Madagascar | 4 | 4 | 0 | 334 | 269 | +65 | 8 | Qualifiers |
| 2 | Zimbabwe (H) | 4 | 1 | 3 | 254 | 275 | −21 | 5 (Note: Zimbabwe 135–132 Zambia) | |
| 3 | Zambia | 4 | 1 | 3 | 282 | 326 | −44 | 5 | |

Source: FIBA
Rules for classification: 1) points; 2) head-to-head points; 3) head-to-head points difference; 4) head-to-head number of points scored.
(H) Hosts
Notes:

| 21 January 2020 | Zimbabwe | 57–74 | Madagascar | Bulawayo |
| 18:00 | Scoring by quarter: 17–6, 7–27, 21–20, 12–21 |
| | Pts: Nyatanga 13; Rebs: Pasipamire 14; Asts: Chitsinde 3 | Boxscore | Pts: Lahontan 23; Rebs: Faralahy 8 Asts: Lahontan 4 | Arena: UFI/UFIC City Sports Centre; Attendance: 350 |

| 22 January 2020 | Madagascar | 98–91(OT) | Zambia | Bulawayo, Zimbabwe |
| 18:00 | Scoring by quarter: 8–19, 23–21, 29–26, 24–18, Overtime: 14–7 |
| | Pts: Faralahy 26; Rebs: Solondrainy 16; Asts: Lahontan 9 | Boxscore | Pts: Simioti 24; Rebs: Njovu 13; Asts: Mauwe 6 | Arena: UFI/UFIC City Sports Centre; Attendance: 200 |

| 23 January 2020 | Zambia | 54–80 | Zimbabwe | Bulawayo, Zimbabwe |
| 18:00 | Scoring by quarter: 20–20, 14–16, 7–19, 13–25 |
| | Pts: Chona 11; Rebs: Kandulu 15; Asts: Lubinda 2 | Boxscore | Pts: Maturure 23; Rebs: Pasipamire 16; Asts: Chitsinde 4 | Arena: UFI/UFIC City Sports Centre; Attendance: 200 |

| 24 January 2020 | Zambia | 59–93 | Madagascar | Bulawayo, Zimbabwe |
| 18:00 | Scoring by quarter: 15–26, 24–16, 13–20, 7–31 |
| | Pts: Njovu 12; Rebs: Njovu 9 Asts: Lubinda, Njovu 4 | Boxscore | Pts: Lahontan 18; Rebs: Randriamampionona 11; Asts: Lahontan 5 | Arena: UFI/UFIC City Sports Centre; Attendance: 200 |

| 25 January 2020 | Madagascar | 69–62 | Zimbabwe | Bulawayo, Zimbabwe |
| 15:00 | Scoring by quarter: 22–13, 11–11, 20–19, 16–19 |
| | Pts: Ratianarivo 12; Rebs: Faralahy 8 Asts: Ralison 3 | Boxscore | Pts: Maturure, Nyatanga 9 Rebs: Maturure 7 Asts: Chitsinde 6 | Arena: UFI/UFIC City Sports Centre |

| 26 January 2020 | Zimbabwe | 55–78 | Zambia | Bulawayo |
| 18:00 | Scoring by quarter: 19–19, 5–20, 11–17, 20–22 |
| | Pts: Maturure, Pasipamire 13; Rebs: Maturure 12; Asts: Chitsinde 4 | Boxscore | Pts: Chona 17; Rebs: Banda 15; Asts: three players 2 | Arena: UFI/UFIC City Sports Centre; Attendance: 600 |

=== Invitational tournament (Inter Sub-zone play-off) ===
Cape Verde, Chad and South Sudan competed in this group, with the winners qualified for the qualifiers.

| Pos | Team | Pld | W | L | PF | PA | PD | Pts | Qualification |
|---|---|---|---|---|---|---|---|---|---|
| 1 | Cape Verde | 2 | 2 | 0 | 181 | 158 | +23 | 4 | Qualifiers |
| 2 | South Sudan | 2 | 1 | 1 | 185 | 160 | +25 | 3 | |
| 3 | Chad | 2 | 0 | 2 | 142 | 190 | −48 | 2 | |

Source: FIBA
Rules for classification: 1) points; 2) head-to-head points; 3) head-to-head points difference; 4) head-to-head number of points scored.

| 22 October 2020 | Chad | 73–90 | Cape Verde | Yaoundé, Cameroon |
| 16:00 | Scoring by quarter: 17–23, 10–21, 16–22, 30–24 |
| | Pts: Nato 24; Rebs: Gninguengar, Nato 6 Asts: Taguina 7 | Boxscore | Pts: Mendonca 25; Rebs: Mendes 11; Asts: Da Rosa 7 | Arena: Yaoundé Multipurpose Sports Complex; Referees: Hassane Kamate (CIV), Kouakou Niamien (CIV), Jean Ruhamiriza (RWA) |

| 23 October 2020 | Cape Verde | 91–85 | South Sudan | Yaoundé, Cameroon |
| 16:00 | Scoring by quarter: 16–22, 32–24, 17–9, 26–30 |
| | Pts: Condé, Correia 24; Rebs: Condé, Correia 11; Asts: Correia, Mendes 4 | Boxscore | Pts: Kuany 19; Rebs: Malou 10; Asts: Bak, Puot 4 | Arena: Yaoundé Multipurpose Sports Complex; Referees: Jules Djopwouo (CMR), Hassane Kamate (CIV), Jean Ruhamiriza (RWA) |

| 24 October 2020 | South Sudan | 100–69 | Chad | Yaoundé, Cameroon |
| 16:00 | Scoring by quarter: 26–20, 22–12, 26–22, 26–15 |
| | Pts: Puot 17; Rebs: Kuany 14; Asts: Kuany 6 | Boxscore | Pts: Nato 16; Rebs: Gninguengar 7 Asts: Taguina 6 | Arena: Yaoundé Multipurpose Sports Complex |

== Qualifiers ==
Due to the COVID-19 pandemic, each group played the November 2020 window at a single venue. The same was done for the February 2021 window.

Qualified teams are the 15 teams qualified for African 2019 World Cup qualifiers second round (except Rwanda already qualified as Host) + 5 teams from Pre-Qualifiers

=== Teams ===
| Entrance/qualification method | Team(s) |
|---|---|
| 2019 World Cup qualifiers first round | Tunisia; Nigeria; Senegal; Morocco; Cameroon; Angola; Egypt; DR Congo; Mali; Rwanda; Central African Republic; Mozambique; Uganda; Ivory Coast; Guinea |
| Pre-Qualifiers Sub-zone 1 & 2 | Algeria withdraw replaced by South Sudan (2nd Sub-zone play-off) |
| Pre-Qualifiers Sub-zone 3 | - |
| Pre-Qualifiers Sub-zone 4 | Equatorial Guinea |
| Pre-Qualifiers Sub-zone 5 | Kenya |
| Pre-Qualifiers Sub-zone 6 & 7 | Madagascar |
| Pre-Qualifiers Sub-zone play-off | Cape Verde |

=== Draw ===
The draw was held on 20 December 2019 in Rwanda. There are 4 seeded pots. Pot 1 contains the TOP 5 at FIBA AfroBasket 2017. Pot 2 & 3 teams ranked at 2019 FIBA Basketball World Cup qualification (Africa), and Pot 4 contains 5 teams from Pre-Qualifiers.

| Pot 1 | Pot 2 | Pot 3 | Pot 4 |
|---|---|---|---|
| Tunisia; Nigeria; Senegal; Morocco; Cameroon | Angola; Ivory Coast; Egypt; Central African Republic; Mali | Rwanda; DR Congo; Mozambique; Uganda; Guinea | South Sudan; Equatorial Guinea; Kenya; Madagascar; Cape Verde |

| Group A | Group B | Group C | Group D | Group E |
|---|---|---|---|---|
| Tunisia; Central African Republic; DR Congo; Madagascar | Senegal; Angola; Mozambique; Kenya | Cameroon; Ivory Coast; Guinea; Equatorial Guinea | Nigeria; Mali; Rwanda; South Sudan | Morocco; Egypt; Uganda; Cape Verde |

=== Group A ===
| Pos | Team | Pld | W | L | PF | PA | PD | Pts | Qualification |
|---|---|---|---|---|---|---|---|---|---|
| 1 | Tunisia | 6 | 6 | 0 | 444 | 342 | +102 | 12 | AfroBasket 2021 |
| 2 | DR Congo | 6 | 3 | 3 | 412 | 382 | +30 | 9 (Note: DR Congo 123–120 Central African Republic) | AfroBasket 2021 |
| 3 | Central African Republic | 6 | 3 | 3 | 415 | 417 | −2 | 9 | AfroBasket 2021 |
| 4 | Madagascar | 6 | 0 | 6 | 382 | 512 | −130 | 6 | |

Source: FIBA
Rules for classification: 1) points; 2) head-to-head points; 3) head-to-head points difference; 4) head-to-head number of points scored.
Notes:

| 27 November 2020 | Tunisia | 89–52 | Madagascar | Kigali, Rwanda |
| 11:00 | Scoring by quarter: 22–16, 20–13, 29–10, 18–13 |
| | Pts: Abbassi, Slimane 12; Rebs: Abbassi 11; Asts: three players 4 | Boxscore | Pts: Mory, Ratianarivo 12; Rebs: Mandimbison 6 Asts: Lahontan 11 | Arena: Kigali Arena; Referees: Kingsley Ojeaburu (NGA), Jean Ruhamiriza (RWA), Arnold Moseya (RSA) |

| 27 November 2020 | Central African Republic | 51–55 | DR Congo | Kigali, Rwanda |
| 14:00 | Scoring by quarter: 15–16, 10–17, 13–20, 13–2 |
| | Pts: Ganapamo 10; Rebs: Kouguere 13; Asts: Zachée 6 | Boxscore | Pts: Kabongo, Munanga 11; Rebs: Sakho 15; Asts: Kabongo, Munanga 5 | Arena: Kigali Arena; Referees: Sameh Estafanous (EGY), Diallo Mahmadou (MLI), Claudio Eiuba (ANG) |

| 28 November 2020 | DR Congo | 50–61 | Tunisia | Kigali, Rwanda |
| 11:00 | Scoring by quarter: 22–19, 4–16, 8–17, 16–9 |
| | Pts: Kayembe-Tshiabu 14; Rebs: Kaniki 8 Asts: Lukusa 4 | Boxscore | Pts: Abada 11; Rebs: Abada, Hadidane 5 Asts: El Mabrouk 4 | Arena: Kigali Arena; Referees: Wael Mostafa (EGY), Walelign Gebeto (ETH), Jean Ruhamiriza (RWA) |

| 28 November 2020 | Madagascar | 79–95 | Central African Republic | Kigali, Rwanda |
| 14:00 | Scoring by quarter: 23–24, 13–29, 20–18, 23–24 |
| | Pts: Mory 24; Rebs: Mory 10; Asts: Randriamampionona 5 | Boxscore | Pts: Ganapamo 22; Rebs: Djimrabaye 10; Asts: Mokongo 10 | Arena: Kigali Arena; Referees: Redouane Darif (MAR), Diallo Mahamadou (MLI), Arnold Moseya (RSA) |

| 29 November 2020 | DR Congo | 82–64 | Madagascar | Kigali, Rwanda |
| 11:00 | Scoring by quarter: 17–15, 19–18, 23–13, 23–18 |
| | Pts: Kayembe 19; Rebs: Sakho 10; Asts: Kabongo 13 | Boxscore | Pts: Randriamampionona 17; Rebs: Mandimbison 13; Asts: Lahontan 5 | Arena: Kigali Arena; Referees: Jean Ruhamiriza (RWA), Diallo Mahamadou (MLI), Claudio Eiuba (ANG) |

| 29 November 2020 | Tunisia | 80–63 | Central African Republic | Kigali, Rwanda |
| 14:00 | Scoring by quarter: 21–13, 19–26, 32–12, 8–12 |
| | Pts: El Mabrouk 15; Rebs: Ben Romdhane, Hadidane 5 Asts: El Mabrouk 5 | Boxscore | Pts: Ganapamo 19; Rebs: Dokossi 11; Asts: Mokongo 6 | Arena: Kigali Arena; Referees: Kingsley Ojeaburu (NGA), Walelign Gebeto (ETH), Forbes Shuva (ZIM) |

| 19 February 2021 | Madagascar | 51–78 | Tunisia | Monastir, Tunisia |
| 17:00 | Scoring by quarter: 13–14, 20–27, 8–17, 10–20 |
| | Pts: Raharimanantoanina 14; Rebs: Botou 5 Asts: four players 2 | Boxscore | Pts: Abada 14; Rebs: Mejri 10; Asts: Chennoufi 4 | Arena: Salle Mohamed Mzali; Referees: Aboulaye Kamagate (CIV), Mbaye Seye (SEN), Samuel Shofoluwe (NGA) |

| 19 February 2021 | DR Congo | 68–69(OT) | Central African Republic | Monastir, Tunisia |
| 20:00 | Scoring by quarter: 15–16, 27–18, 10–13, 12–17, Overtime: 4–5 |
| | Pts: Kayembe 18; Rebs: Kayembe, Sakho 8 Asts: Kamba, Kayembe 2 | Boxscore | Pts: Kouguere 21; Rebs: Jefferson 12; Asts: Zachée 3 | Arena: Salle Mohamed Mzali; Referees: Youssouf Maïga (MLI), Antonio Bernardo (ANG), Diallo Mahamadou (MLI) |

| 20 February 2021 | Tunisia | 73–68 | DR Congo | Monastir |
| 17:00 | Scoring by quarter: 22–17, 21–16, 21–17, 9–18 |
| | Pts: Mejri 14; Rebs: Ben Romdhane 10; Asts: El Mabrouk 6 | Boxscore | Pts: Sakho 12; Rebs: Sakho 7 Asts: Mvouika 4 | Arena: Salle Mohamed Mzali; Referees: Mbaye Seye (SEN), Antonio Bernardo (ANG), Youssouf Maïga (MLI) |

| 20 February 2021 | Central African Republic | 79–72 | Madagascar | Monastir, Tunisia |
| 20:00 | Scoring by quarter: 15–20, 25–11, 14–28, 25–13 |
| | Pts: Dokossi 23; Rebs: Djimrabaye, Dokossi 10; Asts: Nganafio 5 | Boxscore | Pts: Razanamahenina 29; Rebs: Faralahy 6 Asts: three players 2 | Arena: Salle Mohamed Mzali; Referees: Hassane Kamate (CIV), Sofiane Si Youcef (ALG), Haytham Ihaqaf (LBY) |

| 21 February 2021 | Central African Republic | 58–63 | Tunisia | Monastir, Tunisia |
| 17:00 | Scoring by quarter: 21–17, 13–16, 12–14, 12–16 |
| | Pts: Ganapamo 16; Rebs: Dokossi 8 Asts: Djimrabaye, Dokossi 2 | Boxscore | Pts: Ben Romdhane 14; Rebs: Ben Romdhane 16; Asts: El Mabrouk 3 | Arena: Salle Mohamed Mzali; Referees: Antonio Bernardo (ANG), Mbaye Seye (SEN), Diallo Mahamadou (MLI) |

| 21 February 2021 | Madagascar | 64–89 | DR Congo | Monastir, Tunisia |
| 20:00 | Scoring by quarter: 12–27, 17–21, 21–18, 14–23 |
| | Pts: Mory 15; Rebs: Raharimanantoanina 7 Asts: four players 2 | Boxscore | Pts: Kamba 21; Rebs: Sakho 11; Asts: Munanga 5 | Arena: Salle Mohamed Mzali; Referees: Hassane Kamata (CIV), Cherubin Leslie (MRI), Samuel Shofoluwe (NGA) |

=== Group B ===
| Pos | Team | Pld | W | L | PF | PA | PD | Pts | Qualification |
|---|---|---|---|---|---|---|---|---|---|
| 1 | Senegal | 6 | 5 | 1 | 422 | 334 | +88 | 11 | AfroBasket 2021 |
| 2 | Angola | 6 | 4 | 2 | 467 | 383 | +84 | 10 | AfroBasket 2021 |
| 3 | Kenya | 6 | 2 | 4 | 368 | 450 | −82 | 8 | AfroBasket 2021 |
| 4 | Mozambique | 6 | 1 | 5 | 355 | 445 | −90 | 7 | |

Source: FIBA
Rules for classification: 1) points; 2) head-to-head points; 3) head-to-head points difference; 4) head-to-head number of points scored.

| 25 November 2020 | Senegal | 92–54 | Kenya | Kigali, Rwanda |
| 17:00 | Scoring by quarter: 19-19, 28-14, 11–19, 34-2 |
| | Pts: Faye 19; Rebs: Ndoye 10; Asts: Hannah 9 | Boxscore | Pts: Ongwae 13; Rebs: Ongwae 9 Asts: Ongwae 5 | Arena: Kigali Arena; Referees: Tonton Banza (DRC), Samir Abaakil (MAR), Saber Rezgui (TUN) |

| 25 November 2020 | Angola | 87–58 | Mozambique | Kigali, Rwanda |
| 20:00 | Scoring by quarter: 16-13, 24-13, 30-17, 17-15 |
| | Pts: Cipriano 14; Rebs: Gakou, Paulo 6 Asts: Morais 4 | Boxscore | Pts: Canivete Jr. 15; Rebs: Canivete Jr., Ubisse 8 Asts: Novela 6 | Arena: Kigali Arena; Referees: Sameh Estafanous (EGY), Wael Mostafa (EGY), Amr Abooloo (EGY) |

| 26 November 2020 | Kenya | 52–75 | Angola | Kigali, Rwanda |
| 14:00 | Scoring by quarter: 10–18, 15–21, 13–29, 14-7 |
| | Pts: Mutoro, Ongwae 18; Rebs: Gombe 9 Asts: Bosire 5 | Boxscore | Pts: Cipriano 17; Rebs: Gakou 11; Asts: Gonçalves, Gakou 4 | Arena: Kigali Arena; Referees: Sameh Estafanous (EGY), Diallo Mahmadou (MLI), Forbes Shuva (ZIM) |

| 26 November 2020 | Mozambique | 53–60 | Senegal | Kigali, Rwanda |
| 17:00 | Scoring by quarter: 7–16, 13–16, 12–17, 21-11 |
| | Pts: Manuel 20; Rebs: Canivete Jr. 7 Asts: Manuel 4 | Boxscore | Pts: Hannah 13; Rebs: Dime 9 Asts: Hannah 9 | Arena: Kigali Arena; Referees: Redouane Darif (MAR), Kingsley Ojeaburu (NGA), Jean Ruhamiriza (RWA) |

| 27 November 2020 | Mozambique | 62–79 | Kenya | Kigali, Rwanda |
| 17:00 | Scoring by quarter: 19–19, 17–14, 12–23, 14–23 |
| | Pts: Canivete Jr. 22; Rebs: Muchate 8 Asts: Matos 8 | Boxscore | Pts: Ongwae 21; Rebs: Ongwae 16; Asts: Ongwae 7 | Arena: Kigali Arena; Referees: Samir Abaakil (MAR), Redouane Darif (MAR), Saber Rezgui (TUN) |

| 27 November 2020 | Senegal | 66–51 | Angola | Kigali, Rwanda |
| 20:00 | Scoring by quarter: 18–5, 19–14, 11–10, 18–22 |
| | Pts: Hannah 17; Rebs: Ndoye 13; Asts: Ndour 8 | Boxscore | Pts: Pedro 15; Rebs: Pedro 8 Asts: Conceição 3 | Arena: Kigali Arena; Referees: Wael Mostafa (EGY), Amr Abooloo (EGY), Walelign Gebeto (ETH) |

| 19 February 2021 | Kenya | 51–69 | Senegal | Yaoundé, Cameroon |
| 11:00 | Scoring by quarter: 18–21, 13–6, 10–25, 10–17 |
| | Pts: Bungei 11; Rebs: Bungei, Wamukota 6 Asts: Ongwae 3 | Boxscore | Pts: Diallo, Faye 19; Rebs: Ndiaye 8 Asts: Ndour 10 | Arena: Yaoundé Multipurpose Sports Complex; Referees: Tonton Banza (DRC), Saber Rezgui (TUN), Didier Gaga (RWA) |

| 19 February 2021 | Mozambique | 68–91 | Angola | Yaoundé, Cameroon |
| 20:00 | Scoring by quarter: 14–15, 15–26, 19–25, 20–25 |
| | Pts: Novela 17; Rebs: Manjate 7 Asts: Canivete Jr. 4 | Boxscore | Pts: Morais 21; Rebs: Da Silva 6 Asts: Gonçalves 9 | Arena: Yaoundé Multipurpose Sports Complex; Referees: Kingsley Ojeaburu (NGA), Sameh Estafanous (EGY), Jean Ruhamiriza (RWA) |

| 20 February 2021 | Senegal | 84–43 | Mozambique | Yaoundé, Cameroon |
| 14:00 | Scoring by quarter: 18–13, 19–13, 25–7, 22–10 |
| | Pts: Ndoye 24; Rebs: Dime 9 Asts: Ndour 5 | Boxscore | Pts: Manuel 9 Rebs: Novela 8 Asts: Manuel 3 | Arena: Yaoundé Multipurpose Sports Complex; Referees: Samir Abaakil (MAR), Walelign Gebeto (ETH), Kouakou Niamien (CIV) |

| 20 February 2021 | Angola | 73–74 | Kenya | Yaoundé, Cameroon |
| 20:00 | Scoring by quarter: 22–9, 17–19, 17–25, 17–21 |
| | Pts: Jungo 19; Rebs: Jungo 6 Asts: Domingos 5 | Boxscore | Pts: Ongwae 16; Rebs: Wamukota 8 Asts: Ongwae 3 | Arena: Yaoundé Multipurpose Sports Complex; Referees: Redouane Darif (MAR), Sami Belgharek (TUN), Opeyemi Ogunleye (NGA) |

| 21 February 2021 | Kenya | 44–71 | Mozambique | Yaoundé, Cameroon |
| 14:00 | Scoring by quarter: 13–15, 10–21, 9–24, 12–11 |
| | Pts: Awich 11; Rebs: Gombe 9 Asts: three players 3 | Boxscore | Pts: Manuel 15; Rebs: Canivete Jr., Novela 6 Asts: Canivete Jr. 9 | Arena: Yaoundé Multipurpose Sports Complex; Referees: Tonton Banza (DRC), Saber Rezgui (TUN), Jules Djopwouo (CMR) |

| 21 February 2021 | Angola | 82–51 | Senegal | Yaoundé, Cameroon |
| 20:00 | Scoring by quarter: 20–19, 24–11, 14–9, 24–12 |
| | Pts: Bastos 24; Rebs: Gonçalves, Joaquim 8 Asts: three players 4 | Boxscore | Pts: Ndoye 15; Rebs: Faye 8 Asts: Ndour 5 | Arena: Yaoundé Multipurpose Sports Complex; Referees: Kingsley Ojeaburu (NGA), Amr Aboollo (EGY), Kouakou Niamien (CIV) |

=== Group C ===
The first matches were played from 21 to 23 February 2020 in Yaoundé, Cameroon.

| Pos | Team | Pld | W | L | PF | PA | PD | Pts | Qualification |
|---|---|---|---|---|---|---|---|---|---|
| 1 | Ivory Coast | 6 | 6 | 0 | 462 | 368 | +94 | 12 | AfroBasket 2021 |
| 2 | Cameroon | 6 | 4 | 2 | 429 | 330 | +99 | 10 | AfroBasket 2021 |
| 3 | Guinea | 6 | 1 | 5 | 404 | 486 | −82 | 7 (Note: Guinea 155–153 Equatorial Guinea) | AfroBasket 2021 |
| 4 | Equatorial Guinea | 6 | 1 | 5 | 325 | 436 | −111 | 7 | |

Source: FIBA
Rules for classification: 1) points; 2) head-to-head points; 3) head-to-head points difference; 4) head-to-head number of points scored.
Notes:

| 21 February 2020 | Ivory Coast | 58–50 | Guinea | Yaoundé, Cameroon |
| 14:30 | Scoring by quarter: 17–16, 11–8, 19–16, 11–11 |
| | Pts: Thompson 16; Rebs: Hima 10; Asts: three players 3 | Boxscore | Pts: Mansare 17; Rebs: Queta 7 Asts: Queta, Sankhon 2 | Arena: Yaoundé Multipurpose Sports Complex; Referees: Tonton Banza (COD), Kingsley Ojeaburu (NGR), Sofiane Si Youcef (ALG) |

| 21 February 2020 | Cameroon | 90–58 | Equatorial Guinea | Yaoundé |
| 17:00 | Scoring by quarter: 31–16, 27–12, 12–22, 20–8 |
| | Pts: four players 11; Rebs: Nkene 8 Asts: Gbetkom, Kadji 3 | Boxscore | Pts: Obiekwe 15; Rebs: Cabral 7 Asts: Obiekwe 3 | Arena: Yaoundé Multipurpose Sports Complex; Referees: Sameh Estafanous (EGY), Amr Aboollo (EGY), Alioune Fall (SEN) |

| 22 February 2020 | Equatorial Guinea | 64–78 | Ivory Coast | Yaoundé, Cameroon |
| 14:30 | Scoring by quarter: 13–15, 20–15, 14–23, 17–25 |
| | Pts: Cabral, Obiekwe 19; Rebs: Hinestrosa 9 Asts: Mbansogo 7 | Boxscore | Pts: Konaté 18; Rebs: Thompson 12; Asts: Fofana 6 | Arena: Yaoundé Multipurpose Sports Complex; Referees: Kingsley Ojeaburu (NGR), Sameh Estafanous (EGY), Jean Ruhamiriza (RWA) |

| 22 February 2020 | Guinea | 59–90 | Cameroon | Yaoundé, Cameroon |
| 17:00 | Scoring by quarter: 16–20, 13–24, 10–23, 20–23 |
| | Pts: Conde 12; Rebs: Dramé 10; Asts: Queta 2 | Boxscore | Pts: Adala 18; Rebs: Mbala 10; Asts: Pitard 6 | Arena: Yaoundé Multipurpose Sports Complex; Referees: Amr Aboollo (EGY), Sofiane Si Youcef (ALG), Tonton Banza (COD) |

| 23 February 2020 | Guinea | 75–82 | Equatorial Guinea | Yaoundé, Cameroon |
| 14:30 | Scoring by quarter: 22–25, 13–12, 19–24, 21–21 |
| | Pts: Dramé 19; Rebs: Dramé, Queta 12; Asts: three players 4 | Boxscore | Pts: Cabral 24; Rebs: Cabral, Obiekwe 9 Asts: Mbansogo 9 | Arena: Yaoundé Multipurpose Sports Complex; Referees: Kingsley Ojeaburu (NGR), Tonton Banza (COD), Alioune Fall (SEN) |

| 23 February 2020 | Cameroon | 74–82 | Ivory Coast | Yaoundé |
| 17:00 | Scoring by quarter: 19–30, 14–17, 24–19, 17–16 |
| | Pts: Kome, Mbala 13; Rebs: Mbala 14; Asts: Pitard 4 | Boxscore | Pts: Konaté 25; Rebs: Coulibaly, Konaté 7 Asts: Kebe 5 | Arena: Yaoundé Multipurpose Sports Complex; Referees: Sameh Estafanous (EGY), Amr Aboollo (EGY), Sofiane Si Youcef (ALG) |

| 19 February 2021 | Guinea | 73–87 | Ivory Coast | Yaoundé, Cameroon |
| 14:00 | Scoring by quarter: 19–22, 19–25, 25–16, 10–24 |
| | Pts: Doumbia 16; Rebs: three players 6 Asts: Doumbia 4 | Boxscore | Pts: Thompson 14; Rebs: Kouassi 6 Asts: three players 3 | Arena: Yaoundé Multipurpose Sports Complex; Referees: Amr Abooloo (EGY), Sami Belgharek (TUN), Jules Djopwouo (CMR) |

| 20 February 2021 | Ivory Coast | 93–50 | Equatorial Guinea | Yaoundé, Cameroon |
| 11:00 | Scoring by quarter: 27–5, 21–20, 23–17, 22–8 |
| | Pts: Zouzoua 20; Rebs: Coulibaly, Thompson 9 Asts: Kebe, Pamba 6 | Boxscore | Pts: Obiekwe 24; Rebs: Mitogo, Obiekwe 6 Asts: Mbansogo 6 | Arena: Yaoundé Multipurpose Sports Complex; Referees: Tonton Banza (DRC), Sameh Estafanous (EGY), Jean Ruhamiriza (RWA) |

| 20 February 2021 | Cameroon | 98–67 | Guinea | Yaoundé |
| 17:00 | Scoring by quarter: 26–19, 31–15, 19–17, 22–16 |
| | Pts: Nzeulie 22; Rebs: Bayehe 8 Asts: three players 4 | Boxscore | Pts: Sakho 11; Rebs: four players 4 Asts: Conde, Sy 3 | Arena: Yaoundé Multipurpose Sports Complex; Referees: Kingsley Ojeaburu (NGA), Amr Abooloo (EGY), Didier Gaga (RWA) |

| 21 February 2021 | Equatorial Guinea | 71–80 | Guinea | Yaoundé, Cameroon |
| 11:00 | Scoring by quarter: 15–19, 21–19, 13–20, 22–22 |
| | Pts: Cabral 24; Rebs: Cabral 12; Asts: Mbansogo 6 | Boxscore | Pts: Mansaré 18; Rebs: Dramé 14; Asts: Doumbia 11 | Arena: Yaoundé Multipurpose Sports Complex; Referees: Samir Abaakil (MAR), Redouane Darif (MAR), Opeyemi Ogunleye (NGA) |

| 21 February 2021 | Ivory Coast | 64–57 | Cameroon | Yaoundé, Cameroon |
| 17:00 | Scoring by quarter: 5–17, 21–12, 17–18, 21–10 |
| | Pts: Konaté 12; Rebs: Kouassi 8 Asts: Diabate 6 | Boxscore | Pts: Narace 13; Rebs: Frank 10; Asts: Pitard 5 | Arena: Yaoundé Multipurpose Sports Complex; Referees: Sameh Estafanous (EGY), Walelign Gebeto (ETH), Jean Ruhamiriza (RWA) |

| Cancelled (Note: The match originally scheduled for the 19 February 2021 window was postponed, after Equatorial Guinea arrived late, which did not allow sufficient time for testing.) | Equatorial Guinea | 0–20 (Note: After the match could not be played, FIBA decided on 2 March 2021, to forfeit the game in favour of Cameroon.) | Cameroon |

=== Group D ===
| Pos | Team | Pld | W | L | PF | PA | PD | Pts | Qualification |
|---|---|---|---|---|---|---|---|---|---|
| 1 | Nigeria | 6 | 6 | 0 | 465 | 363 | +102 | 12 | AfroBasket 2021 |
| 2 | South Sudan (Note: South Sudan replaced Algeria, as they were unable to participate in the opening matches.) | 6 | 3 | 3 | 397 | 397 | 0 | 9 | AfroBasket 2021 |
| 3 | Mali | 6 | 2 | 4 | 399 | 428 | −29 | 8 | AfroBasket 2021 |
| 4 | Rwanda | 6 | 1 | 5 | 345 | 418 | −73 | 7 | Qualified as host |

Source: FIBA
Rules for classification: 1) points; 2) head-to-head points; 3) head-to-head points difference; 4) head-to-head number of points scored.
Notes:

| 26 November 2020 | Nigeria | 76–56 | South Sudan | Kigali, Rwanda |
| 11:00 | Scoring by quarter: 22–17, 24–12, 15–20, 15–7 |
| | Pts: Agada 16; Rebs: Egekeze 9 Asts: Iroegbu 8 | Boxscore | Pts: Wek 10; Rebs: Acuoth, Malou 8 Asts: Kuany, Makoi 3 | Arena: Kigali Arena; Referees: Walelign Gebeto (ETH), Tonton Banza (DRC), Claudio Eiuba (ANG) |

| 26 November 2020 | Mali | 70–64 | Rwanda | Kigali, Rwanda |
| 20:00 | Scoring by quarter: 21–14, 17–22, 13–17, 19–11 |
| | Pts: Diarra 19; Rebs: Sidibe 11; Asts: Saounera 5 | Boxscore | Pts: Gasana, Ndizeye 17; Rebs: three players 10; Asts: Filer 6 | Arena: Kigali Arena; Referees: Samir Abaakil (MAR), Wael Mostafa (EGY), Arnold Moseya (RSA) |

| 28 November 2020 | South Sudan | 77–64 | Mali | Kigali, Rwanda |
| 17:00 | Scoring by quarter: 27–16, 16–27, 16–11, 18–11 |
| | Pts: Acuoth 11; Rebs: Puondak 7 Asts: Makoi 5 | Boxscore | Pts: Cissé 14; Rebs: Diarra 11; Asts: Saounera 5 | Arena: Kigali Arena; Referees: Kingsley Ojeaburu (NGA), Tonton Banza (DRC), Saber Rezgui (TUN) |

| 28 November 2020 | Rwanda | 62–83 | Nigeria | Kigali |
| 20:00 | Scoring by quarter: 13–22, 15–25, 24–19, 10–17 |
| | Pts: Kabange 13; Rebs: Ndizeye 6 Asts: Filer 6 | Boxscore | Pts: Diogu 18; Rebs: Omoerah 8 Asts: Iroegbu 7 | Arena: Kigali Arena; Referees: Amr Aboollo (EGY), Sameh Estafanous (EGY), Claudio Eiuba (ANG) |

| 29 November 2020 | Nigeria | 91–68 | Mali | Kigali, Rwanda |
| 17:00 | Scoring by quarter: 13–16, 26–15, 22–20, 30–17 |
| | Pts: Iroegbu 17; Rebs: Omogbo, Uzoh 8 Asts: Iroegbu 6 | Boxscore | Pts: Djambo 22; Rebs: Diarra, Sidibe 6 Asts: Kanté 6 | Arena: Kigali Arena; Referees: Tonton Banza (DRC), Wael Mostafa (EGY), Redouane Darif (MAR) |

| 29 November 2020 | Rwanda | 55–67 | South Sudan | Kigali |
| 20:00 | Scoring by quarter: 12–17, 10–16, 19–18, 14–16 |
| | Pts: Shyaka 17; Rebs: Kaje 21; Asts: Gasana 5 | Boxscore | Pts: Puondak 13; Rebs: Wek 8 Asts: Kuany 4 | Arena: Kigali Arena; Referees: Samir Abaakil (MAR), Amr Aboollo (EGY), Sameh Estafanous (EGY) |

| 17 February 2021 | South Sudan | 70–75 | Nigeria | Monastir, Tunisia |
| 17:00 | Scoring by quarter: 9–18, 21–20, 18–19, 22–18 |
| | Pts: Omot 27; Rebs: Wek 8 Asts: Puot 5 | Boxscore | Pts: Iroegbu 16; Rebs: Diogu, Iroegbu 7 Asts: Iroegbu 5 | Arena: Salle Mohamed Mzali; Referees: Tarek Ben Ltaifa (TUN), Babacar Gueye (SEN), Haytham Ihaqaf (LBY) |

| 17 February 2021 | Rwanda | 51–76 | Mali | Monastir, Tunisia |
| 20:00 | Scoring by quarter: 12–17, 11–19, 14–26, 14–14 |
| | Pts: Ibeh 10; Rebs: Kaje 10; Asts: Gasana 5 | Boxscore | Pts: Diarra 12; Rebs: Djambo, Doucouré 5 Asts: Kanté 4 | Arena: Salle Mohamed Mzali; Referees: Antonio Bernardo (ANG), Hassane Kamaté (CIV), Sofiane Si Youcef (ALG) |

| 18 February 2021 | Nigeria | 64–51 | Rwanda | Monastir, Tunisia |
| 14:00 | Scoring by quarter: 14–22, 16–9, 14–10, 20–10 |
| | Pts: Omoerah 13; Rebs: Moneke 8 Asts: Iroegbu 5 | Boxscore | Pts: Mpoyo 14; Rebs: Kaje 7 Asts: Kaje, Nshobozwabyosenumukiza 4 | Arena: Salle Mohamed Mzali; Referees: Hassane Kamaté (CIV), Kamagate Aboulaye (CIV), Babacar Gueye (SEN) |

| 18 February 2021 | Mali | 65–69 | South Sudan | Monastir, Tunisia |
| 17:00 | Scoring by quarter: 23–12, 17–13, 8–22, 17–22 |
| | Pts: Doucouré 14; Rebs: Djambo 8 Asts: Doucouré 4 | Boxscore | Pts: Kuany 21; Rebs: Wek 8 Asts: Kuany 4 | Arena: Salle Mohamed Mzali; Referees: Cherubin Leslie (MRI), Sofiane Si Youcef (ALG), Yann Davidson (MAD) |

| 19 February 2021 | Mali | 56–76 | Nigeria | Monastir, Tunisia |
| 11:00 | Scoring by quarter: 8–24, 17–18, 16–20, 15–14 |
| | Pts: Haidara 11; Rebs: Djambo 10; Asts: Kanouté, Saounera 3 | Boxscore | Pts: Diogu 20; Rebs: Diogu 11; Asts: Iroegbu, Omoerah 3 | Arena: Salle Mohamed Mzali; Referees: Tarek Ben Ltaifa (TUN), Sofiane Si Youcef (ALG), Yann Davidson (MAD) |

| 19 February 2021 | South Sudan | 58–62(OT) | Rwanda | Monastir, Tunisia |
| 14:00 | Scoring by quarter: 19–18, 10–10, 9–15, 15–10, Overtime: 5–9 |
| | Pts: Kuany 13; Rebs: Wek 8 Asts: Kuany | Boxscore | Pts: Nshobozwabyosenumukiza 15; Rebs: Gasana 11; Asts: Kaje 4 | Arena: Salle Mohamed Mzali; Referees: Cherubin Leslie (MRI), Babacar Gueye (SEN), Claudio Eiuba (ANG) |

=== Group E ===
| Pos | Team | Pld | W | L | PF | PA | PD | Pts | Qualification |
|---|---|---|---|---|---|---|---|---|---|
| 1 | Egypt (Q) | 5 | 5 | 0 | 464 | 359 | +105 | 10 | AfroBasket 2021 |
| 2 | Uganda (Q) | 4 | 3 | 1 | 349 | 349 | 0 | 7 | AfroBasket 2021 |
| 3 | Morocco (E) | 6 | 1 | 5 | 435 | 503 | −68 | 7 | |
| 4 | Cape Verde (Q) | 5 | 1 | 4 | 394 | 431 | −37 | 6 | AfroBasket 2021 |

Updated to match(es) played on 8 July 2021. Source: FIBA
Rules for classification: 1) points; 2) head-to-head points; 3) head-to-head points difference; 4) head-to-head number of points scored.
(E) Eliminated; (Q) Qualified for the phase indicated

| 27 November 2020 | Egypt | 96–77 | Uganda | Alexandria |
| 17:30 | Scoring by quarter: 21–24, 31–20, 15–17, 29–16 |
| | Pts: Oraby 16; Rebs: Oraby, Shehata 7 Asts: Mahmoud, Metwaly 4 | Boxscore | Pts: Enabu 20; Rebs: Geu 12; Asts: Drileba, Wainright 6 | Arena: Kamal Shalaby Hall; Referees: Antonio Bernardo (ANG), Youssouf Maïga (MLI), Haytham Ihaqaf (LBY) |

| 27 November 2020 | Morocco | 73–80 | Cape Verde | Alexandria, Egypt |
| 20:30 | Scoring by quarter: 18–22, 19–15, 18–22, 18–21 |
| | Pts: Lahrichi 18; Rebs: Lanani 12; Asts: El Haoua, Lahrichi 4 | Boxscore | Pts: I. Almeida 26; Rebs: I. Almeida 10; Asts: Xavier 7 | Arena: Kamal Shalaby Hall; Referees: Babacar Gueye (SEN), Hassane Kamaté (CIV), Amir Taboubi (TUN) |

| 28 November 2020 | Uganda | 94–90 | Morocco | Alexandria, Egypt |
| 17:30 | Scoring by quarter: 15–15, 25–23, 34–26, 20–26 |
| | Pts: Opong 29; Rebs: Drileba 9 Asts: Enabu 7 | Boxscore | Pts: Choua 25; Rebs: Choua 14; Asts: Gourari 8 | Arena: Kamal Shalaby Hall; Referees: Babacar Gueye (SEN), Haytham Ihaqaf (LBY), Opeyemi Ogunleye (NGA) |

| 28 November 2020 | Cape Verde | 82–91 | Egypt | Alexandria, Egypt |
| 20:30 | Scoring by quarter: 20–21, 18–23, 21–23, 23–24 |
| | Pts: Xavier 25; Rebs: I. Almeida 13; Asts: Xavier 8 | Boxscore | Pts: Gendy 17; Rebs: Gendy, Elmekawi 5 Asts: Saleh 6 | Arena: Kamal Shalaby Hall; Referees: Hassane Kamate (CIV), Youssouf Maïga (MLI), Amir Taboubi (TUN) |

| 29 November 2020 | Uganda | 101–98 | Cape Verde | Alexandria, Egypt |
| 17:30 | Scoring by quarter: 26–25, 26–18, 22–33, 27–22 |
| | Pts: Wainright 36; Rebs: Wainright 13; Asts: Wainright 7 | Boxscore | Pts: J. Almeida, Xavier 24; Rebs: I. Almeida 8 Asts: I. Almeida, Xavier 8 | Arena: Kamal Shalaby Hall; Referees: Hassane Kamate (CIV), Youssouf Maïga (MLI), Haytham Ihaqaf (LBY) |

| 29 November 2020 | Morocco | 76–99 | Egypt | Alexandria, Egypt |
| 20:30 | Scoring by quarter: 22–21, 21–24, 19–36, 14–18 |
| | Pts: Foulani 13; Rebs: Gourari 9 Asts: Gourari 9 | Boxscore | Pts: Farag 17; Rebs: Mahmoud 8 Asts: four players 4 | Arena: Kamal Shalaby Hall; Referees: Antonio Bernardo (ANG), Babacar Gueye (SEN), Opeyemi Ogunleye (NGA) |

| 18 February 2021 | Cape Verde | 69–72 | Morocco | Monastir, Tunisia |
| 11:00 | Scoring by quarter: 23–16, 10–20, 21–8, 15–28 |
| | Pts: Xavier 21; Rebs: Lopes 8 Asts: Monteiro 6 | Boxscore | Pts: Lahrichi 22; Rebs: Lahrichi 7 Asts: Gourari 4 | Arena: Salle Mohamed Mzali; Referees: Tarek Ben Ltaifa (TUN), Youssouf Maïga (MLI), Claudio Eiuba (ANG) |

| 20 February 2021 | Egypt | 94–65 | Cape Verde | Monastir, Tunisia |
| 11:00 | Scoring by quarter: 22–13, 16–16, 16–13, 40–23 |
| | Pts: Aboushousha 16; Rebs: Mahmoud 7 Asts: Mahmou, Mahmoud 4 | Boxscore | Pts: Da Rosa 13; Rebs: Correia, Lopes 5 Asts: Xavier 3 | Arena: Salle Mohamed Mzali; Referees: Cherubin Leslie (MRI), Yann Davidson (MAD), Claudio Eiuba (ANG) |

| 21 February 2021 | Egypt | 84–59 | Morocco | Monastir, Tunisia |
| 11:00 | Scoring by quarter: 28–17, 29–14, 13–13, 14–15 |
| | Pts: Aboushousha 14; Rebs: Mahmoud 9 Asts: Behiry 6 | Boxscore | Pts: three players 11; Rebs: Lahrichi 9 Asts: Choua, Lahrichi 2 | Arena: Salle Mohamed Mzali; Referees: Tarek Ben Ltaifa (TUN), Yann Davidson (MAD), Aboulaye Kamagate (CIV) |

| 8 July 2021 (Note: The matches originally scheduled for the February 2021 window, were postponed after five members of the Uganda delegation tested positive for COVID-19. The games will be played in June/July at a venue to be decided.) | Morocco | 65–77 | Uganda | Salé |
| 19:00 | Scoring by quarter: 10–20, 21–12, 13–23, 21–22 |
| | Pts: three players 13; Rebs: Choua 6 Asts: Khalfi 4 | Boxscore | Pts: Kaluma 20; Rebs: Wainright 12; Asts: Wainright 3 | Arena: Salle Bouazzaoui; Referees: Hassane Kamate (CIV), Tarek Ben Ltaifa (TUN), Kouakou Niamien (CIV) |

| Cancelled | Uganda | vs. | Egypt |

| Cancelled | Cape Verde | vs. | Uganda |

== Qualified teams ==
| Team | Qualification method | Date of qualification | App | Last | Best placement in tournament |
|---|---|---|---|---|---|
| Rwanda | Host nation | 23 June 2019 | 6th | 2017 | Ninth place (2009) |
| Nigeria | Group D top three | 17 February 2021 | 19th | 2017 | Champions (2015) |
| South Sudan | Group D top three | 18 February 2021 | 1st | Debut | |
| Mali | Group D top three | 18 February 2021 | 20th | 2017 | Third place (1972) |
| Senegal | Group B top three | 19 February 2021 | 29th | 2017 | Champions (1968, 1972, 1978, 1980, 1997) |
| Ivory Coast | Group C top three | 19 February 2021 | 24th | 2017 | Champions (1981, 1985) |
| Tunisia | Group A top three | 19 February 2021 | 23rd | 2017 | Champions (2011, 2017) |
| Angola | Group B top three | 19 February 2021 | 21st | 2017 | Champions (1989, 1992, 1993, 1995, 1999, 2001, 2003, 2005, 2007, 2009, 2013) |
| Egypt | Group E top three | 20 February 2021 | 24th | 2017 | Champions (1962, 1964, 1970, 1975, 1983) |
| Cameroon | Group C top three | 20 February 2021 | 10th | 2017 | Runners-up (2007) |
| Central African Republic | Group A top three | 20 February 2021 | 20th | 2017 | Champions (1974, 1987) |
| DR Congo | Group A top three | 20 February 2021 | 7th | 2017 | Fourth place (1975) |
| Kenya | Group B top three | 20 February 2021 | 4th | 1993 | Fourth place (1993) |
| Guinea | Group C top three | 2 March 2021 | 6th | 2017 | Fourth place (1962) |
| Cape Verde | Group E top three | 8 July 2021 | 7th | 2015 | Third place (2007) |
| Uganda | Group E top three | 8 July 2021 | 3rd | 2017 | 13th place (2017) |
