= Ruphin =

Ruphin is a masculine given name. Notable people with the name include:

- Ruphin Kayembe-Tshiabu (born 1992), Congolese-Belgian basketball small forward
- Ruphin Menakely (born 1975), Malagasy football forward
- Ruphin Zafisambo, former prime minister of Madagascar
