= Kingseley Obiekwe =

Equatoguinean basketball player

Kingsley Obiekwe
No. 11 – Herons Basket
- Positions: Small forward; Shooting guard
- League: Serie C Gold Basket

Personal information
- Born: 25 March 1994 (age 32) Madrid, Spain
- Listed height: 1.98 m (6 ft 6 in)
- Listed weight: 91 kg (201 lb)

Career information
- College: Northeastern Oklahoma A&M (2015–2017)
- NBA draft: 2018: undrafted

Career history
- –2012: Torrejón Basketball Academy
- 2012–2013: Canarias Basketball Academy
- 2014–2015: Alcázar Basket
- 2017–2019: Fundación Lucentum Baloncesto
- 2019–present: SSD Giuseppe Angel

Kingsley Obiekwe Sam (born 25 March 1994) is a professional basketball player who plays as a small forward or shooting guard for Italian club Herons Basket. Born in Spain, he plays for the Equatorial Guinea national team.

== Early life ==
Obiekwe was born in Madrid to a Nigerian father and an Equatorial Guinean mother. As a young player, he developed at Torrejón Basketball Academy in the outskirts of the Spanish capital, and had success for their Junior teams.

== Professional career ==
Obiekwe has played in the United States for the Northeastern Oklahoma A&M Golden Norsemen. Later, he played back in Spain for Fundación Lucentum Baloncesto.

== International career ==
Obiekwe has joined the Equatorial Guinea men's national basketball team in January 2020.
