= Bruno Ondo Mengue =

Equatoguinean basketball player

No. 17 – Costone Siena
- Position: Shooting guard / small forward
- League: Serie C Silver

Personal information
- Born: 14 April 1992 (age 34) Madrid, Spain
- Listed height: 1.93 m (6 ft 4 in)
- Listed weight: 96 kg (212 lb)

Career information
- Playing career: 2008–present

Career history
- 2008–2012: Stella Azzurra
- 2012–2013: AcegasAps Trieste
- 2013–2014: Prima Veroli
- 2014–2015: Mens Sana
- 2015–2016: Nuova Aquila Palermo
- 2017: Lighthouse Trapani
- 2017–2018: Fiorentina Basket
- 2018: Don Bosco Livorno
- 2019: Janus Fabriano
- 2019–present: Felice Scandone

Bruno Esono Ondo Mengue (born 14 April 1992) is an Equatoguinean professional basketball player who plays as a shooting guard and small forward for Costone Siena and the Equatorial Guinea national team. He also holds Italian citizenship.

== Early life ==
Ondo Mengue was born in Madrid, Spain, to Equatoguinean Fang parents. He lived in Equatorial Guinea from 2 to 5 years old. Then he moved back to Madrid, where he spent a year, and after that he settled in Pisa, Italy.

== Professional career ==
Ondo Mengue has developed his entire club career in Italy.

In 2019, Ondo Mengue signed with Scandone Avellino in Italy's Serie B Basket.

== International career ==
Ondo Mengue joined the Equatorial Guinea national basketball team in January 2020. He has previously represented Italy at under–16, under–18 and under–20 levels.
