= Walter Cabral =

Equatoguinean basketball player

Craiova
- Position: Power forward
- League: Liga Națională

Personal information
- Born: 25 September 1995 (age 31) Madrid, Spain
- Listed height: 2.01 m (6 ft 7 in)
- Listed weight: 86 kg (190 lb)

Career history
- 2014–2015: Baloncesto Fuenlabrada
- 2015–2017: Eurocolegio Casvi
- 2017–2018: Real Canoe
- 2018–2020: CB Zamora
- 2020–2021: CD Estela
- 2021–2022: Fundación Lucentum
- 2022–2023: CD Estela
- 2023–2024: Södertälje BBK
- 2024–present: Craiova

Walter Junior Cabral Bueriberi (born 25 September 1995) is a professional basketball player who plays as a power forward for Liga Națională club Craiova. Born in Spain, he plays for the Equatorial Guinea national team.

== Early life ==
Walter Junior was born in Madrid to a Bissau-Guinean father and an Equatorial Guinean Bubi mother.

== Club career ==
Walter Junior has developed his entire club career in Spain.

== International career ==
Walter Junior has joined the Equatorial Guinea men's national basketball team in January 2020.
