= Stéphane Dumas (basketball) =

French basketball player and coach

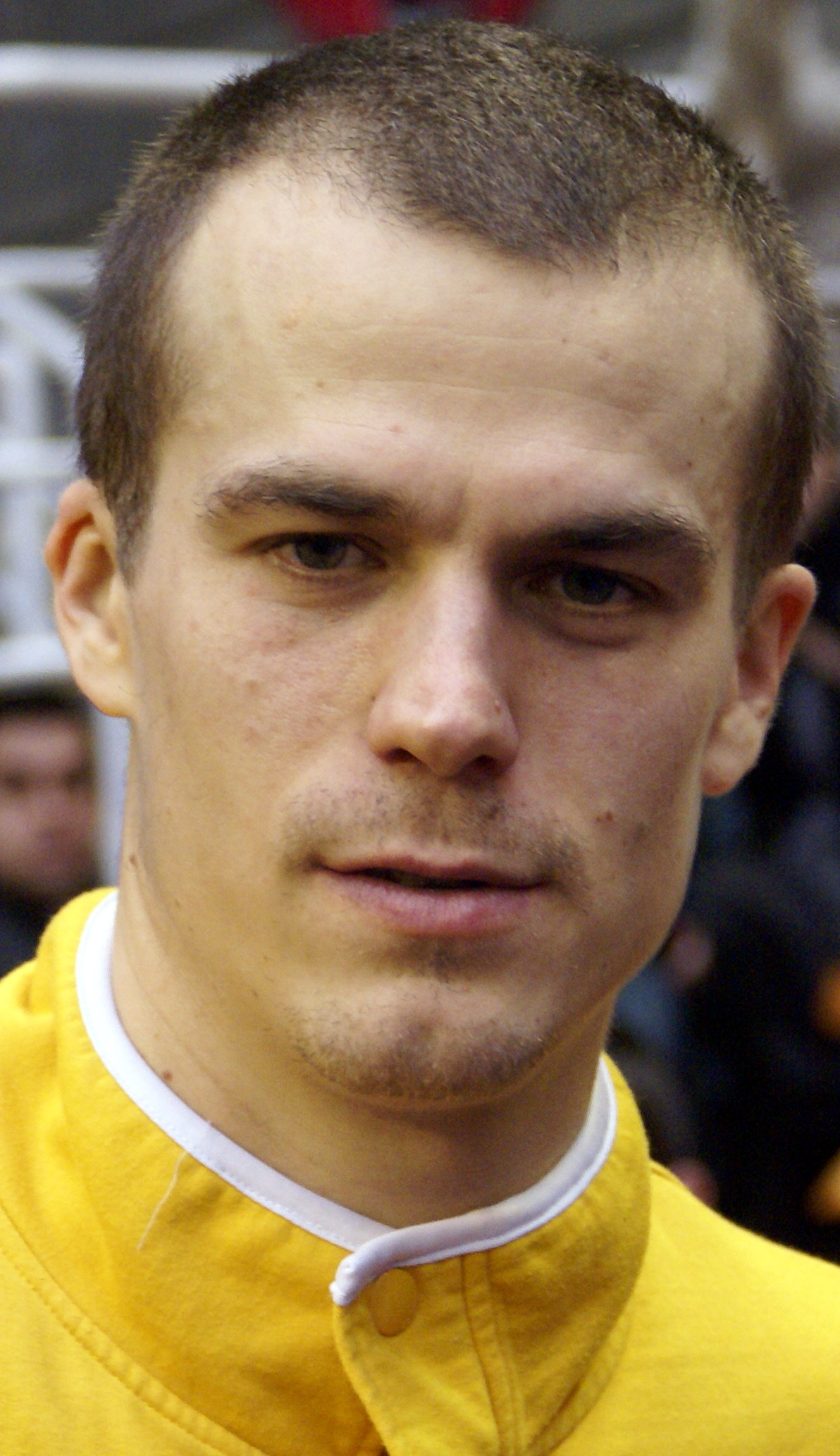

Personal information
- Born: September 14, 1978 (age 48) Sanary-sur-Mer, France
- Listed height: 1.89 m (6 ft 2 in)

Career information
- Playing career: 1995–present
- Position: Assistant coach

Career history

Playing
- 1995–96: Hyères-Toulon
- 1996–2000: CSP Limoges
- 2000–02: Joventut Badalona
- 2002: CB Valladolid
- 2002–03: CE Lleida Bàsquet
- 2003–04: Joventut Badalona
- 2004–05: CB Girona
- 2005–06: Air Avellino
- 2006–07: Baloncesto León
- 2007–08: CB Lucentum Alicante
- 2008–12: CB Valladolid
- 2012–2013: JL Bourg-en-Bresse

Coaching
- 2019–present: Equatorial Guinea
- 2020–2022: Gran Canaria (assistant)
- 2022–2023: FUS Rabat

Stéphane Louis André Dumas (born 14 September 1978) is a French basketball coach and former player who played as a point guard. From 2020 to 2022, he was the assistant basketball coach for Gran Canaria of the Liga ACB, alongside Spaniard Alejandro Paniagua, the current coach of the Equatorial Guinea national team.

== Professional playing career ==
After winning three competitions with CSP Limoges, Dumas arrives to Spain and signs with Joventut Badalona, where he plays two years. team who was runner-up of the Copa del Rey. After playing in Badalona he plays between 2002 and 2003 in Fórum Valladolid and Caprabo Lleida.

The next year comes back to Joventut Badalona, where he is runner-up of the Copa del Rey.

In 2006, he signs with Baloncesto León of LEB League, Spanish second division, and he plays two years. In the first one, León losses in the semifinals of the promotion playoffs and in the second, wins the Copa Príncipe and promotes to Liga ACB as runner-up.

In 2008, Dumas signs with CB Lucentum Alicante and finishes runner-up of Copa Príncipe. In the LEB Oro League, Lucentum losses in the semifinals of promotion playoffs against Tenerife Rural.

For the 2008–09, Stéphane Dumas comes back to CB Valladolid and he clinches the title of the LEB Oro League, promoting to Liga ACB. In the next season he renews his contract with castilian team.

Two years later, and after playing a Copa del Rey, Dumas renews again his contract.

In summer 2012, Dumas leaves Valladolid and comes back to France.

== Coaching career ==
In summer 2019 he became the head coach of Equatorial Guinea.

On July 22, 2020, he became assistant coach for Gran Canaria of the Liga ACB.

Dumas took over as head coach of FUS Rabat in the 2022-23 season.

== Achievements ==
- Ligue Nationale de Basketball: (1) 1999–2000
- Coupe de France: (1) 1999–2000
- Korać Cup: (1) 1999-2000
- Copa Príncipe: (1) 2007
- LEB Oro: (1) 2008–09
