= Óscar Ngomo =

Equatoguinean basketball player

No. 0 – CB Salou
- Position: Power forward
- League: Liga EBA

Personal information
- Born: 28 July 1990 (age 36) Madrid, Spain
- Listed height: 2.01 m (6 ft 7 in)
- Listed weight: 110 kg (243 lb)

Career history
- 2007–2009: CB Valls
- 2009–2010: CB Tarragona
- 2010–2011: CB Vila-Seca
- 2011–2012: CB Tarragona B
- 2012–2014: Malabo Kings
- 2014–2015: CB Tarragona
- 2015–2019: CB Valls
- 2019–2020: CB Morell
- 2020–2023: CB Salou
- 2023–2027: CB Valls

Óscar Ngomo Mifumu (born 28 July 1990) is an Equatoguinean professional basketball player who plays as a power forward for CB Salou and the Equatorial Guinea national team. He also holds Spanish citizenship.

== Early life ==
Ngomo was born in Madrid, Spain, but he is originally from Acam Yebinveiñ, Equatorial Guinea. He settled permanently in Tarragona when he was 9.

== Club career ==
Ngomo has developed almost his entire club career in Catalonia, but he has also been part of the Malabo Kings squad in Equatorial Guinea.

== International career ==
Born in Spain, Ngomo held Equatoguinean nationality since his birth and acquired Spanish nationality once he was an adult. He joined the Equatorial Guinea men's national basketball team in January 2020.
