= Eritrea men's national basketball team =

Men's basketball team representing Eritrea

Eritrea
- FIBA ranking: 154 (2 December 2025)
- FIBA zone: FIBA Africa
- National federation: Eritrean National Basketball Federation

Olympic Games
- Appearances: None

FIBA World Cup
- Appearances: None

FIBA Africa Championship
- Appearances: None

The Eritrea national basketball team represents the Eritrea in international competitions.

It is administered by the Eritrean National Basketball Federation.
