= Willy Kouassi =

Ivorian basketball player (born 1991)

EO La Goulette et du Cran
- Position: Center
- League: CNA

Personal information
- Born: 29 December 1991 (age 34) Abidjan, Ivory Coast
- Listed height: 2.09 m (6 ft 10 in)
- Listed weight: 104 kg (229 lb)

Career information
- High school: Central Park Christian Academy (Birmingham, Alabama)
- College: Auburn (2011–2012); Kennesaw State (2013–2015); Arkansas (2015–2016)
- NBA draft: 2016: undrafted

Career history
- 2020–2021: Dalia Sportive de Grombalia
- 2022–2023: US Ansar
- 2023–present: EO La Goulette et du Kram

Jacques Willy Kouassi (born 29 December 1991) is an Ivorian professional basketball player for Dalia Sportive de Grombalia and the Ivorian national team.

Kouassi began his professional career in 2020 with DS Grombalia where he stayed for two seasons, before joining US Ansar and later EO La Goulette et du Kram.

He represented the Ivory Coast at the FIBA AfroBasket 2021, where the team won the silver medal.
