= Nianta Diarra =

Malian basketball player (born 1993)

Free Agent
- Position: Center

Personal information
- Born: April 18, 1993 (age 33) Bamako, Mali
- Listed height: 6 ft 7 in (2.01 m)
- Listed weight: 218 lb (99 kg)

Career information
- NBA draft: 2015: undrafted
- Playing career: 2012–present

Career history
- 2012–2013: STB Le Havre
- 2013–2014: Hyères-Toulon
- 2014: STB Le Havre
- 2014–2016: BC Souffelweyersheim
- 2016–2018: Antibes Sharks
- 2018–2019: Boulazac
- 2019–2022: Cholet

Nianta Diarra (born April 18, 1993) is a Malian professional basketball player who last played for Cholet Basket of the LNB Pro A. He is a member of the Malian national basketball team.

He played the 2017–18 season with Olympique Antibes, averaging 5.8 points and 4.8 rebounds per game. In July 2018 he signed with Boulazac.

On October 3, 2019, he has signed with Cholet Basket of the LNB Pro A.
