= Sebas Mbansogo =

Equatoguinean basketball player

No. 32 – Real Canoe NC
- Position: Point guard
- League: LEB Plata

Personal information
- Born: 31 March 1995 (age 31) Getafe, Spain
- Listed height: 1.88 m (6 ft 2 in)
- Listed weight: 87 kg (192 lb)

Career history
- 2013–2015: Baloncesto Fuenlabrada
- 2015–2017: Alcázar Basket
- 2017–present: Baloncesto Alcobendas

Sebastián Bacale Mbansogo Obiang (born 31 March 1995), known as Sebas Mbansogo, is a professional basketball player who plays as a point guard for LEB Plata club Real Canoe NC. Born in Spain, he plays for the Equatorial Guinea national team.

== Early life ==
Mbansogo was born in Getafe to Equatorial Guinean Fang parents.

== Club career ==
Mbansogo has developed his entire club career in Spain.

== International career ==
Mbansogo has joined the Equatorial Guinea men's national basketball team in January 2020.
