= Kendal Manuel =

American basketball player

Free agent
- Position: Shooting guard

Personal information
- Born: September 13, 1997 (age 29) Billings, Montana, U.S.
- Listed height: 6 ft 4 in (1.93 m)
- Listed weight: 190 lb (86 kg)

Career information
- High school: Skyview (Billings, Montana)
- College: Oregon State (2016–2018); Montana (2018–2020)
- NBA draft: 2020: undrafted
- Playing career: 2021–present

Career history
- 2021: Força Lleida
- 2021–2022: Union Tarbes-Lourdes Pyrénées Basket

Career highlights
- Second-team All-Big Sky (2020); Big Sky Newcomer of the Year (2019)

Kendal Allen Manuel (born September 13, 1997) is an American-Mozambican professional basketball player who last played for Union Tarbes-Lourdes Pyrénées Basket of the Nationale Masculine 1. He played college basketball for the Oregon State Beavers and Montana Grizzlies.

== Early life and high school career ==
Manuel was born in Billings, Montana but moved to Mozambique in his youth. His family later lived in Maine, Florida and New Orleans before moving back to Montana. He attended Skyview High School in Billings. Manuel averaged 21.8 points, 6.1 rebounds, 2.0 assists and 1.8 steals per game as a junior. Manuel helped Skyview win its first-ever Class AA state basketball championship in 2015. After considering attending prep school, he signed with Oregon State in June 2015. Manuel had known coach Wayne Tinkle for years as he was friends with Tinkle's son, fellow Oregon State signee Tres Tinkle.

== College career ==
Manuel missed his true freshman season at Oregon State with a broken right leg. As a redshirt freshman, he started 25 games and averaged 7.8 points, 2.4 rebounds and 1.6 assists per game, shooting 38.5 percent from behind the arc. During his sophomore season Manuel saw his minutes decline and averaged 2.6 points, 1.2 rebounds and 0.3 assists per game. The Beavers finished 5-27, and he decided to transfer. Manuel decided to come home to play for the Montana Grizzlies, and he was granted immediate eligibility hours before his first game. Manuel averaged 8.7 points per game as a junior and was named Big Sky Newcomer of the Year. He struggled with his shooting in the nonconference part of his senior season, making 25.3 percent of his three-point attempts and shot 35.3 percent from the field. On January 4, 2020, he scored a career-high 30 points and grabbed six rebounds in a 74-66 loss to Northern Colorado. As a senior, Manuel averaged 15.1 points, 3.5 rebounds and 1.9 assists per game. He earned Second Team All-Big Sky honors.

== Professional career ==
On August 18, 2020, Manuel signed his first professional contract with Oviedo of the Spanish LEB Oro. However, he left the team on September 25. On January 26, 2021, Manuel signed with Força Lleida. He averaged 5.3 points and 1.0 assist per game. On June 25, 2021, Manuel signed with Union Tarbes-Lourdes Pyrénées Basket of the Nationale Masculine 1.

== National team career ==
Manuel has represented Mozambique in international competitions. During the FIBA Africa Windows of qualification for the Mundobasket 2019, he averaged 21.7 points, four rebounds, 1.7 assists and 1.3 steals per game.

== Personal life ==
Manuel's father Paulo Manuel is a native of Mozambique and a nephew of Nelson Mandela.
