= Ruphin Kayembe-Tshiabu =

Congolese-Belgian basketball player

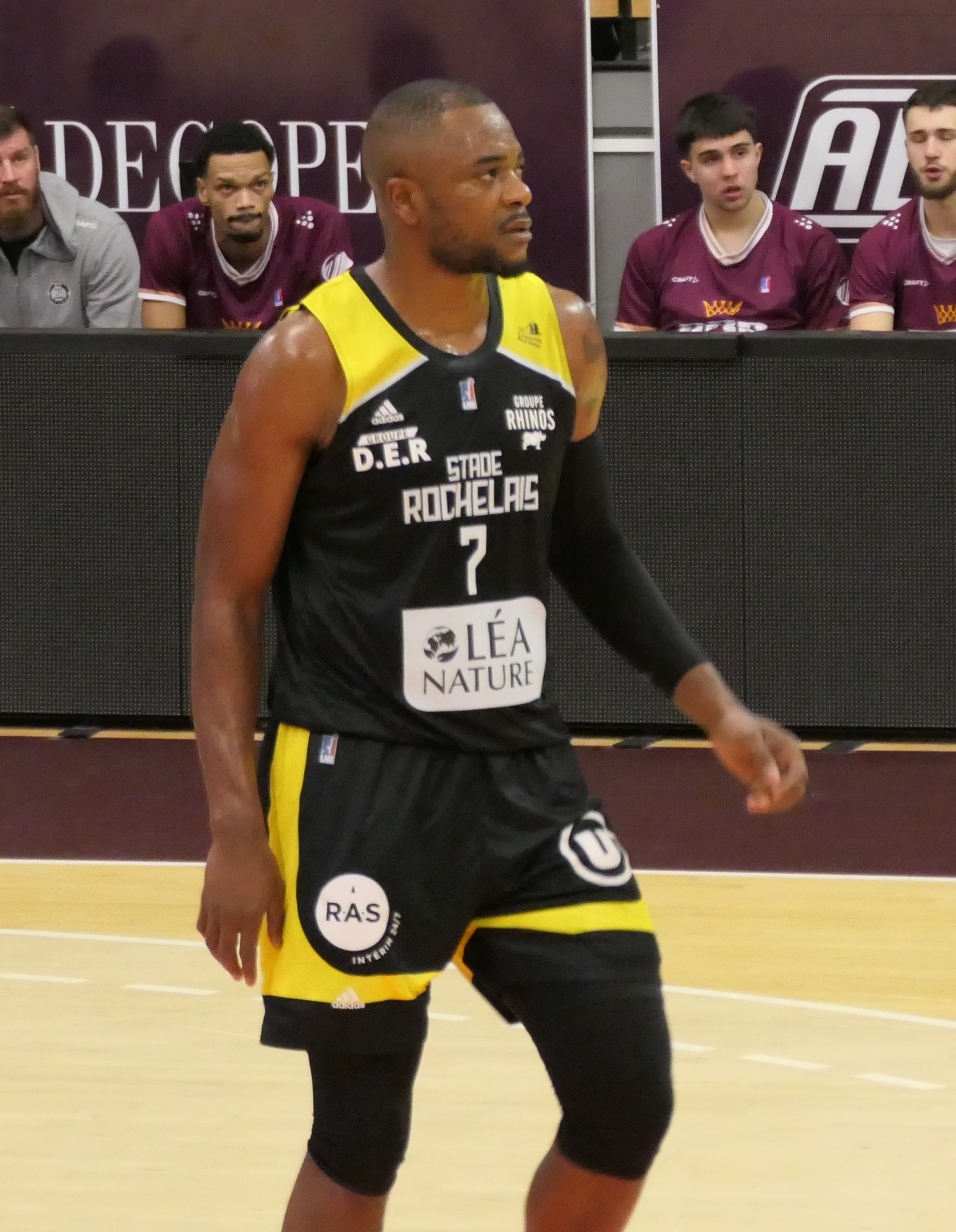
- Kayembe-Tshiabu in January 2023

Free Agent
- Position: Small forward

Personal information
- Born: December 9, 1992 (age 33) Kinshasa, Zaire
- Listed height: 6 ft 7 in (2.01 m)
- Listed weight: 200 lb (91 kg)

Career information
- NBA draft: 2014: undrafted
- Playing career: 2012–present

Career history
- 2012–2015: KK Maribor
- 2015–2016: Vendée Challans Basket
- 2016–2017: BC Souffelweyersheim
- 2017–2020: ALM Évreux Basket
- 2020–2021: Champagne Châlons-Reims
- 2021–2023: Stade Rochelais

Ruphin Kayembe-Tshiabu (born December 9, 1992) is a Congolese-Belgian professional basketball player.

== Professional career ==
In 2012, Kayembe-Tshiabu started his professional career in Slovenia with KK Maribor.

During the 2021–22 season, he played for Champagne Châlons-Reims of the LNB Pro A.

== DR Congo national team ==
Kayembe-Tshiabu played for the DR Congo national team on several occasions. He played 3 games at the 2019 FIBA World Cup qualification where he averaged 8.7 points and 5.3 rebounds per game.
