= Equatorial Guinea men's national basketball team =

Equatorial Guinea
- FIBA ranking: ▲ (3 March 2026)
- Joined FIBA: 1994
- FIBA zone: FIBA Africa
- National federation: Feguibasket
- Coach: Stéphane Dumas and Alejandro Paniagua

Olympic Games
- Appearances: None

FIBA World Cup
- Appearances: None

FIBA Africa Championship
- Appearances: None
Home	Away

The Equatorial Guinea national basketball team is the national basketball team from Equatorial Guinea. It has yet to appear at the FIBA World Championship or the FIBA Africa Championship.

The team was originally set to take part in the AfroBasket 2017 qualification.

At the AfroBasket 2021 qualification, the team started out strong as it won its first four games. Yet, at the end the Equatoguineans did not qualify due to narrowly losing the direct comparison against Guinea by two points.

== Competitive record ==
=== AfroBasket ===
Equatorial Guinea has never qualified for an AfroBasket tournament, although it was close in the 2021 qualification.

AfroBasket record						Qualification record		
Year	Round	Position	GP	W	L	GP	W	L
(Algeria) 1995	Did not qualify							
(Senegal) 1997	Did not qualify							
(Angola) 1999	Did not qualify							
(Morocco) 2001	Did not qualify							
(Egypt) 2003	Did not qualify							
(Algeria) 2005	Did not qualify							
(Angola) 2007	Did not qualify							
(Libya) 2009	Did not qualify					Did not enter		
(Madagascar) 2011	Did not qualify					Did not enter		
(Ivory Coast) 2013	Did not qualify					Did not enter		
(Tunisia) 2015	Did not qualify					Withdrew		
(Senegal) (Tunisia) 2017	Did not qualify					Did not enter		
(Rwanda) 2021	Did not qualify					10	5	5
(Angola) 2025	Did not qualify					2	1	1
Total	0/13		0	0	0	12	6	6

== Team ==
=== Current roster ===
At the AfroBasket 2025 qualification:

Equatorial Guinea men's national basketball team – AfroBasket 2025 qualification roster
Players
Coaches

Pos.	No.	Name	Age – Date of birth	Height	Club	Ctr.
SG	4	Roberto Raúl Ondo	33 – 7 November 1992		Malabo Kings	(Equatorial Guinea)
PF	5	Salvador Koka	36 – 13 March 1990		Nueva Era	(Equatorial Guinea)
C	6	José Antonio Nve	–	1.98 m (6 ft 6 in)	CB Conejero	(Spain)
PG	7	Juan Coffi	27 – 7 August 1998	1.93 m (6 ft 4 in)	CB Clavijo	(Spain)
PF	8	Guillermo Mayende	–	1.98 m (6 ft 6 in)	CB Santa Perpètua	(Spain)
PG	9	Sebas Mbansogo	31 – 31 March 1995	1.88 m (6 ft 2 in)	Real Canoe	(Spain)
SG	10	Juan Bautista Aboho	–	1.94 m (6 ft 4 in)	The Panthers	(Equatorial Guinea)
SF	11	Kingsley Obiekwe	32 – 25 March 1994	1.98 m (6 ft 6 in)	ASD Loreto Basket	(Italy)
C	13	Juan Manuel Esono	–		UE Mataró U21	(Spain)
SF	14	Bruno Ondo Mengue	34 – 14 April 1992	1.93 m (6 ft 4 in)	Costone Siena	(Italy)
PF	15	Ruslán Hinestrosa	32 – 8 May 1993		San Antonio de Palé	(Equatorial Guinea)
PF	17	Óscar Ngomo	35 – 28 July 1990	2.01 m (6 ft 7 in)	CB Valls	(Spain)
SG	18	Silvestre Coffi	29 – 9 February 1997	1.95 m (6 ft 5 in)	UE Mataró	(Spain)
PG	19	Jorge Luis Esono	25 – 15 May 2000		Nueva Era	(Equatorial Guinea)
PG	20	Gilberto Obama	23 – 30 September 2002		Nueva Era	(Equatorial Guinea)
SF		Josué Alberto Ebendeng	–		Litoral Basket	(Equatorial Guinea)
SF		Pablo Ndong Enzema	–		Living Sport Academy	(Equatorial Guinea)
C		Luis Javier Nve	–		Litoral King	(Equatorial Guinea)

Head coach

- (Spain) Alejandro Paniagua

Roster

== See also ==
- Equatorial Guinea men's national under-16 basketball team
